= Saleh al-Luhaydan =

Saudi scholar (1932–2022)

Sheikh Saleh al-Luhaydan
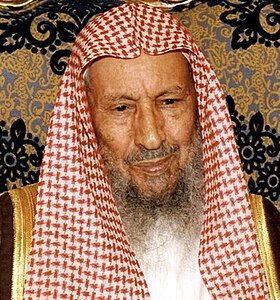

Personal life
- Born: Saleh bin Muhammad al-Luhaydan; 1932 Al Bukayriyah, Al-Qassim Province, Saudi Arabia
- Died: 5 January 2022 (aged 90)
- Education: College of Sharia, Riyadh (1959), Higher Institute of the Judiciary (1969)
- Occupation: Scholar, judge, imam, preacher

Religious life
- Religion: Islam
- Denomination: Sunni
- Jurisprudence: Hanbali
- Creed: Athari
- Movement: Salafism

Sheikh Saleh bin Muhammad al-Luhaydan (Arabic: صالح بن محمد اللحيدان; 1932 – 5 January 2022) was a Saudi scholar, judge, imam, preacher, and member of the Council of Senior Scholars. He was also a teacher of Sharia sciences.

== Biography ==
Al-Luhaydan was born in 1932 in Al Bukayriyah in the Al-Qassim Province, Hejaz and Nejd.

He graduated from the College of Sharia in Riyadh in 1959 and obtained a master's thesis from the Higher Institute of the Judiciary in 1969.

From 1992 on, he was considered the most influential person in the Supreme Judicial Council and his name was associated with the Saudi judiciary. He held the position of President of the Supreme Judicial Council until 2009. He also worked as a secretary and judicial lieutenant to Muhammad ibn Ibrahim Al al-Sheikh, the former Saudi Grand Mufti in Ifta' after his graduation until he was appointed in 1963 as an assistant to the president of the Grand Court in Riyadh, and then became president of the court in 1964. He continued as president of the Great Court until he was appointed in 1970 as a judge of cassation and a member of the Supreme Judicial Council.

In 1982, he was appointed Chairman of the Permanent Committee of the Supreme Judicial Council and continued to do so as vice-president of the Council in his absence until he was appointed in 1992 as Chairman of the Council in the General and Permanent Council. He was also a member of the Council of Senior Scholars since its establishment in 1971 AD and a member of the Muslim World League, and was active in the Islamic Al-Raya magazine; as its director and editor-in-chief, and he gave lessons in the Grand Mosque which were broadcast, and fatwas on the Noor on the Path program. He also lectured, gave seminars and participated in the discussion of master's and doctoral theses. He was removed from the presidency of the judiciary in 1430 AH.

Al-Luhaydan died on 5 January 2022, at the age of 90.
