= Ibn Humayd =

Ibn Humayd may refer to:

- Abd Allah ibn Humayd (1911–1982), Saudi Islamic scholar
- Salih ibn Humayd (born 1949), Grand Mufti of Saudi Arabia
- Ibn Humayd al-Najdi, Muslim scholar and Hanbali Mufti of Mecca
