= Al ash-Sheikh =

Islamic clerical family in Saudi Arabia

- Parent family: Banu Tamim
- Country: Saudi Arabia
- Current region: Gulf states
- Etymology: Family of the Sheikh
- Origin: Najd, Arabia
- Founder: Muhammad ibn Abd al-Wahhab
- Members: Abdullah bin Muhammad Al Sheikh; Suleiman bin Abdullah Al Sheikh; Abdullah ibn Abdullatif Al ash-Sheikh; Muhammad ibn Ibrahim Al ash-Sheikh; Abdulaziz ibn Abdullah Al ash-Sheikh
- Connected families: House of Saud
- Distinctions: Saudi Arabia's leading religious family (ulama)
- Traditions: Sunni Islam (Hanbalism)

The Al ash-Sheikh (Arabic: آل الشيخ, ʾĀl aš-Šaykh), (Note: Using the term the Al ash-Sheikh family is a pleonasm as the word Al already means family. See #Etymology. It would, in theory, be correct to use the term Family of the Sheikh, but, unlike House of Saud, in practice this is rarely done.) also transliterated in a number of other ways, including Al ash-Shaykh, Al ash-Shaikh, Al al-Shaykh or Al-Shaykh (Note: Also, Al al-Sheikh, Al al-Shaikh, Al-Sheikh, Al-Shaikh, Al-Ashaykh, Al-Ashaikh, or Al-Asheikh, and the first word Al in any of these transliterations can be renderred as Aal.) is Saudi Arabia's leading religious family. They are the descendants of Muhammad ibn Abd al-Wahhab al-Tamimi al-Najdi. In Saudi Arabia, the Al ash-Sheikh family is second in prestige only to the Al Saud royal family. The two families formed a power-sharing arrangement nearly 300 years ago. This agreement, which remains in place today, involves the Al Saud maintaining the Al ash-Sheikh's religious authority and the Al ash-Sheikh supporting the Al Saud's political authority.

Although the Al ash-Sheikh family's dominance of the religious establishment has weakened in recent decades, its members still occupy most of the key religious positions in Saudi Arabia and are closely linked to the Al Saud family through extensive intermarriage. Due to the religious and moral authority of the Al ash-Sheikh, the agreement between the two families is crucial for maintaining the legitimacy of the Saudi royal family's rule over the country.

== Etymology ==
The Arabic name Al ash-Sheikh (آل الشيخ) (which is transliterated in a number of ways) translates into English as family of the Sheikh or House of the Sheikh. The word Al, in conjunction with the name of an ancestor, means family of or House of. The term ash-Sheikh refers to the Islamic religious reformer Muhammad ibn Abd al-Wahhab, the family's ancestor. He was known as the Sheikh, a term of respect for a noted elder, teacher or religious leader.

== Origins and history ==
=== Muhammad ibn Abd al-Wahhab ===
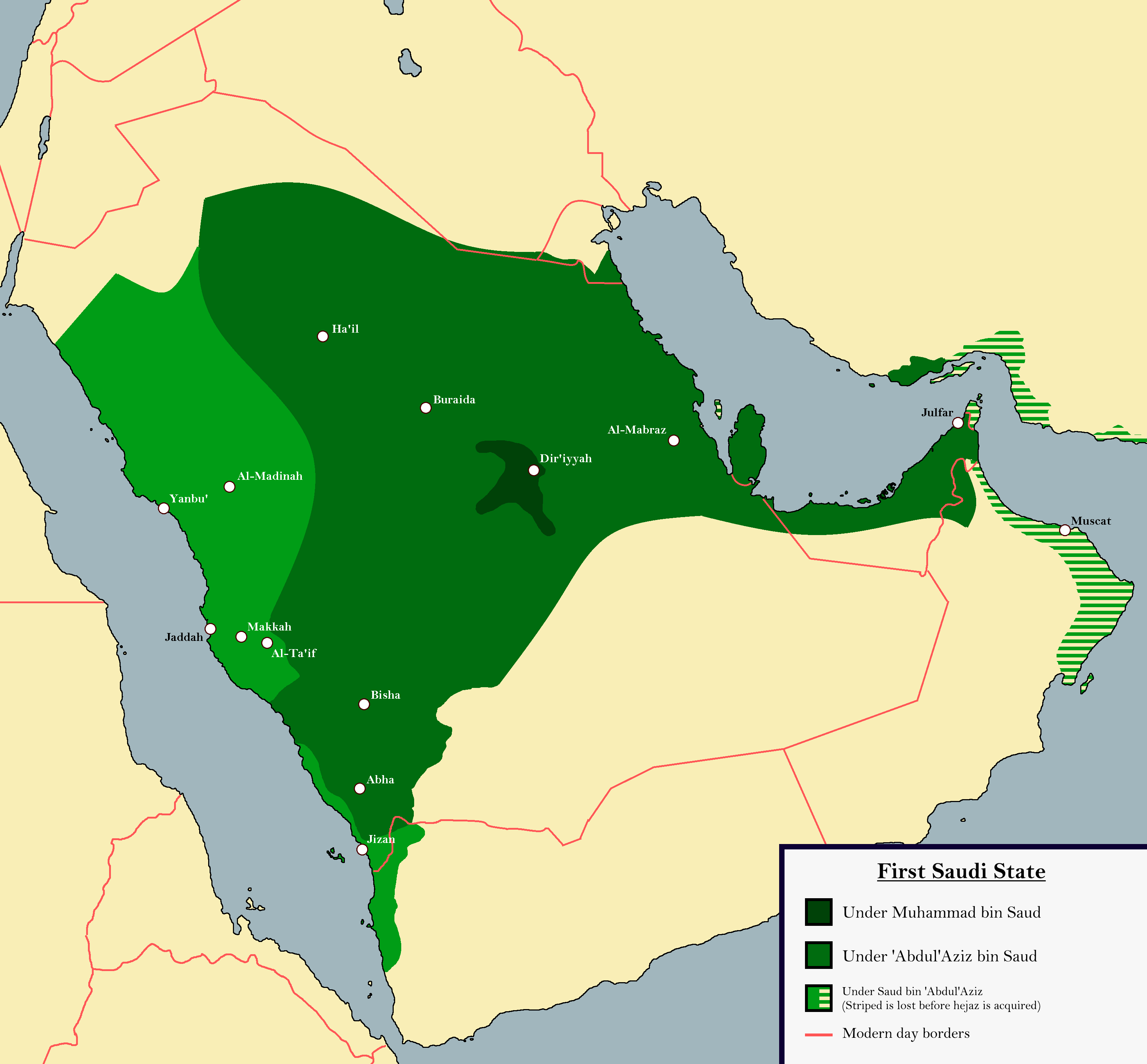
The First Saudi State: the product of the alliance between the Al Saud and Muhammad ibn Abd al-Wahhab

The Al ash-Sheikh are the descendants of Muhammad ibn Abd al-Wahhab, the 18th century founder of the Wahhabi sect which is today dominant in Saudi Arabia. Ibn Abd al-Wahhab was born in 1703 in the Nejd. He became influenced by the teachings of Ibn Taymiya, a medieval jurist of the Hanbali school of jurisprudence. As a consequence, he began to preach a simple, puritanical form of Islam that warned against what he believed were religious innovations and critical of the moral laxity he claimed to see in his contemporaries. He attracted support, and his followers became known as Muwahhidun (translated in English as unitarians) because of his emphasis on the oneness of God. Outside Arabia they became known as Wahhabis.

In the 1740s, he moved to Diriyah in Nejd, where Muhammad ibn Saud, founder of the Al Saud dynasty, was the local ruler. Muhammad ibn Saud decided to support Ibn Abd al-Wahhab's cause, and the combination of the religious zeal inspired by Ibn Abd al-Wahhab's teachings and the Al Saud's military and political leadership initiated a period of conquest and expansion. Most of central Arabia and the Hejaz was brought under the Al Saud's rule in what became known as the "First Saudi State". The religious establishment, led by Ibn Abd al-Wahhab and his family, benefitted from the expansion in an unprecedented manner, enjoying prestige and influence and sharing the treasury with the Al Saud. After his death in 1791, Ibn Abd al-Wahhab's legacy was carried on by his many descendants, who continued to hold positions of religious authority.

=== Pact with the Al Saud ===
Muhammad ibn Saud and Muhammad ibn Abd al-Wahhab had concluded a formal agreement in 1744: according to one source, Muhammad ibn Saud had declared when they first met,

"This oasis is yours, do not fear your enemies. By the name of God, if all Nejd was summoned to throw you out, we will never agree to expel you." Muhammad ibn Abd al-Wahhab replied, "You are the settlement's chief and wise man. I want you to grant me an oath that you will struggle with me against the unbelievers. In return you will be imam, leader of the Muslim community and I will be leader in religious matters."

Ibn Saud accordingly gave his oath. The descendants of Muhammad ibn Saud, the Al Saud, continued to be the political leaders of the Saudi state in central Arabia through the 19th and into the 20th centuries, and eventually created the modern Kingdom of Saudi Arabia in 1932. The descendants of Ibn Abd al-Wahhab, on the other hand, have historically led the ulema, the body of Islamic religious leaders and scholars, and dominated the Saudi state's clerical institutions.

The agreement between Ibn Abd al-Wahhab and Muhammad ibn Saud of 1744 became a "mutual support pact" and power-sharing arrangement between the Al Saud and the Al ash-Sheikh, which has remained in place for nearly 300 years. The pact between the two families, which continues to this day, is based on the Al Saud maintaining the Al ash-Sheikh's authority in religious matters and upholding and propagating the Wahhabi doctrine. In return, the Al ash-Sheikh support the Al Saud's political authority thereby using its religious-moral authority to legitimize the royal family's rule. In fact, each legitimizes the other. This alliance formed in the 18th century provided the ideological impetus to Saudi expansion and remains the basis of Saudi Arabian dynastic rule today.

=== The 19th and early 20th centuries ===
Following Ibn Abd al-Wahhab's death, his son, Abdullah bin Muhammad Al Sheikh, became leader of the Saudi religious establishment. He endorsed further Al Saud expansion and wrote a number of tracts against Shia belief.

By the early 19th century, the Saudi conquests had attracted the hostile attentions of the Ottoman Empire. Ottoman forces from Egypt were sent to Arabia in 1811 and, by 1818, had destroyed the Al Saud's state. The defeat of the Al Saud was also a disaster for the Al ash-Sheikh. The Ottomans executed many of the family in 1818 including Sulayman ibn Abd Allah, a grandson of Ibn Abd al-Wahhab and an influential author of treatises. A whole branch of the family was exiled to Egypt and never returned. This had a major impact on the Saudi religious establishment and left it with no important sources of religious authority for most of the nineteenth century.

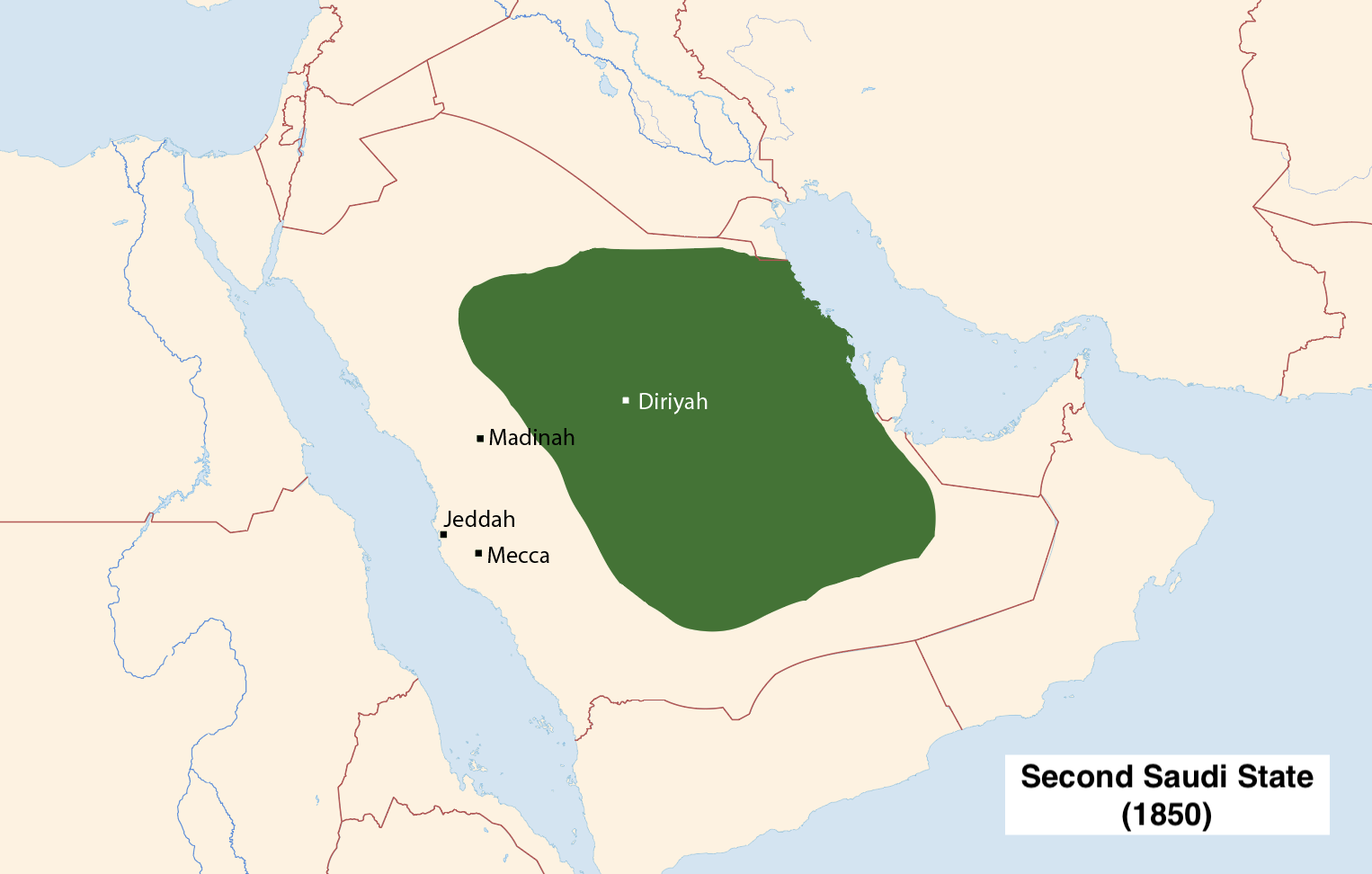
Second Saudi State (1824–1891) at its greatest extent

Nevertheless, the family survived in Nejd. When the Al Saud re-established themselves with a much smaller so-called "Second Saudi State" from 1824, Abd al-Rahman ibn Hasan and, subsequently, Abd al-Latif ibn Abd al-Rahman, both descendants of Ibn Abd al-Wahhab, became the leaders of the Saudi religious establishment. However, the destruction of the first Saudi state and the exile or execution of most of the Al ash-Sheikh religious scholars of significance in 1818 meant that the religious establishment lost much of its prestige, influence and material wealth: their eminence in the 18th century was in sharp contrast with their decline in the 19th century.

For much of the rest of the century, the Al Saud struggled for control of central Arabia with their rivals, the Al Rashid of Ha'il. Eventually, they were defeated in 1891; the Saudi state was again destroyed and the Al Saud went into exile. The ulema was led, at the time, by another descendant of Ibn Abd al-Wahhab, Abd Allah bin Abd al-Latif. Rather than going into exile after the defeat, he decided to side with the Al-Rashid and moved to Ha'il, indicating that preservation of the Wahhabi cause took precedence over the family compact with the Al Saud. But the Al Saud returned from exile in 1902 under the leadership of Abdul Aziz Al Saud (later Saudi Arabia's first King) and re-established the Saudi state around Riyadh. Abd Allah bin Abd al-Latif then changed sides again and re-joined the Al Saud, a change of heart which was accepted by Abdul Aziz.

On the eve of Abdul Aziz's return from exile, the religious establishment had limited authority and influence after the decline in its fortunes of the 19th century. However, he recognized that he could use them to legitimize and help consolidate any conquests he made. He therefore cemented the relationship with the Al ash-Sheikh by preferential treatment and matrimonial links, for example, by marrying the daughter of Abd Allah bin Abd al-Latif. With the support of the Al ash-Sheikh and the other Wahhabi ulema, Abdul Aziz went on to conquer the rest of the territory that was to become Saudi Arabia and declared the formation of the new kingdom in 1932. Even after his conquests were complete, Abdul Aziz continued to favor the ulema and especially the Al ash-Sheikh. Their support remained essential for the legitimization of his regime and the process of integration of the conquered territories through religion, education and law. The Al ash-Sheikh were given prestige, privileges, influence and key positions in the government.

On the other hand, the alliance between Al ash-Sheikh and the House of Saud or more specifically Abdul Aziz was not free from tensions. Some of the Nejdi ulema, particularly those who were under the protection of other Wahhabi rulers, supported Abdul Aziz's enemies. However, in the end, most of the Nejdi ulema agreed to recognize his authority on condition that, at least temporarily, his father Abd al-Rahman would carry the title of imam. The difficulties arose in relations between Abdul Aziz and the Wahhabi ulema after the establishment of the Kingdom because Abdul Aziz was not considered by them sufficiently religious. Furthermore, Abdul Aziz had not taken up jihad to expand Wahhabi influence. He also maintained relations with the British authorities in the Persian Gulf region.

== Role in modern Saudi Arabia ==
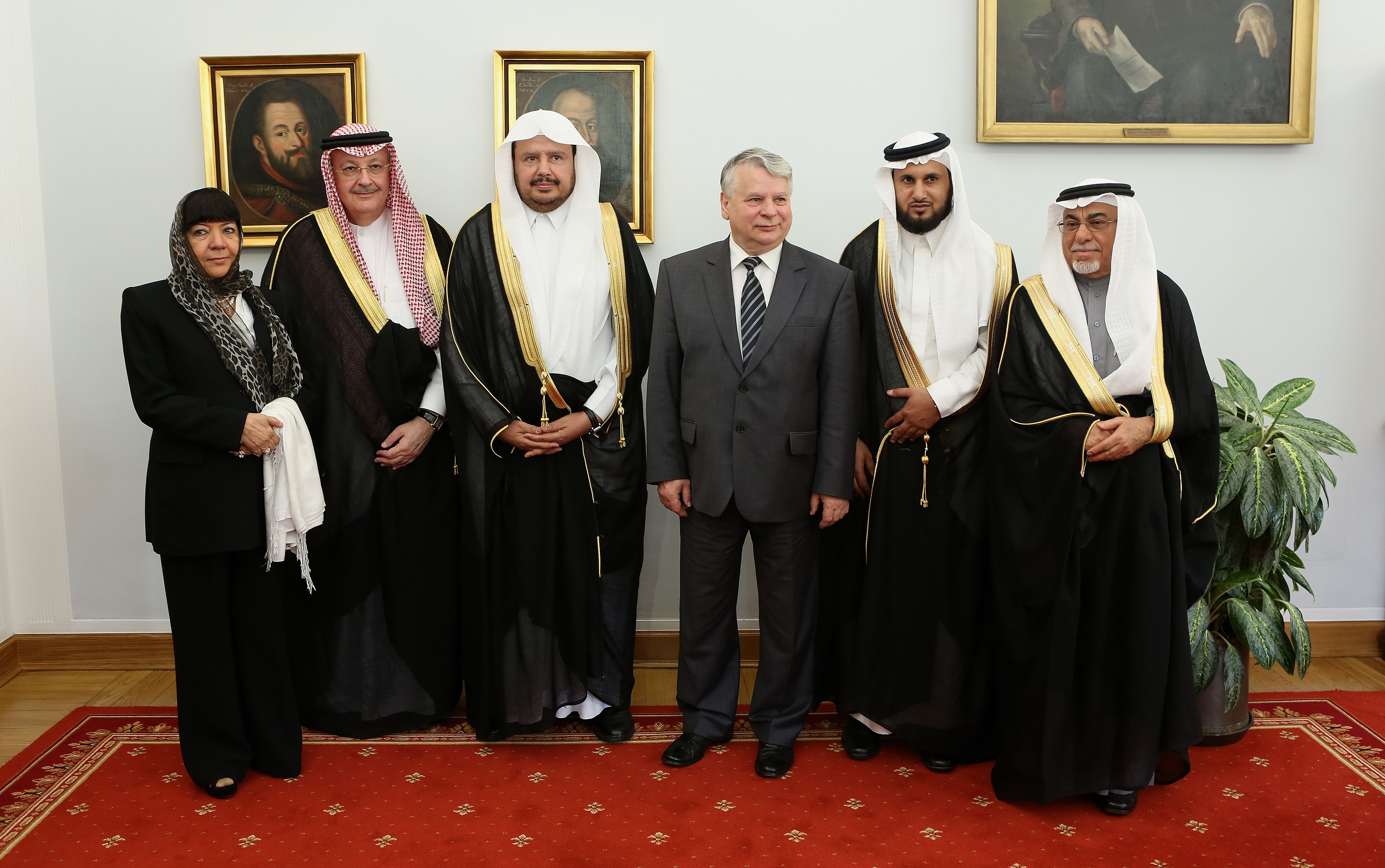
Chairman of the Majlis ash-Shura (Consultative Assembly) Abdullah ibn Muhammad Al ash-Sheikh in the Polish Senate, 26 May 2014.

The Al ash-Sheikh's position as leader of the ulema is significant because of the central role of religion in Saudi society. It has been said that Islam is more than a religion, it is a way of life in Saudi Arabia, and, as a result, the influence of the ulema is all-pervasive. Specifically, Saudi Arabia is almost unique in giving the ulema a direct involvement in government, the only other example being Iran. Not only is the succession to the throne subject to the approval of the ulema, but so are all new laws (royal decrees). The ulema have also been a key influence in major government decisions, have a significant role in the judicial and education systems and a monopoly of authority in the sphere of religious and social morals.

Believed to number several hundred individuals currently, the Al ash-Sheikh has continued to produce religious leaders who have exercised great influence on government decision-making. The Al ash-Sheikh ulema have dominated key state institutions such as the Senior Council of Ulema and the Higher Council of Qadis (Judges). Traditionally the most senior religious office, the Grand Mufti, was filled by a member of the family. Other members of the family serve in important military and civilian capacities, as well as serving as judges and other religious figures.

However, the Al ash-Sheikh's domination of the ulema has diminished somewhat in recent decades. This is in part because an increase in the number of students in the seminaries has led to an influx from other families, and the Al ash-Sheikh have not produced offspring in sufficient numbers to maintain a numerical predominance. Furthermore, in 1969, King Faisal abolished the office of Grand Mufti (it was restored in 1993 by a successor) and replaced it with a ministry of justice. The first minister appointed was deliberately not an Al ash-Sheikh, although subsequent ministers have been. Members of the family have held other ministerial positions but the family's representation in the cabinet dropped from three to two members in 2003 (the Minister of Justice and Minister of Islamic Affairs) and, as of 2020, stands at three ministers, Saleh bin Abdul-Aziz Al ash-Sheikh, Minister of Islamic Affairs, Abdullatif bin Abdulmalik bin Omar Al-ash Sheikh, Minister of Municipal and Rural Affairs and Turki Al-Sheikh Minister of Entertainment .

Nevertheless, the Al ash-Sheikh are still Saudi Arabia's leading religious family and second in prestige only to the royal family. The family continues to hold many of the most important religious posts in Saudi Arabia: for example, the former Grand Mufti (the position having been restored in 1993) is a member of the family, Abdul-Aziz ibn Abdullah Al ash-Sheikh, who served until his death in 2025.

The family's position is derived not only from their role in the ulema but also from being closely linked to the Al Saud by a high degree of intermarriage. This began in the eighteenth century and has continued in modern times: King Faisal's mother was Tarfa bint Abdullah, daughter of Abd Allah ibn Abd al-Latif Al ash-Sheikh. The family alliance with the Al ash-Sheikh is still crucial to the Al Saud in maintaining their legitimacy. At the same time, the Al ash-Sheikh remain strong supporters of the continued rule of the Al Saud.

== Notable members ==
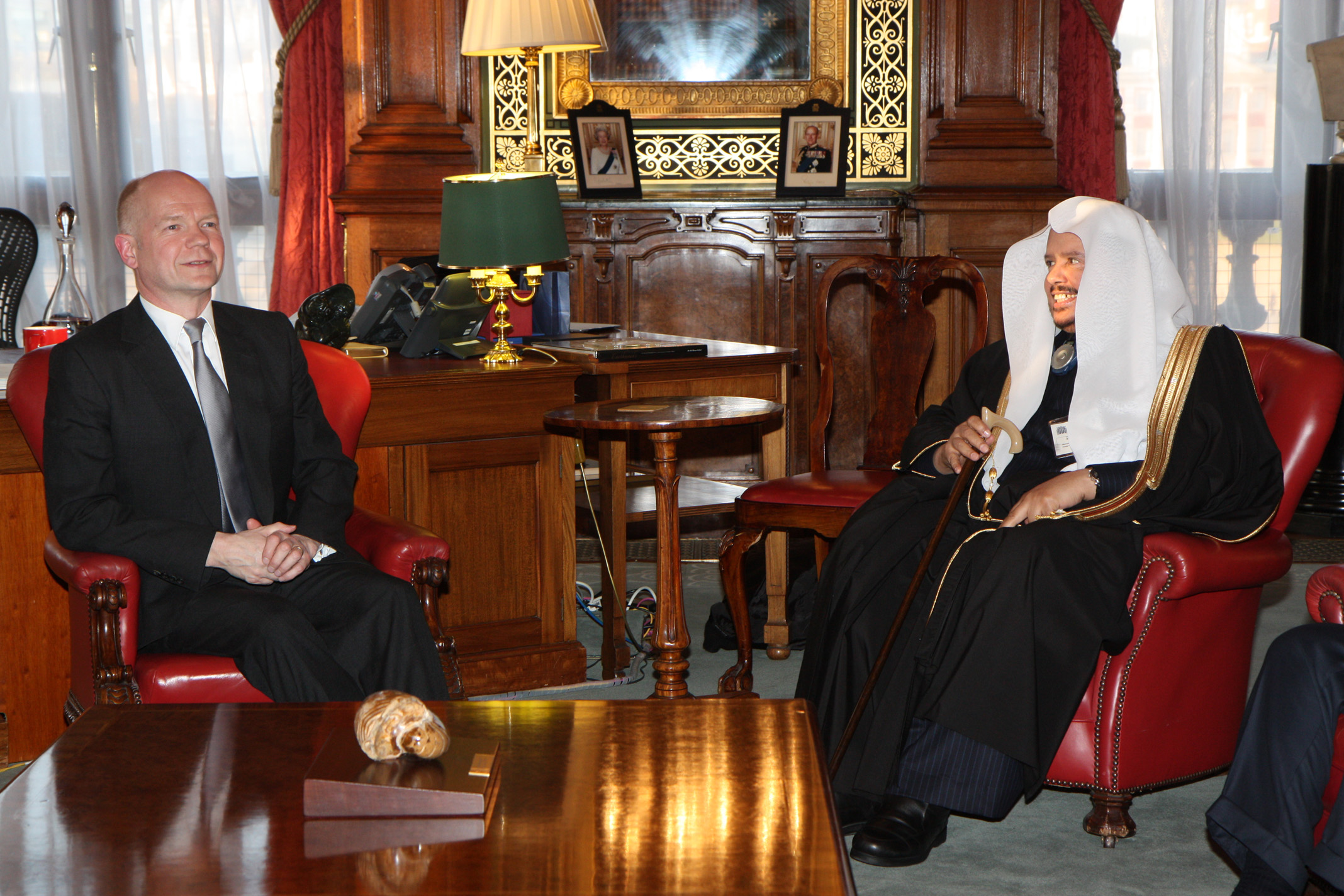
Abdullah ibn Muhammad Al al-Sheikh with British foreign secretary William Hague in London, 5 March 2013.

- Muhammad ibn Abd al-Wahhab (1703–1792), founder of the house.
- Abd Allah ibn Muhammad Abd al-Wahhab (1751–1829), son of Muhammad ibn Abd al-Wahhab.
- Suleiman bin Abdullah Al Sheikh (1785–1818), influential author of treatises.
- Abdul Rahman bin Hasan Al al-Sheikh (1780–1869), Head of Saudi religious establishment in the Second Saudi State.
- Abd al-Latif ibn Abd al-Rahman Al al-Sheikh (1810–1876), Head of Saudi religious establishment in 1860s and early 1870s.
- Abd Allah ibn Abd al-Latif Al ash-Sheikh (1848–1921), Head of Saudi religious establishment during the early years of Ibn Saud.
- Tarfa bint Abdullah Al Sheikh, mother of King Faisal of Saudi Arabia.
- Muhammad ibn Ibrahim Al ash-Sheikh (1893–1969), Grand Mufti of Saudi Arabia from (1953-1969).
- Ibrahim ibn Muhammad Al ash-Sheikh, Saudi Minister of Justice (1975–1990).
- Abdulaziz Al al-Sheikh (1943-2025), Grand Mufti of Saudi Arabia (1999–2025).
- Abdullah ibn Muhammad Al ash-Sheikh, Saudi Minister of Justice (1993–2009).
- Saleh Al al-Sheikh, former Saudi Minister of Islamic Affairs since 1999 to 2014 and 2015 to 2018.
- Abdullatif bin Abdulaziz Al-Sheikh, current Saudi Minister of Islamic Affairs since June 2018.
- Hussein bin Abdulaziz bin Hassan Al ash-Sheikh, Imam of the Prophet's Mosque since 1997.

== See also ==
- History of Saudi Arabia
