= Mohammad bin Abdulkarim Al-Issa =

Saudi Arabian politician

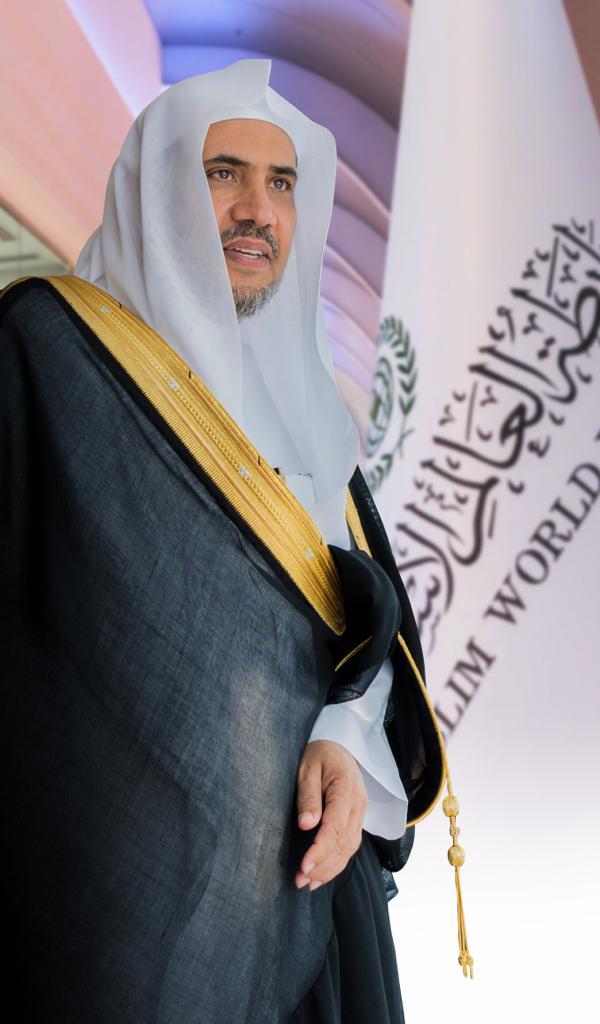
- Al-Issa in 2021

Secretary General of the Muslim World League
- Incumbent
- Assumed office 12 August 2016
- Preceded by: Abdallah Ben Abdel Mohsen At-Turki

Minister of Justice President of the Supreme Judicial Council
- In office 14 February 2009 – 29 January 2015
- Prime Minister: King Abdullah; King Salman
- Preceded by: Abdullah bin Muhammad Al Sheikh
- Succeeded by: Walid al-Samaani

Personal details
- Born: 10 June 1965 (age 61) Riyadh
- Education: Imam Muhammad bin Saud University (BA, PhD)

Mohammad bin Abdulkarim Al-Issa (Arabic: محمد بن عبد الكريم العيسى; born 9 June 1965) is a Saudi Arabian religious leader, Secretary General of the Muslim World League and former Saudi Minister of Justice.

He also serves as the chairman of the Centre for Responsible Leadership, a body of government, faith, media, business, and community leaders working together to solve the challenges facing humanity.

Sheikh Al-Issa is considered a leading global voice on moderate Islam as well as a key figure in the fight against extremist ideology. Religious leaders and government officials alike have commended him for his efforts to promote moderation, and cooperation and coexistence among all people.

Cardinal Timothy M. Dolan, Archbishop of New York referred to Sheikh Al-Issa as the "most eloquent spokesperson in the Islamic world for reconciliation and friendship among the religions of the world." In a meeting with the Church of Jesus Christ of Latter-day Saints, President Russell Nelson stated to Sheikh Al-Issa, "You are a peacemaker. You are a bridge builder. And we need more leaders like you." The American Jewish Committee has called Sheikh Al-Issa "the most powerful voice in the Muslim world promoting moderate Islam." Elan Carr, former U.S. Special Envoy to Monitor and Combat Anti-Semitism, said Sheikh Al-Issa "has chosen a future of tolerance and affection, where Jews and Christians can be embraced by their Muslim brethren.”

Ndileka Mandela, granddaughter of Noble laureate Nelson Mandela and head of the Thembekile Mandela Foundation, has praised Dr Sheikh Al-Issa as a "remarkable voice for Muslim tolerance and moderation". Australian Prime Minister Anthony Albanese has called Sheikh Al-Issa a “global voice for interfaith dialogue, and a leader in the fight against extremism and hate, his work continues to bring people together across faiths and cultures”.

In 2025, Sheikh Al-Issa was selected by the United Nations to serve as the in-person speaker at the United Nations first official commemoration of the International Day to Combat Islamophobia. In 2026, the Time magazine highlighted Sheikh Al-Issa's efforts in combating religious hatred through his leadership of the MWL. The magazine noted that Sheikh Al-Issa has “spent years dedicated to what he calls “preventive peace"—the idea that the time to bridge divides is before the fighting starts”.

== Early life and education ==
Sheikh Al-Issa was born in Riyadh on June 10, 1965. He obtained a Bachelor of Arts degree in Comparative Islamic Jurisprudence (Fiqh) at Imam Muhammad Ibn Saud Islamic University. Later, he received a master's degree and then a PhD degree in Comparative Judicial Studies as well as in Studies in General Law and Constitutional Law from the university's higher institute of the judiciary.

== Career ==
After graduation, Sheikh Al-Issa began to work at Imam Mohammed Ibn Saud Islamic University as a faculty member. He became vice president to the board of grievances (a legal body for arbitration) in 2007, and he served there until 2009.

On February 14, 2009, he was appointed the Minister of Justice in the Saudi cabinet, replacing Abdullah bin Muhammad Al Sheikh who had been in office since 1992. The appointment of Sheikh Al-Issa as the Minister of Justice was part of King Abdullah's reforms' initiatives.

As the justice minister, Sheikh Al-Issa oversaw reforms in several areas including legislative reforms in family matters, humanitarian cases, and for the rights of women.

Sheikh Al-Issa was appointed Secretary General of the Muslim World League (MWL) on August 4, 2016.

== Views ==
Sheikh Al-Issa argued in a lecture at Imam Muhammad bin Saud Islamic University in Riyadh in 2012 that Salafism was only an approach and that it should not be viewed as Islam. He further emphasized that the Salafi approach was moderate and meant following and obeying the ancestors' belief and values in regard to the understanding of Islam.

Sheikh Al-Issa acknowledges the horror of the Holocaust and denounced the efforts of Holocaust denial. He advocates for Muslim immigrants to Western countries to integrate socially.

In January 2020, he led a delegation to the Auschwitz concentration camp in Poland to mark the 75th anniversary of the camp's liberation from Nazis. In a speech on how Muslims and Jews can work together, Sheikh Al-Issa stated that the MWL is proud to stand "shoulder to shoulder" with the Jewish community to build better understanding, respect, and harmony.

In February 2020, Sheikh Al-Issa led a delegation of Islamic scholars to visit Srebrenica in Bosnia to pay respect at the Srebrenica-Potocari Genocide Memorial Centre.

The Washington Institute for Near East Policy documented MWL's post-2016 trajectory in a 2019 policy paper, concluding that the organization had been directed toward 'moderate Islam' under Sheikh Al-Issa's leadership. The U.S. Department of State's 2019 Country Reports on Terrorism cited Sheikh Al-Issa specifically for pressing 'a message of interfaith dialogue, religious tolerance, and peaceful coexistence with global religious authorities'.

== Honors ==
=== Hajj sermon, 2022 ===
In July 2022, the Custodian of the Two Holy Mosques King Salman bin Abdulaziz Al Saud appointed Sheikh Al-Issa the Khateeb of Hajj 1443 Hijri to deliver the hajj sermon from the pulpit of Masjid Nimra. The Hajj is the largest gathering of Muslims in the world and Dr Sheikh Al-Issa used the opportunity to advocate a moderate message of Islam promoting harmony and compassion.

He called on Muslims to avoid all that leads to "dissent, animosity, or division" and stressed that "our interactions are dominated by harmony and compassion”. His address further asked Muslims "not to give any mind to those who are insolent, have ulterior motives, or seek to obstruct him" in a bid to promote tolerance and understanding. Dr Sheikh Al-Issa underscored that Islam had an encompassing spirit whose goodness extended to all of humanity.

== Initiatives ==
=== Auschwitz visit ===
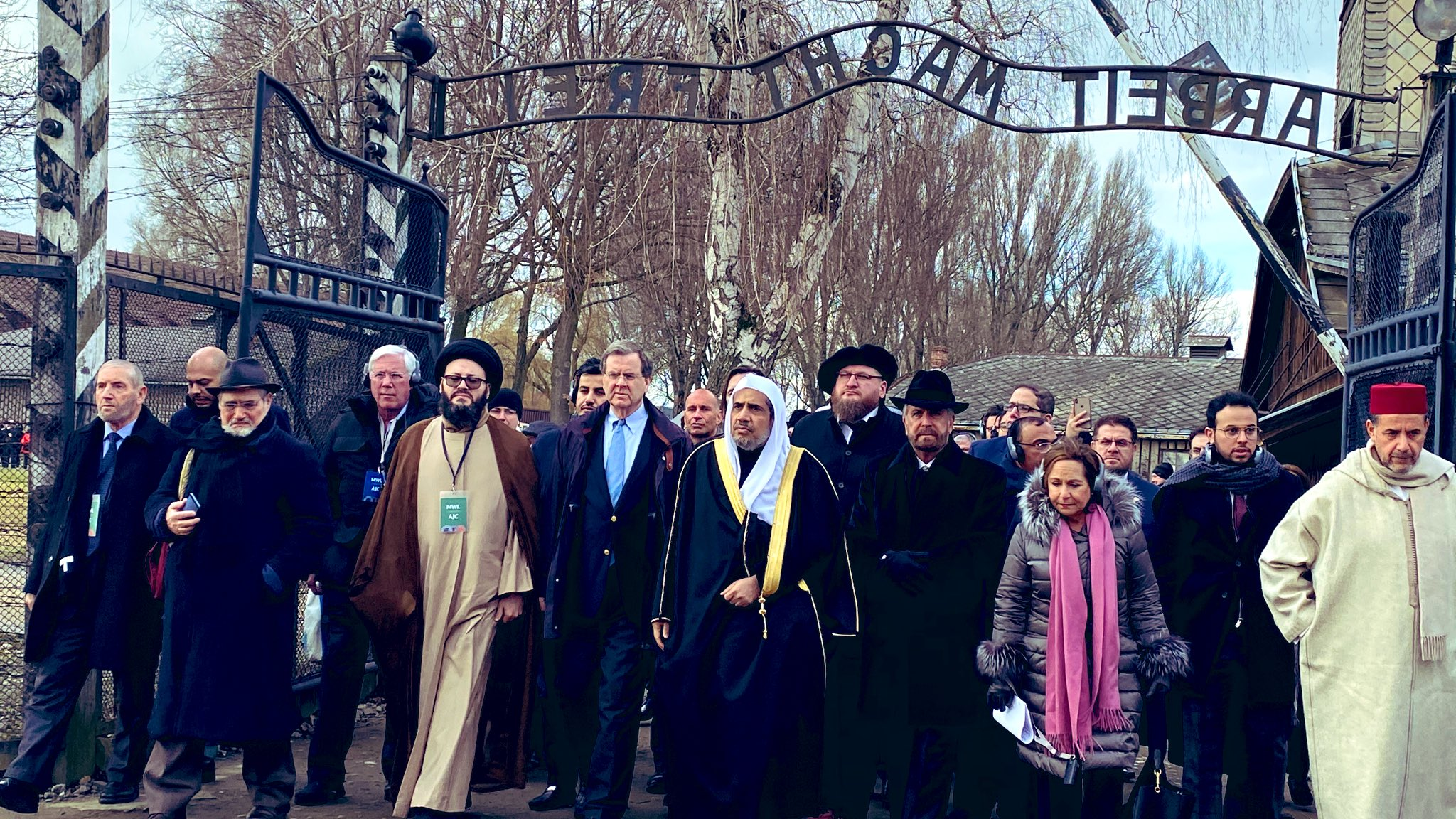
Dr Issa leads a delegation of Muslim leaders to Auschwitz Memorial in January 2020.

As the head of the MWL, Dr Sheikh Al-Issa collaborated with the American Jewish Committee (AJC) to lead a delegation of senior Muslim scholars and leaders to the Auschwitz concentration camp in January 2020. The delegation consisted of 62 Muslims, including 25 religious leaders from 28 countries.

The visit aimed at condemning the atrocities carried out against the Jews during the World War II and expressing solidarity in standing against oppressors. AJC CEO David Harris said Dr Sheikh Al-Issa's visit was the “most senior Islamic leadership delegation to ever visit Auschwitz or any Nazi German death camp”. Harris called the visit a "direct rebuttal to the extremists who threaten us all".

The visit was part of a Memorandum of Understanding that MWL and AJC signed in New York in April 2019, committing the two organizations to further Muslim-Jewish understanding and to cooperate against racism and extremism.

Bloomberg has noted Sheikh Al-Issa's sustained work against antisemitism and Holocaust denial. The Bloomberg said Sheikh Al-Issa had “for years has advocated against antisemitism and Holocaust denial, and led the most prominent Islamic delegation to Auschwitz".

=== Forum on Common Values among Religious Followers ===
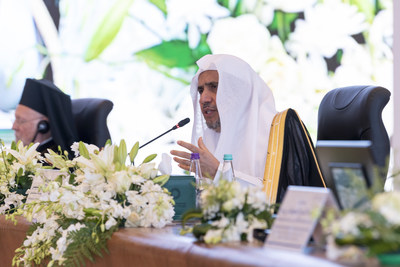
Dr Al-Issa at the Forum on Common Values among Religious Followers

Under Sheikh Al-Issa's guidance, MWL arranged a discussion and debate forum in Riyadh in May 2022 titled "Forum on Common Values among Religious Followers" that brought together senior Muslim scholars and leaders as well as leadership and scholars of other religions from across the world.

The forum brought leadership and followers of various religions together to discuss, appreciate and promote values that bind all religions. Combining common religious principles and international conventions, the forum issued a declaration of “Common Human Values” wherein participants agreed to affirm the centrality of religion in every civilization due to its influence in “shaping the ideas of human societies”.

The participants denounced the idea of an 'inevitable clash of civilizations' due to religious issues. The forum underscored that attempts to gain religious, cultural, political and economic advantages without respect for rights or ethics, and through forms of extremism, arrogance and racism, must be opposed. The participants also agreed that it was uncalled for to link religion and malpractices of some of its followers and that religion must not be employed for worldly purposes.

The event was cited as an effective initiative for engaging conflict parties, addressing grievances, and promote understanding on both sides of the political and religious divides.

=== Forum of Iraqi References ===
Sheikh Al-Issa led efforts to arrange a gathering of Iraqi religious leadership in the holy city of Makkah that aimed at promoting understanding and initiating dialogue between the differing adherents of Islam. Named "Forum of Iraqi References", the August 2021 event focused on discussing and developing frameworks on the roles of scholars in combatting sectarianism and religious extremism, promoting intra-faith coexistence, and providing support to Iraqi government efforts to achieve lasting peace. At the end of the conference, participants agreed to denounce sectarianism and urged coexistence, moderation, mutual respect and tolerance. They also called for “opening constructive dialogue channels” among the clerics to deal with various issues.

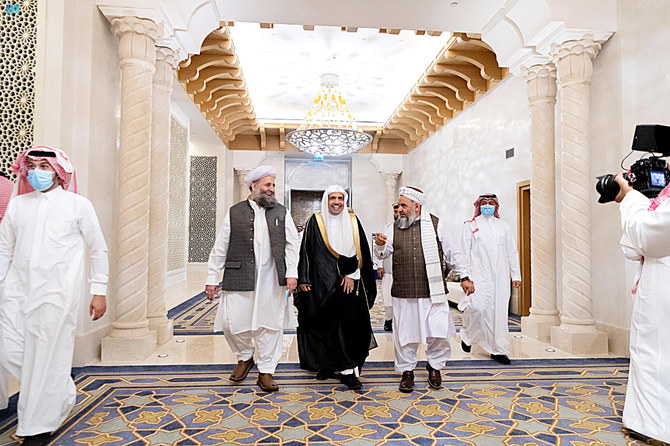
Dr Issa welcomes delegates at the Afghanistan conference in Makkah in June 2021

=== Conference on the Declaration of Peace in Afghanistan ===
In June 2021, Sheikh Al-Issa and the MWL convened a meeting of religious and political leadership from Afghanistan and Pakistan in the holy city of Makkah that devised a roadmap for attaining lasting peace in the war-torn country.

Following a full-day conference, an accord was signed that defined religious parameters to achieve a just and comprehensive peace and reconciliation process in Afghanistan in line with Islamic principles.

Noor-ul-Haq Qadri, then Federal Minister for Religious Affairs and Inter-faith Harmony in Pakistan, and Mohammad Qasim Halimi, then Minister of Hajj and Religious Affairs of Afghanistan signed the agreement.

Sheikh Al-Issa had said that the conference had highlighted the strong resolve "of our brothers in the meeting to advance peace in Afghanistan".

=== The Charter of Makkah ===
The Charter of Makkah, endorsed in May 2019, was an effort led by the MWL under Dr Sheikh Al-Issa. The Charter was formulated to create a pan-Islamic set of principles that support anti-extremism, religious and cultural diversity, tolerance, and legislation against hate and violence.

The document was declared at the end of the four-day conference organized by the MWL in Makkah. It was approved by Islamic leaders of 139 countries and signed by around 1,200 prominent Muslim figures.

At the conference, more than 1,000 religious scholars representing 128 countries discussed ways to come up with a plan to address sectarianism and extremism within Islam and stressed the need to create channels of communication between the different schools of Islam.

=== Columbia University Interfaith Research Lab ===
In 2022, Sheikh Al-Issa and the MWL provided funding to establish the International Interfaith Research Lab at Teachers College, Columbia University. The launch included participation by Cardinal Timothy Dolan, Archbishop of New York, and Rabbi Arthur Schneier.

== Faith For Our Planet ==
Sheikh Al-Issa is the founder and chairman of Faith for Our Planet (FFOP), a global interfaith climate coalition of environmentalists, religious leaders bureaucrats, politicians, and researchers. Launched in 2022, its aim is to mobilize the influence of faith and faith leaders to address the increasing threat to the planet posed by climate change. Through FFOP, Dr Sheikh Al-Issa envisions providing the world with a platform where faiths, faith leaders and faith communities can come together to find ways for climate change mitigation and for preservation of our planet.

=== Training Workshops ===
Since June 2022, FFOP has initiated a series of workshops aimed at engaging religious and community leaders in addressing climate change and environmental degradation. These workshops have been held in cities such as Islamabad, London, Banjul, Dhaka, and Kigali, training over 250 diverse stakeholders to lead faith-based climate action in their communities.

=== Youth Interfaith Fellowship on Climate Change ===
In January 2023, FFOP launched the world's first-ever global Youth Interfaith Fellowship on Climate Change in partnership with the Duke Divinity School. The fellowship, offered on an annual basis, is a fully funded residential program focusing on vocational training and capacity building for impact-driven faith-based climate action.

=== FFOP at UNGA ===
In September 2023, FFOP hosted an event, “Faith in Her”, during the 78th session of the UNGA in New York. The event aimed to highlight the role of women in faith in climate leadership, existing systemic barriers to their participation, and how and why these barriers must be overcome. Over 75 representatives from FBOs, civil society, and environmental organizations were in attendance. Faith in Her culminated in the FFOP Declaration of Inclusivity, a series of recommendations for faith institutions and FBOs to build capacity for women of faith, particularly women of color and in the Global South to participate in climate leadership and negotiations. The Declaration was inspired in spirit and structure by the MWL's Charter of Makkah.

=== FFOP at COP28 ===
FFOP hosted a side event at the Faith Pavilion at COP28 in Dubai, UAE in December 2023. The event focused on how religious giving can potentially unlock substantial resources exceeding a trillion dollars to bridge the global climate financing gap. A report on the theme of religious philanthropy was also launched at this platform, produced by FFOP in partnership with the Duke Divinity School at Duke University, USA. Over 50 faith leaders, policymakers and youth representatives from across the globe attended the event, which was also live streamed on the Faith Pavilion's official YouTube channel.

=== FFOP at COP 29 ===
FFOP hosted a discussion at the United Nations COP29's Faith Pavilion titled “Climate Action as a Conflict Resolution Tool within Multi-Faith Communities”. The session discussed how communities could bridge interfaith divides by addressing shared environmental challenges, and working collaboratively.

== International Engagements ==
=== International Religious Forum 2022 ===
In March 2022, Dr Sheikh Al-Issa delivered the opening address at the Global Faith Forum 2022, hosted by three states known as significant centers of the Evangelical community in the United States: Texas, Kansas, and Maryland. At this gathering, the Secretary-General of the MWL introduced the Charter of Makkah and highlighted the need to overcome differences in the pursuit of progress. Following the Forum, Sheikh Al-Issa held meetings with various Evangelical leaders from the host states.

=== Kazakhstan Conference of Religious Leaders 2022 ===
In September 2022, Sheikh Al-Issa was invited by the President of Kazakhstan to deliver a keynote address at the Kazakhstan Conference of Religious Leaders in the presence of guests including Pope Francis.

=== R20 Summit 2022 ===
In November 2022, Sheikh Al-Issa collaborated with Joko Widodo, President of Indonesia, and Yahya Cholil Staquf, General Chairman of Nahdlatul Ulama (Indonesian Ulema Council) to convene an inaugural gathering of religious leaders in Bali, Indonesia.

Founded by the MWL and the Nahdlatul Ulama, the R20 platform was adopted as the first official engagement group on religion in the G20, making the R20 Summit Group of 20's first Religion Forum. The two-day event brought together more than 400 participants, including 160 inter-religious figures from 20 of the world's largest economies, to discuss contemporary global challenges and the role religious leaders needed to play to address them. At the end of the Summit, the G20 Presidency was symbolically transferred from Indonesia to India, underscoring the continuity of efforts in fostering positive dialogue and collaboration.

=== Abu Dhabi Peace Forum 2022 ===
Sheikh Al-Issa delivered the keynote address at the opening session of the Abu Dhabi Peace Forum in November 2022, where he stressed that “peace is a core value in Islam, which is a religion of peace and strengthens the values of peace, tolerance and coexistence, and values human dignity”. The event was attended by senior international political, religious, intellectual, and academic figures.

=== International Interfaith Research Lab at Columbia ===
Sheikh Al-Issa launched the International Interfaith Research Lab at Columbia University's Teachers College in November 2022. The Lab was established through a grant by the MWL to promote efforts to combat hate speech and hate crimes. Headed by Dr Amra Sabic-El-Rayess, Teachers’ College Associate Professor of Practice, the lab aims to foster a culture of resilience, serving as a center of excellence for research, leadership, and training.

=== 2023 UK Visit ===
In March 2023, Sheikh Al-Issa embarked on a visit to the UK aimed at advancing interfaith harmony, cooperation, dialogue, and environmental protection.

During his trip, Dr Sheikh Al-Issa engaged with the British Parliament, delivering a lecture on the Islamic and human values encompassed in the Charter of Makkah, as well as the Monarchy, making him the first prominent Muslim figure to be received by King Charles III at Buckingham Palace following his ascension to the throne.

Sheikh Al-Issa's engagements also extended to the UK's Foreign, Commonwealth & Development Office (FCDO) and the Defense Academy of the United Kingdom, where he met with ambassadors, students, and officers and discussed how religious values called for protection of the environment.

The visit also included the first-ever conference of Muslim Religious Leaders in Europe, convened on behalf of MWL and presided over by Sheikh Al-Issa. This event, attended by more than 300 Muslim leaders, focused on understanding the major issues facing the European Muslim community and addressing its most pressing concerns. It concluded with the establishment of a London-based independent body, including a Fatwa and religious guidance committee, and approved the Charter of Makkah for training Muslim Imams in Europe.

Sheikh Al-Issa also met with several faith leaders, including Rabbi Ephraim Mirvis, the Chief Rabbi of the United Hebrew Congregations in the UK; HE Cardinal Vincent Collins, the Archbishop of Westminster; and Justin Welby, Archbishop of Canterbury. These meetings focused on cooperation for promoting interfaith peace-building efforts, confronting hate speech, and criminalizing acts that insult any religious sanctity.

=== Meeting With Pope Francis ===
In May 2023, Sheikh Al-Issa was invited by Pope Francis at his residence in Santa Marta, Vatican. Sheikh Al-Issa said the two of them discussed “shared values and building bridges between civilizations based on effective and sustainable initiatives. I appreciate Pope Francis's kind hospitality and noble sentiments”.

Sheikh Al-Issa has been promoting Saudi Arabia's vision of interfaith dialogue. He met with Pope Francis again in December 2024 to inaugurate the Islamic Studies and Arabic Language Award at the Catholic University of the Sacred Heart in Milan.

=== Building Bridges of Understanding and Peace Between East and West Initiative ===
In June 2023, Sheikh Al-Issa inaugurated the “Building Bridges of Understanding and Peace Between East and West” initiative at the United Nations Headquarters, New York. The session featured speeches from global and religious leaders, including Csaba Korosi, Amina Mohammed, Arthur C. Wilson, Martin Luther King III, and Sir Ephraim Yitzchak Mirvis, stressing the urgent need for interreligious and intercultural dialogue for the shared goal of global peace and prosperity.

=== 2023 India Visit ===
In July 2023, Sheikh Al-Issa undertook a visit to India that spanned five days. During his time in the country, he voiced concerns about the surge in global conflicts, particularly highlighting the negative role played by terrorist organizations. Through an interview with the news agency ANI, Sheikh Al-Issa clarified that the ideologies of Islam and terrorism are distinct, emphasizing that they "have nothing to do with each other."

Sheikh Al-Issa also led the Friday prayers at Delhi's Jama Masjid. This occasion was notably significant as he became the first individual from outside India to assume this role at the revered mosque in over four centuries. Additionally, he visited the Akshardham Temple in Delhi. There, he advocated for universal peace and harmony, underscoring the importance of love and unity, irrespective of the underlying reasons for global conflicts.

The tense relations between Muslims and Hindus in the region in general called for this visit. During the visit, Sheikh Al-Issa worked to bring points of view closer and to talk with officials in India about the Islamic community and the importance of their rights. He addressed the Islamic community on the importance of coexistence, harmony, and interaction with society.

=== The Role of Media in Inciting Hatred and Violence ===
In November 2023, Sheikh Al-Issa led the International Day of Solidarity with the Palestinian People with a Media International Forum in Jeddah. The gathering discussed The Role of Media in Inciting Hatred and Violence: Risks of Misinformation and Bias. The event was attended by Palestine's President Mahmoud Abbas over telephone.

The forum issued the 'Jeddah Charter for Media Responsibility' that was ratified by delegations from over 80 countries, represented by senior religious leaders, media figures, and diplomats.

=== Conference on Religious Leaders Promoting Interfaith Harmony ===
In May 2024, Sheikh Al-Issa and Prime Minister of Malaysia Anwar Ibrahim hosted one of the largest gatherings of religious leaders in Kuala Lumpur. Titled Promoting Interfaith Harmony among Followers of Religions, the gathering brought together about 2,000 religious and intellectual figures from 57 countries. It discussed various themes, including pluralism, tolerance, moderation, education, building bridges, and inclusive commonalities.

It also discussed the importance of religion in promoting world peace, consolidating solidarity among peoples, and exploring ways of civilizational cooperation.

=== International Conference on Faith in a Changing World ===
In October 2024, Sheikh Al-Issa’s helped convene an international conference in Rabat titled Faith in a Changing World, held under the patronage of the King of Morocco, Mohammed VI.

The conference discussed faith and atheism, and how to effectively bridge the divide. It was attended by noted religious, and civil society leaders that included Dr Salim M Al Malik, Director-General (DG) of the Islamic World Educational, Scientific and Cultural Organization (IESCO), Archbishop of Rabat Cardinal Cristóbal López Romero, Chair holder of the UNESCO Chair on Religious Pluralism and Peace Prof Alberto Melloni, the Grand Mufti of Egypt Muhammad Mukhtar Gomaa, and Executive Director of the World Faiths Development Dialogue, Georgetown University Prof Katherine Marshall. The conference issued the "Charter of Faith in a Changing World".

=== International Conference on Girl's Education in Muslim Communities ===
In January 2025, Sheikh Al-Issa convened a conference in Islamabad to support girls’ education in the Muslim world. The international conference was convened under the patronage of Prime Minister of Pakistan Shehbaz Sharif.

The two-day conference was attended by participants from many OIC states, ambassadors, religious scholars and muftis, representatives from global organizations including UNESCO, UNICEF, and the World Bank. The conference led to a consensus among religious scholars from various Islamic schools of thought and sects on the right to education for Muslim girls. Nobel Laureate Malala Yousafzai also attended the conference to support the right to education for Muslim girls. Rolling Stone UK said the delegates, "including human rights advocates like Nobel laureate Malala Yousafzai, state leaders, UNICEF, and even the most conservative Islamic sects – formed an unlikely but critical alliance".

The conference concluded with the issuance of the Islamabad Declaration that establishes an irrevocable right to education for all Muslim girls. It was endorsed by senior muftis, leading scholars, their jurisprudential councils, representatives of Islamic bodies and councils, academic institutions, governmental and non-governmental international organizations and global activists. According to Rolling Stone UK, "Sheikh Al-Issa is not just a religious leader – he is a reformer, a bridge-builder, and a voice of moral clarity in a time of division. And the Islamabad Declaration may be his greatest achievement to date." According to Financial Times, the Islamabad Declaration "reclaims Islam’s core principles by declaring girls’ education not just a religious obligation but a cornerstone of societal progress".

The Independent said in an article that the Islamabad Declaration "has created fractures in the Taliban, and sends a message to Muslim groups worldwide that their faith is a force that protects women’s rights".

=== Duke University Lecture ===
In May 2025, Sheikh Al-Issa delivered a lecture at Duke University focused on the rich legacy and multifaceted contributions of Islamic civilization in the fields of science and literature. His lecture covered Islam’s historical achievements in politics, administration, and social development, particularly its influence on legislation, human rights, philosophy, and the arts.

=== Afghanistan Visit 2025 ===
In July 2025, Sheikh Al-Issa undertook a visit to Afghanistan, meeting the top leadership of the Taliban government, including Prime Minister Mullah Mohammad Hasan Akhund, Deputy Prime Minister Mullah Abdul Salam Hanafi, Foreign Affairs Minister Mawlawi Amir Khan Muttaqi, and Interior Minister Khalifa Sirajuddin Haqqani.

His visit included numerous high-profile engagements that discussed the need for Islamic unity, the role of Muslim scholars in addressing contemporary challenges through dialogue, and core Islamic values of justice, preservation of rights, and principles of moderation and mercy. One of the key areas of discussion was the persistent of deeply rooted customs and traditions that contradicted Sharia.

=== World Economic Forum in Davos 2026 ===
Sheikh Al-Issa was a speaker at the main dialogue session at the World Economic Forum in Davos in 2026. In his speech, he highlighted the importance of religious leaders supporting and endorsing the New York Declaration. The session, led by Centre for Regions, Trade and Geopolitics, discussed the role religious leaders can play to rebuild trust and bring forth peace in the world.

=== Conference at George Washington University ===
In February 2026, Sheikh Al-Issa was invited by the president of the George Washington University, Dr. Ellen M. Granberg, to participate in a conference on anti-Semitism titled “Challenging Extremism, Antisemitism, and Hate: From the Middle East to U.S. Colleges”. He also led discussions on the general concept of hatred and hostility toward followers of religions and ethnicities. Sheikh Al-Issa said hate speech was “the cry of the ignorant and the weak”, and had resulted in destructive wars.

Other speakers at the conference included Pierre Gentin, General Counsel of the US Department of Commerce, and Her Excellency Audrey Azoulay, Director-General of UNESCO.

=== US Congressional Honor ===
In February 2026, members of the US Congress honoured Sheikh Al-Issa for his efforts to combat hate and promote coexistence among religions of the world. Lawmakers from both Republican and Democratic, including members of House of Representatives and the Senate, took part in the ceremony held at the Capitol Hill. Both Sheikh Al-Issa and MWL were recognized for their role to strengthen social cohesion and countering racism.

=== Visit to Australia ===
In April 2026, Sheikh Al-Issa visited Australia and held meetings with Prime Minister Anthony Albanese, senior Australian officials, and leaders of the Australian Muslim community.

In their meeting, Albanese and the MWL secretary general discussed the importance of building social cohesion across diverse societies through mutual respect and cooperation, and deepening bonds between nations and people. Sheikh Al-Issa also met the Australian National Imams Council and the United Muslims of Australia.

=== Visit to Nigeria ===
In August 2026, Sheikh Al-Issa visited Nigeria to participate in an interfaith peace conference and meet the Nigerian leadership. During his trip, he met with Nigerian President Bola Ahmed Tinubu, National Security Adviser Nuhu Ribadu, various government officials, and Muslim and Christian religious leaders.

He delivered a keynote address at the international conference "Diversity and Social Peace: A Partnership for a Promising Future" in Abuja, held under the patronage of the Nigerian president. At the conference, religious leaders and civil society representatives adopted the "Abuja Declaration", which outlines a joint action plan for government institutions, religious leaders, and civil society organizations on conflict prevention and counter extremist narratives.

Sheikh Al-Issa also chaired a roundtable titled "Religion and Building Social Harmony." During the roundtable, several memoranda of understanding were signed between the MWL and the Interfaith Mediation Centre, and between Muslim and Christian organizations in Nigeria. A newly established Coordinating Body for Religious and Civic Leaders and Institutions in West Africa was tasked with overseeing implementation of these agreements. Sheikh Al-Issa additionally delivered the Friday sermon and led prayers at the National Mosque in Abuja.

=== Somalia Visit ===
In September 2026, Sheikh Al-Issa made his first visit to Somalia, holding meetings with government officials and religious scholars in Mogadishu. He was received by Mukhtar Robow, Somalia's Minister of Endowments and Islamic Affairs, and by Mohamed Amin Sheikh Osman, Somalia's ambassador to Saudi Arabia.

During his visit, Sheikh Al-Issa took part in the forum, "Somalia at the Heart of the Islamic World", along with members of the Somali Council of Scholars and other religious figures. The event focused on the role of religious scholars in countering extremist ideologies that participants described as contrary to the traditions and values of Somali society.

Sheikh Al-Issa also met Somali President Hassan Sheikh Mohamud at the presidential palace in Mogadishu. The MWL said the talks covered the League's religious, intellectual and humanitarian contributions in Somalia. According to Arab News, the president commended MWL's support for the Somali people.

=== AI For Everyone Initiative ===
In September 2026, Sheikh Al-Issa led an MWL event in New York during the high level week at the 81st session of the United Nations General Assembly.

The event, titled "AI for Everyone: Faith, Human Dignity and Artificial Intelligence", was organised with the support and participation of the United Nations.

The United Nations Alliance of Civilizations (UNAOC) described it as an MWL side event under the title "AI for Everyone: Advancing Access and Opportunity in the Age of AI".

Besides Sheikh Al-Issa; Miguel Ángel Moratinos, UN Under-Secretary-General and High Representative for the UNAOC; and Ismail Ould Cheikh Ahmed, Secretary-General of the Organisation of Islamic Cooperation, were also in attendance.

Discussions centred on the importance of diverse international, religious and civilisational perspectives in AI ethics, with initial attention to AI-generated content that promotes hatred, violence or conflict between civilisations for ideological or religious motives.

In his remarks, Moratinos warned that AI was advancing faster than existing institutions and safeguards, and argued that "AI for Everyone" should mean technology that benefits, and is accountable to, all people.

Al-Issa announced that the MWL intended to establish an AI laboratory with technology companies to develop programmes for religious, educational and humanitarian institutions, to digitise a number of Islamic and Arabic sources and make them available to AI companies while respecting intellectual property rights, and to set up a unit to monitor and correct errors in translations of Islamic texts, which he said had given rise to serious misconceptions.

=== Visit to Belgium (2026) ===
In early October 2026, Sheikh Al-Issa visited Brussels where he met Belgian federal officials, European Parliament representatives and leaders of Belgium's Muslim community. According to the Saudi Press Agency, he was received by Peter De Roover, President of the Belgian Chamber of Representatives, at the federal parliament, where the two discussed dialogue as a peaceful means of addressing cross-border international crises and the role of religious institutions in defusing conflicts before they erupt.

During the trip, Sheikh Al-Issa also met Belgian Interior Minister Bernard Quintin for discussions on religious, intellectual and security issues

He also met European Parliament officials to discuss cooperation on implementing Article 17 of the Treaty on the Functioning of the European Union, the provision under which EU institutions maintain regular dialogue with churches and religious and non-confessional organisations.

The Belgian Ministry of Foreign Affairs also hosted a dialogue with Sheikh Al-Issa at the Egmont Palace under the theme "The Importance of Dialogue in a Changing World", attended by ministers, parliamentarians, representatives of European governments, senior religious leaders, and representatives of international organisations, universities and civil society. He was received by Deputy Prime Minister and Minister of Foreign Affairs Maxime Prévot.

Speaking to Euronews during the visit, Al-Issa described dialogue as essential to resolving conflicts and said he was not concerned by the rise of the hard right in some European countries, citing his confidence in national constitutions, constitutional courts and societal values.

He also met leaders and figures of Belgium's Muslim community, praising their contribution to coexistence and welcoming their participation in both MWL’s Islamic and interfaith forums.

=== G20 Interfaith Forum (2026) ===
On October 15, 2026, Sheikh Al-Issa delivered the opening keynote address as guest of honour at the G20 Interfaith Forum (IF20). The event was held at the Tabernacle on Temple Square in Salt Lake City, Utah under the theme "Resilient Hope, Shared Future".

It was the first time that the annual forum, which meets in the country holding the G20 presidency, had been held in the United States.

In his address, Sheikh Al-Issa called on faith communities to advance peace, mutual understanding and human dignity, and said that differences between people "should not be a threat, nor an incitement to clash and conflict".

He described hope as an active choice, stating that "hope is a decision taken by people who work hard for a better tomorrow", and denounced hate speech as a path towards exclusion and violence.

The opening ceremony was also addressed by Dallin H. Oaks, President of The Church of Jesus Christ of Latter-day Saints, and Utah Governor Spencer Cox.

=== Averroes event in Córdoba (2026) ===
On 10 November 2026, Sheikh Al-Issa co-presided over an international event in Córdoba, Spain, with Miguel Ángel Moratinos, High Representative for the United Nations Alliance of Civilizations (UNAOC).

The event was titled "International Year of Ibn Rushd/Averroes: An Opportunity for Reason". It was held at the Palacio de Congresos de Córdoba to mark 900 years since the birth of the Córdoba-born philosopher Averroes (Ibn Rushd).

The event was co-organised by the Muslim World League, the UNAOC and Espacio Tierra Creativa, with the support of UNESCO, the Regional Government of Andalusia, the Provincial Council of Córdoba and Córdoba City Council. The Mayor of Córdoba, José María Bellido, was also in attendance.

According to Arab News, the MWL described the event as the first of its kind since the end of Muslim rule in Al-Andalus, and said it had chosen Averroes because of the recognition his work commands across cultures.

In a promotional video released ahead of the event, Moratinos said Averroes "belongs to all of humanity" and “showed that there was an opportunity for reason”.

Following the event, Sheikh Al-Issa met the Bishop of Córdoba, Jesús Fernández González, and the cathedral's dean, Joaquín Alberto Nieva at the García Mosque–Cathedral of Córdoba.

== Awards and Recognitions ==
Since taking over the MWL in 2016, Sheikh Al-Issa has received a number of awards and recognitions from a wide range of prominent international institutions and government officials.

- October 2020: The Royal Islamic Strategic Studies Centre named Sheikh Al-Issa one of the most influential Muslims globally in its 2020 edition of “The Muslim 500: The World's Most Influential Muslims.”
- June 2020: Sheikh Al-Issa received the inaugural Combat Anti-Semitism Award from the Combat Anti-Semitism Movement and the American Sephardi Federation for his contributions to the fight against anti-semitism and racism.
- August 2019: Sheikh Al-Issa was awarded the “Children of Abraham” Award alongside the head of the Foundation for Ethnic Understanding, Rabbi Marc Schneier by the Florence School of Advanced Studies for Interreligious and Intercultural Dialogue at the 40th annual Rimini Meeting.
- July 2019: Senegal's President Macky Sall awarded Sheikh Al-Issa the Grand Order of the State in recognition of his efforts to promote religious understanding and harmony, and humanitarian programs around the world.
- February 2019: Sheikh Al-Issa received the World's Religions Peace Award from the National Council on US-Arab Relations for his international efforts to promote interfaith peace and harmony.
- November 2018: Sheikh Al-Issa received the 2018 Moderation Prize from Makkah Governor Prince Khaled Al-Faisal for his efforts to combat extremist and terrorist ideology and promote moderation and peace.
- July 2018: Sheikh Al-Issa received the 2018 Galileo International Award from the Galileo Foundation in Florence, Italy for his international achievements and leadership in promoting religious and cultural unity.
- 2020: Honorary Doctorate in Science, Alfa BK University, Belgrade
- August 2021: Prophet's Hijra Award by Malaysia.
- In November 2021, Sheikh Al-Issa received the Bridge Builder Award from the Nobel Peace Center, alongside Dr. Ioan Sauca, General Secretary of the World Council of Churches, in recognition of his sustained efforts to promote interfaith dialogue and build bridges between religious communities.
- February 2022: Honorary Doctorate in Law from Pattani University, Thailand.
- February 2022: Order of the Republic awarded by President of the Republic of Maldives Mr Ibrahim Mohamed Solih.
- October 2022: Hilal-e-Pakistan, second-highest civil award of the Islamic Republic of Pakistan, awarded by President Arif Alvi.
- October 2022: National Order of Merit, awarded by His Excellency President of the Islamic Republic of Mauritania Mohamed Ould Cheikh AI-Ghazwani.
- October 2022: Honorary Medal from the Congress of Leaders of World and Traditional Religions presented by Kazakh Ambassador to Saudi Arabia.
- November 2022: America Abroad Media presented Sheikh Al-Issa with an award for his commentary about how Muslims are portrayed in Western films.
- November 2022: Abu Dhabi Forum for Peace Award for consolidating peace in Muslim societies.
- 2024: Honorary Postdoctoral Senior Fellowship in Law, University of Bologna
- 2024: The 'Mother Teresa' Decoration, Albania
- 2024: The State Order for World-Renowned Spiritual Figures, Albania
- 2024: Presidential Award, Republic of Malawi
- 2024: Ambassador of International Peace Award, The Gambia
- 2024: National Order of Merit, Mauritania
- 2024: Awarded "Key to Sarajevo" by Benjamina Karić, Mayor of Sarajevo

== Publications ==
=== 2026 ===
US framing of Iran war may lead to more violent extremism

=== 2025 ===
Congratulating Christians on Christmas is permissible - and reflects Islam's higher purposes

Twenty years after 7/7, Britain needs a national compact with its Muslim citizens

We must face the truth: migration is not 'a crisis', it's a symptom

=== 2024 ===
There has never been a more dangerous time to be a British Muslim | The Telegraph

It is high time that Norway resumes its role as a global peace builder | AftenPosten

This Ramadan, Muslim world can end gender apartheid in Afghanistan | Euronews

Avoiding the Demonization Trap Over Gaza | Wall Street Journal

A Muslim faith leader calls for stronger moral leadership in the Middle East | The Economist

=== 2023 ===
Swedes and Muslims must not fall into the trap of Koran burners | Dagens Nyheter

We Must Guard Against the Dangers of AI and Religious Extremism |Newsweek

What a genocide survivor and a Muslim leader learn fighting 'great replacement theory |USA Today

=== 2022 ===
Biden's silent bid to end terrorism | Washington Times

Women are the missing key to tackling climate change in the Muslim World | Euractiv

=== 2021 ===
Islamic scholars can turn the Taliban towards moderation | Times of London

To save Muslim lives, let Muslims tell their own stories | Washington Post

Religion's Role in Climate Conversations | Newsweek

Ramadan a chance to dispel vaccinations myths across Islamic world | The Sydney Morning Herald

Social media brings out the hate in individuals | The Washington Times

=== 2020 ===
Muslims need to advance justice, community welfare this election | The Detroit News

As Muslims, we stand with Jews to pledge: Never again |Jewish News

How Auschwitz has united Muslims and Jews | Chicago Tribune

=== 2019 ===
Muslims and Latter-day Saints can be leaders in building tolerance | Deseret News

As Head of the Muslim World League, I See Islamic Leaders Calling for Tolerance More Than Ever | Newsweek

A Ramadan for the world | The Washington Times

My advice to Rashida Tlaib and Ilhan Omar | Fox News

I Lead the Muslim World League. Here is Why I Broke Taboos To Acknowledge the Holocaust | Newsweek

Why Muslims from around the world should remember the Holocaust? | Washington Post

== Positions ==
Non-profit organization positions
Preceded by Abdallah Ben Abdel Mohsen At-Turki	Secretary General of Muslim World League; 2016 –	Succeeded by

Political offices
Preceded by Abdullah Aal Al Sheikh	Minister of Justice; 2009 – 2015	Succeeded by Waleed Al-Samani
