= Mohammad Al Subail =

Saudi imam and preacher (1924–2012)

His Excellency Sheikh Mohammad bin Abdullah Al-Subail
- Title: Imam * Khatib * Sheikh

Personal life
- Born: 1924 Bukayriyah, Al-Qassim Province, Saudi Arabia
- Died: December 17, 2012 (aged 87–88)
- Notable work: Author of 27 books
- Education: Memorized Quran, Sheikh Abd al-Rahman al-Kuraides, Sheikh Saadi Yassin, Sheikh Abdul Aziz Al-Sabeel, Sheikh Muhammad Al-Muqbil and Sheikh Abdullah bin Humaid
- Known for: Serving as the imam and preacher of Masjid al-Haram for 44 years, President Of General Presidency of the affairs of the two holy mosques, member of the Council of Senior Scholars.
- Occupation: Imam, preacher, member of the Council of Senior Scholars, head of Al-Masjid al-Haram and Masjid al-Nabawi affairs, author

Religious life
- Religion: Islam
- Denomination: Sunni
- Jurisprudence: Hanbali
- Creed: Athari
- Movement: Salafism

Muslim leader
- Period in office: 1385-1429

Mohammad bin Abdullah al-Subail (Arabic: محمد بن عبد الله السبيل; 1924 - 17 December 2012), was born in the city of Al Bukayriyah in the Al-Qassim Province. He was the imam and preacher of the Masjid al-Haram for forty-four years in general, a member of the Council of Senior Scholars, and a member of the Islamic Fiqh Assembly, and the President of the affairs of Al-Masjid al-Haram and Masjid al-Nabawi, and the head of the Al-Haram Committee in the Kingdom of Saudi Arabia.

He made more than 100 advocacy trips outside the Kingdom, covering more than 50 countries, and authored 27 books.

He is known for his unique Najdi style recitations, and his son Omar also have similar recitations as him.

== Education ==
He memorized the Quran and was educated at the hands of his father and by Sheikh Abd al-Rahman al-Kuraides. At the age of fourteen, he improved the recitation of the Qur'an at the hands of Sheikh Saadi Yassin. He took legal knowledge from his brother Sheikh Abdul Aziz Al-Sabeel, Sheikh Muhammad Al-Muqbil and Sheikh Abdullah bin Humaid.

== Career ==
Between 1373 AH and 1385, H.E. Sheikh Subail served as a supervisor at the Scientific Institute in Buraidah. He was appointed the imam, preacher and a teacher in Masjid al-Haram in 1385 AH, a position he served until 1429 AH. He also served as the head of teachers and observers in the presidency of religious supervision of the Grand Mosque. In 1393 AH, he became the Deputy President to the Head of Religious Supervision of the Grand Mosque. Subsequently he was made the President of the General Presidency for the affairs of the Grand Mosque and the Prophet's Mosque in 1411 AH.

Subail served as a member of the Council of Senior Scholars in the Kingdom of Saudi Arabia between 1413 AH and 1427 AH. He remained a member of the Islamic Fiqh Council of the Muslim World League between 1397 AH and 1432 AH. He frequently participated in the Noor on the Path program on the Holy Quran Radio in Saudi Arabia. His students included Saleh Al-Fawzan, Abdulrahman bin Abdulaziz Al Kelya and Muqbil bin Hadi al-Wadi'i.

Sheikh Al-Subayyil laid the foundation stone of Jamia Asria in Jhelum, Pakistan in 1997.

== Death ==
He died on Monday, 3 Safar 1434 AH, corresponding to December 17, 2012. His funeral prayer was led by Sheikh Saleh ibn Abdallah Humayd.
