= Abd Allah ibn Humayd =

Saudi Islamic scholar (1911–1982)

- عبد الله ابن حميد

Personal life
- Born: c. 1911 Riyadh, Emirate of Riyadh
- Died: c. 1982 Mecca, Saudi Arabia
- Children: Salih al-Humaid

Religious life
- Religion: Islam
- Denomination: Sunni
- Jurisprudence: Hanbali
- Creed: Athari
- Movement: Salafism

Muslim leader
- Influenced by: Muhammad ibn Ibrahim Al ash-Sheikh
- Influenced: Muqbil al-Wadi'i, Salih ibn Humayd

Abd Allah ibn Humayd (Note: Arabic: عبد الله بن محمد ابن حميد, romanized: ʿAbd Allāh ibn Muḥammad ibn Ḥumayd) (1911–1982) was a Saudi Islamic scholar and judge, who served as the Chief Justice of Saudi Arabia and Imam of the Great Mosque of Mecca.

He was succeeded as Great Mosque imam by his son Salih ibn Humayd.

== Early life and education ==
Abd Allah ibn Humayd was born in Riyadh in 1329 AH (1911 CE) during Ramadan and grew up in a supportive environment despite losing his sight in childhood. He memorized the Quran at a young age and studied diligently under various scholars in Riyadh, displaying exceptional proficiency in diverse disciplines.

== Career ==
Abd Allah ibn Humayd began his career under the mentorship of Muhammad ibn Ibrahim Al ash-Sheikh. In 1357 AH (1938 AD), he was appointed by King Abdulaziz as a judge in Riyadh, marking the beginning of his judicial career. He expanded his judicial responsibilities in 1363 AH (1944 AD), when he became the judge of Buraidah. By 1377 AH (1957 AD).

Abd Allah ibn Humayd was appointed by King Faisal as the Head of Religious Affairs for the Great Mosque of Mecca. Later, under King Khalid, Abd Allah ibn Humayd held several high-ranking positions including President of the Supreme Judicial Council and a member of the Council of Senior Scholars starting from 1395 AH (1975 AD). Additionally, he was a founding member of the Muslim World League.

== Works ==
He is the author of "Jihad in the Quran and Sunnah".
