= Mohammed bin Jubair =

Saudi Arabian politician

Mohammed bin Ibrahim bin Jubair

Chairman of the Majlis ash-Shura
- In office August 1993 – 10 January 2002
- Preceded by: Fahd bin Abdulaziz Al Saud
- Succeeded by: Salih bin Abdullah al Humaid

Minister of Justice
- In office 1989–1992
- Preceded by: Ibrahim ibn Muhammad Al ash-Sheikh
- Succeeded by: Abdullah ibn Muhammad Al ash-Sheikh

Personal details
- Born: 1929 Al-Mujamma
- Died: 24 January 2002 Riyadh
- Education: Umm al-Qura University

Mohammed bin Ibrahim bin Jubair (1929–2002) was a Saudi judge and government minister. He was the chairman of the Majlis ash-Shura (Consultative Assembly) of Saudi Arabia from 1992 to 2002.

He was born in 1929 in Al-Mujamma. In 1953, he got a degree on Islamic law from Umm al-Qura University in Makkah. He served as a judge in Makkah and Riyadh. In 1989, he was appointed Minister of Justice in 1989. In 1992, he was appointed as the chairman of the newly re-constituted Majlis ash-Shura, and he held that position until his death in early 2002. He died on 24 January 2002 in Riyadh.
