= Abdullah ibn Muhammad Al ash-Sheikh =

Saudi Arabian politician (born 1948)

Abdullah ibn Muhammad Al al-Sheikh
- عبد الله بن محمد آل الشيخ
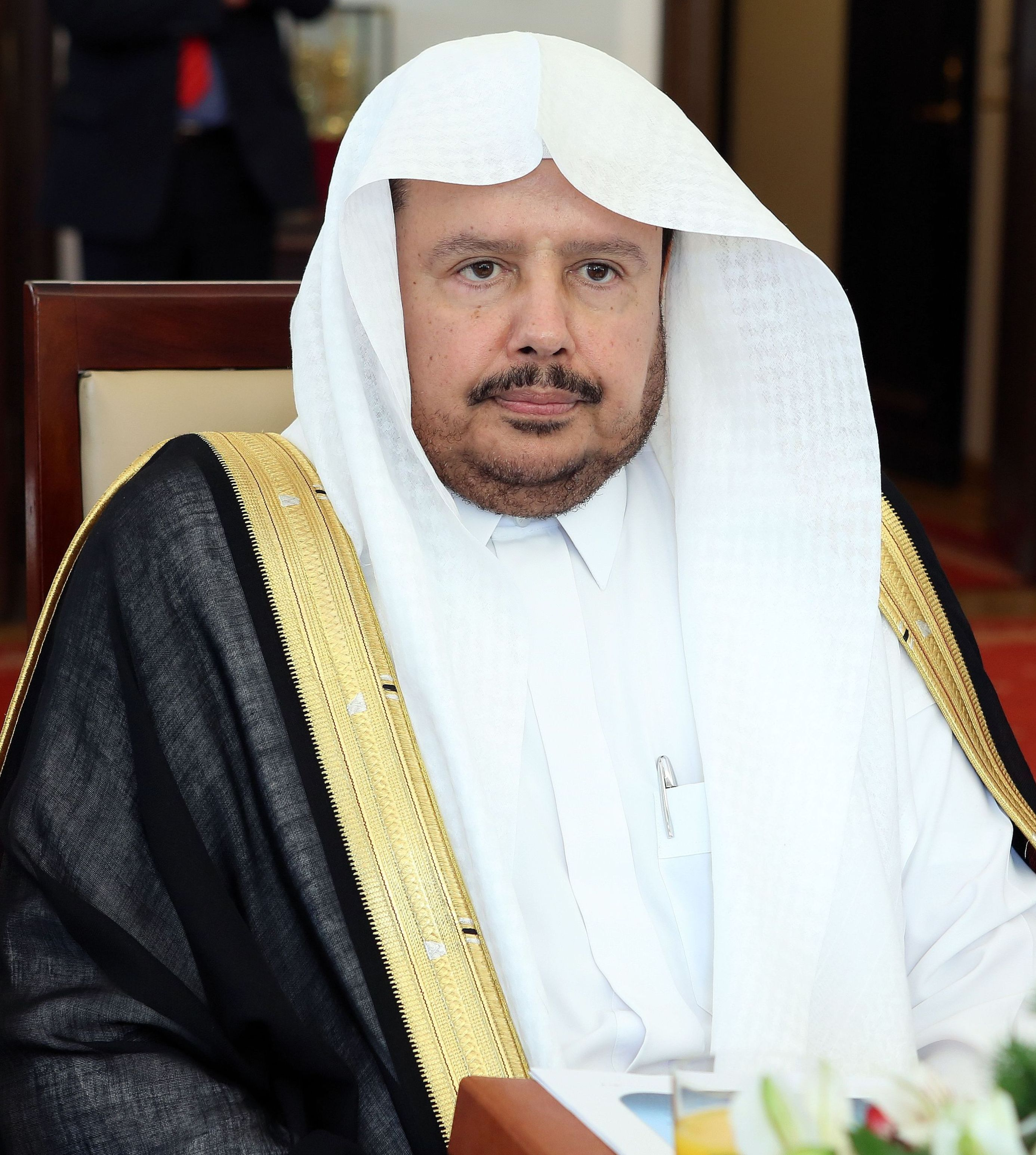
- Al al-Sheikh in 2014

Speaker of the Consultative Assembly
- Incumbent
- Assumed office 15 February 2009
- Prime Minister: King Abdullah; King Salman; Crown Prince Mohammed
- Preceded by: Salih bin Abdullah al Humaid

Minister of Justice President of the Supreme Judicial Council
- In office November 1992 – 14 February 2009
- Prime Minister: King Fahd; King Abdullah
- Preceded by: Mohammed bin Jubair
- Succeeded by: Muhammad bin Abdul Karim Issa

Personal details
- Born: 1948 (age 77–78) Diriyah
- Relatives: Al ash-Sheikh
- Education: Imam Muhammad bin Saud University; Al-Azhar University (PhD)

Abdullah ibn Muhammad Al al-Sheikh (Arabic: عبد الله بن محمد آل الشيخ; born 1948) is a Saudi jurist and politician who has served as Speaker of the Consultative Assembly since 2009. He previously served as the Minister of Justice from February 1992 to February 2009.

== Background and education ==
Abdullah ibn Muhammad Al ash-Sheikh is a member of a noted family of Saudi religious scholars, the Al ash-Sheikh. He was born in Diriyah in 1948 and was educated by his father, Muhammad ibn Ibrahim Al ash-Sheikh former and the first Grand Mufti of Saudi Arabia. He also studied the interpretation of the Quran and jurisprudence principles with the late Sheikh Abdulrazaq Afifi. He attended the Shariah College in Riyadh (later renamed Imam Muhammad Bin Saud Islamic University) and graduated with a bachelor's degree in Sharia in 1975. He then studied Sharia at Al-Azhar University in Cairo and returned to Saudi Arabia to obtain a doctorate degree in 1987. He earned his PhD degree in Fiqh from Imam Mohammed bin Saudi University in 1987.

== Career ==
After obtaining his doctorate, Al ash-Sheikh became a lecturer and professor in the Sharia College of Imam Muhammed bin Saud Islamic University until his appointment as minister of justice. in November 1992. He replaced Mohammed bin Jubair as minister. On the instructions of the King, he drew up the judiciary law of 2007. These reforms envisaged the creation of specialized courts to operate in parallel with the traditional sharia courts, particularly in areas of commercial litigation. In effect, the reform may allow certain cases to be judged without reference to Sharia. Another important aspect of the reform was the creation of a Supreme Court. The laws covering the judicial reforms were passed in October 2007, but implementation was slow.

Al ash-Sheikh announced in July 2008 that he had submitted a plan of action for the judiciary reforms to the King, but little was heard further until it was announced in 2009 that he would cease to be minister of justice in a major cabinet reshuffle. He was replaced by Muhammad bin Abdul Karim Issa as justice minister on 14 February 2009. It was reported that King Abdullah's objective in the reshuffle was to replace conservative incumbents with younger, more progressive candidates. It was also stated that he was one of the conservatives in the cabinet replaced.

Later, he was appointed chairman of the Majlis ash Shura in 2009.

== Other appointments ==
He is a member of Council of Senior Ulema and the Supreme Council for Islamic Affairs.
