= Salih bin Abdullah al-Humaid =

Saudi Islamic scholar (born 1949)

Saleh ibn Abdullah ibn Humayd
- صالح بن عبد الله بن حميد
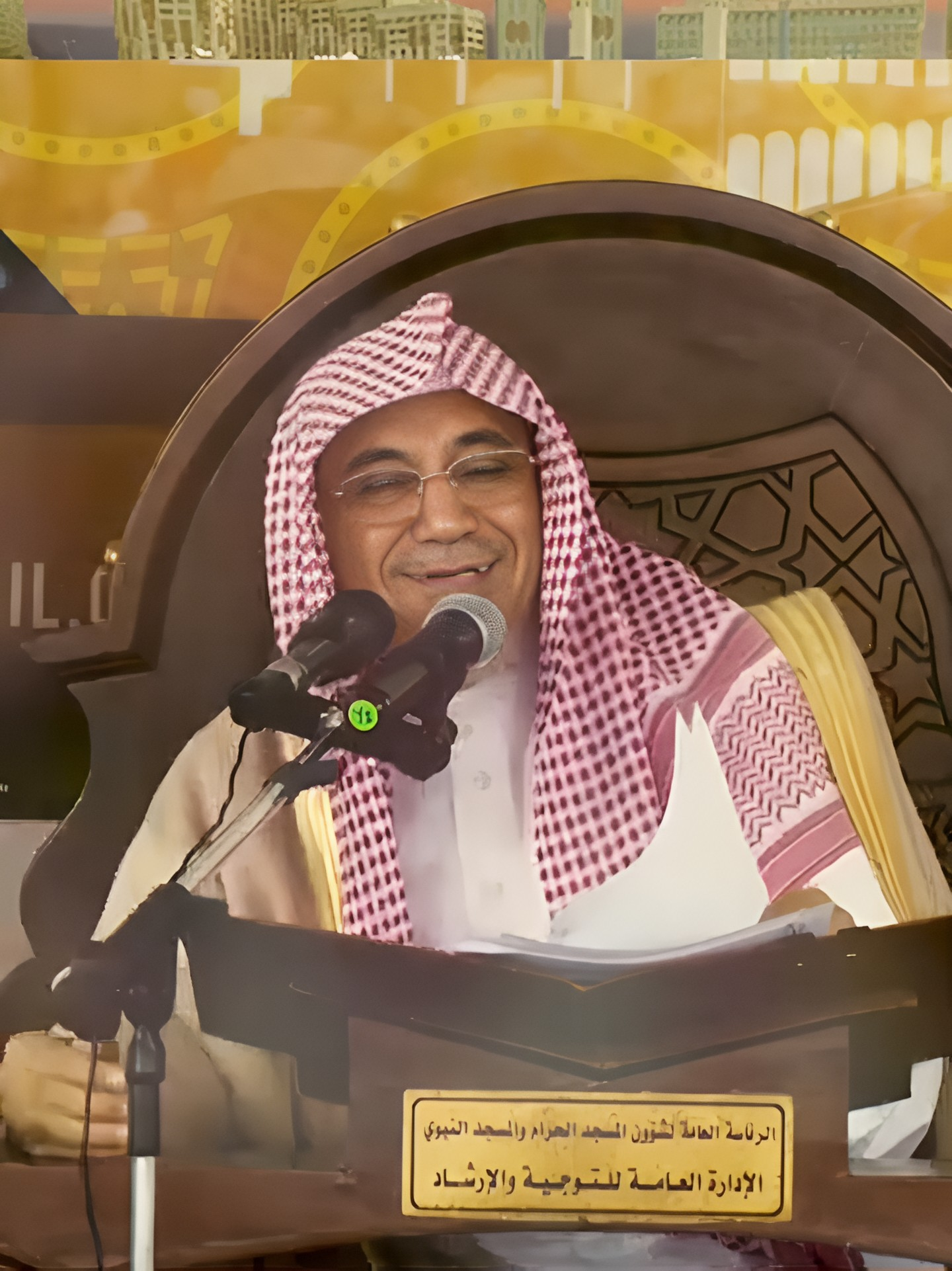

Chairman of the Majlis ash-Shura
- In office 8 February 2002 – 15 February 2009
- Preceded by: Mohammed bin Jubair
- Succeeded by: Abdullah ibn Muhammad Al ash-Sheikh

Personal life
- Born: 1949 Buraidah, Saudi Arabia
- Children: 10
- Parent: Abd Allah ibn Humayd
- Occupation: Imam, khatib, jurist, academic, politician

Religious life
- Religion: Islam
- Denomination: Sunni
- Jurisprudence: Hanbali
- Creed: Athari
- Movement: Salafism

Muslim leader
- Awards: National Order of Merit of Mauritania; King Faisal International Prize for Service to Islam

Ṣāleḥ ibn ʻAbd Allāh al-Ḥumayd (Arabic: صالح ابن عبد الله الحميد; born 1949), is a Saudi Islamic scholar and former judge, who is currently one of the ten Imams of Grand Mosque of Mecca. He has also been a member of the Assembly of Saudi Arabia since 1993 and served as Speaker of the Majlis al-Shura from February 2002 to February 2009.

== Biography ==
Saleh bin Humaid is the son of Abd Allah Ibn Humayd and a member of the Saudi Majlis al-Shura (Consultative Assembly of Saudi Arabia) since 1993 and previously served briefly as the President of Religious Affairs of The Two Holy Mosques from 2001 to 2002 as well as the Speaker of Majlis al Shura from February 2002 to February 2009. He is currently imam of Masjid al-Haram (Grand Mosque of Mecca). He is also the President of the International Islamic Fiqh Academy in Jeddah, and a member of the Arabic Language Academy in Mecca.

He won the 2016 Service to Islam award from the King Faisal International Prize.

He led the Eid al-Fitr prayers every year, succeeding Muhammad al-Subail. In 2025, he excused himself and the Eid al-Fitr prayers was led by al-Sudais.

He delivered the Arafa Sermon in 2025.
