= Makkah Declaration (2019) =

The Makkah Declaration (2019) also known as the Charter of Makkah, is a document that was endorsed on 28 May 2019 in Makkah, Saudi Arabia. Its creation was largely conceived and realized by the Muslim World League and it was presented by Saudi King Salman bin Abdulaziz Al Saud. It was written to create a pan-Islamic set of principles that supported anti-extremism, religious and cultural diversity, and legislation against hate and violence. The document was declared at the end of the four-day conference organized by the Muslim World League conference in Makkah. It was approved by Islamic leaders of 139 countries and signed by around 1,200 prominent Muslim figures.

== Background ==
In August 2016 Muhammad Al-Issa became Secretary General of the Muslim World League. Under Al-Issa’s direction, the MWL has been widely recognized as one of the leading organizations in Saudi Arabia dedicated to combating extremist ideology. As part of this mission, the MWL has worked to build relations with leaders from other faiths, and to build a consensus across the various denominations of Islam rejecting extremism, fundamentalism, and violence.

At a conference organized by the MWL in December 2018, a group of more than 1,000 religious scholars representing 128 countries called for a comprehensive plan to address sectarianism and extremism within Islam, and stressed the need to create effective channels of communication between the different schools of Islam. They resolved to establish a committee to draft a comprehensive charter addressing these issues – at the time referred to as the “Makkah document.”

In April 2019, the MWL and the American Jewish Committee (AJC) signed a memorandum of understanding that committed the two organization to further Muslim-Jewish understanding and cooperate against racism and extremism. Dr. Al-Issa also accepted an invitation to visit Auschwitz to commemorate the 75th anniversary of liberation of those imprisoned at the Nazi concentration camp.

The following month the Muslim World League convened a four day conference in Mecca titled “The Values of Centrism and Moderation in the Quran and Sunnah” to debate and approve the Makkah document. This conference brought together more than 1,200 Muslim leaders, representing 139 countries and 27 Islamic sects, in an attempt to implement all-encompassing changes to Islam. At the end of this conference the attendees unanimously approved the Makkah Declaration, which has served as a reference point for MWL operations ever since.

== Complete text ==
The following is a translation of the original text of the Makkah Declaration prepared by the Muslim World League.

On May 28, 2018, the “Charter of Makkah” was endorsed unanimously by an unprecedented group of the world’s leading Muslim scholars, who gathered in the Holy City for the promotion of moderate Islam.

"The Charter of Makkah" offers Muslims around the world guidance on the principles that speak to the true meaning of Islam.

The Charter of Makkah is orientated around the following principles:

1. All people, regardless of their different ethnicities, races and nationalities, are equal under God.
2. We reject religious and ethnic claims of “preference.”
3. Differences among people in their beliefs, cultures and natures are part of God’s will and wisdom.
4. Religious and cultural diversity never justifies conflict. Humanity needs positive, civilized partnerships and effective interaction. Diversity must be a bridge to dialogue, understanding and cooperation for the benefit of all humanity.
5. God revealed Himself to all mankind and is the origin of all religious belief, and its various messages and methods, when practiced in their true form. We shall not define any religion by the false political practices of those claiming to be adherents.
6. Civilized cultural dialogue is the most effective way to achieve tolerance and understanding, deepen community ties, and overcome obstacles to coexistence. We recognize and respect the other’s legitimate rights and right to existence. We set aside preconceived prejudices, historical animosities, conspiracy theories and erroneous generalizations. Those who were alive when the mistakes of history occurred are the ones responsible for them. No one should be held accountable for the mistakes committed by the other; no one should held accountable for a sin committed by another, irrespective of when in history it occurred.
7. Religions and philosophies are exonerated from the sins committed by their adherents and claimants. These sins reflect the adherents' opinions, not the religions. The role of religious leaders is to call people to worship their Creator and seek His satisfaction by caring for his creations, protecting their dignity, and making positive societal and family contributions.
8. All Muslims should work together to prevent destruction and benefit humanity. We should establish a noble and effective alliance that goes beyond theory and empty slogans, and tackles the root causes of terrorism.
9. We should advance laws to deter the promotion of hatred, the instigation of violence and terrorism, or a clash of civilizations, which foster religious and ethnic disputes.
10. Muslims have enriched human civilization and can further enrich it today through their many contributions to addressing ethical, social and environmental challenges.
11. All individuals must combat terrorism and injustice, and reject exploitation and the violation of human rights. This duty is neither discriminatory nor partial.
12. The planet we enjoy is a gift given to us by God. The pollution and destruction of our natural resources are both a violation of our own rights as well as the rights of generations to come. To protect the right to live in a clean environment, all countries should sign climate treaties, cease polluting the environment, and manage industrial progress in a manner that safeguards mankind now and in future.
13. The clash of civilizations that calls for conflict and the spread of fear between one another are symptoms of isolation and hegemony, caused by racism, cultural dominance and seclusion.
14. These symptoms work together to deepen animosity among nations and peoples, and prevent peaceful coexistence and positive national integration, especially in multi-religious and multi-ethnic countries. Hatred is the raw material of nourishment for the industry of violence and terrorism.
15. The phenomenon of Islamophobia results from an inability to truly understand Islam. True understanding of Islam requires an objective view that is devoid of stereotypical and prejudicial notions, which are often projected by those falsely claiming to be true Muslims.
16. All individuals must promote noble moral values and encourage responsible social practices. They should cooperate in fighting moral, environmental and familial challenges according to concepts shared by Islam and humanity.
17. Personal freedom cannot justify violating human values or destroying social mores. Freedom does not equate chaos. Every freedom must stop before it limits the values and freedoms of others, and should respect the boundaries of constitutional and legal frameworks, while taking into account the public conscience and societal tranquility.
18. Intervention in the internal affairs of countries is a flagrant violation of sovereignty. This includes the practice of political dominance through economic or non-economic means, the promotion of sectarian beliefs and attempts to impose religious edicts (Fatwas) without respect for local circumstances, conditions and social conventions. Regardless of the pretext, intervention can never be justified, except in rendering relief aid, humanitarian support or social development programs, or in answering a legitimate and official request from a prominent public interest to confront aggression or corruption.
19. We should follow the examples of accountable global development efforts that deter all types of corruption, apply the principle of accountability, and change consumption patterns that interfere with development goals, deplete economic capabilities or waste resources.
20. Responsible educational institutions form the social safeguard of Muslim communities. They require effective curricula and teaching tools. The responsibility includes promoting centrism and moderation, especially among youth.
21. All world leaders and international organizations should cooperate effectively to achieve safe coexistence among the religious, ethnic and cultural communities of humanity. No individual should be discriminated against based on his or her religion, ethnicity or otherwise when it comes to political, economic or humanitarian assistance.
22. Global citizenship is a requirement. The principles of Islamic justice dictate respect for all nations, and their constitutions and laws. While citizens must faithfully pledge allegiance to their state, the state has requirements, too. It must ensure security and social peace, protect sanctuaries from desecration, and shield religious symbols from ridicule. These reflect the principle of mutual requirement, with rights for all elements of society, including religious and ethnic minorities.
23. An attack on a site of worship is a criminal act. The world must respond to such attacks with firmness of law, strong political will, and a unified stance against the mindset of terrorism that supports such acts.
24. Programs to combat hunger, poverty, disease, ignorance, racial discrimination and environmental destruction require the solidarity of all responsible institutions. These include governmental, intergovernmental and nongovernmental organizations, and those active in humanitarian service. Each should strive to preserve the dignity of mankind and the human rights of men and women.
25. The empowerment of women should not be undermined by marginalizing their role, disrespecting their dignity, reducing their status, or impeding their opportunities, whether in religious, academic, political or social affairs. Their rights include equality of wages and opportunity.
26. The highest responsibility of states and international organizations is the welfare of children, and their health, education and upbringing. The family also is responsible for development a child’s critical thinking to broaden his or her horizons, nurture abilities and creativity, and develop communicative skills, while safeguarding against deviation.
27. We must enhance the identity of Muslim youth, with its five pillars – religion, country, culture, history, and language – and protect it against exclusion. We must protect youth from the ideas of a clash of civilization, and block efforts to mobilize against those with whom we intellectually disagree. We must combat intellectual extremism along with militancy, violence or terrorism, by helping raise awareness among youth and guiding them according to the Islamic values of tolerance, peace and harmonious coexistence. These values teach comprehension of the other, preservation of the other’s dignity and rights, and observation of the national laws in which one resides.
28. We should establish an International Forum to promote constructive dialogue among youth inside and outside Muslim communities.
29. We should strive beyond resolutions, rhetorical initiatives and programs, and theoretical proclamations to achieve effective and authentic results that advance world peace and security, and fight techniques of annihilation, ethnic cleansing, forced migration, human trafficking and illegitimate abortion.
30. Only learned scholars such as those gathered at this Conference and agreeing to this Charter can speak in the name of the Muslim Ummah, or any matter pertaining to its affairs. We share common religious and human objectives to advance the interests of all. We recognize that this necessitates the participation of all, without exclusion, racism or discrimination against anyone, irrespective of religion, ethnicity or color.

Blessing and peace be upon our Prophet Muhammad, his family and all companions.

== Reception ==
The Makkah Declaration has received endorsement religious leaders representing 27 different doctrines and sects of Islam. Many of the values in the Makkah Declaration are reflected in the recent reforms seen in Saudi Arabia, including the significant expansion of women’s rights, and a more conciliatory attitude towards Israel.

Outside of the Islamic world the Declaration has received praise from western commentators and has been likened to Martin Luther’s 95 Theses.

== Analysis ==
The document called for combating the hate speech, violence, extremism and terrorism. It also appealed to fight injustice, oppression, and the violation of human rights.

=== Attitude towards non-Muslims ===
1. All groups are equal under God.
2. Religious and cultural differences never justify conflict.
3. Everyone should be able to enjoy safe coexistence. No individual should be discriminated against based on his or her religion.
4. Attacking a site of worship is a criminal act.
5. Young Muslims should be taught to reject extremism, militancy, violence, and terrorism against those with whom they disagree.

=== Environmentalism ===
The Declaration alludes to contemporary environmental concerns at the global level. Notably:

1. Explicitly calls for countries to join climate treaties.
2. Calls for environmental pollution to cease.
3. Advocated for the managing of industrial progress to safeguard mankind.
