= Ministry of Justice (Saudi Arabia) =

Government ministry of Saudi Arabia

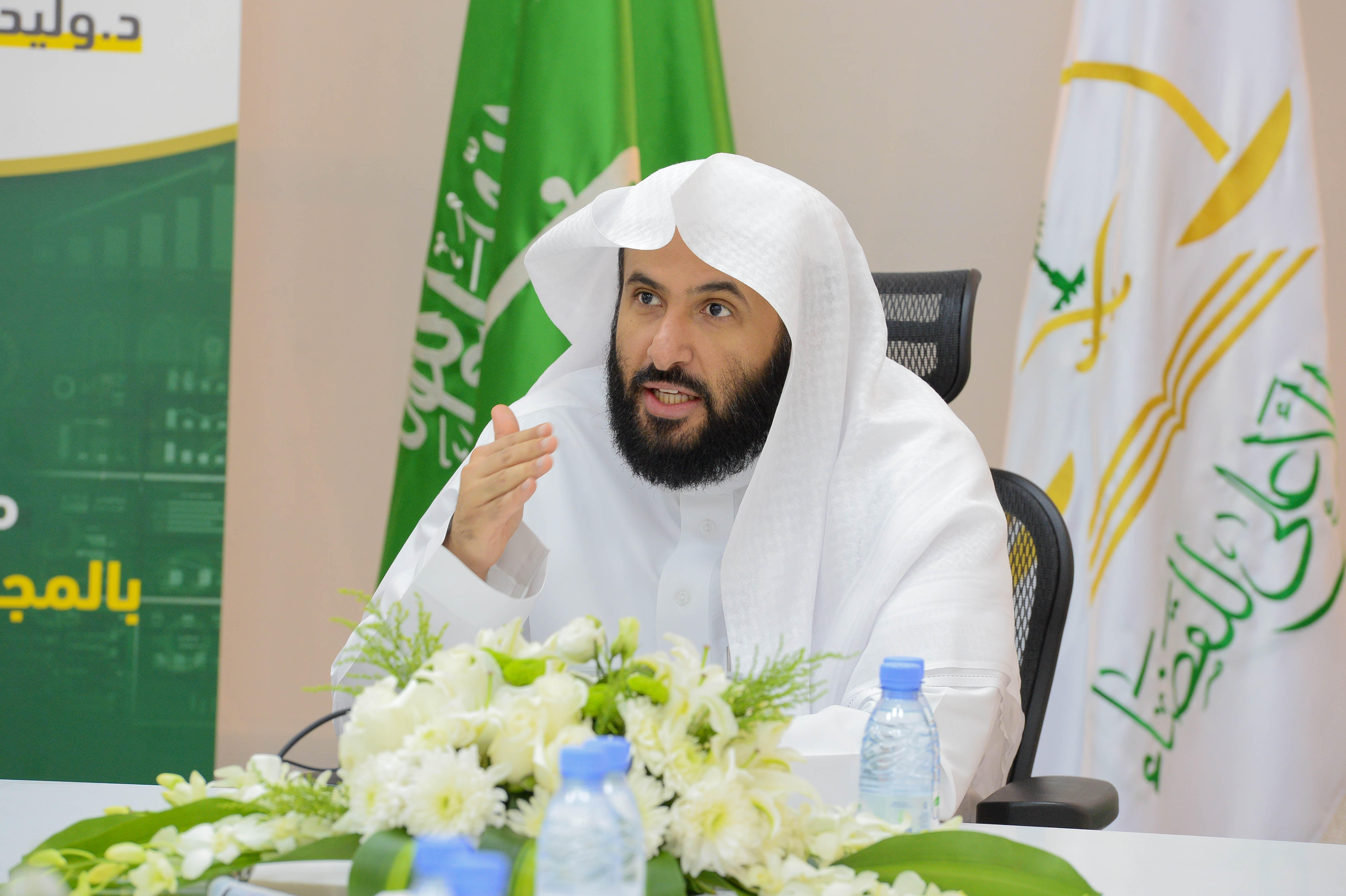
- Walid bin Mohammed Al Samani, current Justice Minister since 2015

Agency overview
- Formed: 1962; 64 years ago
- Jurisdiction: Government of Saudi Arabia
- Headquarters: Riyadh, Saudi Arabia
- Agency executive: Walid Al Samani, Minister
- Website: Official English Site

The Ministry of Justice (MoJ; Arabic: وزارة العدل) is a government agency in Saudi Arabia that was established in 1962 by King Faisal of Saudi Arabia and began operating in 1970.

== History ==
The Ministry of Justice was established by royal decree in 1962 to oversee the courts and meet their financial and administrative needs. However, it did not begin operating until 1970. Its first minister was Mohammed bin Ali al-Harkan, who served until 1975. Over the following years, the administration of Saudi courts was reorganised in accordance with the Judiciary Law of 1975, which established the Supreme Judicial Council as the country's highest judicial authority.

In 2007, Saudi Arabia introduced a new Law of the Judiciary, restructuring the court system and reducing the Ministry of Justice's authority over judicial personnel. The Supreme Judicial Council was given responsibility for judicial appointments, transfers and inspections, while the ministry of Justice retained administrative and financial responsibility for the courts. As part of the implementation of judicial reforms, the ministry inaugurated Saudi Arabia's first specialised labour courts in October 2018. Also that year, women began working in the ministry for the first time, taking up roles in legal research, administration and software development.

According to the World Economic Forum's 2019 Global Competitiveness Report, Saudi Arabia was ranked 16th in the world for judicial independence, an improvement of eight places compared to the previous year. The country also ranked 17th for the efficiency of its legal framework for resolving disputes. In 2019, the ministry unveiled its plans as part of the National Transformation Programme to provide 80% of its services electronically by 2020.

In October 2020, the Minister of Justice oversaw the appointment of 100 women as notaries, due to start work in November.

== Responsibilities ==
The ministry is responsible for overseeing the Saudi Arabian court system and its associated prosecutorial services, as well as meeting their financial and administrative needs. Other responsibilities include appointing judges and providing licenses to attorneys, translators, and legal experts.

== List of ministers ==
- Mohammed bin Ali al Harkan (1970–1975)
- Ibrahim ibn Muhammad Al ash-Sheikh (1975–1990)
- Mohammed bin Ibrahim bin Jubair (1990–1992)
- Abdullah ibn Muhammad Al ash-Sheikh (1992–2009)
- Muhammad bin Abdul Karim Issa (2009–2015)
- Walid bin Mohammed Al Samani (2015–present)

== See also ==
- Ministries of Saudi Arabia
- Politics of Saudi Arabia
