= Ibrahim ibn Muhammad Al ash-Sheikh =

Saudi Arabian politician and scholar (1920–2006)

Ibrahim ibn Muhammad Al al-Sheikh
- إبراهيم بن محمد آل الشيخ

Personal life
- Born: 1920
- Died: 2006 (aged 85–86)
- Known for: Leading Salafi scholar

Religious life
- Religion: Islam
- Denomination: Salafi

Ibrahim ibn Muhammad Al al-Sheikh (Arabic: إبراهيم بن محمد آل الشيخ; 1920–2006) was a leading Salafi scholar in Saudi Arabia and minister of justice between 1975 and 1990.

== Background ==
Ibrahim ibn Muhammad Al ash-Sheikh was born into the noted family of Saudi religious scholars, the Al ash-Sheikh, descendants of Muhammad ibn Abd al-Wahhab, the influential Muslim scholar. He was the eldest son of Muhammad ibn Ibrahim Al ash-Sheikh, Grand Mufti of Saudi Arabia until 1969.

== Career ==
Ibrahim ibn Muhammad was one of the most influential religious leaders in the early 1970s. He maintained a close relationship with King Faisal, with whom he met on a weekly basis. He believed that Saudi Arabia should take a leading role in the Arab world and pushed for Saudi involvement in war with Israel.

Between 1975 and 1990, he served as minister of justice.

== Family ==
His brother Abdullah ibn Muhammad Al ash-Sheikh, a younger son of the late Grand Mufti, also served as minister of justice, from 1993 to 2009. His grandson Turki is a lawyer practicing in London and Riyadh.
