= Hanbalism =

Hanbalism may refer to:

- Hanbali school, one of the four major schools of Islamic jurisprudence
- Atharism, also known as Hanbalism, a school of theology in Sunni Islam
