= Muhammad ibn Ibrahim Al ash-Sheikh =

Grand Mufti of Saudi Arabia (1890–1969)

Grand Mufti of Saudi Arabia
- In office 1953–1969
- Monarchs: King Abdulaziz; King Saud; King Faisal
- Succeeded by: Abd al-Aziz ibn Baz (Position abolished; restored in 1993)

Personal details
- Born: 1890 Riyadh, Emirate of Jabal Shammar (present day Saudi Arabia)
- Died: 3 December 1969 (aged 78–79) Riyadh, Saudi Arabia

Muhammad ibn Ibrahim Al al-Sheikh (1890– 3 December 1969), was a Saudi Arabian religious scholar who served as the first Grand Mufti of Saudi Arabia from 1953 until his death in 1969. He is recognized as being amongst the forefront of Salafi theologians in history.

== Background ==
Muhammad ibn Ibrahim Al al-Sheikh was born in Riyadh in 1890 to the noted family of Saudi religious scholars, the Al ash-Sheikh, descendants of Muhammad ibn Abd al-Wahhab. His father was Sheikh Ibrahim ibn Abdul Latif Al ash-Sheikh, and his mother was Jawharah bint Abdul Aziz Al Hilali. He had a very religious upbringing. He memorized Quran in an early age. He lost his sight around the year 1328 AH, and he knew to read and write before losing sight.

== Uprising of King Faisal ==
As Grand Mufti of Saudi Arabia he gave a fatwa legitimising the takeover of future King Faisal against his brother King Saud.

== Role as Grand Mufti ==
As Grand Mufti of Saudi Arabia from 1953 to 1969, he dominated Saudi religious policy in the 1950s and 1960s. He died in 1969.

== Other roles ==
He served as president of the Constituent Council of the Muslim World League. He was one of the closest advisors of King Faisal having significant effects on the latter's role in the Arab world.

== Family ==
Muhammad was the father of Ibrahim ibn Muhammad Al ash-Sheikh, Saudi minister of justice from 1975 to 1990 and Abdullah ibn Muhammad Al ash-Sheikh, Saudi minister of justice from 1993 to 2009.

He was the first cousin of King Faisal whose mother, Tarfa bin Abdullah, was from the Al Sheikh family.

== Legacy ==
The Dakhna Grand Mosque in Riyadh, when rebuilt in 2005, was renamed after him in his honor as Sheikh Muhammad bin Ibrahim Mosque.

Religious titles
Preceded by None	Grand Mufti of Saudi Arabia; 1953–1969	Succeeded by Abd al-Aziz ibn Abd Allah ibn Baaz
