= Supreme Judicial Council of Saudi Arabia =

Governing body of Saudi Arabian courts

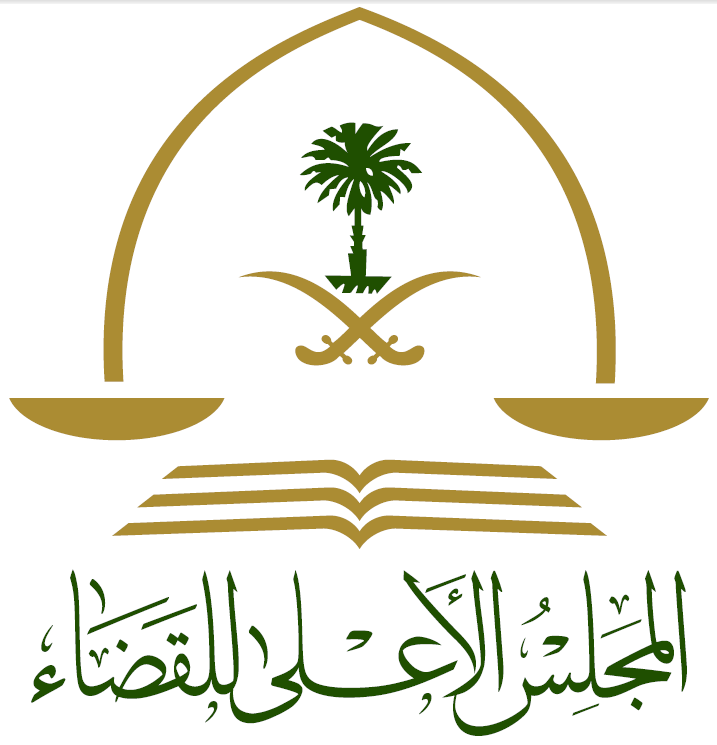

The Supreme Council of Magistracy of Saudi Arabia (Arabic: المجلس الأعلى للقضاء) is a seven-eleven member council appointed by the King in the legal system of the Kingdom of Saudi Arabia. It supervises the lower courts of Saudi Arabia – overseeing judges' performances and new judicial appointments – but also provides "legal opinions, advises the King, and reviews sentences involving death, stoning, or amputation" (according to a 2006 description of it from Washington Law University). The Minister of Justice serves as the chief of the Council.

As of a decree made January 2013, the council will be headed by the justice minister and its members will include the chief justice of the Supreme Court of Saudi Arabia (which was created by later reforms), four Chiefs of the Court of Appeals, the deputy justice minister, chairman of the Bureau of Investigation and Public Prosecution. The term of office for the council members is four years, starting 15 January 2013.

== Members ==
As of a decree of January 2013, its members were

- Mohammed al-Issa (Minister of Justice, president of the Supreme Council of Magistracy)
- Sheikh Ghaihab bin Mohammed Al-Ghaihab (Chief Justice of the Supreme Court)
- Sheikh Shafi Al-Haqbani (Justice of the Court of Appeals)
- Sheikh Mubasher Al-Gharman (Justice of the Court of Appeals)
- Sheikh Saud Al-Muejib (Justice of the Court of Appeals)
- Sheikh Mohammed Mirdad (Justice of the Court of Appeals)
- Sheikh Farhan bin Yahya Al-Faify
- Sheikh Saeed bin Brek Al-Garny
- Sheikh Mohammed bin Abdullah Al-Jarallah
- Sheikh Ibrahim bin Ali Al-Dhale
- Shiekh Abdurahman bin Mohammed Al-Hussain
- Shiekh Nasser bin Hamad Al-Wahaibi.

== Former members ==
- Sheikh Abdullah Al-Yahya (former secretary-general of the council, relieved of his position in January 2013)
- Sheikh Saleh Al Luhaidan (former chief justice of the Council, relieved of his position in February 2009.)

== See also ==
- Legal system of Saudi Arabia
- Judiciary of Saudi Arabia
