= Muslim World League =

Islamic NGO based in Mecca

Logo of the MWL

The Muslim World League (MWL; Arabic: رابطة العالم الإسلامي, romanized: Rābiṭat al-ʿĀlam al-ʾIslāmī) is an international Islamic non-governmental organization based in Mecca, Saudi Arabia that promotes Islam by advancing moderate values. Under the leadership of Secretary-General Dr. Mohammad bin Abdulkarim Sheikh Al-Issa, the MWL has become a prominent institutional voice for interfaith cooperation and rejection of extremism worldwide.

Fox News has described Sheikh Al-Issa as the "leading voice against political, extremist Islam worldwide", while Ilja Sichrovsky, founder of the international Muslim Jewish conference, called his interfaith outreach "incredibly courageous, brave, and praiseworthy".

The MWL funds the construction of mosques, financial reliefs and aid for Muslims and non-Muslims afflicted by natural disasters, the distribution of copies of the Quran, and political tracts on Muslim minority groups. The organisation maintains that they reject all acts of violence and promote dialogue with the people of other cultures, within their understanding of Sharia.

The MWL has received recognition for its work on interfaith dialogue and promotion of moderate Islamic values. Cardinal Jean-Louis Tauran, Former President of the Pontifical Council for Interfaith Dialogue at the Vatican, praised the organisation for its efforts to build bridges between religions, stating he was "fully aware of the relentless efforts exerted" to make the MWL "really reflect the true meaning of its name — a link, not only among Muslims but also with believers of other religions, especially Christians, to achieve common goals." In its 2019 Country Reports on Terrorism, the U.S. State Department stated that the MWL's Secretary General, Sheikh Al-Issa, "pressed a message of interfaith dialogue, religious tolerance, and peaceful coexistence with global religious authorities, including Muslim imams outside the Arab world," as well as conducted extensive outreach to prominent U.S. Jewish and Christian leaders.

MWL holds General Consultative Status with the United Nations Economic and Social Council (ECOSOC), the highest category of NGO recognition, granting it the right to make oral presentations at ECOSOC sessions. The United Nations High Commissioner for Refugees (UNHCR) describes MWL as 'one of the most instrumental international non-governmental Islamic organizations in the world' and maintains a multi-year General Cooperation Agreement with MWL covering joint humanitarian operations in Sudan, Ethiopia, and Nigeria. Teachers College, Columbia University, describes MWL as "the world's largest Islamic non-governmental organization."

MWL also founded the International Islamic Relief Organization in 1978.

== History ==
The MWL was founded in accordance with a resolution adopted during the meeting of the General Islamic Conference which was held in Makkah on the 14th of Dhul Hijjah 1381 Hijra, corresponding to 18 May 1962. The founding meeting of 22 Muslim religious leaders in 1962 was held under the patronage of then Crown Prince Faisal.

The MWL has had eight Secretaries General since its founding. Under Secretary General Sheikh Al-Issa, the MWL has focused on building inter-faith and intra-faith peace, harmony, and coexistence through dialogue.

MWL is included in the UN Economic and Social Council list of international non-governmental organizations holding a consultative status.

== Objectives ==
The MWL's stated mission is to introduce Islam and the moderate values presented in the Quran and Sunnah. Further, the organization also states that it seeks to spread a message of "peace and harmony" that strengthens Islam's resolve and unity around the world. The organization also says it combats extremist ideology by promoting and clarifying facts through education, traditional and digital media, social media, and international conferences.

MWL claims to not only defend the rights of Muslim minorities, but all minorities that face discrimination and covert forms of oppression. The Washington Times quoted the MWL's Secretary General saying that the organization "embraces the full range of Muslim beliefs and seeks to downplay sectarian divides – including that between Sunni and Shiite Muslims." In regards to protecting the rights of minorities outside of Islam, MWL's leadership wrote in a 2019 Newsweek opinion editorial piece that the Charter of Makkah "demands that we preserve the human rights of all people, including women and minorities."

According to the MWL's website, the organization prioritizes civilizational rapprochement through constructive dialogue and engagement. In 2018, Sheikh Al-Issa stated that Muslims and non-Muslims alike have an obligation to call for civilizational rapprochement that promotes and shares values and common interests, "in addition to the advancement of the concept of human brotherhood that calls for reinforcing the feeling of love, cooperation and understanding." Additionally, the organization also states that it promotes peaceful and harmonious coexistence between Islam and the world's largest religions, especially, but not limited to, Christianity and Judaism.

Each year, the MWL utilizes the Hajj season to gather Islamic voices, scholars, and leaders in Mecca, Saudi Arabia to exchange views and discuss how to best raise the standards and promote true moderate Islamic principles around the world.

=== Charter of Makkah ===
In 2019, the MWL convened the conference that adopted the Charter of Makkah, an agreement that aims to provide Muslims with the true, moderate, and inclusive principles of Islam.

The Charter, signed during a gathering of more than 1,200 Islamic scholars, Imams, and leaders from 139 countries, consists of 30 principle points that call for the world to combat extremism and hatred, fight against injustice and oppression, and reject violations of human rights in all its forms. The Charter strives to articulate the need for equality, religious harmony and tolerance, women empowerment, and coexistence.

=== Founding charter ===
We, the members of the MWL, representing it religiously, hereby undertake before God, Almighty to:

- Discharge our obligation towards God, by conveying and proclaiming His Message all over the world. We also reaffirm our belief that there shall be no peace in the world without the application of the principles of Islam.
- Invite all communities to vie with one another for the common good and happiness of mankind, establish social justice and a better human society.
- Call upon God to bear witness that we do not intend to undermine, dominate or practice hegemony over anyone else.

Hence, in order to further these goals, we intend to:

- Unite the ranks of the Muslims, and remove all divisive forces from the midst of the Muslim communities around the world.
- Remove obstacles in the way of establishing the Muslim world union.
- Support all advocates of charitable deeds.
- Utilize our spiritual as well as material and moral potentialities in furthering the aims of this charter.
- Unify efforts in order to achieve these purposes in a positive and practical way.
- Reject all the pre-tenses of ancient as well as contemporary Jahiliah (attitudes of the pre-Islamic era).
- Always reaffirm the fact that Islam has no place for either regionalism or racism.

=== Jurisdiction ===
- Laying down plans designed to revive the role of the Mosque in the fields of guidance, education, preaching and provision of social services.
- Publishing the ‘Message of the Mosque’ periodical, which deals with finding ways and means of raising the standard of the cultural as well as technical efficiency of the Imams and the Khateebs.
- Publishing Islamic books and pamphlets.
- Conducting a comprehensive survey of the world's Mosques and publishing the information gathered in book form and in the shape of periodical bulletins.
- Selecting and posting groups of well qualified preachers on guidance missions throughout the Mosques of the world.
- Organizing local or regional refresher courses to enrich the culture of the Imams and the Khateebs and to raise the standard of their efficiency.
- Formation of board of directors to supervise the affairs of each and every Mosque at the national as well as the regional levels.
- Studying the ideas and patterns of behavior that contravene the teachings of Islam.
- Helping in rehabilitating and training Imams and Khateebs for posting to the various Muslim areas to lead Muslims in prayers, deliver sermons and guidance lessons.

== Structure ==
=== Office of the Secretary General ===
The Office of the Secretary General of the MWL is the executive wing of the organization. It supervises the day-to-day activities of the MWL and implements the policies and resolutions adopted by the Constituent Council. The office includes the Secretary General, assistant secretaries, and the general staff. The Secretariat's headquarters is located in Makkah, Saudi Arabia.

Muhammad Sheikh Al-Issa is the current secretary general of the MWL.

=== Subsidiary bodies ===
The MWL is organized into six subsidiary bodies under the oversight of the Secretary General:

1. The Supreme Council: Composed of sixty Muslim scholars, the Constituent Council is the highest authority within the MWL. The Constituent Council makes policy recommendations to the Secretary General. It includes representatives from various sects of Islam.
2. The World Supreme Council for Mosques: The World Supreme Council for Mosques (WSCM) seeks to provide resources and protection for mosques around the world.The WSCM has an independent legal personality. It aims at reactivating the mission of the Mosque as a vital focal point of the religious as well as the temporal life of Muslims. Ultimately, the WSCM aims at restoring the Mosque's role to what it was during the early days of Islam. It also strives to protect Mosques and Islamic trusts against assault, and to maintain the sanctity and purity of the Mosque. The WSCM was founded in compliance with a resolution adopted by the "Message of the Mosque" conference, which was held in Holy Makkah during the month of Ramadan 1395 (September 1975) under the auspices of the MWL.
3. The Islamic Fiqh Council :Fiqh is Islamic jurisprudence, seeking solutions to the problems for which the Qur’an does not give clear instructions. Within the MWL, the Islamic Fiqh Council composed of a select group of Muslim jurists and scholars who consider the issues concerning the Muslim Ummah.
4. The International Organization for Relief, Welfare and Development: The International Organization for Relief, Welfare, and Development is among the most active organizations within the MWL. Founded in 1978 in Saudi Arabia as the International Islamic Relief Organization, it provides aid to Muslim and non-Muslim communities in need around the world. In 2019, the International Organization for Relief, Welfare and Development completed the League Boreholes Project in Ghana to provide clean drinking water to several communities. The organization has sponsored several health centers in Africa, including surgery centers in Nigeria, Senegal, Ghana, Burundi, and Zimbabwe. These centers provide cataract surgery free of charge to elderly patients. Additionally, the organization has sponsored several orphanages, providing educational materials, clothing, and security to vulnerable children in Pakistan, Ghana, and elsewhere.
5. The International Organization for the Quran and Sunnah: The International Organization for the Quran and Sunnah is dedicated to assisting scholars in teaching and memorizing the Quran. The MWL's International Organization for the Quran and Sunnah strives to ensure the values of true Islam permeate the work and teachings of Muslim scholars around the world.
6. The World Organization of Muslim Scholars: The World Organization of Muslim Scholars was founded in 2003 as a resolution of the Fourth General Islamic Conference. The organization serves to coordinate the positions of Muslim scholars and intellectuals as they address the emerging challenges facing Muslim communities around the world.

=== Interfaith dialogue, bridge-building, and reform under Sheikh Al-Issa (2016–present) ===
Following the appointment of Sheikh Al-Issa as Secretary General in 2016, MWL has expanded its interfaith dialogue and counter-extremism work. The peer-reviewed Politics and Religion Journal characterizes MWL during this period as 'a nominally non-governmental Islamic organisation' engaged in substantive interfaith outreach.

In January 2020, Sheikh Al-Issa led a delegation of 62 Muslim leaders from 28 countries to the Auschwitz-Birkenau concentration camp. The delegation was described by the Associated Press as 'the most senior Islamic leadership delegation' to visit a Nazi death camp. The visit was also covered by the Times of Israel, which noted its significance as an initiative involving senior religious figures from across the Muslim world.

In the same month, MWL and the American Jewish Committee (AJC) signed a formal Memorandum of Understanding to combat antisemitism and Islamophobia and deepen Muslim-Jewish ties. The AJC described the partnership as a commitment to 'combat hate and deepen ties.'

In 2022, MWL provided funding to establish the International Interfaith Research Lab at Teachers College, Columbia University. The launch included participation by Cardinal Timothy Dolan and Rabbi Arthur Schneier.

The Washington Institute for Near East Policy documented MWL's post-2016 pivot in a 2019 policy paper, concluding that MWL had been directed toward 'moderate Islam' and that US government engagement with MWL was advisable. The U.S. Department of State's 2019 Country Reports on Terrorism cited Sheikh Al-Issa specifically for pressing 'a message of interfaith dialogue, religious tolerance, and peaceful coexistence with global religious authorities.'

Dr. Sheikh Al-Issa was presented the Bridge Builder Award in 2021 for his efforts to promote understanding between people and communities globally.

== Activities ==
Under Secretary General Sheikh Al-Issa, the MWL frequently participates in and hosts international events, in addition to playing an active role in humanitarian aid projects around the world.

=== Averroes event in Córdoba (2026) ===
In November 2026, the Muslim World League co-organised an international event in Córdoba, Spain, with the United Nations Alliance of Civilizations (UNAOC) and Espacio Tierra Creativa, titled "International Year of Ibn Rushd/Averroes: An Opportunity for Reason". Held on 10 November at the Palacio de Congresos de Córdoba, the event marked 900 years since the birth of the Córdoba-born philosopher Averroes (Ibn Rushd) and was co-presided by MWL Secretary-General Sheikh Al-Issa, and UNAOC High Representative Miguel Ángel Moratinos.

According to Arab News, the MWL called the event the first of its kind since the end of Muslim rule in Al-Andalus, and said it had chosen Averroes because of the recognition his work commanded across cultures.

The event was supported by UNESCO, the Regional Government of Andalusia, the Provincial Council of Córdoba and Córdoba City Council, and attended by the Mayor of Córdoba, José María Bellido.

As part of the event, an MWL delegation led by Sheikh Al-Issa also visited the Mosque–Cathedral of Córdoba, where they met Bishop of Córdoba Jesús Fernández González, and the cathedral's dean, Joaquín Alberto Nieva García.

=== G20 Interfaith Forum (2026) ===
In October 2026, the MWL's Secretary-General, Mohammad bin Abdulkarim Al-Issa, was guest of honour at the G20 Interfaith Forum (IF20) in Salt Lake City, Utah, the first time the annual forum had been held in the United States. Delivering the opening keynote address at the Tabernacle on Temple Square on 15 October, he called on faith communities to advance peace, mutual understanding and human dignity, and said that differences between people "should not be a threat, nor an incitement to clash and conflict". He also denounced hate speech as a path towards exclusion and violence.

=== Visit to Belgium ===
In early October 2026, a Muslim World League (MWL) delegation led by Secretary-General Sheikh Al-Issa visited Brussels, where it met Belgian federal officials, European Parliament representatives and leaders of Belgium's Muslim community. According to the Saudi Press Agency, the delegation was received by Peter De Roover, President of the Belgian Chamber of Representatives, at the federal parliament. Discussions covered dialogue as a peaceful means of addressing cross-border international crises and the role of religious institutions in defusing conflicts before they erupt.

During the visit, the MWL delegation also met Belgian Interior Minister Bernard Quintin for discussions on religious, intellectual and security issues.

It also met European Parliament officials to discuss cooperation on implementing Article 17 of the Treaty on the Functioning of the European Union, the provision under which EU institutions maintain regular dialogue with churches and religious and non-confessional organisations.

The Belgian Ministry of Foreign Affairs hosted a dialogue with the MWL at the Egmont Palace under the theme "The Importance of Dialogue in a Changing World". It was attended by ministers, parliamentarians, representatives of European governments, religious leaders, and representatives of international organizations, universities and civil society. The delegation was received by Deputy Prime Minister and Minister of Foreign Affairs Maxime Prévot.

In an interview with Euronews during the visit, the MWL Secretary-General described dialogue as essential to resolving conflicts and said he was not concerned by the rise of the hard right in some European countries, citing national constitutions, constitutional courts and societal values.

The MWL delegation also met leaders and figures of Belgium's Muslim community and invited them to take part in the MWL's Islamic and interfaith forums.

=== AI for Everyone Initiative ===
In September 2026, the MWL held an event in New York during the high-level week of the 81st session of the United Nations General Assembly. The event, titled "AI for Everyone: Faith, Human Dignity and Artificial Intelligence", was organized with the support and participation of the United Nations. The United Nations Alliance of Civilizations (UNAOC) described it as an MWL side event titled "AI for Everyone: Advancing Access and Opportunity in the Age of AI".

Participants included MWL Secretary-General Sheikh Al-Issa; Miguel Ángel Moratinos, UN Under-Secretary-General and High Representative for the UNAOC; and Ismail Ould Cheikh Ahmed, Secretary-General of the Organization of Islamic Cooperation.

Discussions centered on the importance of diverse international, religious and civilizational perspectives in AI ethics, with initial attention to AI-generated content that promotes hatred, violence or conflict between civilizations for ideological or religious motives. In his remarks, Moratinos warned that AI was advancing faster than existing institutions and safeguards, and argued that "AI for Everyone" should mean technology that benefits, and is accountable to, all people.

At the event, the MWL announced plans to establish an AI laboratory with technology companies to develop programs for religious, educational and humanitarian institutions, and to digitize a number of Islamic and Arabic sources and make them available to AI companies while respecting intellectual property rights. It also announced plans to set up a unit to monitor and correct errors in translations of Islamic texts, which the MWL said had given rise to serious misconceptions.

=== Somalia Visit ===
In September 2026, an MWL delegation led by Sheikh Al-Issa visited Somalia, holding meetings with government officials and religious scholars in Mogadishu. Dawan Africa described it as the Secretary-General's first visit to the country. The delegation was received by Mukhtar Robow, Somalia's Minister of Endowments and Islamic Affairs, and by Mohamed Amin Sheikh Osman, Somalia's ambassador to Saudi Arabia.

During the visit, MWL took part in the forum "Somalia at the Heart of the Islamic World", along with members of the Somali Council of Scholars and other religious figures. The event focused on the role of religious scholars in countering extremist ideologies that participants described as contrary to the traditions and values of Somali society.

The delegation also met Somali President Hassan Sheikh Mohamud at the presidential palace in Mogadishu. MWL said the talks covered the League's religious, intellectual and humanitarian contributions in Somalia. According to Arab News, the president commended the MWL's support for the Somali people.

=== MWL delegation to Afghanistan ===
In July 2025, Secretary General Sheikh Al-Issa led an MWL delegation to Kabul, Afghanistan, where he met with senior government officials including Prime Minister Mullah Mohammad Hasan Akhund, Deputy Prime Minister Abdul Salam Hanafi, Foreign Minister Amir Khan Muttaqi, and Interior Minister Sirajuddin Haqqani.

The visit followed the MWL's January 2025 International Summit on Girls' Education in Islamabad, which produced the Islamabad Declaration; a statement by Muslim scholars framing girls' education as consistent with Sharia principles. During meetings, Sheikh Al-Issa referenced the Charter of Makkah and the Charter of Building Bridges Between Islamic Schools of Thought and Sects as frameworks for dialogue. Afghan officials noted MWL’s inclusive approach and its unifying platform for scholars from all Islamic sects.

=== International conference on girls' education in Muslim Communities: challenges and opportunities ===
In January 2025, the MWL conducted an international conference to support the education of girls in Muslim communities.

Conducted under the patronage and in the presence of the Prime Minister of Pakistan, Muhammad Shehbaz Sharif, and in collaboration with the OIC, the conference focused on building a consensus among religious scholars from various Islamic schools of thought and sects regarding the right to education for Muslim girls.

The two-day conference gathered several ministers from OIC states, ambassadors, religious scholars and muftis, representatives from global organizations including UNESCO, UNICEF, and the World Bank in debate and discussion focused on promoting girls’ education across the Muslim world.

The event was also attended by Nobel Laureate Malala Yousafzai, who travelled to Pakistan to support the coalition of traditional Muslim faith leadership, civil and humanitarian agencies, and human rights associations.

The conference culminated in the signing of the Islamabad Declaration, which endorses the right to education for all Muslim girls. This declaration has been endorsed by senior muftis, leading scholars, their jurisprudential councils, representatives of Islamic bodies and councils, academic institutions, governmental and non-governmental international organizations and prominent global activists.

=== International conference on faith in a changing world ===
In October 2024, the MWL convened an international conference titled Faith in a Changing World under the patronage of the King of Morocco, Mohammed VI.

The conference explored the significance of faith, the challenges posed by atheism, and deliberated strategies for engagement. The gathering was attended by various religious, and civil society leaders. It concluded with issuance of the "Charter of Faith in a Changing World," which emphasizes that religious and intellectual beliefs vary in their understanding of believing in God, but there was, however, a consensus to collaborate in confronting nihilistic and atheistic ideologies.

=== International conference of religious leaders promoting interfaith harmony among followers of religions ===
In May 2024, MWL collaborated with Prime Minister of Malaysia Anwar Ibrahim to host religious leaders in Kuala Lumpur. Titled Promoting Interfaith Harmony among Followers of Religions, the gathering brought together about 2,000 religious and intellectual figures from 57 countries. The event discussed various themes, including pluralism, tolerance, moderation, education, building bridges, and inclusive commonalities.

It also discussed the importance of religion in promoting world peace, consolidating solidarity among peoples, and exploring ways of civilizational cooperation, in addition to launching initiatives emanating from the Charter of Makkah as well as highlighting noble religious values.

=== The global conference for building bridges between Islamic schools of thought and sects ===
In March 2024, the MWL organized a conference in Makkah aimed at enhancing understanding and unity among different Islamic schools of thought and sects.

Scholars and muftis from various schools of Islamic thought emphasized the importance of overcoming the tragedies caused by sectarianism and its tendency to deviate from Islam's true guidance. The conference also discussed the narratives, slogans, and behaviours within the sects that fostered extremism and suggested ways to do away with those ideals.

The conference issued the Charter of Building Bridges between Islamic Schools of Thought and Sects in which the scholars emphasized the need for unity among Muslims and the duty to remember the concept of one nation. The charter also recognized the need for unity and working together towards common interests.

=== The role of media in inciting hatred and violence ===
In November 2023, the MWL convened a Media International Forum in Jeddah to discuss The Role of Media in Inciting Hatred and Violence: Risks of Misinformation and Bias.

The event was attended by Palestine President Mahmoud Abbas via a telephonic conversation with the MWL secretary general.

The forum issued the 'Jeddah Charter for Media Responsibility' that was adopted by delegations from over 80 countries, represented by senior religious leaders, media figures, and diplomats. The charter calls for a sense of responsibility and ethics in media discourse with a particular focus on curbing the abuse of religious beliefs and sanctities.

=== Building Bridges of Understanding and Peace Between East and West initiative ===
In June 2023, MWL organized the “Building Bridges of Understanding and Peace Between East and West” initiative at the United Nations Headquarters, New York.

The session featured speeches from global and religious leaders, including Csaba Korosi, Amina Mohammed, Arthur C Wilson, Martin Luther King III, and Sir Ephraim Yitzchak Mirvis, stressing the urgent need for interreligious and intercultural dialogue for the shared goal of global peace and prosperity.

=== R20 Summit 2022 ===
In November 2022, MWL worked with Joko Widodo, President of Indonesia, and Yahya Cholil Staquf, General Chairman of Nahdlatul Ulama (Indonesian Ulema Council) to convene an inaugural gathering of religious leaders in Bali, Indonesia.

Founded by the MWL and the Nahdlatul Ulama, the R20 platform was adopted as the first official engagement group on religion in the G20, making the R20 Summit the first religious gathering of its kind. The two-day event brought together more than 400 participants, including 160 inter-religious figures from 20 of the world's largest economies, to discuss contemporary global challenges and the role religious leaders needed to play to address them.

=== Forum on Common Values among Religious Followers ===
MWL arranged a discussion and debate forum in Riyadh in May 2022 titled "Forum on Common Values among Religious Followers" that brought together senior Muslim scholars and leaders as well as leadership and scholars of other religions from across the world.

The forum brought leadership and followers of various religions together to discuss, appreciate and promote values that bind all religions. Combining common religious principles and international conventions, the forum issued a declaration of “Common Human Values” wherein participants agreed to affirm the centrality of religion in every civilization due to its influence in “shaping the ideas of human societies”.

The participants denounced the idea of an 'inevitable clash of civilizations' due to religious issues. The forum underscored that attempts to gain religious, cultural, political and economic advantages without respect for rights or ethics, and through forms of extremism, arrogance and racism, must be opposed. Through the forum, the religious leaders agreed that it was uncalled for to link religion and malpractices of some of its followers, and that religion must not be employed for worldly purposes.

The gathering announced new initiatives including a project to create The Encyclopedia of Common Human Values and the global “Religious Diplomacy Forum for Building Bridges,” tasked with bridging beyond dialogue relationships among diverse religions and cultures of the world.

=== Conference on the Declaration of Peace in Afghanistan ===
In June 2021, the MWL held a meeting of religious and political leadership from Afghanistan and Pakistan in the holy city of Makkah to discuss peace in Afghanistan.

The conference led to the signing of an accord that defined religious parameters for a peace and reconciliation process in Afghanistan in line with Islamic principles.

Noor-ul-Haq Qadri, then federal Minister for Religious Affairs and Inter-faith Harmony in Pakistan, and Mohammad Qasim Halimi, then minister of Hajj and Religious Affairs of Afghanistan, signed the agreement.

=== Commemorating the 75th anniversary of the liberation of auschwitz ===
In January 2020, Sheikh Al-Issa became the most senior Muslim leader to visit the German Nazi concentration and extermination camp. Leading up to the anniversary, al-Isa published an opinion editorial in The Washington Post, "Why Muslims around the world should remember the Holocaust", decrying the practice of Holocaust denial.

As part of this visit, Sheikh Al-Issa lit candles before the Death Wall at Auschwitz I and the International Monument at Auschwitz II-Birkenau. He also visited the POLIN Museum of the History of Polish Jews and the Nozyk Synagogue, the only surviving prewar Jewish house of prayer in Warsaw. In an article published by the American Jewish Committee, Sheikh Al-Issa stated on his visit to Auschwitz, "To be here, among the children of Holocaust survivors and members of the Jewish and Islamic communities, is both a sacred duty and a profound honor. The unconscionable crimes to which we bear witness today are truly crimes against humanity."

=== International conferences ===
==== Scandinavia symposiums ====
In November 2019, MWL partnered with the Scandinavian Council for Relations, a non-profit organization dedicated to promoting interreligious dialogue and diversity in Scandinavia. Together, the MWL and Scandinavian Council for Relations hosted three symposiums in Copenhagen, Denmark; Oslo, Norway; and Stockholm, Sweden to address global issues like national identify, intellectual security, human brotherhood and human trafficking.

==== The Paris International Conference for Peace and Solidarity ====
In September 2019, MWL joined the Foundation for Islam in France to host the Paris International Conference for Peace and Solidarity. The symposium concluded with a Memorandum of Understanding and Friendship between leaders of the Abrahamic religions in France. The memorandum was signed by Mr. Haim Korsia, Chief Rabbi of France; Mr. François Clavairoly, President of the Council of Christian Churches in France; Monsignor Emmanuel Adamakis, President of the Assembly of Orthodox Bishops of France; and al-Isa. The witnesses of the agreement included Moché Lewin, vice-president of the Conference of European Rabbis; Father Vincent Feroldi, Director of the National Service for Relations with Muslims of the Conference of Bishops of France; and Ghaleb Bencheikh, President of the Foundation of Islam in France.

==== Responsible Leaders Summit ====
In May 2019, the Centre for Responsible Leadership, a partnership between the MWL and the World Council for Religious Leaders hosted the inaugural Responsible Leaders Summit at the United Nations. Leaders from business, finance, religion, politics, media, and the environment participated in high-level workshops to discuss global challenges and their solutions.

The five solution sessions addressed: Restoring Civility to Public Discourse; Economic Inequality; Safeguarding Our Planet; Uniting the Faithful; and Ensuring Gender Equality. The day-long symposium concluded with an awards ceremony, presenting the 2019 Responsible Leadership Awards to: Ann Curry for Truth in Media; Alex Gorsky for Engaged Leadership; Christian Rynning-Tønnesen for Excellence in Sustainability; and Rabbi Arthur Schneier for A Lifetime of Achievement.

=== The General Islamic Conference ===
The General Islamic Conference (GIC) is the highest policy making body that expresses the feelings and aspirations of Muslim peoples around the world. It is the source of the MWL's legitimacy and capacity as the spokesman of Muslims worldwide. The GIC consists of Islamic preachers and activists who meet annually to review major issues facing Islam and Muslims and to find appropriate solutions for the realization of Muslim interests and aspirations.

The GIC has met on several occasions so far as follows:

- The GIC held its first meeting in the year 1381 Hijra (1962), and passed the resolution to establish the MWL.
- The GIC held its second meeting in the year 1381 Hijra (1965), and issued recommendations supporting the idea of the Islamic solidarity, removing from its path, obstacles such as lack of commitment to religious commandments, sectarian prejudice, and conflict of regional interests, foreign influence and alien thought.
- The GIC held its third meeting in the year 1408 Hijra (1987) and adopted a significant recommendation on the need to believe in the sacredness of the two Holy Mosques, glorify Holy Makkah, the sacred months, Hajj rituals and the responsibility of the Muslim ruler of the two Holy Mosques to ensure their security.
- The GIC held its fourth meeting in the year 1423 Hijra (2002) and passed resolutions concerning the Ummah (worldwide Islamic community), Da’wa (Islamic propagation), globalization and other issues concerning Muslims. It also issued the Makkah charter for Islamic action, a statement on Palestine and a decision to for a higher body for coordination and an international forum for Muslim scholars and intellectuals.

In 1974, MWL declared that Ahmadis and related groups are out of the fold of Islam, banned from the Holy lands and should be boycotted socially, economically and culturally.

In 2015, Abd Allah al-Turki spoke on behalf of the speakers at the conference and commenting on the violence caused by Islamic State of Iraq and the Levant, he said: "The terrorism that we face within the Muslim Ummah and our own homelands today … is religiously motivated. It has been founded on extremism, and the misconception of some distorted Sharia concept."

=== Aid for stranded Pakistanis ===
In 1988, MWL (together with Al Falah and Heed International) came forward and established pucca (permanent) houses for the Stranded Pakistanis in Bangladesh.

=== Publications ===
MWL publishes the monthly Journal of the Muslim World League in Arabic and English. It also publishes a weekly News of the Muslim World.

== International affiliations ==
- The United Nations Organization: Observer in General Consultative Status with the ECOSOC. With the MWL's General Consultative Status, the highest level granted, the organization has the authority to make substantive oral presentations during Council meetings.
- Organization of Islamic Cooperation: MWL holds observer status in OIC for all meetings and conferences.
- Islamic World Educational, Scientific and Cultural Organization (ICESCO): MWL signed an agreement of cooperation and partnership with ICESCO in 2019.
- UNICEF: Member
- UNHCR: The MWL contributed one million dollars to the UNHCR in 2019 to support refugees worldwide.
