= List of critics of Islam =

Criticism of Islam has existed since its formative stages. Early written disapproval came from Jews and Christians, before the ninth century, many of whom viewed Islam as a radical Christian heresy, as well as by some former Muslim atheists and agnostics, such as Ibn al-Rawandi. The September 11 attacks and other terrorist attacks in the early 21st century, reignited suspicion and criticism of all of Islam, with calls for moderates to condemn the terrorism of the fundamentalists and help prevent radicalisation and Islamophobia.

Objects of criticism include the morality and authenticity of the Quran and the Hadiths, along with the life of Muhammad, both in his public and personal life. Other criticism concerns many aspects of human rights in the Islamic world (in both historical and present-day societies), including slavery, treatment of women, LGBT groups, and religious and ethnic minorities in Islamic law and practice. The issues when debating and questioning Islam are incredibly complex with each side having a different view on the morality, meaning, interpretation, and authenticity of each topic.

== Middle Ages ==
- John of Damascus, a Syrian monk and presbyter.
- Persian scholar Ibn al-Rawandi (827–911 CE) started out as a Mu'tazilite Muslim, but later he repudiated Islam and revealed religion in general, rejecting the authority of any scriptural or revealed religion, pointing out specific Muslim traditions and trying to show that they are laughable.
- Persian polymath Abu Bakr al-Razi (c. 865–925 CE) is said to have been heavily critical of the institution of prophethood, the belief in miracles and the practice of obedience to religious authorities as against reason. However, according to Peter Adamson, Abu Bakr al-Razi may have been "deliberately misdescribed" by his fellow townsman Abu Hatim al-Razi. In this view, Abu Bakr was mainly arguing against the use of miracles to prove Muhammad's prophecy, against anthropomorphism, and against the uncritical acceptance of taqlīd vs naẓar.
- Abu Isa al-Warraq was a ninth-century Arab skeptic scholar and critic of Islam and religion in general. Al-Warraq also doubted claims portraying Muhammad as a prophet.
- Arab skeptic, rationalist philosopher and poet Al-Maʿarri (973-1057 CE) started out as a Sunni Muslim but later he repudiated Islam, became a critic of Abrahamic religions and Islam, and wrote a satire on the Qu'ran. He wrote and taught that religion itself was a "fable invented by the ancients" and that humans were "of two sorts: those with brains, but no religion, and those with religion, but no brains."
- Manuel II Palaiologos, Byzantine Emperor, wrote in 1391 "Show me just what Muhammad brought that was new and there you will find things only evil and inhuman, such as his command to spread by the sword the faith he preached".

== Early Modern period ==
- Martin Luther, the father of the Protestant Reformation, wrote on Islam.
- French polymath and philosopher Voltaire wrote Mahomet, ou Le Fanatisme (1741), a religious satire on the life of Muhammad, described as a self-deceived, perverted religious fanatic and manipulator, and his hunger for political power behind the foundation of Islam. He also wrote letters on the brutality of Muhammad and his followers, affirming that it stemmed from superstition and lack of Enlightenment.

== 19th century ==
- During the late 19th and early 20th century, the new methods of Higher criticism were applied to the Qu'ran, claiming that it had a non-divine origin. Ignác Goldziher and Henry Corbin wrote about the influence of Zoroastrianism, and others wrote on the influence of Judaism, Christianity and Sabianism.

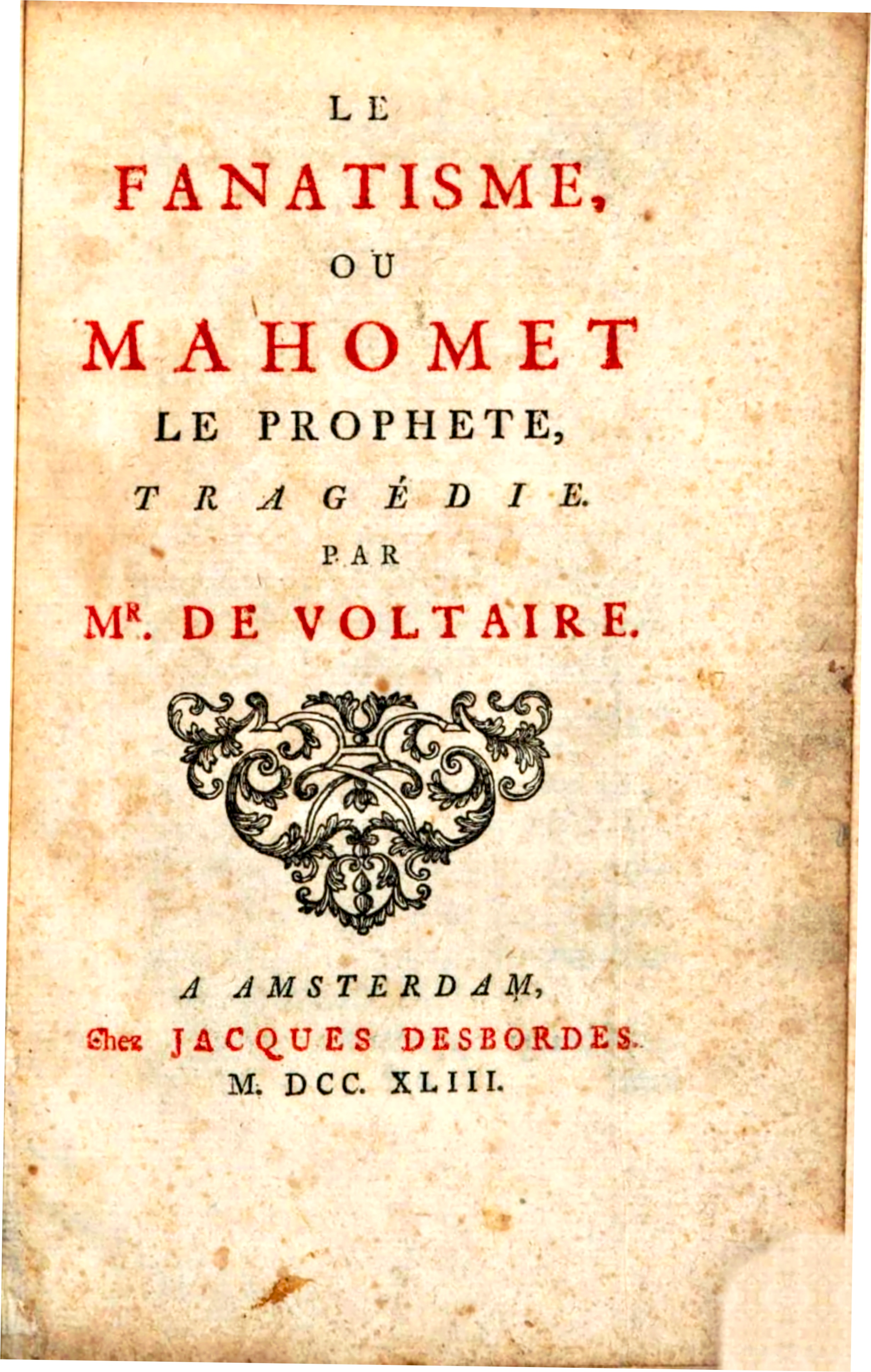
Frontispiece of the 1753 edition of Voltaire's play Le fanatisme, ou Mahomet le Prophète

- Alexis de Tocqueville, French political thinker and historian, said about Islam: "I studied the Kuran a great deal ... I came away from that study with the conviction that by and large there have been few religions in the world as deadly to men as that of Muhammed."
- John Quincy Adams, sixth President of the United States (1825–1829), wrote: "In the seventh century of the Christian era, a wandering Arab of the lineage of Hagar [i.e., Muhammad], the Egyptian, combining the powers of transcendent genius, with the preternatural energy of a fanatic, and the fraudulent spirit of an impostor, proclaimed himself as a messenger from Heaven, and spread desolation and delusion over an extensive portion of the earth.
- Hilaire Belloc, Anglo-French writer and historian.
- G. K. Chesterton, English writer.
- Dayanand Saraswati, in his book Satyarth Prakash, he criticized Islam.
- Pandit Lekh Ram was an Arya Samaj Hindu leader and writer in India who was active in converting Muslims to Hinduism.
- Winston Churchill, the British Prime Minister through most of World War II, criticized what he alleged to be of the effects Islam had on its believers. In his 1899 book The River War he attributed to Muslims their fanatical frenzy combined with fatalistic apathy, enslavement of women, and militant prozelityzing.

== Contemporary critics ==
=== Moderate Muslims ===
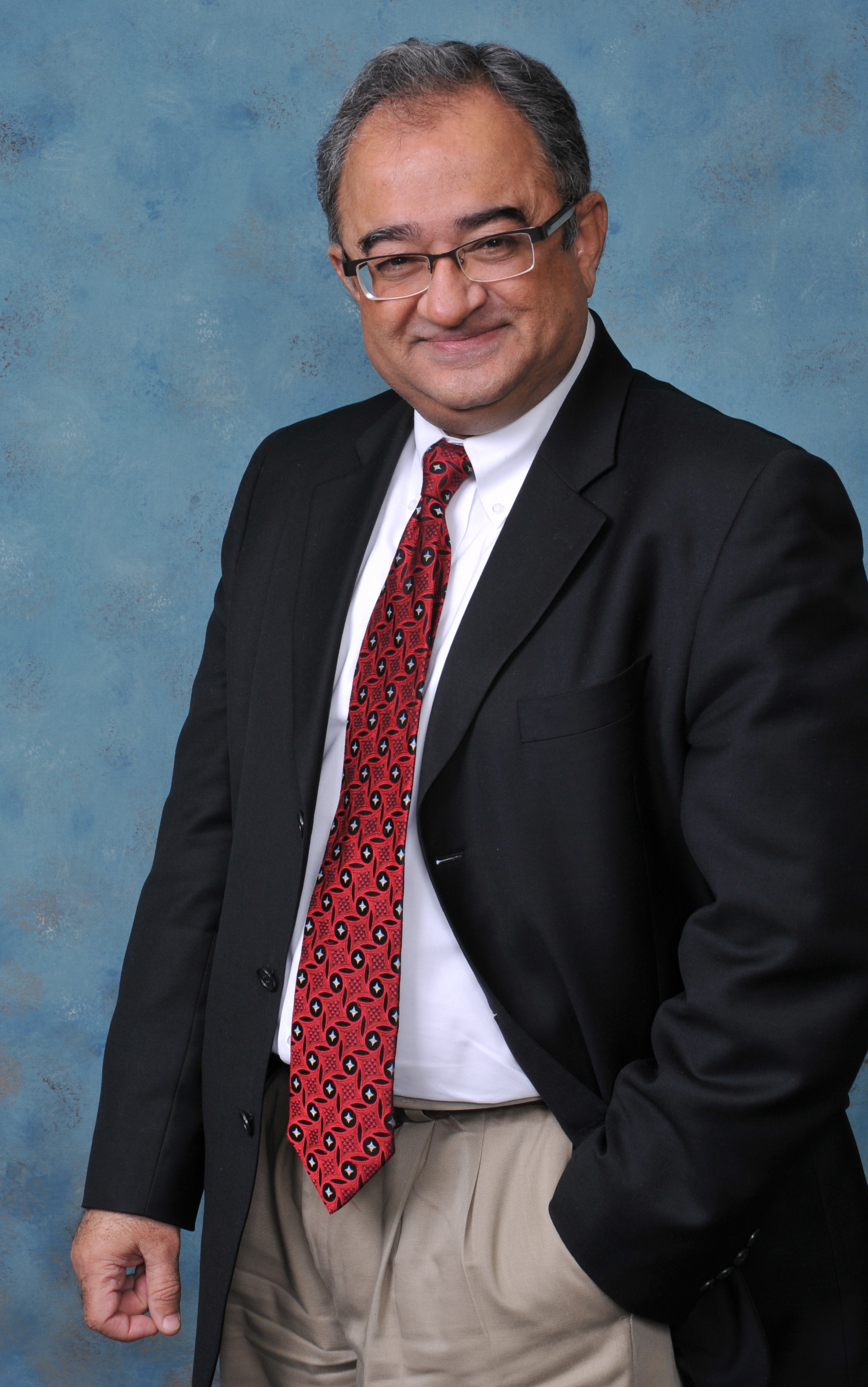
Tarek Fatah

- Chekannur Maulavi, founder of the Quranist Movement in Kerala and a critic of hadith.
- Ibrahim Al-Buleihi is a Saudi liberal writer, thinker and philosopher who is currently a member of the Saudi Shura Council.
- Irshad Manji (born 1968), a Ugandan-Canadian of Egyptian and Gujarati descent, is a journalist, Quranist Muslim, and advocate of a "reformist" interpretation of Islam.
- Tarek Fatah was a Pakistani-Canadian writer and broadcaster, as well as a secular, progressive, and liberal activist.
- Necla Kelek (born 1957) is a Turkish-German feminist and social scientist.
- Raheel Raza (born 1949/1950) is a Pakistani-Canadian moderate Muslim critical of "Islamic extremism" and of what she has called "inequality toward Muslim women".
- Zuhdi Jasser, medical doctor and former Lieutenant Commander in the United States Navy, president and founder of American Islamic Forum for Democracy.
- Stephen Suleyman Schwartz (born 1948) is an American Sufi convert, journalist, columnist, and author. His background is on the traditional political left. He is a critic of Islamic Fundamentalism, especially the Wahhabi sect of Sunni Islam.
- Khalid Duran (1939–2010), born in Spain to Hispano-Moroccan Muslim parents, worked in many countries, was a specialist in the history, sociology and politics of the Islamic world, and coined the term "Islamofascism" to describe the push by some Islamist clerics to "impose religious orthodoxy on the state and the citizenry".
- Mohammad Tawhidi, Muslim influencer and reformist imam.
- Tufail Ahmad, British journalist and political commentator of Indian origin and MEMRI reporter.
- Seyran Ateş opened a liberal mosque in Berlin to break with conservative traditions. The mosque caused international backlash from Muslims. Since then she has been living under police protection.
- Qanta Ahmed, a British-American physician and author who describes herself as a practicing Muslim and a feminist but is opposed to Islamism and calls on Western governments to ban organizations such as the Muslim Brotherhood.

=== Former Muslims ===
There are also outspoken former Muslims who believe that Islam is the primary cause of what they see as the mistreatment of minority groups in Muslim countries and communities. Almost all of them now live in the West, many under assumed names as they have had death threats made against them by Islamic groups and individuals.

==== Converts to other religions ====
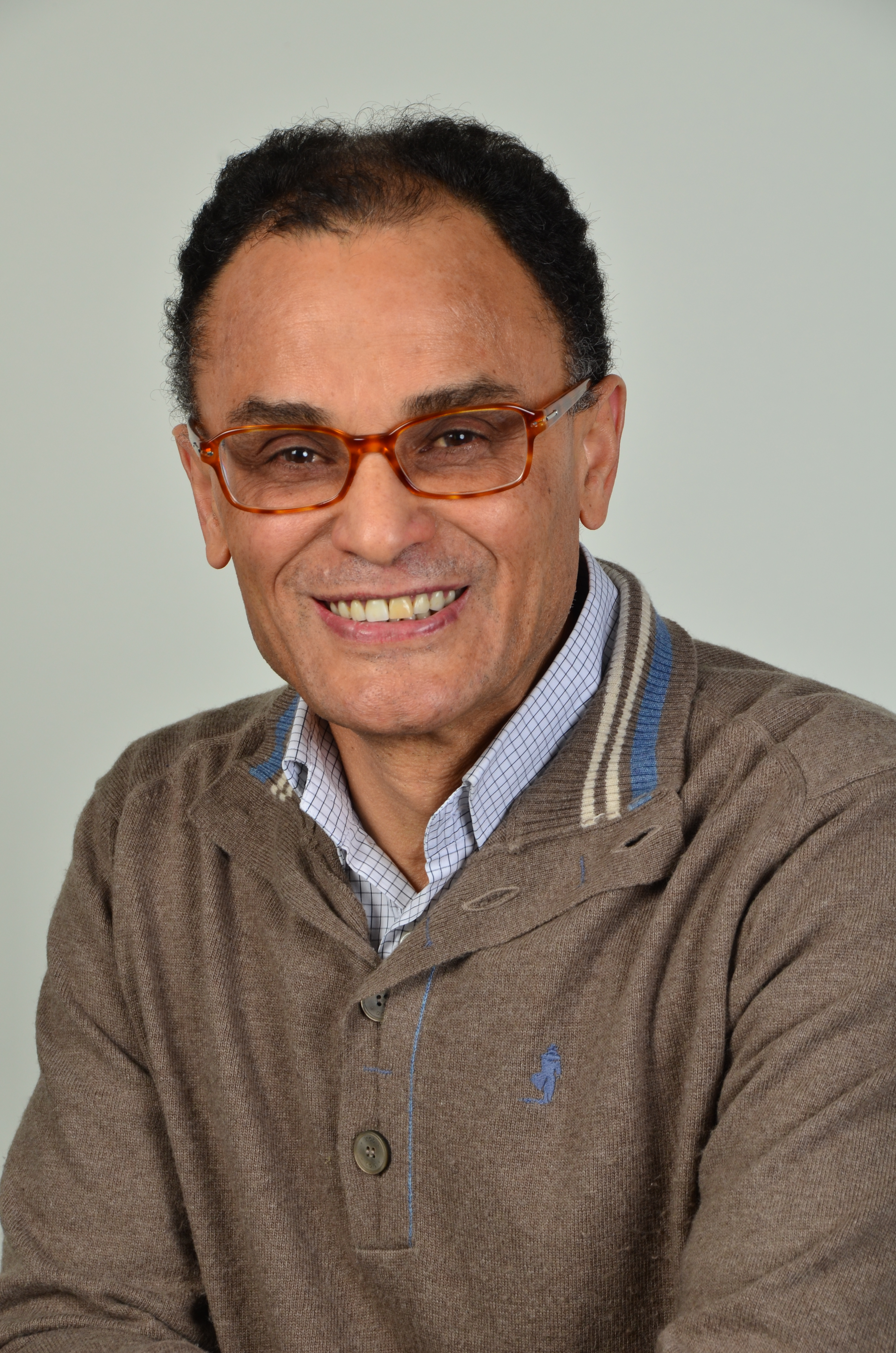
Magdi Allam has criticised Islam since his conversion to Catholicism

- Nonie Darwish, an Egyptian-American convert to Protestant Christianity who founded the pro-Israel web site Arabs for Israel and stated that "Islam is more than a religion, it is a totalitarian state". She is also the author of Now They Call Me Infidel: Why I Renounced Jihad for America, Israel, and the War on Terror.
- Magdi Allam, an outspoken Egyptian-born Italian journalist who describes Islam as intrinsically violent and characterised by "hate and intolerance". He converted to Catholicism and was baptised by Pope Benedict XVI during an Easter Vigil service on March 23, 2008.
- Zachariah Anani, a Baptist Christian and a former Sunni Muslim Lebanese militia fighter. Anani said that Islamic doctrine teaches nothing less than the "ambushing, seizing and slaying" of non-believers, especially Jews and Christians.
- Anwar Shaikh (1928–2006) was a Pakistani-British author who converted to Hinduism and wrote several books critical of Islam.
- Sabatina James (born 1982) is a Pakistani-Austrian author and convert to Roman Catholic Christianity who was meant to undergo an arranged marriage with her cousin but escaped and started a new life
- Mosab Hassan Yousef, the son of a Hamas founder, a former Israeli spy, and a convert to Christianity. He has written Son of Hamas: A Gripping Account of Terror, Betrayal, Political Intrigue, and Unthinkable Choices.
- Majed el-Shafie is an Egyptian-Canadian convert to Christianity who was tortured and condemned to death for apostasy in his fatherland. He is the president and founder of One Free World International (OFWI), a human rights organization.
- Ali Sina, pseudonym of the founder of several anti-Islam and anti-Muslim websites
- Sarah Haider founded the organization Ex-Muslims of North America after she left Islam. Haider supports other ex-Muslims.
- Rachid Hammami (born 1971) is a Moroccan Christian convert from Islam who hosts a weekly call-in show where he criticizes Islam.
- Nabeel Qureshi, Ahmadiyya Muslim converted to Christianity. His book Seeking Allah and finding Jesus is famous among Christians and Muslims. He had debated with Muslim scholars.

==== Ex-Muslim irreligionists ====
- Abdullah al-Qasemi (1907–1996), one of the most controversial intellectuals in the Arab world because of his radical change from defending Salafism to defending atheism and rejecting organized religion.
- Ahmad Kasravi was a pre-eminent Iranian linguist, nationalist, religious reformer, historian and former Shia cleric.
- Ali Dashti, Iranian senator and critic of Muhammad in "Twenty Three Years" in Persian.

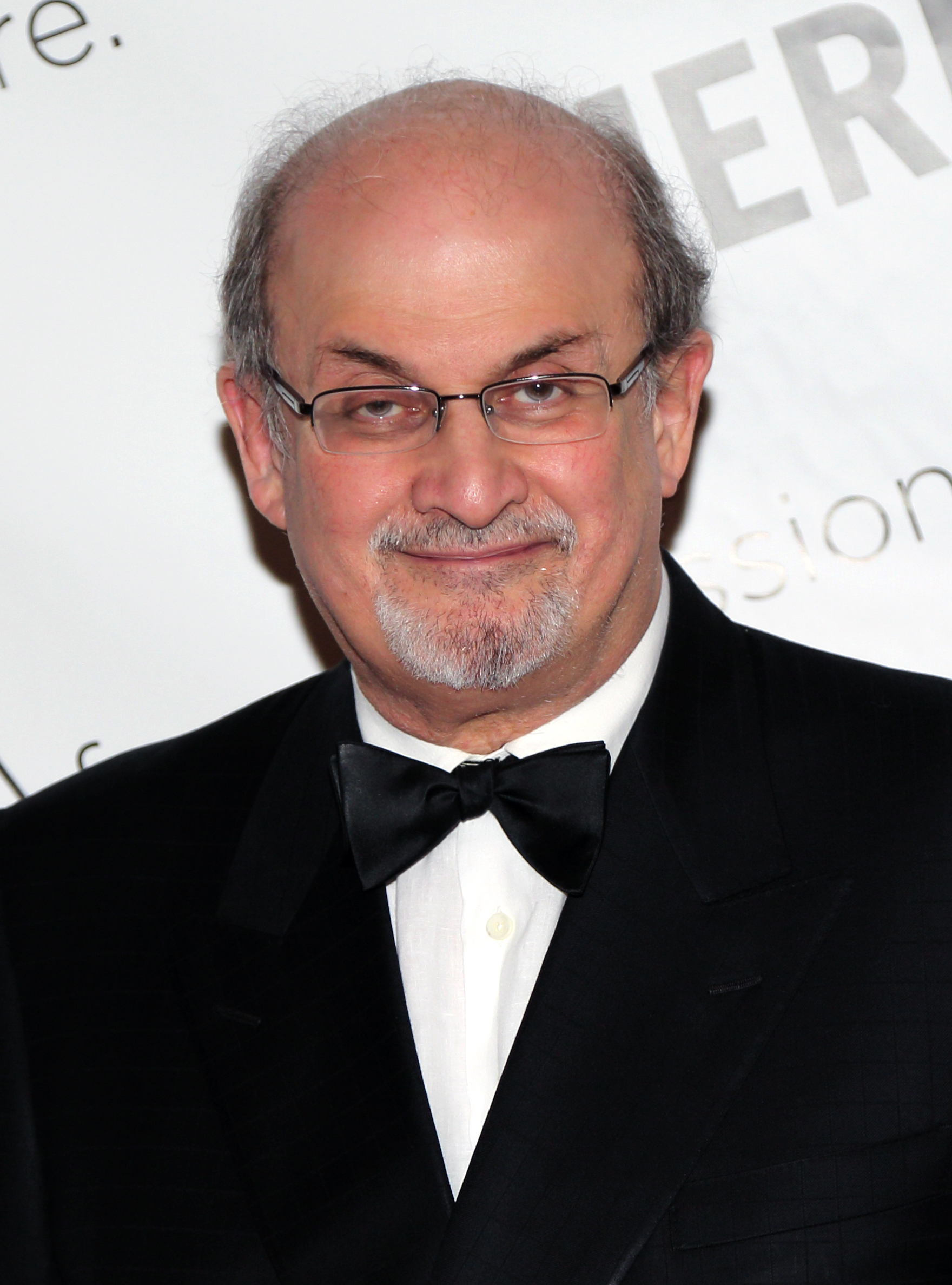
Writer Salman Rushdie, a former Muslim, wrote The Satanic Verses

- Salman Rushdie (born 1947), Indian-British novelist and essayist. His fourth novel, The Satanic Verses (1988), was the centre of a major controversy.
- Taslima Nasrin, Bengali/Bangladeshi ex-physician turned feminist author. She is an atheist and a severe critic of Islam and of religion in general who describes herself as a secular humanist.
- Nyamko Sabuni, Burundian-Swedish atheist, served as the Minister of Integration and Gender Equality (Sweden, 2006–2013) and advocated to ban the veil, as well as establish compulsory gynecological examinations for schoolgirls to guard against female genital mutilation, stating, "I will never accept that women and girls are oppressed in the name of religion", and declaring it is not her intent to reform Islam but only to denounce "unacceptable" practices. She has received death threats, requiring 24-hour police protection, for her views.
- Maryam Namazie, Iranian-born human rights activist, communist, atheist, the leader of the Council of Ex-Muslims of Britain, and a Central Committee member of the Worker-communist Party of Iran, wishing the overthrow of the current Iranian regime.
- Ibn Warraq, secularist British author born in India and raised in Pakistan, intellectual, scholar and founder of the Institute for the Secularisation of Islamic Society and a senior research fellow at the Center for Inquiry specializing in Qur'anic criticism.
- Wafa Sultan, Syrian-American psychiatrist who has pointed out that Muhammad said: "I was ordered to fight the people until they believe in Allah and his Messenger." Sultan has called on Islamic teachers to review their writings and teachings and remove every call to fight people who do not believe as Muslims. Dr. Sultan is now in hiding as she received threats after appearing on the al-Jazeera TV show.
- Turan Dursun (1934–4 September 1990), Turkish scholar and author. He worked as a Shi'a cleric before becoming an atheist during his study of the history of monotheistic religions. Dursun was assassinated outside his home in Istanbul.
- Yahya Hassan (born 1995), Danish poet of Palestinian background who has attracted attention and stirred debate about Islam's place in Denmark based on poetry he wrote which was critical of Islam.
- Ehsan Jami (born 1985), Iranian-Dutch socialist politician.
- Yasmine Mohammed, Canadian educator and human rights activist.
- Majid Mohammadi, an Iranian-American sociologist who has published dozens of books on Shi`i Islamism, Islamist states, Islamist propaganda, and Islamist movements.
- Luai Ahmed, a Yemeni-Swedish journalist, columnist and influencer considered as a controversial critic of the radical Islam and the anti-Semitism and hatred of Israel inherent in it. He is affiliated with Sweden Democrats, a Swedish right-wing nationalist party. Ahmed is openly gay and considers himself Zionist.

=== Christians ===
==== Christians of Mideastern background ====
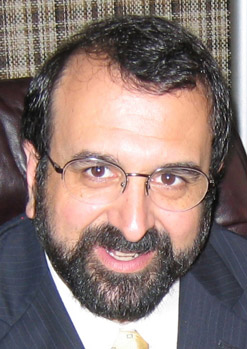
Robert Spencer, Melkite Catholic author who has written on Islamic terrorism and jihad

This subsection does not include converts to Christianity from Islam, who are instead listed in the subsection "Former Muslims". There is a large diaspora of Middle Eastern Christians in the West, some of whom have fled persecution in their homelands. In fact, most Middle Easterners in the United States come from Christian families. Most belong to specific ethnoreligious—rather than simply religious—groups, as religion and ethnicity are largely intertwined in the Middle East.

- Robert Spencer (born 1962, a Melkite), American author and blogger best known for his criticism of Islam and research into Islamic terrorism and jihad.
- Brigitte Gabriel (born 1964, a Maronite Catholic), survivor of the sectarian Civil War in Lebanon (1975–1990), lived in Israel some time before moving to the United States, where she is an author, activist, and journalist. Gabriel founded the American Congress for Truth and ACT! for America.
- Nakoula Basseley Nakoula (born 1957, Copt) is an Egyptian-born US resident best known as a key figure in the production of the Innocence of Muslims, an anti-Islamic video which was blamed by the Obama Administration for the 2012 Benghazi attack, an accusation that has been disputed by some and termed deliberately deceitful by others.
- Zakaria Botros (born 1934 a Copt), Egyptian priest who has worked in Australia and is best known for his critiques of the Qur'an and other books of Islam. Al-Qaeda has put a $60 million bounty on his head.
- Raymond Ibrahim (born 1973, a Copt), born in the United States to Egyptian immigrants, is an American research librarian, translator, author, and columnist. His focus is Arabic history and language, and current events.
- Walid Shoebat, an ex-Muslim, former PLO terrorist, and a Christian Zionist.
- Ayaan Hirsi Ali (born 1969), Somali-born Dutch-American writer and politician. Since renouncing Islam in favor of atheism in the early 2000s, she has focused on the rights of Muslim women, saying that "they aspire to live by their faith as best they can, but their faith robs them of their rights." In late 2023, she denounced her prior atheism, believing its attacks upon all religion leave young people with a moral vacuum in which dangerous beliefs may flourish, adopting in its place Christianity.

==== Christians of non-Mideastern background ====
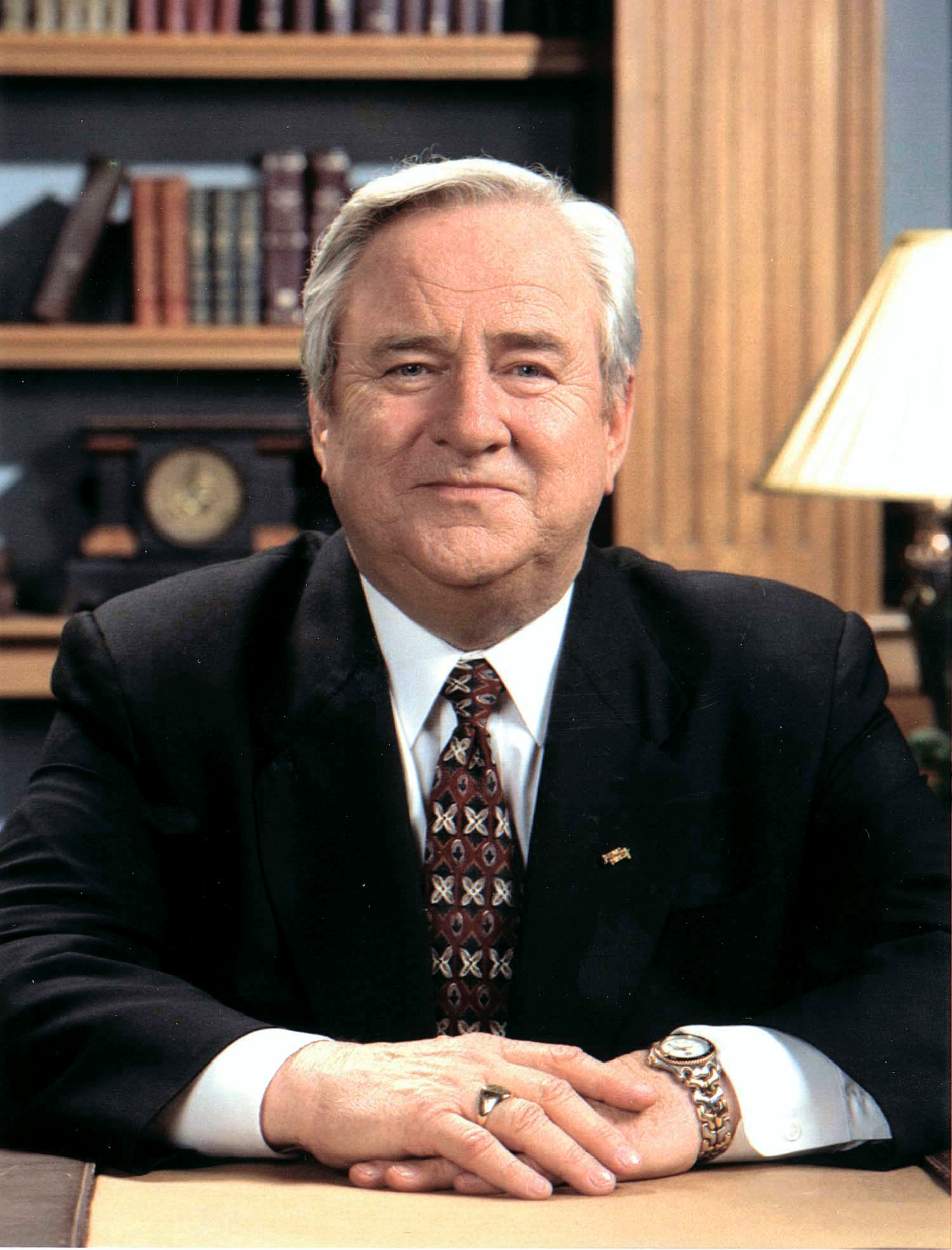
Baptist minister Jerry Falwell criticised Muhammad

- Pat Robertson, expresses the view that "Islam wants to take over the world and is not a religion of peace", and that radical Muslims are "satanic", and that Osama bin Laden was a "true follower of Muhammad".
- Jerry Falwell, another American conservative Baptist minister, characterized Muhammad as being a 'terrorist'.
- Franklin Graham, described Islam as an 'evil and wicked religion' and suggested that those who believed Islam to be "wonderful" should "go and live under the Taliban somewhere".
- R. Albert Mohler, Jr., president of Southern Baptist Theological Seminary, who described the Islamic theology as false and destructive and believes that Muslims are motivated by demonic power.
- Brigitte Bardot (1934–2025), French former actress, singer, and fashion model, who later became an animal rights activist. During the 1990s, she generated controversy by criticising immigration and Islam in France, and has been fined five times for inciting racial hatred.
- Pim Fortuyn (1948–2002), Roman Catholic, was a Dutch politician, sociologist, and founder of the Pim Fortuyn List party who provoked controversy with his stated views about multiculturalism, immigration, and Islam.
- Ann Coulter (born 1961), American conservative social and political commentator, writer, syndicated columnist, and lawyer.
- Steven Emerson, American journalist, author, and pundit on national security, terrorism, and Islamic extremism.
- Frank Gaffney, founder and president of the Center for Security Policy, columnist at The Washington Times, Big Peace, and Townhall, and radio host on Secure Freedom Radio.
- Srđa Trifković (born 1954), Serbian-American writer on international affairs and foreign affairs editor for the paleoconservative magazine Chronicles.
- Vladimir Zhirinovsky (1946–2022), Russian politician, leader of LDPR, believed that Russia should build a wall to stop Muslims from the Caucasus
- Bruce Bawer (born 1956), American writer who has been a resident of Norway since 1999. He is a literary, film, and cultural critic and poet who has also written about gay rights, Christianity, and Islam.
- Kathy Shaidle (1964-2021), Roman Catholic, was a Canadian author, columnist, poet and blogger.
- Terry Jones (born 1951), pastor of Dove World Outreach Center, a small nondenominational Christian church. He first gained public attention in 2010 for his plan to burn Qur'ans on the ninth anniversary of the September 11 attacks.

=== Observant Jews ===
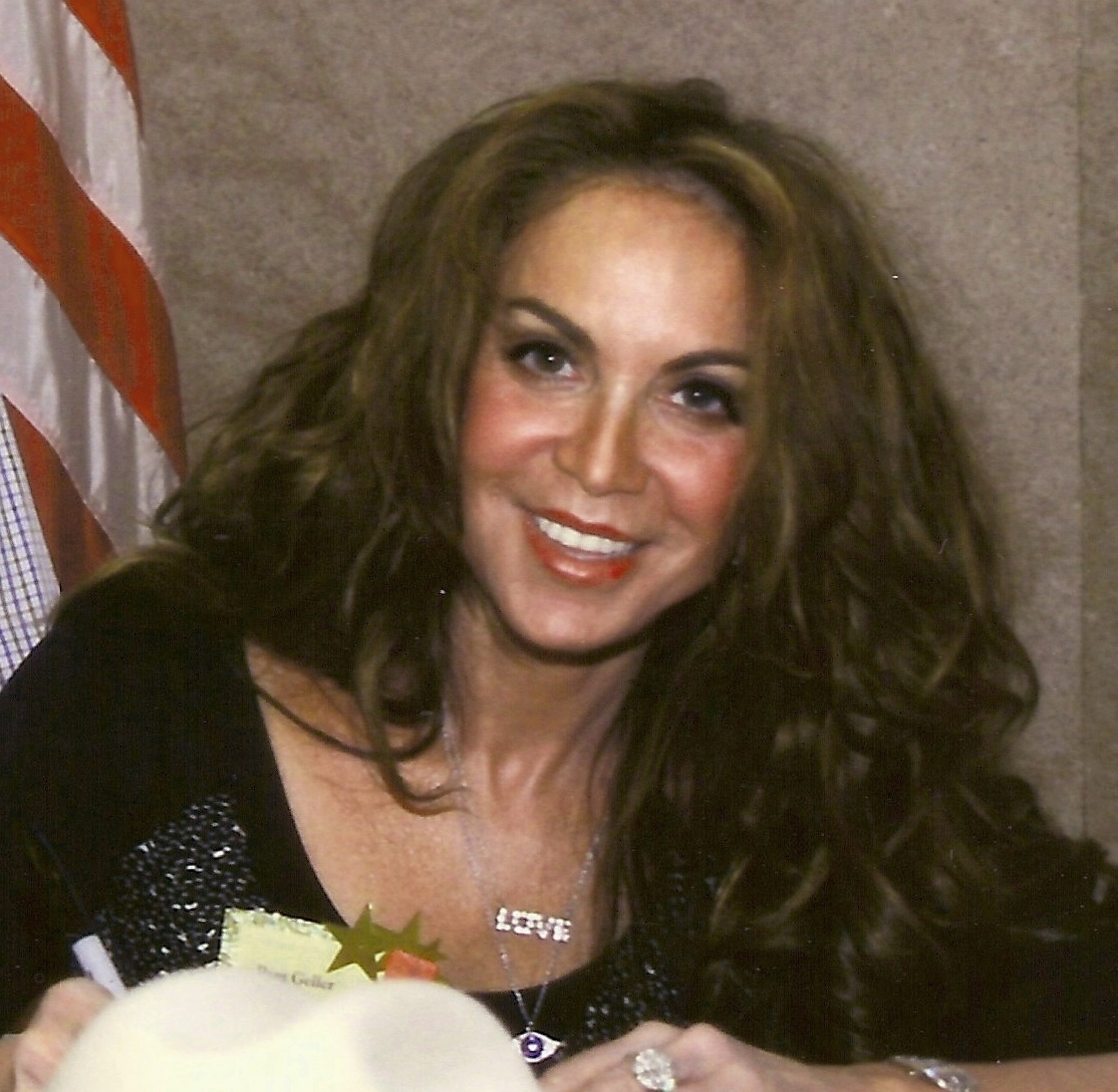
Pamela Geller is a Jewish writer and critic of Islam

- Pamela Geller (born 1958), American conservative author, blogger, commentator, and political activist. She is Jewish and has described herself as "a proud, fierce Zionist". Her blog is Atlas Shrugs, the title of which is eponymous with an Ayn Rand novel. She is a co-founder of SIOA with Robert Spencer, along with whom she is one of the best-known critics of Islam in the United States today.
- Bat Ye'or (born 1933), Egyptian-British writer and political commentator. She is from a Sephardi family, whom she was displaced with by the Suez War of 1956. Bat Ye'or has authored a fair number of works on the subject and coined the political neologism "Eurabia".
- David Horowitz, American writer and policy advocate, founder and current president of the David Horowitz Freedom Center, founder of Students for Academic Freedom.
- Geert Wilders, Dutch politician and non-Jewish Zionist of agnostic views, wrote the short film Fitna and has campaigned to ban the Qu'ran in the Netherlands because it conflicts with the Dutch laws and calls for violence in general.
- Benny Morris, Israeli historian who views the Israel-Palestinian conflict as a facet of a global clash of civilizations between Islamic fundamentalism and the Western World, saying that "There is a deep problem in Islam. It's a world whose values are different. A world in which human life doesn't have the same value as it does in the West, in which freedom, democracy, openness and creativity are alien."
- Phyllis Chesler (born 1940), American writer, psychotherapist, and professor emerita of psychology and women's studies. In more recent years, Chesler has written several works on such subjects as antisemitism, Islam, and honour killings. Also, she has discussed the failure of organised Western feminism to address Islamic oppression of women due to the former's alliance with leftist currents.
- David Yerushalmi, Orthodox Jew, is an American lawyer and a political activist who has been called the driving law behind the anti-sharia movement in his country.
- Debbie Schlussel (born 1969), Orthodox Jew of Polish pedigree, is an American-born attorney, film critic, conservative political commentator, and a blogger.
- Henryk Broder (born 1946), Polish-German journalist, author, and TV personality.

=== Members of Indian religions ===
Indian religions, also known as the Dharmic religions, include Hinduism, Jainism, Buddhism, and Sikhism. This subsection does not include converts from Islam, who are instead listed in the subsection "Former Muslims". See also the List of converts to Hinduism from Islam.

- B. R. Ambedkar (born 1891), was an Indian jurist, economist, politician and social reformer. He was independent India's first Minister of Law and Justice, and the chief architect of the Constitution of India.
- V. S. Naipaul (born 1932), Nobel prize-winning, Trinidadian-born British novelist of Hindu heritage, who claims that Islam has had a "calamitous effect on converted peoples", destroying their ancestral culture and history.
- Ole Nydahl (born 1941), also known as Lama Ole, is a Danish Lama and a convert to the Karma Kagyu school of Tibetan Buddhism.
- Ashin Wirathu (born 1968), Burmese Buddhist monk, and the spiritual leader of the anti-Islamic movement in Burma.
- Sita Ram Goel (1921–2003), Indian activist, writer, and publisher who was critical of both Muslim and Christian influence over India. He had Marxist leanings during the 1940s but later became an outspoken anti-communist. A one-time atheist, he became an observant Hindu and in his latter career adhered to Hindu nationalism.
- Ram Swarup (1920–1998), independent Hindu thinker and prolific author. His works took a critical stance against Christianity, Islam and Communism.
- Nirad C. Chaudhuri (1897–1999), British writer and man of letters born in Kishoreganj, then part of Bengal in British India. He was sympathetic to the right-wing Hindu nationalist movement.

=== Western irreligionists ===
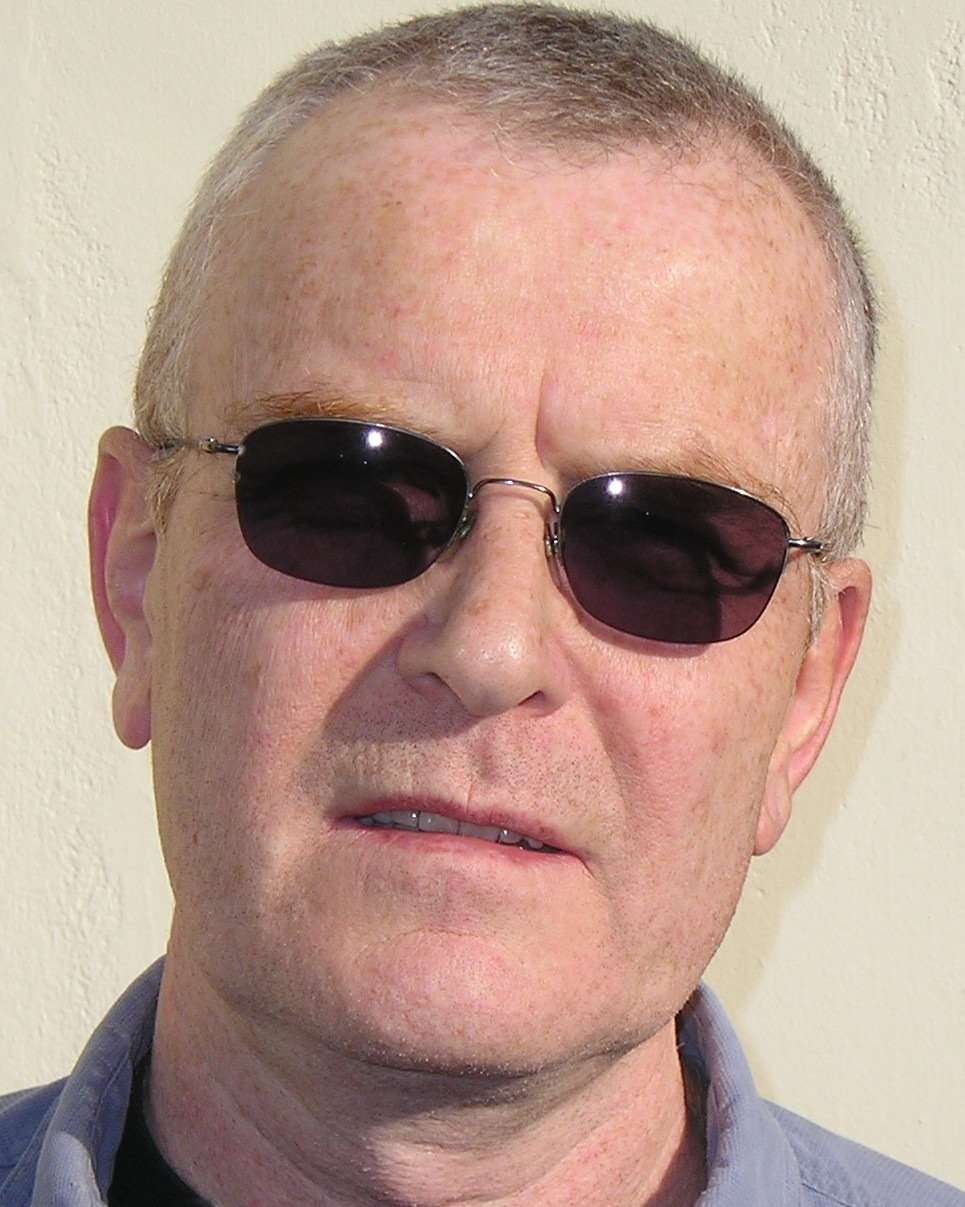
Atheist comedian Pat Condell criticises Islam in his YouTube videos

For irreligious former Muslims, see the above subsection "Former Muslims".

- Theo van Gogh (1957–2004), relative of the world-famous painter Vincent van Gogh, was a Dutch film director who collaborated with Ayaan Hirsi Ali to produce the short film Submission (2004) and was assassinated the same year by Mohammed Bouyeri, a Moroccan-Dutch Muslim.
- Michel Onfray, French philosopher and atheist. Onfray attacks Islam and other monotheistic religions, speaking of "Muslim fascism" that has risen with the Islamic Revolution in Iran, and considers Islamic teachings to be "structurally archaic".
- Douglas Murray, British neoconservative writer and commentator.
- Oriana Fallaci, Italian journalist and novelist, wrote three short books after the events of September 11, 2001, advancing the argument that the "Western world is in danger of being engulfed by radical Islam".
- Christopher Hitchens, British-American author and journalist.
- Sam Harris, in The End of Faith, argues that Muslim extremism is simply a consequence of taking the Qur'an literally, and is skeptical that moderate Islam is possible.
- Richard Dawkins, biologist, author, public intellectual.
- Koenraad Elst (born 1959), Belgian orientalist and Indologist known primarily for his writings in support for the Out of India linguistic theory. He was born to Flemish Catholic parents but is an adherent of secular humanism, which may or may not be considered a religion.
- Jennifer McCreight (born 1987), American blogger, atheist, sceptic, and feminist who devised the 2010 Boobquake event in response to news reports that Iran's Hojatoleslam Kazem Seddiqi had blamed women who dress immodestly for causing earthquakes.
- Pat Condell, comedian and YouTube video blogger, who records videos about Islam and its alleged harmful effects particularly on British society.
- Bill Maher, American comedian and political chat show host.
- Tommy Robinson, founded and led the English Defence League.
- Anders Behring Breivik (born 1979), Norwegian perpetrator of the 2011 Norway attacks, sought to emulate the terrorist techniques of al-Qaeda and has confessed that a motive for the crime was his intent to popularise his extensive manifesto, which deals with an array of social, political, and historical issues, partly written by him and partly cited from other authors. He has been emphatic in his description of himself as a "cultural Christian", albeit strongly secular and hardly a believer.
- Anne Marie Waters, British politician.

=== Practitioners of traditional African religions ===
The Traditional African religions are the traditional beliefs and practices of the African people. Some of these traditional beliefs includes the various ethnic religions of Africa.

- Tamsier Joof (born 1973), British born dancer/choreographer, entrepreneur and radio personality of Senegalese and Gambian heritage expresses the view that: "neither Islam, nor Christianity are peaceful or Godly religions, but wicked and dangerous ideologies which have done nothing but destroyed Africa and her people since they landed on African shores." Tamsier, a devout follower of Serer religion (a ƭat Roog), regard Islam and Christianity as "foreign cults which have caused more damage to Africa and divided her people." He is a strong critic of the powerful Muslim brotherhoods of Senegal, whom he regard as greedy and selfish; and African Muslims and Christians who like to demonise the traditional religions of their forefathers, whom he regard as hypocrites and cowards. He holds strong anti-Arab and anti-Islamic sentiments, both of which he regard as "a curse", and is a strong supporter of Pan-Africanism and Zionism.

=== Other ===
- Alice Schwarzer (born 1942), a German feminist, has been criticizing political Islam for decades, particularly with regard to women's rights. Schwarzer also goes against contemporary feminists that, according to her, promote said Islam.
- Bill Warner (born 1941), American writer and the founder of the Center for the Study of Political Islam International.
- Howard Bloom (born 1943), American author, atheist, sociologist, and public relations professional in the music industry.
- Sami Aldeeb (born 1949), Palestinian lawyer with Swiss citizenship, author of many books and articles on Arab and Islamic law.
- Salwan Momika (1986-2025), Iraqi Assyrian refugee and atheist activist, who burned the Quran numerous times in 2023 and has campaigned to ban the Quran in Sweden and classify Islam as a terrorist religion.
- Alvin Tan (born 1988), Malaysian Chinese blogger, secularist and free-speech activist who has posted online content critical of Islam.
