= Abdulrahman bin Abdullah Al Barrak =

Saudi Arabian academic (born 1956)

Minister of Civil Service
- In office 13 December 2011 – 2015
- Prime Minister: King Abdullah
- Preceded by: Mohammed bin Ali Al Fayez
- Succeeded by: Khalid bin Abdullah Al Araj

Personal details
- Born: 1956 (age 69–70) Al-Hasa, Saudi Arabia
- Education: King Saud University; University of Pittsburgh

Abdulrahman bin Abdullah Al Barrak (Arabic: عبد الرحمن بن عبد الله البراك; born 1956) is a Saudi academic. He was the minister of civil service between 13 December 2011 and 2015.

== Early life and education ==
Al Barrak was born in Al-Hasa in 1956. He obtained a bachelor of arts degree in business administration from King Saud University in 1980. He has masters' and PhD degrees both in public administration from the University of Pittsburgh in 1983 and in 1989, respectively.

== Career ==
Al Barrak began his career as a teaching assistant in 1980. He became an assistant professor in 1989. Until 1999, he worked at King Saud University, serving at various academic and administrative positions. On 26 May 2001, he was appointed to the Shoura Council. From 2003 to 2007, he served as vice-chairman of two committees at the council. On 23 March 2007, he became the chairman of the committee on administration and human resources petitions of the council. He began to serve as a vice speaker of the council on 17 May 2008. He was named as the assistant chairman of the council in February 2009.

Al Barrak was appointed minister of civil service on 13 December 2011. He replaced Mohammed bin Ali Al Fayez who had been in the post since June 1999 when the office established. His tenure lasted in 2015, and he was replaced by Khalid bin Abdullah Al Araj in the post.

Political offices
Preceded by Muhammed Al Fayez	Minister of Civil Service; 2011 – 2015	Succeeded by Khalid bin Abdullah Al Araj
