= Hamed Abdel-Samad =

German-Egyptian political scientist and author (born 1972)

- حامد عبد الصمد
- Hamed Abdel-Samad at the Frankfurt Book Fair 2026
- Born: 1 February 1972 (age 54); Giza, Egypt

Hamed Abdel-Samad (Arabic: حامد عبد الصمد, Ḥāmid ʿAbd aṣ-Ṣamad, IPA: [ˈħæːmed ʕæbdesˈsˤɑmɑd]; Born 1 February 1972) is a German-Egyptian author critical of Islam.

== Life ==
Abdel-Samad was born as the third of five children, the son of a Sunni Muslim imam. Abdel-Samad came to Germany in 1995 at the age of 23. He soon married a "rebellious, left-wing teacher with a penchant for mysticism" who was 18 years older than himself. Abdel-Samad studied Japanese, English and French in Cairo as well as political science in Augsburg. He worked as a scholar in Erfurt and Braunschweig. In Japan, where he was involved with Eastern spirituality, he met his second wife. He taught and conducted research until the end of 2009 at the Institute for Jewish History and Culture at LMU Munich; his dissertation topic was: Bild der Juden in ägyptischen Schulbüchern ("Image of the Jews in Egyptian textbooks”). Subsequently, he decided to become a full-time professional writer.

A member of the Muslim Brotherhood in his university days, a stay in a summer camp run by them triggered doubts, causing him to become skeptical, and eventually an atheist.

On 24 November 2013, Egyptian news websites (citing his brother Mahmoud) reported that Hamed Abdel-Samad had been kidnapped. It was then reported that he resurfaced on Wednesday 27 November 2013. His mother denied that he had been kidnapped.

== Work ==
Abdel-Samad became known to the German public through his book Mein Abschied vom Himmel (My Farewell from Heaven, 2009). Abdel-Samad said that the book was neither an attack on his culture, nor a call to abandon the Muslim faith. Rather, he just wanted to understand the contradictions of his own life. Following the book's publication in Egypt, a group issued a fatwa threatening Abdel-Samad and he was put under police protection.

Abdel-Samad calls for an "Islam lite" in Europe without shari'a, jihad, "gender apartheid", proselytism, and "entitlement mentality". He criticized the German political establishment for appeasing Islam, while ignoring fears about Islam. According to Abdel-Samad, this behavior created resentment in the German population.

Abdel-Samad participated in the 2nd German Islam Conference 2010-2013 held at the invitation of the German Federal Interior Minister Thomas de Maizière.

In autumn 2010, Abdel-Samad took the journalist Henryk M. Broder on a 30,000 km-long road trip through Germany for a five-part TV series.

In an interview aired on the Salafi Islamist Egyptian channel Al-Hafez on 7 June 2013 (as translated by MEMRI), Egyptian cleric and Al-Azhar professor Mahmoud Shaaban accused Abdel-Samad of committing "heresy", and stated that "he must be killed for being a heretic ... if he refuses to recant". Shaaban also stated that "after he has been confronted with the evidence, his killing is permitted if the [Egyptian] government does not do it." On the same day, the Egyptian Sheikh Assem Abdel Maged declared a fatwa against the publicist calling for all Muslims to kill the writer. The German Federal Government called on the Egyptian government to guarantee freedom of expression and personal safety and the Egyptian Chargé d'Affaires in Berlin was summoned.

In 2016, he was questioned by the Berlin police for alleged sedition. This was criticized as an attack on free speech by him and German-Israeli historian Michael Wolffsohn in the German newspaper Die Welt.

In his latest book, Islamic Fascism (Der islamische Faschismus, 2014), Abdel-Samad describes Islam as a fascist ideology under the cover of a religion.

=== YouTube activities ===
As of 12 January 2020, Abdel-Samad's official YouTube channel, Hamed.TV, had more than 140,000 subscribers and more than 29 million video views. The channel is almost entirely in Arabic (only 8 out of 264 uploads being in other languages).

Between May 2015 and April 2019, Abdel-Samad presented the weekly show Ṣundūq al-Islām ("Box of Islam"), in which he discussed various topics of Islamic religious history, as well as contemporary Muslim reality.

The channel was deleted by YouTube without comment on 17 June 2019, but due to numerous protests, the channel was restored soon after.

In September 2019, Abdel-Samad started a new show called Ṣundūq al-Insān ("Box of man", "Box of the human being"), which was intended to cover a wider scope of historical and social topics.

During Ramadan 2016 and 2017, Abdel-Samad appeared as a regular guest on the channel of Moroccan-born Christian televangelist Rachid Hammami for the daily programme Āya wa-Taʿlīq ("Verse and comment"), where the two discussed Qur'an verses in a satirical manner.

== Views on Israel and Palestine ==
Following Gaza war in 2023, Abdel-Samad posted on Facebook to show his support to the Palestinian people and condemning "the killing of thousands of children in Gaza", he explained "I have always criticized Hamas and will continue to. My criticism of the ideology of hatred within Islam is not getting silenced either. But that doesn't mean turning a blind eye when innocent Muslims are killed. UN mourns the killing of thousands of children in Gaza." he added "This message must not remain a side-scenes thing in war coverage. Just like the terrorist attack on the 7th October is to be condemned, so is this collective punishment of civilians to be condemned. So far, many civilians have died in Gaza, among them religious Muslims, seculars and Christians. Fewest people killed so far are Hamas fighters. Where is this supposed to go?" he faced criticism for his views, as people accused him of Antisemitism or terrorism sympathizing. He denied all these accusation, stating that he only defends human rights and international laws. In the same year, he moved to Beirut, just few weeks before the Israel attacked Beirut, he later wrote on Facebook "My friends in Germany asked me: Aren't you afraid of traveling to a country in the south where there is war that could reach the capital at any time? I answered them: I would love to be in any country except Germany during this war. I am not running away from dangers, but rather from cold hearts, closed eyes, and gagged mouths. Flee indifference, silence and double standards. Run away from hypocrites who pay lip service to freedom and humanity but remain silent or complicit in the first test of their humanity."

Following an intense debate with Brother Rachid, where Abdel-Samad defending the people of Gaza while condemning Hamas, and Rachid took the Israeli side, Abdel-Samad wrote "To the Muslims who are happy after my dialogue with Rashid, don't be too happy, I will not stop criticizing Islam or any ideology that is against human freedom. To the Christians who insult me because I didn't say what they wanted, I would like to say: Consider me your enemy and love me, guys, or is this just preaching talk and that's it? To the secularists who think that abandoning Islam necessarily means turning a blind eye to the injustice done to Muslims, I would like to say: If your secularism makes you forget your humanity, wrap up your secularism and put it in your pocket because it is useless. To anyone who expects me to say what is on his mind, I would like to say: I do not stand where I stand. I am a river that flows and changes its waters every moment, because life is in constant motion, and if you were not a river like me, you would never understand me."

On 4 April 2025, Abdel-Samad posted on Facebook, accusing Israel of committing genocide in Gaza: "There is only one word to describe what is currently happening in Gaza: genocide. For months, the people there have been mercilessly bombed... 90 percent of their homes are destroyed or uninhabitable. Water pipes, hospitals, schools, and other infrastructure have been systematically destroyed." He called for an end to the genocide, stating, "I have always sharply criticized Islamist terror and will continue to do so... But I cannot look at myself in the mirror if I remain silent about the injustice being done to civilians in Gaza." He added, "If we accept that civilians, women, and children are killed daily, then we shouldn’t be surprised if the response is more violence," concluding that he was "ready to bear all consequences" despite potential censorship by Facebook. This statement attracted significant criticism. In an article titled "From Ally to Accuser: Hamed Abdel-Samad," published on 6 April 2025 in The Times of Israel, journalist Michael Kuenne called the accusation "intellectually bankrupt" and "morally vile," arguing that it "spits on the graves of Holocaust victims and trivializes the very concept of genocide." Kuenne described Abdel-Samad’s shift from a critic of Islamism to an accuser of Israel as a "moral suicide" and a betrayal of his earlier principles.

== Publications ==
=== In English translation ===
- Hamed Abdel-Samad: Islamic Fascism, Prometheus Books, New York 2016, ISBN 978-1633881242

=== In German ===
- Hamed Abdel-Samad: Mohamed – Eine Abrechnung ("Muhammad – A final reckoning"), Droemer Knaur Verlag, Munich 2015, ISBN 978-3-426-27640-2
- Hamed Abdel-Samad: Krieg oder Frieden – Die arabische Revolution und die Zukunft des Westens ("War or peace – The Arab revolution and the future of the West"), Dromer Knaur Verlag, Munich 2011, ISBN 978-3-426-27558-0
- Hamed Abdel-Samad: Der Untergang der islamischen Welt – Eine Prognose ("The downfall of the Islamic world – A prognosis"), Droemer Knaur Verlag, Munich 2010, ISBN 978-3-426-27544-3
- Hamed Abdel-Samad: Mein Abschied vom Himmel – Aus dem Leben eines Muslims in Deutschland ("My farewell to heaven – From the life of a Muslim in Germany"), Droemer Knaur Verlag, Munich 2010, ISBN 978-3-426-78408-2
