= Abdelilah Belkziz =

Abdelilah Belkeziz (Arabic: عبد الإله بلقزيز) is a contemporary Moroccan thinker who holds a PhD in philosophy from Mohammed V University in Rabat. He serves as the secretary-general of the Moroccan-Arab Forum in Rabat and was formerly the director of studies at the Center for Arab Unity Studies in Beirut. He has published hundreds of articles in several Arab newspapers, including Al Khaleej, Al-Hayat, As-Safir, and An-Nahar.

== Books ==
He has authored more than sixty books, which cover topics in philosophy, Islam, Arab thought, and political thought. Some of his notable works include: Criticism of Western Culture: On Orientalism and Eurocentrism (2017),Towards Critical Islamism 1: The Religious and the Secular - A Critique of Mediation and Priesthood (2018),The Political Community and Citizenship (2020), In the State: Philosophical Origins (2020), and Towards Critical Islamism 2: Authority in Islam - A Comparative View of Judaism and Christianity (2023).

== Awards ==
Belkeziz has been recognized for his contributions, winning the Morocco Book Award in 2009 and 2014, as well as the Sultan Qaboos Award for Culture, Arts and Literature in 2013 for his body of intellectual work.
