= Mahmoud al-Rahbi =

Omani novelist and storyteller

- Born: 1969; Suroor Village, Oman
- Education: M.A. in Arabic Literature; M.A. in Mass Communication
- Occupation(s): Novelist, Storyteller
- Years active: 1998- oresent

Mahmoud al-Rahbi (Arabic: محمود الرحبي) is an Omani novelist and storyteller who was born in 1969. He is the author of over seven story collections including ‘A Swing Over Two Periods of Time’ which ranked in the top position in ‘The Cultural Dubai Award’ in 2009, and ‘Noon Hour’ which won ‘Sultan Qaboos Award for Culture, Arts, and Literature’ in 2012. He, as well, has published four novels including ‘The Stranger’s Leaves’.

== Biography ==
Mohmoud al-Rahbi is an Omani novelist and storyteller, who was born in 1969 in Suroor village, Oman. He moved to Morocco to pursue higher education and studied Ijazh in Arabic Literature there. He holds an M.A. in Arabic Literature from Mohammed V University of Rabat and an M.A. in Mass Communication from Tunisia.

During his stay in Rabat, Al-Rahbi had the opportunity to attend several programs and lectures delivered by Mahmoud Darwish, Nizar Qabbani, Roger Garaudy, Jacques Berque, and others.

Al-Rahbi started his writing career when he was staying in Rabat, as the Sudanese sociologist Ibrahim Haider encouraged him to publish his story in Al-Quds Al-Arabi newspaper. The newspaper has published some of Al-Rahbi's stories including ‘The Brown Colour’, a story collection, published in 1998. Through this story collection Al-Rahbi began his actual literary career.

Al-Rahbi writs both stories and novels. Up to date, he has published more than seven story collections and some of them were translated into other languages. ‘Three Mountain Stories’ is al-Rahbi's most recent story collection which was published in 2020 by ‘The Omani Society For Writers and Literates’ in collaboration with ‘Alaan Publishers and Distributors’. He has, also, published four novels including ‘The Stranger’s Leaves’ and ‘The Dreamer’s Map’. Al-Rahbi's writings are greatly inspired by the Omani environment. He, additionally, connects reality with Fantasia and Surrealism, using simple language facilitate comprehension.

He Has won several literary awards including ‘Sultan Qaboos Award for Culture, Arts, and Literature’ for his story collection ‘The Noon Hour’ in 2012. Moreover, in 2009, ‘A Swing Over Two Periods of Time’ won The Cultural Dubai Award and ranked on the top position. Al-rahbi was, also, nominated for Al Multaqa Prize For Arabic Short Story shortlist twice, for ‘It Wasn't Just A Laughter’ in 2017 and for ‘The Scream Of Munch’ in 2019.

== Works ==
=== Story Collections ===
Some of Al-Rahbi's story collections are:

- The Brown Colour (Original title: Al-Lawn Al-Bonny), 1998
- Oblivion Lake (Original title: Birkkat Al-Nissyan), 2006
- A Swing Over Two Periods of Time (Original title: Aurjoha Fawqa Zamanain), 2011
- The Scream of Munch (Original title: Sarkhat Munch), 2017
- Three Mountain Stories (Original title: Thalathu Qissasin Jabalia), 2020

=== Novel ===
- Al-Rahbi's has four novels including:
- The Dreamer's Map (Original title: Kharitat Al-Halim), 2010
- The Stranger's Leaves (Original title: Awraq Al-Ghareeb), 2017

== Awards ==
Al-Rahbi has won several literary awards including:

- ‘Sultan Qaboos Award for Culture, Arts, and Literature’ for his story collection ‘The Noon Hour’ in 2012.
- 'Best Story' in Muscat International Book Fair for 'Why Don't You Joke with Me?' in 2008.
- The Cultural Dubai Award (Top 1) for his story collection ‘A Swing Over Two Periods of Time’, in 2009.

== Nominations ==
- Al Multaqa Prize For Arabic Short Story shortlist for ‘It Was Not Just A Laughter’, in 2017.
- Al Multaqa Prize For Arabic Short Story shortlist for ‘The Scream Of Munch’ in 2019.
