= SA Parliament =

SA Parliament may refer to:

- Parliament of Saudi Arabia, known as the Consultative Assembly of Saudi Arabia
- Parliament of South Africa
- Parliament of South Australia
