= 23 Years =

Book by Ali Dashti

Twenty Three Years: A Study of the Prophetic Career of Mohammad
- Author: Ali Dashti
- Translators: F. R. C. Bagley; F. R. Bagley
- Publisher: Mazda Publishers (English)
- Publication date: c. 1973
- Publication place: Iran
- English publication date: 1985?
- Pages: 228
- ISBN: 978-1-56859-029-5

23 Years: A Study of the Prophetic Career of Mohammad is a biographical book on the life of Muhammad written by Iranian author and scholar Ali Dashti. Although completed in 1973, the book was published anonymously in Beirut, Lebanon in 1974. The book is banned in Iran.

Following the Iranian Revolution (1979), Dashti, then in his mid‑eighties, was arrested, imprisoned, and sentenced to death by Islamic Revolutionary Court for writing this critical work on Islam.

The book contains criticism of the Quran

== Publication ==
The first part of 23 Years was serialized in issue 47 of Kaveh magazine, published in Munich in 1973. At the author’s request, his name was not mentioned, but in that article Javad Vahabzadeh introduced the work and provided clues that allowed readers to identify the author as Ali Dashti. The serialization continued through issue 58 (June 1975), after which the book was published independently in Lebanon. The work was later translated into English by F. R. C. Begley. According to Houshang Moinzadeh, discussions about the book’s content were held at Ali Dashti’s home, and Dashti sought assistance from Alinaqi Monzavi, an Islamic scholar and writer who had fled Iran for Beirut for political reasons. The book circulated widely and became a major factor in the difficulties Dashti faced during the last decade of his life. According to journalist Masʿud Behnoud, Dashti, then aged 80, was sentenced to death by the Islamic Revolutionary Court for authoring 23 Years. After the Iranian Revolution, others, including Monzavi, were also imprisoned partly in connection with this book.

== Contents ==
In 23 Years, Ali Dashti presents a rationalist interpretation of Islamic prophecy and offers one of the most critical analyses of Muhammad’s life and message. According to Dashti, Muhammad’s experience of revelation was the voice of his own conscience rather than a supernatural event, and his prophetic mission can be explained through modern psychology and sociology. Dashti rejects the doctrine of Muhammad’s infallibility and accepts accounts such as the so‑called “Satanic Verses” episode. He argues that the Quran should be regarded as the book of Muhammad rather than the word of God, noting what he describes as grammatical flaws and diverse sources, which he considers expected from an illiterate man. For Dashti, the Quran’s significance lies in its impact rather than in any literary miracle, comparing its untranslatable style to the poetry of Hafez. Dashti places blame on Arab culture for what he sees as many of Islam’s problems, particularly those associated with contemporary Arab Islamism. He writes that the Arabs retained materialism, resistance to abstract thought, and rebelliousness after adopting Islam. He regards organized religion as a force that often weakens reason, though he argues there is no inherent reason it must do so. Dashti maintains that if Muhammad is understood as fully human, then his actions can be seen as responses to psychological and social conditions rather than divine directives. He asserts that Muhammad sometimes acted according to expediency rather than spiritual or moral principles, and that certain rulings and rituals from his time, such as aspects of the Hajj, have become irrelevant in the modern era. On Muhammad’s multiple marriages and their references in the Quran, Dashti writes that “every reader of the Quran should be amazed to encounter these personal matters in the scripture and the code of ethics that is valid for all humanity at all times.”

Dashti is a strong critic of writers who interpret events in Muhammad’s life and the Quran through miracles. Instead, he emphasizes the psychological and sociological factors that, in his view, shaped Muhammad’s effort to establish a complex religion and a state. Dashti argues that the Quran originated from Muhammad’s own creative genius rather than divine revelation. While he does not deny the existence of God, he contends that God is too transcendent to be concerned with the Prophet’s personal affairs, including those of his wives, companions, and enemies. Dashti portrays Muhammad as a man with both virtues and weaknesses, subject to strong emotions and human limitations, yet generally worthy of reverence and superior to his contemporaries. 23 Years treats the Prophet with respect and even seeks to honor him, though Dashti criticizes the growth of myths and miraculous accounts surrounding Muhammad over the centuries. He also rejects many Western misconceptions about Muhammad, particularly those from the Middle Ages.

The book is organized into several main sections:

- Mohammad;
- Islam;
- Politics;
- Metaphysics;
- After Muhammad

== Criticism ==
Since the publication of 23 Years, a number of rebuttals have appeared, including Betrayal in the Report of History by Seyyed Mostafa Hosseini Tabataba’i and The Great Secret of the Prophethood by Ja‘far Sobhani. Both authors raise objections to Dashti’s arguments and accuse him of misquoting and misrepresenting sources. Tabataba’i in particular criticizes Dashti for lacking a basic knowledge of Arabic, questioning how someone unfamiliar with the language could comment on the Quran. As an example, he cites Dashti’s interpretation of a verse from Surah Ash-Shu'ara (26:198), arguing that Dashti’s translation is misleading. Tabataba’i’s rebuttal is noted for its harsh tone and personal attacks, which, according to researcher Paul Sparkman, reflect elements of religious fanaticism in Iran at the time. Sparkman also observes that 23 Years contains typographical errors and minor inaccuracies that, while not central to Dashti’s thesis, have been used by critics such as Tabataba’i to challenge Dashti’s credibility. Sparkman further acknowledges that Dashti did not always provide precise citations for commentators, historians, and hadiths, even though the work remains a serious and scholarly effort.

By questioning why the capacity for evil exists in human nature, Dashti challenges the need for a divine messenger. He notes that theologians claim God did not create evil, but that humans possess a nature capable of both good and evil. Dashti asks: “Who gave these people this nature in which there is the possibility of both evil and good?” He argues that a person’s character is fixed at birth and unaffected by individual will, stating that “black people cannot be whitened by preaching,” and concludes that prophecy is therefore unnecessary.

Tabataba’i argues that Dashti contradicts himself elsewhere in 23 Years. For example, Dashti writes: “The miracle of Muhammad is that he did not sit idly by and resisted all the insults and persecutions, and did not turn away from any plan to impose Islam on the Arabian Peninsula, to bring the different tribes of the Arabs under one brigade, who are completely alien to supernatural affairs and who turn to the senses according to their primitive nature and have no other goal than to gain immediate benefit, except to encroach on the wishes of others. It is not made of them.”

In his review of 23 Years, Jay Norder attributes the book’s popularity and repeated reproduction to the controversy it provoked. He describes the work as a direct attempt to demythologize the prophethood of Muhammad and to return to early historical sources such as Ibn Ishaq and Tarikh al‑Tabari. Norder considers Dashti well qualified to produce such a study because of his seminary background and strong command of the Arabic language.

According to Brigitte Hoffmann, a professor of Islamic studies at the University of Bamberg, 23 Years is a well‑researched and readable book. She notes that although it has been widely circulated in Iran, from a scholarly perspective it does not offer any new interpretation of Muhammad’s life.

In an article published in Journal of the Middle East in 1987, Hamed Elgar observed that Dashti’s approach in 23 Years was to reduce the Prophet to one of many great historical figures. Elgar points out that Dashti even compares the Prophet to Lenin, suggesting that Lenin was “more sour” (p. 8). Elgar writes that Dashti interprets the spread of Islam as “a response to the social conditions of Mecca” (p. 195). According to Elgar, Dashti reduces the narrative of Muhammad and his companions to a story of “violence and greed, or unrest and confusion.” Elgar also argues that the book’s tone recalls older Orientalist narratives and includes sharp racial generalizations, portraying Arabs, both before and after Islam, as “wild and unintelligent” (p. 195).

Ahmad Sadri has described 23 Years as a work containing insults toward sacred beliefs and unjust accusations against the Prophet of Islam. He interprets the limited questioning and release of Dashti after the book’s publication as evidence of some tolerance for rational critique of Islam among Muslims. By contrast, Saʿidi Sirjani reported that Dashti suffered severe mistreatment in prison, claiming that he was tortured and even sustained a pelvic injury while incarcerated.

== See also ==
- Criticism of Islam
- Criticism of Muhammad
- Criticism of the Quran
- List of critics of Islam
