= Saad Albazei =

Saudi scholar, literary critic, translator, and intellectual

Saad Abdulrahman Albazei (Arabic: سعد عبد الرحمن البازعي), born 1953, is a Saudi scholar, literary critic, translator, and intellectual. He is known for his comparative studies of Arabic literature and his analysis of East–West cultural relations. Albazei has served as a professor of English and Comparative Literature at King Saud University and has been a member of the Consultative Assembly of Saudi Arabia (Shura Council).

== Early life and education ==
Albazei was born in Saudi Arabia in 1953. He earned a bachelor’s degree in English Language and Literature from King Saud University in 1974. He obtained his master’s degree in English Literature from Purdue University in 1978 and completed his Ph.D. in English and American Literature at Purdue in 1983, where his dissertation focused on literary Orientalism in Western literatures.

== Career ==
=== Academic roles ===
Albazei began his career as a professor of English and Comparative Literature at the Department of English, King Saud University, Riyadh, in 1984. He served as editor-in-chief of the 30-volume Global Arabic Encyclopedia, as well as editor-in-chief of the English-language newspaper Riyadh Daily. From 2006 to 2010, he was president of the Riyadh Literary Club, a major cultural institution in the Saudi capital.

=== Shura Council ===
In 2009, Albazei joined the Consultative Assembly of Saudi Arabia (Shura Council), an appointed parliamentary body. He retired from his full-time academic position at King Saud University, though he continued to write and lecture on cultural and literary topics.

=== Cultural and intellectual contributions ===
Over the years, Albazei has lectured and participated in conferences in multiple countries, including the USA, Japan, Poland, Germany, the UK, France, Spain, and several Arab states such as the UAE, Bahrain, Oman, Kuwait, Egypt, Algeria, and Tunisia. He addressed a 2009 UNESCO conference on languages in Paris.

In 2014, he chaired the judging panel for the International Prize for Arabic Fiction (Arabic Booker Prize). In March 2024, he was appointed a member of the Board of Directors of the Saudi Literature, Publishing and Translation Commission, and in July 2024, he became President of the “Golden Pen Award” for the most influential literary work.

== Theoretical perspectives ==
=== Cultural Hegemony and the Anxiety of Power ===
In his analysis of cultural hegemony and power, Saad Albazei posits that culture is not merely an expression of collective identity or a means of communication but rather a field of struggle and negotiation among different forces, each seeking to impose its own vision of the world. This struggle is particularly evident in intercultural relations, where dominant powers engage in the production of knowledge and the establishment of norms regarding what is deemed “acceptable” or “unacceptable” in the global cultural sphere. Meanwhile, other cultures attempt to resist this centralization through various strategies, ranging from adaptation and negotiation to outright confrontation.

Albazei also asserts that cultural power is not confined to political or economic structures alone but extends to language, knowledge, and discursive representations. The hegemonic forces continuously reshape the consciousness of subjugated societies in ways that render them more receptive to their dominance. As a result, cultural hegemony can be even more pervasive than military or economic control, as it infiltrates the cognitive structures of collective identity, compelling societies to perceive themselves through the lens of the dominant other.

Nevertheless, Albazei does not perceive the relationship between cultural hegemony and subordinate societies as one of absolute submission. He maintains that there are always spaces for resistance and renegotiation. Even in moments where Western or other cultural hegemonies appear to be at their peak, alternative epistemological models emerge, challenging the prevailing discourse and offering new frameworks for knowledge production. Within this context, he reexamines how peripheral cultures can engage with the center without falling into dependency, or alternatively, reject it without succumbing to intellectual isolation.

=== Epistemological Interactions and Cultural Negotiation ===
Albazei argues that Arab intellectual engagement with Western modernity goes beyond the conventional dichotomy of total assimilation or absolute rejection. He contends that the reception of Western thought in the Arab intellectual sphere has been complex and non-linear, oscillating between admiration for Western scientific and intellectual achievements and profound criticism of its colonial and hegemonic dimensions. Rather than reducing Western modernity to a mere imperialist tool, Albazei highlights its epistemological dimensions, emphasizing that it encompasses knowledge systems and methodologies that can be reinterpreted and adapted within the Arab intellectual context, provided that this process is critical and selective rather than passive and imitative.

Albazei critiques certain Arab intellectual currents that have adopted a rigidly antagonistic stance toward Western thought without distinguishing between its colonial aspects and its intellectual contributions. He asserts that criticism should be epistemological rather than ideological, meaning that it should involve rigorous analysis and deconstruction of Western intellectual paradigms rather than their outright rejection simply because they originate in the West. Furthermore, he argues that modernity should not be seen as a ready-made model for adoption but as a flexible and adaptable process that can be incorporated in ways that preserve Arab intellectual identity while benefiting from its productive aspects.

One common misconception, according to Albazei, is the assumption that Western thought is a monolithic entity. In reality, Western intellectual traditions exhibit significant internal diversity, including critical schools of thought that challenge the foundations of modernity and colonialism. Drawing on postmodern critiques—such as those advanced by Foucault, Habermas, and Baudrillard—he encourages Arab intellectuals to adopt a more dynamic process of epistemological negotiation that moves beyond reactive rejection or uncritical acceptance.

=== Differences and Cultural Interaction ===
In his reading of cultural difference, Albazei does not treat it merely as a social phenomenon or as the result of multiple identities but rather as an epistemological framework that reshapes the relationship between self and other, as well as between culture and identity. Difference is not simply a superficial contrast but a foundational structure of knowledge itself, since no awareness of the self can be produced without recognizing the existence of a different other.

Albazei deconstructs cultural discourse that presents identity as homogeneous and fixed, arguing that such perceptions are often exclusionary tools used to reinforce hegemonic narratives. He contends that difference is not something to be overcome or eliminated but an essential condition for the existence of culture. Moreover, difference is evident not only between cultures but also within each society, where internal epistemological and ideological diversity manifests through discursive struggles and multiple modes of understanding. This dynamic process continuously reshapes identity and fosters a dialogical negotiation that transcends a simple binary of center and periphery.

=== Concept Migration ===
Albazei examines the transfer of ideas and concepts between cultures as a fundamental process in the reshaping of knowledge. He argues that concepts do not emerge in isolation; they are historical and cultural constructs that undergo translation, modification, and reinterpretation when introduced into new intellectual contexts. This “migration” is not a mere transfer but an epistemological reproduction where concepts are redefined in response to new social, political, or intellectual needs.

He maintains that concept migration is influenced by power dynamics and hegemony. Some cultures exert greater influence in imposing their conceptual frameworks, while others find themselves in positions of reception or resistance. Albazei highlights that even concepts originating in modern Europe—such as deconstruction, postmodernism, and cultural criticism—are reinterpreted in the Arab world to align with local intellectual and political concerns. He raises a key question: to what extent can concepts retain their original identity when transferred, and when do they transform into something entirely new?

=== Narrative Orientalism and the Reproduction of the East in the Western Imagination ===
Albazei argues that literature is not merely a medium for aesthetic expression but a space where cultural representations are produced and hegemonic narratives reproduced. He introduces the concept of “narrative Orientalism,” which posits that Orientalism manifests in the way the East is represented within Western literary texts. This process transforms these representations into an epistemological framework that defines the nature of the East–West relationship.

For example, Albazei observes that One Thousand and One Nights was not simply transmitted as a shared literary heritage but was reconfigured in the West as a tool for constructing an exotic, fantastical image of the East. Instead of being engaged with as a complex historical text, it was absorbed into Western literature as a symbol of exoticism and deviation from rational norms. Thus, Albazei suggests that such literary works are deconstructed and reassembled to serve an Orientalist discourse, perpetuating traditional hegemonic frameworks.

=== Desert Modernity ===
In his theorization of the relationship between modernity and the desert, Albazei reexamines the dominant framework of modernity—which has long been understood as an urban model rooted in the Western experience—and proposes an alternative perspective. He argues that the desert, both geographically and symbolically, can contribute to the formation of modernity rather than standing in opposition to it. Through his concept of "desert modernity," Albazei challenges the conventional separation between the desert and modernity, asserting that the desert is a dynamic site of cultural and intellectual production.

He contends that the desert is not merely a geographical reality but a semantic field that shapes cultural consciousness. This is particularly evident in the Gulf region, where rapid urbanization and oil-driven development create a paradox: modern infrastructures coexist with traditional cultural identities. Albazei illustrates how modern poetry and fiction repurpose the desert—not as a symbol of backwardness, but as an integral component of a unique, locally-derived modernity that negotiates between heritage and contemporary transformation.

== Works ==
He has published extensively on Arabic literature, including several volumes of literary criticism and cultural analysis. His book Languages of Poetry: Poems and Readings won the Saudi Ministry of Culture’s Book of the Year Prize in 2011. He also edited the second edition of the 30-volume Global Arabic Encyclopedia.

=== Selected publications in English ===
- "Tension in the House: The Contemporary Poetry of Arabia," World Literature Today (Spring, 2001), University of Oklahoma.
- "Minority Concerns: Female Scholars at the Cultural Intersection," in Neither East Nor West: Postcolonial Essays on Literature, Culture and Religion, Stockholm: Södertörn University (2008).
- "Enlightened Tensions: Jewish Haskalah and Arab-Muslim Nahda," in Simon Dubnow Institute Yearbook, Göttingen: Vandenhoeck & Ruprecht (2008).
- "The Orientalist Discourse in Anglo-American Literary Criticism," Alef journal, 9, (1989), American University in Cairo.
- "Realms of the Wasteland: Hijazi and the Metropolis," World Literature Today, University of Oklahoma (Spring, 1993) 67:2.
- "Elegies Within Culture: Auden and Abu Risha," in Comparative Literature In the Arab World, Centre for Comparative Linguistics and Literary Studies, Faculty of Arts, Cairo University (1995).
- "Books and Terror: Anxieties of the Infinite in Wordsworth, Borges and Stevens," The Arab Journal for the Humanities, Kuwait University (Autumn 1997), no. 60.
- "Tension in the House: The Contemporary Poetry of Arabia," World Literature Today (Spring, 2001) 75:2.

A forthcoming volume is Cultural Encounters: Essays on Literature and Culture (in English).

=== Publications in Arabic ===
- Thaqāfat al-Ṣaḥrā (Desert Culture), 1991.
- Dalīl al-Nāqid al-Adabī (A Guide for the Literary Critic), 2002.
- Shurufāt lil-Ruʾyah (Outposts for Vision: on identity, globalization, and cultural interaction), 2004.
- Al-Mukawwin al-Yahūdī fī al-Ḥaḍārah al-Gharbiyyah (The Jewish Component in Western Civilization), 2007.
- Al-Ikhtilāf al-Thaqāfī wa Thaqāfat al-Ikhtilāf (Cultural Difference and the Culture of Difference), 2008.
- Sard al-Mudun: fī al-Riwāyah wa al-Sīnimā (Cities Narrative: Fiction and Cinema), 2009.
- Qalaq al-Ma‘rifah (The Anxiety of Knowledge): Thought and Culture Issues (2010).
- Lughāt al-Shi‘r (Languages of Poetry): Poems and Readings (2011).
- Mashāghil al-Naṣ wa Ishtighāl al-Qirā’ah (Preoccupations of the Text and the Workings of Reading) (2014).
- Muwājahāt Thaqāfiyyah/Cultural Encounters (Arabic and English Texts) (2014).
- Humūm al-‘Aql (Concerns of the Mind) (2016).
- Jadal al-Ulfah wa al-Gharābah (The Dialectic of Familiarity and Strangeness) (2016).
- Muwājahāt al-Sulṭah (Confrontations of Power) (2018).
- Maṣāʾir al-Riwāyah (The Fates of the Novel) (2020).
- al-Faraḥ al-Mukhtalas: Rahān al-Shi‘r (Stolen Joy: The Stakes of Poetry) (2020).
- Hirāt al-Mafāhīm (Migration of Concepts) (2021).
- Suʾāl al-Ma‘nā fī al-Amākin wa al-Funūn (The Question of Meaning in Places and the Arts) (2021).
- al-Thaqāfah fī Zamān al-Jā’iḥah (Culture in the Time of the Pandemic) (2022).
- Maʿālim al-Ḥadāthah (Landmarks of Modernity) (2022).

=== Translations into Arabic ===
- Muslims in American History: A Forgotten Legacy by Jerald Dirks (2011).
- Globalectics by Ngũgĩ wa Thiong’o (2014).
- Ethics in a Time of Liquid Modernity by Zygmunt Bauman, co-translated with Buthayna Al-Ibrahim (2016).
- Bumgartner by Paul Auster (2023).

== Awards and honors ==
- Saudi Ministry of Culture’s Book of the Year Prize (2011) for Languages of Poetry: Poems and Readings.
- Sultan Qaboos Award for Culture, Arts and Literature (2017) in the field of literary criticism.
- Bahrain’s Annual Book Award (2018) for Humūm al-‘Aql (Concerns of the Mind).
- Cultural Personality of the Year at the 46th Kuwait International Book Fair (2023).
- Honored by the Doha Book Award for Arabic Books (2024).
