= Mohammed bin Ali Al Fayez =

Saudi politician (1937–2025)

- محمد بن علي الفايز
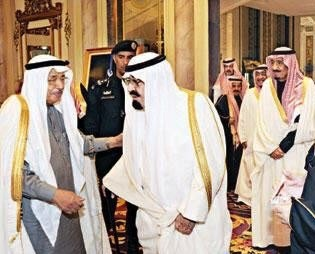
- Al Fayez in 2013

Minister of Civil Service
- In office 15 June 1999 – 14 December 2011
- Preceded by: position established
- Succeeded by: Abdulrahman bin Abdullah Al Barrak

Personal details
- Born: 1937; Ḥaʼil, Saudi Arabia
- Died: 16 April 2025 (aged 87–88)
- Education: Cairo University (LLB); University of Southern California (MS)
- Occupation: Lawyer

Mohammed bin Ali Al Fayez (Arabic: محمد بن علي الفايز; 1937 – 16 April 2025) was a Saudi politician. He served as Minister of Civil Service from 1999 to 2011.

Al Fayez died on 16 April 2025.
