= Al Hayat TV =

- قناة الحياة
- Genre: Religious broadcasting

Production
- Production location: Cyprus

Original release
- Release: 2003

Alhayat TV, also known as Life TV (Arabic: قناة الحياة), is an evangelical Christian Arabic-language television channel that airs in countries in North Africa, West Asia, the Middle East, America, Canada, Australia and some of Europe.

== History ==
The channel was founded in Cyprus in 2003 by Al Hayat Ministries, an evangelical organization.

== Programs ==
Al Hayat TV broadcasts programs designed by different Christian ministries. One of his most famous programs is Daring Question, hosted by Brother Rachid and broadcast live Joyce Meyer has programs translated into Arabic.

== Controversies ==
Alhayat TV became controversial for content that is heavily critical of Islam. Its programs are much debated and sometimes the subject of angry criticism from Muslims who claim that Alhayat's content is biased and inaccurate.

Zakaria Botros, a Coptic Orthodox Egyptian-born priest who was twice arrested by Arab authorities, is often cited for his bold tone and exposition of contradictions he perceives in Islam. In 2010, he was expelled from al-Hayat due to threats of violence from radical Muslims.

Al-Azhar expressed concerns over the broadcasting of Alhayat TV, saying that the Coptic channel was offensive to Muslims and Islam.

== See also ==
- Zakaria Botros
