= Mody Al-Khalaf =

Saudi Arabian diplomat

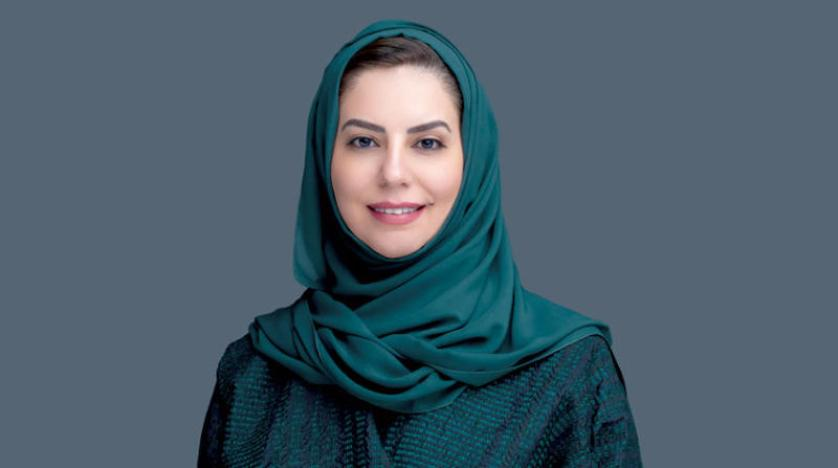

Member of the Consultative Assembly of Saudi Arabia
- In office December 2016 – 2020

Personal details
- Education: Princess Nora bint Abdul Rahman University; Stanford University

Mody Al-Khalaf is a Saudi diplomat and academic who was a member of the Consultative Assembly of Saudi Arabia from December 2016 to 2020. She is the first Saudi female diplomat to hold the position of assistant attaché at the Saudi Cultural Attaché in United States, which is the highest diplomatic position for a Saudi woman in the Kingdom's attachés abroad.

== Education ==
Al-Khalaf was born in Saudi Arabia. She completed her PhD in Applied Linguistics with a specialization in Computational linguistics from Princess Nora bint Abdul Rahman University in 2007.

== Career ==
Al-Khalaf was appointed as director of Cultural and Social Affairs, cultural attaché, Embassy of the Kingdom of Saudi Arabia, Washington from 2008 to 2012.

She served as a member of the Saudi Shura Council from 2016 to 2020.

She has served as secretary general at Princess Nourah Bint Abdulrahman University 2021–2022.

She is a supporter of women's rights and has authored writings addressing various topics in both English and Arabic languages.

== Personal life ==
Al-Khalaf is the founder of a Saudi restaurant, Aldeerah, in Virginia.

== See also ==
- Consultative Assembly of Saudi Arabia
