= The Fall of the Islamic World =

Book by Hamed Abdel-Samad

The Fall of the Islamic World: A forecast (ISBN 9789025437398, original German title: Der Untergang der islamischen Welt: Eine Prognose, ISBN 9783426275443) is a book from 2010 by the German-Egyptian political scientist and Islam critic Hamed Abdel-Samad.

In the book Abdel-Samad claims Islam is over its peak. He states that the root cause of Islam's decline is that contemporary Muslims do consume the material achievements of modern society, but on a spiritual plane they are not open to modern concepts such as freedom, equality and religious criticism. He argues that Muslims in the West are largely financially economically dependent on Western social order but despise the underlying moral values. As a result, he says, the gap between Islam and modern society grows and Islam loses its relevance. Adbel-Samad proposes a solution in what he called a "post-Koran discourse", a religious-ethnical Islamic revival, but not literally on the Qu'ran word.
