= Khawla Al-Kuraya =

Saudi physician and cancer specialist

- خولة بنت سامي الكريع
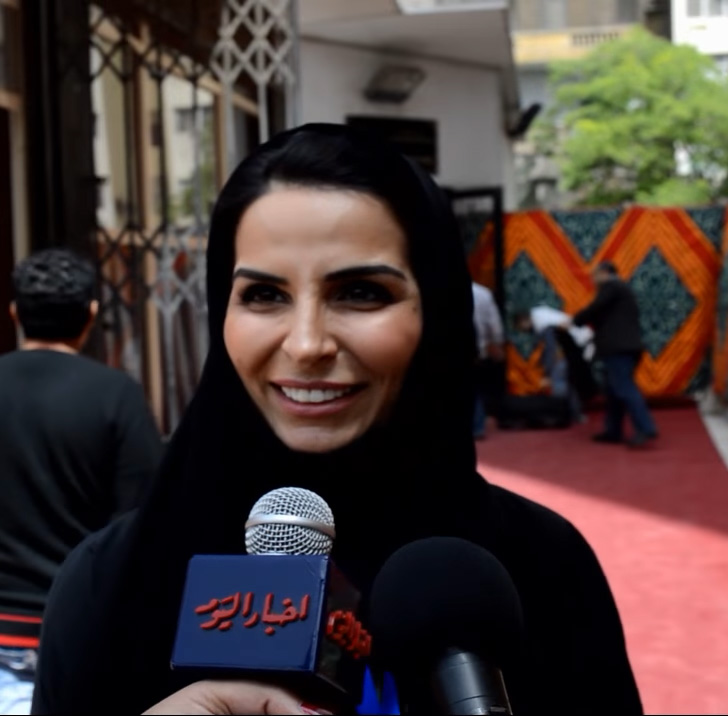
- Born: 1973 (age 52–53)

Khawla S. Al-Kuraya (Arabic: خولة بنت سامي الكريع, romanized: Khawlah bint Sāmī al-Kurayyīʻ; 1973 –) is a Saudi physician and cancer specialist. She is a professor of pathology and is director of Human Cancer Genome Research at the King Fahad National Center for Children's Cancer and Research in Riyadh.

Al-Kuraya was born in the Al Jawf Region of Saudi Arabia. She was admitted to King Saud University in Riyadh and earned her MD in general surgery and medicine. She completed her residency in clinical pathology in Washington D.C. at Georgetown University Hospital. She then completed a fellowship in molecular diagnostics and hematopathology at the National Cancer Institute.

Al-Kuraya has published research on the FOXM1 gene which plays a role in cancer formation.

For her cancer research Al-Kuraya was awarded the Order of Abdulaziz al Saud in 2010. She was the first Saudi woman to receive the award. Saudi newspapers and television depicted King Abdullah shaking her hand and placing the medal around her neck. The public display of proximity to an unrelated woman was unprecedented at the time.

She was among 30 women who in 2013 were appointed by King Abdullah to the Consultative Assembly of Saudi Arabia, an advisory body that proposes laws.
