= Alia Al-Dahlawi =

Alia Muhammad Ali Al-Dahlawi

Member of the Consultative Assembly of Saudi Arabia
- Incumbent
- Assumed office December 2016

Personal details
- Education: King Abdulaziz University; King's College London

Alia Mohammed Ali Aldahlawi has been a Member of the Consultative Assembly of Saudi Arabia since December 2016.

She holds a bachelor's and master's degree in microbiology from King Abdulaziz University, and completed her PhD at King's College London in 2005, entitled "Interaction of legionnaire's disease bacterium with human dendritic cells".
