= Hanan Al-Ahmadi =

Saudi Arabian academic

Hanan Abdulrahim Al-Ahmadi (Arabic: حنان عبد الرحيم الأحمدي) is a Saudi Arabian academic who has been a member of the Consultative Assembly of Saudi Arabia since 2013 and Assistant Speaker since October 2020. She is the first woman to hold the position and in December 2020 became the first woman to chair a session of the body.

== Early life and education ==
Al-Ahmadi is from Mecca. She graduated from King Saud University with a bachelor's degree in economics in 1986 and from the Tulane University School of Public Health and Tropical Medicine in the United States with a master's in health administration in 1989. She completed a PhD in Public Health at the University of Pittsburgh Graduate School of Public Health in 1995. Her PhD thesis was entitled Determinants of Job Satisfaction among Saudi Arabian Male and Female Physicians: A Qualitative Study.

== Career ==
Al-Ahmadi was a professor of health services administration and the director general of the women's branch of the Institute of Public Administration. She is a visiting fellow at the National Primary Care Research and Development Centre of the University of Manchester in the United Kingdom and a member of the advisory board for Social Research and Women's Studies at Princess Nora bint Abdul Rahman University.

Al-Ahmadi is a member of the board of trustees of the Riyadh Economic Forum, the Saudi Management Association, and the editorial board of the Journal of Public Administration She has also been a committee member for the Ministry of Culture and Information Book Award, Janadriyah Festival and Sheikh Khalif Award for Excellence in Governmental Performance. She has published a number of journal articles as well as a 2016 book, Patient Safety and Quality of Health Care. In 2014, she was ranked eighth on an Arabian Business list of the 30 most powerful and influential women in Saudi society.

=== Consultative Assembly ===
Al-Ahmadi was among the first group of women to be elected to the Consultative Assembly of Saudi Arabia in May 2013 after a quota of 20% was introduced. She served on the Economic and Energy Committee, the Health and Environment Affairs committee, and the Fifth Parliamentary Friendship Committee. When interviewed, she said she believed the majority of people in Saudi Arabia realised the need for the advancement of women in public life, but also noted there had been a mixed reaction to their appointment, "as expected". In October 2013, one of the women appointed, Latifa al-Shaalan proposed that the Transportation Committee should recommend that women be allowed to drive. Al-Ahmadi, who drove while she lived in the United States, said she welcomed the recommendation but would probably not drive herself even if permitted. She said, "Some who are more courageous than me might do it. But it is not an easy thing."

Al-Ahmadi was appointed Assistant Speaker of the Assembly in October 2020 by royal decree of King Salman, as part of a restructure of the Assembly to reflect the kingdom's commitment to reform and openness, which drew criticism from supporters of the Sururi and the Muslim Brotherhood. Al-Ahmadi's is the third highest position of the body and she is the first woman to assume a leadership position in the body. In a statement issued upon her appointment, Al-Ahmadi said, "This important position embodies the support of the Monarch and the Crown Prince for Saudi women and their keenness to activate their participation in national decision-making process and to enhance their participation in the comprehensive development that the Kingdom is witnessing in all fields."

On 2 December 2020, Al-Ahmadi became the first woman to chair a session of the Assembly, presiding over its sixth session, held online, in the absence of President Abdullah ibn Muhammad Al ash-Sheikh and Vice President Mishaal Al Sulam.

== Selected publications ==
- Alahmadi, Hanan (2002). "Job satisfaction of nurses in Ministry of Health Hospitals in Riyadh, Saudi Arabia". Saudi Medical Journal. 23 (6): 645–650. PMID 12070540.
- Al-Ahmadi, Hanan; Roland, Martin (2005). "Quality of primary health care in Saudi Arabia: a comprehensive review". International Journal for Quality in Health Care. 17 (4): 331–346. doi:10.1093/intqhc/mzi046. PMID 15883128.
- Al-Ahmadi, Hanan A. (2006). "Determinants of Nurse Turnover in Psychiatric Hospitals in Saudi Arabia". Journal of the Social Sciences. 34 (4): 73–109.
- Al-Ahmadi, Hanan (2009). "Factors affecting performance of hospital nurses in Riyadh Region, Saudi Arabia". International Journal of Health Care Quality Assurance. 22 (1): 40–54. doi:10.1108/09526860910927943. PMID 19284170.
- Al-Ahmadi, Hanan (2011). "Challenges facing women leaders in Saudi Arabia". Human Resources Development International. 14 (2): 149–166. doi:10.1080/13678868.2011.558311. S2CID 144277235.
- Al-Ahmadi, Hanan (2013). "Anticipated nurses' turnover in public hospitals in Saudi Arabia". The International Journal of Human Resource Management. 25 (3): 412–433. doi:10.1080/09585192.2013.792856. S2CID 154690789.
