= Consultative Assembly of Saudi Arabia =

Unicameral advisory body of Saudi Arabia

Consultative Assembly مجلس الشورى Majlis al-Shura
- 9th Term (2024–2028)

Type
- Type: Unicameral

History
- Established: 20 December 1924; 101 years ago 1 March 1992; 34 years ago (current form)
- New session started: 30 September 2026

Leadership
- Speaker: Abdullah ibn Muhammad, Independent since 15 February 2009
- Vice Speaker: Mishaal bin Fahm Al-Sulami, Independent since 20 October 2020
- Assistant Speaker: Hanan Al-Ahmadi, Independent since 20 October 2020
- Secretary General: Mohammed bin Dakhil Al-Mutairi, Independent since 26 February 2018

Structure
- Seats: 150
- Political groups: Nonpartisan (150)
- Committees: 15 committees
- Length of term: Up to 4 years

Elections
- Voting system: Appointment by the King
- Last election: 2 September 2024

Meeting place
- Al Yamamah Palace, Riyadh; Riyadh Province, Kingdom of Saudi Arabia

Website
- Official English Site

Constitution
- Basic Law of Saudi Arabia (Note: Although Saudi Arabia does not have a constitution in the conventional sense, the Basic Law establishes the three authorities of the state and sets out the principles of its system of government.)

The Consultative Assembly (Arabic: مجلس الشورى, romanized: Majlis al-Shura), also known as the Shura Council, is the formal advisory body of Saudi Arabia. It has the authority to propose laws and amendments, which are submitted to the King for approval. As one of the three constitutional authorities of the state, alongside the Executive and Judiciary, it nominally shares the Regulatory Authority (legislative) with the Council of Ministers, in accordance with Article 67 of the Basic Law. (Note: Article 67: The Regulatory Authority shall be concerned with the making of laws and regulations which will safeguard all interests, and remove evil from the state's affairs, according to Sharia. Its powers shall be exercised according to provisions of this Law and the Law of the Council of Ministers and the Law of the Shura Council.)

The Assembly consists of 150 members, all appointed by the King. Members are selected from among scholars, experts, and professionals, and serve four-year terms beginning with the council’s first session following a royal decree. Since 2013, the chamber has included 30 female members, following the introduction of a 20% quota for women's representation.

Originally established in 1924 as the National Council during the Sultanate of Nejd, the body was restructured and renamed the Consultative Assembly in 1992 with the promulgation of the Basic Law, marking the beginning of its modern role. It functions as a deliberative council that advises the King on matters of national importance. The Assembly is currently on its ninth term, which started with the 2024 Royal Speech.

== History ==
The first Majlis ash-Shura (Shura Council) was founded by King Abdulaziz on 13 January 1926 in the Kingdom of Hejaz and Nejd and chaired by his son, Prince Faisal. However, the complete institutionalization of the assembly was finalized in 1932. Later, it was expanded to include twenty-five members at the beginning of King Saud's reign. However, its functions were transferred to the Council of Ministers due to political pressures of the royal family members. The Council was not officially dissolved and remained ineffective until King Fahd revived it in 2000.

King Fahd decreed a new Majlis ash-Shura Law on 24 November 2000, which replaced the previous law that had been effective since 1928, and decreed the by-laws of the council and their supplements on 22 August 1993. The first term of the Council under the new law (1993–1997) had a speaker and 60 members. The membership was increased by 30 in each of the following terms: the second term 90 members (1997–2001), third term 120 members (2001–2005) and fourth term 150 members (2005–2009). Thus, the number of members increased to 150 members plus the speaker in the fourth term.

Abdullah ibn Muhammad Al ash-Sheikh with Indian Prime Minister Manmohan Singh in New Delhi, 8 May 2012

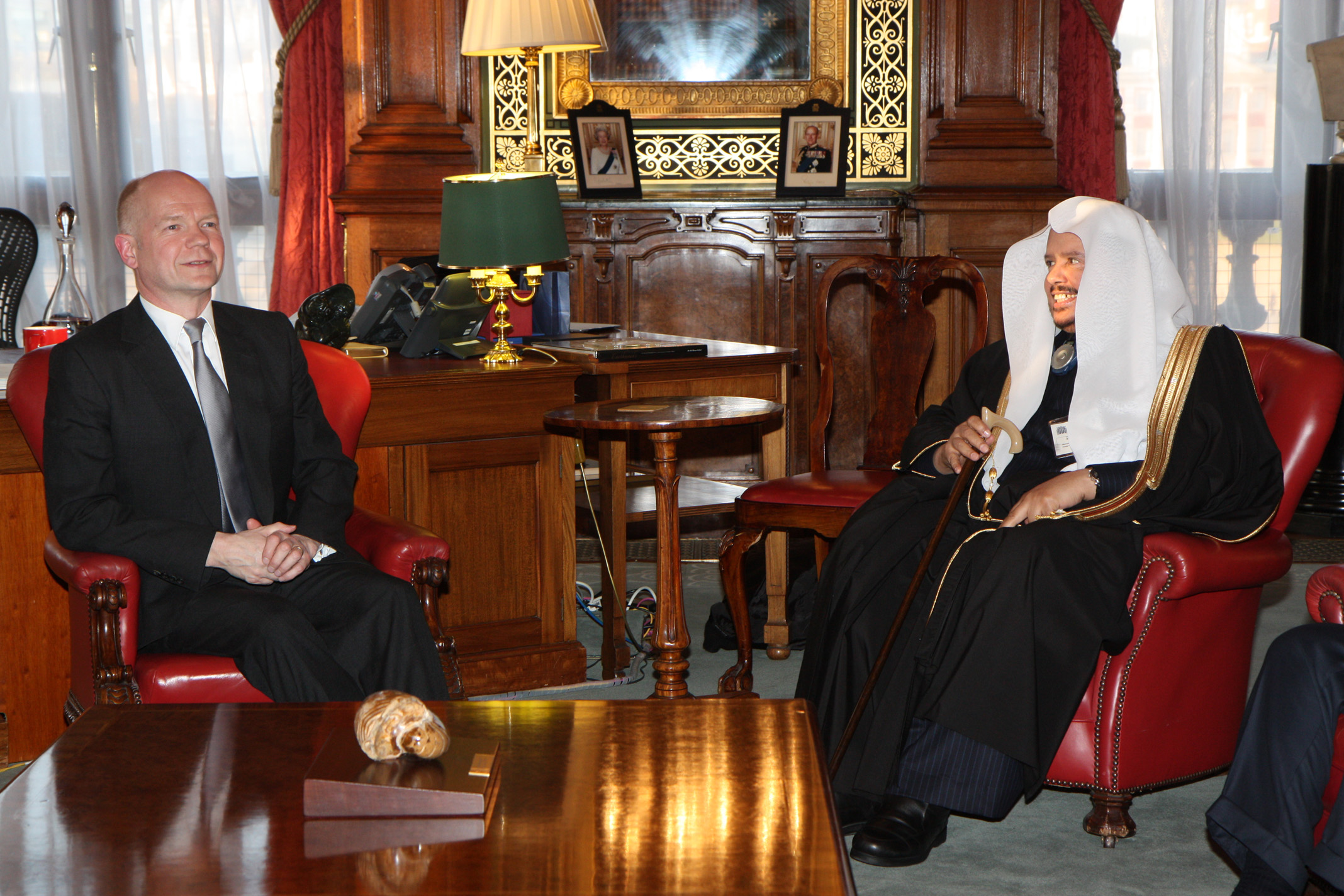
Abdullah ibn Muhammad Al ash-Sheikh with British foreign secretary William Hague in London, 5 March 2013

Having been expanded in 1997 and 2001, the council achieved a place in the Inter-Parliamentary Union by the end of 2003. The fourth term council held 845 sessions and issued 1174 declarations during its second year. In September 2011, just a few days before the 2011 municipal elections, King Abdullah stated that women may become members of the council.

In January 2013, King Abdullah issued two royal decrees, granting women thirty seats on the council, and stating that women must always hold at least a fifth of the seats on the council. According to the decrees, the female council members must be "committed to Islamic Sharia disciplines without any violations" and be "restrained by the religious veil." The decrees also said that the female council members would be entering the council building from special gates, sit in seats reserved for women and pray in special worshipping places. Earlier, officials said that a screen would separate genders and an internal communications network would allow men and women to communicate.

Women first joined the council in 2013, and three were named as deputy chairpersons of three committees: Thurayya Obeid (deputy chairwoman of the Human Rights and Petitions Committee), Zainab Abu Talib (deputy chairwoman of the Information and Cultural Committee) and Lubna Al Ansari (deputy chairwoman of the Health Affairs and Environment Committee).

== Qualifications ==
The Basic Law of Saudi Arabia outlines the qualifications required for appointment to the Consultative Assembly. A prospective member must:

1. Be a Saudi national by origin and birth;
2. Be at least 30 years of age;
3. Be known for integrity, competence, and sound judgment.

== Powers ==
The Consultative Assembly holds the authority to propose draft laws and amendments to existing legislation and submit them to the King through the Speaker. It may also suggest interpretations of laws and express opinions on general state policies referred to it by the Prime Minister (currently the Crown Prince). However, the power to enact or enforce legislation remains exclusively with the King.

Since 2004, the Assembly's mandate has been expanded to allow it to initiate legislative proposals without prior royal submission. It also reviews international treaties, agreements, and concessions before they are ratified by royal decree. Additionally, the Assembly examines annual reports submitted by ministries and government agencies, studies economic and development plans, and makes policy recommendations. It is also authorized to review the government budget and request the appearance of ministers for questioning about government performance and policy.

The Assembly is formally authorized to request documentation and data from government agencies if deemed necessary to facilitate its work. Its Speaker may submit requests to the Prime Minister for this purpose or to seek ministerial accountability. While ministers may attend Council sessions to participate in deliberations, they do not have voting power.

The influence of the Shura Council stems primarily from its advisory role in shaping the Kingdom’s five-year development plans, which inform the annual budget, its capacity to hold government officials accountable through questioning, and its function as a platform for policy discussion and debate.

== Procedure ==
=== Legislative procedures ===
The Consultative Assembly discusses draft laws and regulations in two stages. The relevant committee chairperson presents the draft law, followed by a general discussion among members regarding the principle and purpose of the proposed legislation (referred to as its "convenience"). After hearing members’ remarks, the committee responds and then a vote is held to approve the draft in principle. Following approval in principle, the draft law is examined article by article in a subsequent session. The committee responds to comments, suggestions, or questions raised by members. Votes are taken on individual articles. If needed and approved by the Speaker of the Council, discussions and voting on articles may occur in the same session.

International agreements and treaties are first reviewed by the relevant committee, then presented to the full Council for discussion. The committee may respond to members' observations and questions in the same or a later session. The Assembly then votes on the agreement as a whole. If the Council disapproves or expresses reservations about any part, it must state the reasons, which are included in the decision.

Resolutions passed by the Assembly are submitted to the King, who decides whether to refer them to the Council of Ministers. If both bodies agree, the resolution is issued following the King's approval. If there is a disagreement, the matter is returned to the Assembly for further consideration and a revised resolution is submitted. The King makes the final decision.

A Consultative Assembly ordinary session must be held at least once every two weeks, although the speaker may advance or postpone it when considered necessary. It requires a quorum of at least two-thirds of its members, including the Speaker or an appointed deputy, for resolutions to be valid. Resolutions must be approved by a majority of the members present. Each year, the King or his representative delivers a speech before the Council outlining the State's domestic and foreign policy. The official seat of the chamber is in Riyadh, though it may convene elsewhere in the country if the King deems it necessary.

== Leadership ==
The Consultative Assembly is led by four senior officials appointed and removed by royal decree: the Speaker (presiding officer), the Deputy Speaker, the Assistant Speaker, and the Secretary-General.

Sheikh Mohammed bin Jubair, who was a respected Salafi jurist and former Minister of Justice, was appointed as the president of the first Council term and of successive ones. He remained the speaker until his death in 2002, and was replaced by Saleh bin Abdullah bin Homaid.

The fifth term council (2009–2012), which started on 28 February 2009, included the topic of no women and was led by chairman Dr. Abdullah bin Mohammed al ash Sheikh, who had previously served as Minister of Justice from 1992 to 2009. A prominent conservative Islamic scholar, his appointment was widely interpreted as a move to reinforce the Council’s adherence to Islamic principles in its deliberations. The deputy chairman in the fifth term was Dr. Bandar bin Mohammed Hamza Asad Hajar. Assistant chairman was Abdulrahman bin Abdullah Al Barrak from February 2009 to December 2011. Secretary-general of the Assembly was Mohammed A. Al Ghamdi. Al Ghamdi, whose four-year term expired in May 2012, was replaced by Mohammed al Amr as the new secretary general of the council.

Speakers of the Consultative Assembly

Name	Took office	Left office	Notes
Abdul Gadir Al-Shebi	1924	1925	Speaker of the National Council
Mohammed Al-Marzouki	1925	1926	Speaker of the National Council
Faisal bin Abdulaziz Al Saud	1926	25 March 1975	Kings of Saudi Arabia from 2 November 1964 to August 1993
Khalid bin Abdulaziz Al Saud	25 March 1975	13 June 1982	Kings of Saudi Arabia from 2 November 1964 to August 1993
Fahd bin Abdulaziz Al Saud	13 June 1982	20 August 1993	Kings of Saudi Arabia from 2 November 1964 to August 1993
Mohammed bin Jubair	20 August 1993	10 January 2002	
Salih bin Abdullah al-Humaid	8 February 2002	15 February 2009	
Abdullah ibn Muhammad Al ash-Sheikh	15 February 2009	Incumbent	

== Composition ==
Members of the Consultative Assembly are appointed by the King and are drawn from across the country’s various provinces. The composition of the Council typically reflects representation from three key societal sectors: the religious establishment, the bureaucracy, and the business community. They seem to be followers of both conservative and liberal ideologies, and are usually highly educated and experienced people who are regarded as experts in their fields. Mostly academics, retired senior officers, ex-civil servants and businessmen have been appointed as the members of the council.

=== 2005–2009 term ===
During the fourth term of the Consultative Assembly (2005–2009), the total number of members was increased to 150. The distribution of members by occupation during the fourth term was as follows:

Occupation	Number (n=150)	Percentage (%)
Academic (PhD)	105	70
Bureaucrat/engineer	12	8
Bureaucrat/religious	4	2.6
Bureaucrat (master's or bachelor's degree)	25	16.7
Military	4	2.6

=== 2009–2013 term ===
During the fifth term of the Consultative Assembly (2009–2013), approximately half of the members (and 43% of the newly appointed ones) had received their university education in the United States. A significant majority, around 70%, held doctoral degrees (PhDs). Members of this term were often described as technocrats, selected more for their professional and academic expertise than for traditional local leadership roles.

The academic qualifications of the Council members during this term were distributed as follows: 16% held bachelor's degrees, 13% held master's degrees, 70% held PhDs, and 1% held medical degrees (MDs). In terms of the countries where members received their higher education, the distribution was as follows: 49% studied in the United States, 29% in Saudi Arabia, 16% in the United Kingdom, 3% in France, 1% in Germany, 1% in Egypt, and 1% in Pakistan.

The representation of provinces at the Shura Council is given below:

Province	Percentage of population (%)	Percentage in council (%)
Al-Jawf	2	4
Tabuk	3	2
Northern Borders	1	4
Ḥa'il	3	4
Qassim	5	13
Eastern	16	8
Medina	7	12
Mecca	22	24
Riyadh	23	18
Al-Bahah	2	2
Asir	8	6
Jazan	6	2
Najran	2	1

=== 2013–present ===
Since 2013, the Consultative Assembly has included 30 women members out of the total of 150 members. This period has included the sixth (2013–2016), seventh (2016–2020), eighth (2020–2024) and ninth terms (2024–present).

== Committees ==
The Consultative Assembly can form specialized committees tasked with studying specific areas of policy and legislation, as well as reviewing relevant draft laws, government reports, and policy proposals within their area of focus. The membership of these committees, including the chairpersons and vice-chairpersons, is reconstituted at the beginning of each legislative year. Over time, the number and scope of committees have been expanded to reflect the growing responsibilities of the Council.

In its original form, the Shura Council consisted of eight specialized committees, which were established in December 1995. The original committees and their respective number of members were as follows: Committee on Social and Health Affairs (7 members); Committee on Economic and Financial Affairs (8 members); Committee on Legislation and Administration (5 members); Committee on Foreign Affairs (7 members); Committee on Islamic Affairs (7 members); Committee on Service and the Public Sector (8 members); Committee on Education, Culture and Information Affairs (9 members); and Committee on Security Affairs (6 members).

As of October 2026, the Consultative Assembly comprises fifteen specialized committees:

- Islamic and Judicial Affairs Committee
- Commerce and Investment Committee
- Energy and Industry Committee
- Security and Military Affairs Committee
- Foreign Affairs Committee
- Human Resources and Social Development Committee
- Education and Scientific Research Committee
- Culture and Tourism Committee
- Media and Sports Committee
- Financial and Economic Affairs Committee
- Health Affairs Committee
- Transport, Technology, and Artificial Intelligence Committee
- Human Rights Committee
- Hajj, Spatial Development, and Housing Committee
- Water, Agriculture and Environment Committee

== Women members ==
Women were first allowed to join the Consultative Assembly in 2013. As of October 2017, women make up 20% of the Council's total number, slightly more than the 115th United States Congress (19.3%). Among these are Sara bint Faisal Al Saud and Moudi bint Khalid Al Saud, both members of the Saudi royal family. As of December 2016, the following women were members of the council:

- Khawla Al-Kuraya (physician and cancer specialist)
- Ahlam Mohammed al-Hakmi (academic scholar, dean at Jazan University)
- Asma Saleh al-Zahrani (academic scholar)
- Iqbal zain al-Abedin Darandri (statistics and research)
- Amal Salama al-Shaman
- Jawaher Dhafer al-Anizi
- Jawhara Nasser al-Yami
- Hamda Maqbool al-Joufi
- Hanan Abdulrahman al-Ahmadi (Associate professor of health administration at the Institute of Public Administration); Assistant Speaker since October 2020
- Raedah Abdullah Abunayan
- Zainab Abu Taleb
- Samia Abdullah Bakhari (academic and religious scholar)
- Sultanah Abdulmusleh al-Bidwi (educationalist)
- Alia Aldahlawi (researcher in microbiology)
- Fatimah al-Shehri
- Fardous Saud al-Saleh (doctorate in nuclear physics)
- Fawzia Aba al-Khail (Fawziyya Abu Khalid?)
- Kawthar al-Arbash (writer and journalist)
- Latifa Ahmad al-Buainain
- Latifah Ashaalan (Associate professor of psychology at Princess Nora bint Abdul Rahman University)
- Lina K. Almaeena (member of the Kingdom Young Business Women Council)
- Mona Almushait (Associate professor in obstetrics and gynecology at King Khalid University)
- Mastourah Obaid Al-Shammari
- Nihad Al-Jishi
- Nora Abdulrahman Al-Yousif
- Nora Faraj al-Musaed (sociology professor at King Abdulaziz University)
- Nora Al-Shaaban
- Nora Mohammed al-Merri (researcher on Arabic literature)
- Huda Abdurahman Al-Halisi
- Mody Al-Khalaf (diplomat)

== See also ==
- Saad Albazei
- Unicameralism
- Ibrahim Al-Buleihi
- Politics of Saudi Arabia
- List of legislatures by country
- Abdullah Mohammed Al-Hugail
