= Ibrahim Al-Buleihi =

Saudi writer and thinker

- إبراهيم البليهي
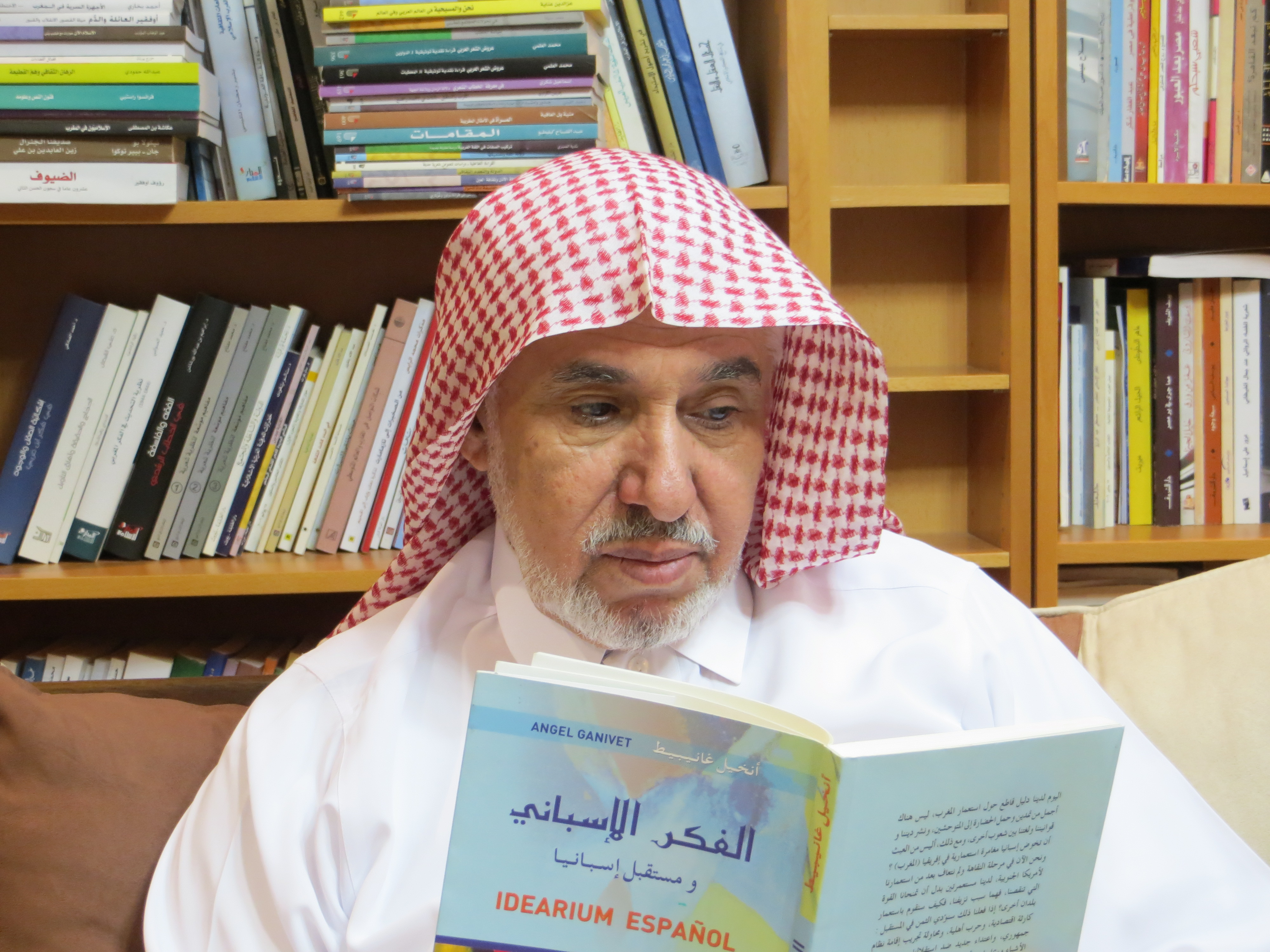
- Al-Buleihi at his house in Riyadh in 2013
- Born: 1944 (age 81–82); Ash-Shimasiyah, Al-Qassim, Saudi Arabia
- Education: Imam Muhammad ibn Saud Islamic University
- Occupations: Politician, writer, and philosopher

Ibrahim Al-Buleihi (Arabic: إبراهيم البليهي; born 1944) is a Saudi writer, liberal thinker, and former member of the Shura Council from 2005 to 2016. Known for his advocacy of critical thinking and his praise of Western civilization, Al-Buleihi has published several philosophical works addressing development, cultural stagnation, and creativity in Arab societies.

== Early life and education ==
Al-Buleihi was born in Ash-Shimasiyah, a town in the Al-Qassim Region of central Saudi Arabia. He comes from the Dawasir tribe and earned a degree in Islamic Sharia from Imam Muhammad ibn Saud Islamic University. He began working in government while completing his secondary and university education as a part-time student. His graduation thesis was awarded distinction and later published by the university.

== Career ==
Before entering the Shura Council, Al-Buleihi held several leadership positions in Saudi municipalities:

- Head of the municipality of Hotat Bani Tamim (1972)
- Mayor of Khamis Mushait (1973)
- Mayor of Hail (1976)
- Director General of Municipal Affairs in the Eastern Province (1984)
- Director General of Municipal Affairs in the Qassim Region (1985–retirement)

He was appointed to the Shura Council on 3 March 2005 and served until 2016. He was also a columnist for *Al-Riyadh* newspaper and a frequent commentator on intellectual, social, and political matters.

== Thought and philosophy ==
Al-Buleihi is known for his outspoken critiques of intellectual stagnation in Arab and Islamic societies. He attributes this stagnation to a refusal to embrace self-criticism, openness to other cultures, and scientific reasoning. In contrast, he praises Western civilization for fostering individual freedom, reason, and institutional accountability.

In his writings and interviews, Al-Buleihi argues that civilizations such as Japan and Germany progressed by selectively adopting Western values such as scientific inquiry, meritocracy, and cultural openness, without abandoning their own cultural identity.

He calls for a cultural awakening in Arab societies by promoting:

- Critical thinking and scientific reasoning
- Rejection of rote learning and uncritical imitation
- Dialogue over dogmatism
- Respect for opposing viewpoints

Al-Buleihi’s approach retains a spiritual role for Islam, emphasizing its ethical value, while encouraging the development of modern, pluralistic civic institutions.

== Works ==
Al-Buleihi has authored numerous books and articles, including:

- The Qualitative Changes in Human Civilization
- Bunyat al-Takhaluf (The Structure of Backwardness)
- Wa’d Maqūmāt al-Ibdāʿ (The Burial of the Components of Creativity)
- Makan al-Taqaddum (The Locus of Progress)
- Ḥuṣūn al-Takhaluf (Fortresses of Backwardness)
- ʿAbqariyyat al-Ihtimām al-Talqāʾī (The Genius of Spontaneous Attention) – 2017
- Al-Riyādah wa al-Istijābah (Leadership and Responsiveness) – 2018
- Al-Insān kāʾin Ṭalqāʾī (Man is a Spontaneous Being) – 2019
- Ḥaḍārah Muʿāqah (Crippled Civilization) – 2022
- Al-Ibdāʿ wa al-Ittibāʿ (Creativity and Conformity) – 2022

His philosophical project touches on the sociology of ignorance, development psychology, and the causes of civilizational decline.

== Legacy and reception ==
In 2025, Moroccan researcher Mohammed Hakmoun published a book titled Thus Spoke Al-Buleihi, which explores the thinker’s contributions to Arab intellectual discourse.

== Memberships and affiliations ==
- Member of the board of trustees, Prince Abdullah Foundation for Charitable Housing
- Board member of the General Authority for Tourism and Heritage
- Cultural committee member, Qassim Literary Club
- Member of the Ethics Research Society at the Library of Alexandria in Egypt
- Served on the Water Authority Board of Qassim for 15 years
- Member of the Qassim Regional Council for 10 years

== See also ==
- Arab intellectual renaissance
