= Ali Dashti =

Iranian politician (1897–1982)

Ali Dashti علی دشتی
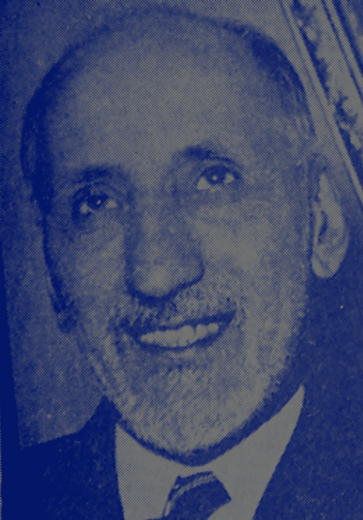
- Born: 31 March 1897; Bushehr province, Sublime State of Iran
- Died: 16 January 1982 (aged 84); Tehran, Iran
- Occupations: Politician, Writer, Journalist
- Known for: 23 Years: A Study of the Prophetic Career of Mohammad
- Political party: Independent

Ali Dashti (Persian: علی دشتی, pronounced [æˈliː dæʃˈtiː]; 31 March 1897 – 16 January 1982) was an Iranian writer, journalist, and politician. Dashti served as a senator in Iran during the Pahlavi era.

== Biography ==
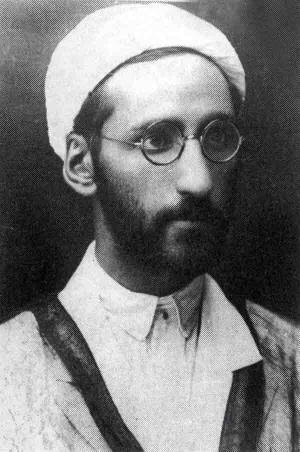
Ali Dashti in his youth

Born into a Persian family in Dashti within the Bushehr province on 31 March 1897, Ali Dashti received a traditional religious education. He studied Islamic theology, history, Arabic, Persian grammar, and classical literature at madrasas in Karbala and Najaf. He returned to Iran in 1918 and lived in Shiraz and Isfahan before settling in Tehran to pursue a career in journalism and regional politics.

Dashti published the newspaper Shafaq-e Sorkh in Tehran from 1922 to 1935. He served as a member of the Majlis at various times between 1928 and 1946.

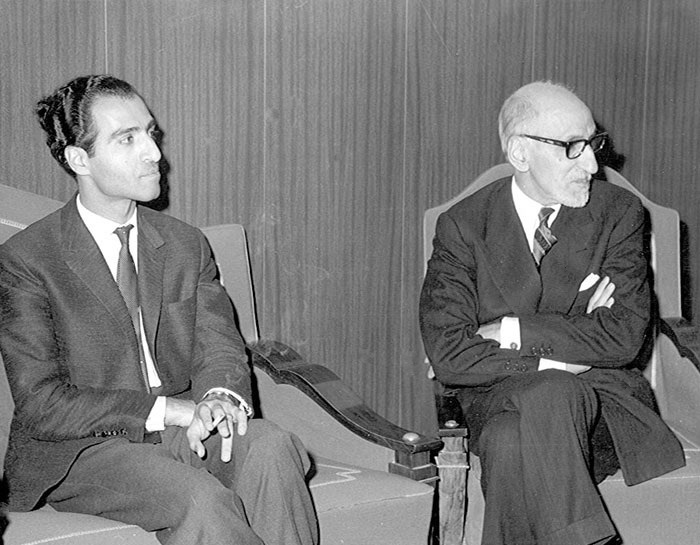
Ali Dashti and Prince Ahmad Reza Pahlavi, 1950s.

His public criticism of allowing the Tudeh Party into the government cabinet and his opposition to concessions made to the Soviets led to his imprisonment in 1946. Following his release, he was appointed to the Senate in 1954, a position he held until the 1979 Iranian Revolution.

In 1975, Dashti provided the papers for his manuscript Bist O Seh Sal (Twenty Three Years) to Frank R. C. Bagley, a professor of Persian and Arabic studies, requesting that the English translation not be released until after his death. Dashti repeated this request in 1977 and 1978. Bagley subsequently organized and translated the text, which was published posthumously in 1985. Iranian media reported Dashti's death during the month of Dey in the Iranian calendar year 1360 (between 22 December 1981 and 20 January 1982).

== Writing ==
In his work 23 Years: A Study of the Prophetic Career of Mohammad, Dashti favored rational critique over religious orthodox belief systems, arguing for impartial, historical study over blind faith. He questioned the accounts of miracles attributed to Muhammad within Islamic tradition and challenged the orthodox position regarding the divine authorship of the Quran. Dashti argued that the ethical principles and historical narratives within the text reflected pre-existing ideas from surrounding Jewish and Christian traditions encountered during early trade journeys.

== Bibliography ==
=== Persian classics analysis ===
- Naqshi az Hafez (1936), on the poet Hafez.
- Seyr-i dar Divan-e Shams, on the lyric verse of Rumi (translated into English by Sayeh Dashti in 2003).
- Dar Qalamrow-e Sa'di, on the poet and prose-writer Sa'di.
- Sha'eri dir-ashna (1961), on Khaqani.
- Dami ba Khayyam (1965), on Omar Khayyam (translated into English by Laurence P. Elwell Sutton as In Search of Omar Khayyam, London 1971).
- Negah-i be Sa'eb (1974), on the poet Sa'eb.
- Kakh-e ebda', andisheha-ye gunagun-e Hafez, an analysis of historical ideas expressed by Hafez.

=== Ethics, theology and philosophy ===
- Parda-ye pendar (1974), an analysis of Sufism.
- Jabr ya ekhtiyar (1971), a series of dialogues concerning predestination and free will.
- Takht-e Pulad (1971–1972), historical theological dialogues based in the Takht-e Pulad cemetery of Isfahan.
- Oqala bar khelaf-e 'aql (1975), a critique of logical contradictions within arguments used by traditional theologians, particularly Al-Ghazali.
- Dar diyar-e Sufiyan (1975), a continuation of structural themes introduced in Parda-ye pendar.
- Bist o Se Sal (published posthumously in English as 23 Years: A Study of the Prophetic Career of Mohammad).

=== Novels ===
Dashti's fiction often focused on the social roles, personal agency, and cultural struggles of educated Iranian women in mid-20th-century urban society.

- Dashti, Ali (1943). Fetneh: Perspectives on Cosmopolitan Women in 1940S Tehran. Xlibris US. p. 180. ISBN 978-1-796-02291-9.
- Dashti, Ali (1951). Jaadoo: Perspectives on Cosmopolitan Women in 1940S Tehran. Xlibris US. p. 164. ISBN 978-1-664-15039-3.
- Hendu (1955)
- Dashti, Ali (2003). A Voyage Through Divan-e Shams: Celebrating Rumi. Ketab Sara. p. 228. ISBN 978-9-645-84075-2.
