= Zakaria Botros =

Egyptian Coptic priest

Father Zakaria Botros

Personal life
- Born: October 24, 1934 (age 92) Kafr El Dawwar, Egypt
- Occupation: Priest, television host, Islamic critic

Religious life
- Religion: Christianity
- Denomination: Coptic Orthodox

Senior posting
- Awards: Daniel of the Year (2008)

Zakaria Botros (Egyptian Arabic: زكريا بطرس; born 24 October 1934, in Kafr El Dawwar) is a Coptic Orthodox Christian priest.He worked as a priest in Australia in 1992. He is best known for his critiques of the Qur'an and other books of Islam. World Magazine gave Father Botros the Daniel of the Year award in 2008. He has been named "Islam's public enemy No. 1" by Arabic newspaper al Insan al Jadeed. Al-Qaeda has put a C$60 million bounty on his head.

== Television ==
Botros became widely known in 2003 after he appeared on talk shows on the Hayah Evangelical Channel. He went on to have his own show on the channel. His criticism of Islam led to many debates about him on talk shows and threats from the Muslim Brotherhood. He frequently appears on Al Hayat TV.

=== Programme cancelled ===
In July 2010, the Joyce Meyer Evangelical Ministry – which was a partner for Hayah Channel – informed BBC Arabic that it would discontinue broadcasting Zakaria Botros's show. A quote from the letter reads:

Our ministry's representative in the middle east informed us that the Hayah Channel decided to stop broadcasting Zakaria Botros's talk show, and this is the last month of its broadcast.

The ministry did not comment on the cancellation.

=== Al Fady Channel ===
Zakaria opened his own channel in April 2011, which he called "Alfady". It is broadcast in North America and the Middle East since November 2011.

== Vienna presentation ==
Botros was supposed to give a presentation in Vienna on 6 May 2012. The presentation would have been his first major appearance in Europe, but the event was cancelled due to "numerous threats of violence." The Viennese Association of Academics published an apology in the press.

== Response from Muslims ==
=== Debates ===
His most well known respondents included Abo Islam Ahmad Abdullah, Dr. Ibrahim Awad, and Dr. Abdullah Badr. Other public figures suggested that he be ignored.

Abo Islam Ahmad Abdullah said he invited the Coptic priest to a debate with a moderator on a TV show inside Egypt, but the offer was refused due to safety reasons because he would be arrested by Egyptian authorities and may be killed by fanatic Muslims. Despite Muslim scholars promising to stay with him during the whole trip to guard him they cannot protect him from Egyptian authorities nor from fanatic muslims.

=== Calls for stripping his citizenship ===
In 2009, Nabih Elwahsh asked the Egyptian government to strip Zakaria Botros's citizenship due to "the instability and disturbance to public security that he caused in Egypt".

=== Calls to arrest him ===
An Egyptian lawyer, Mahmoud Riad, sued the Egyptian president, the Foreign Minister, the Interior Minister, and the Information Minister in a lawsuit to force the Egyptian government to request that Interpol arrest and extradite Zakaria Botros back to Egypt so that he might be held accountable for his denunciation of Islam. He stated that denouncing Islam is high treason, and that Egypt should withdraw the ambassador to the country where Botros broadcasts. Earlier, four lawyers had asked for the same thing.
