= Fawziyya Abu Khalid =

Saudi Arabian professor of sociology, poet

- فوزية أبو خالد
- Born: 1955 (age 70–71); Riyadh, Saudi Arabia
- Education: American University of Beirut (B.A., sociology); Lewis and Clark College (M.A.)
- Occupations: Poet, writer, professor

Fawziyya Abu Khalid (Arabic:فوزية أبو خالد) (born 1955) is a Saudi Arabian poet, essayist, sociologist, and professor. Her poetry is noted for its prominent political motifs and focus on women's ability to attain education and freedom. Her literary reputation was established by the publication of her first poetry collection, Until When Will They Abduct You on Your Wedding Night? (1974). She went on to publish two other poetry collections, entitled the Secret Readings in the History of Arab Silence (1985) and Mirage Water (1995).

== Early life and education ==
Born in Riyadh in 1955, Fawziyya Abu Khalid was raised in an upper-class Bedouin family of eleven children. Her mother, Sharifa Nur al-Hashemi, was from Mecca, and was a public advocate for restricted women's activities and learning opportunities in Hejaz. Sharifa Nur al-Hashemi's quest for education and the equality of the sexes inspired Abu Khalid to write and express herself from a very young age.

During a time when women in Saudi Arabia lacked educational opportunities, Fawziyya Abu Khalid was fortunate enough to receive an education. She earned a BA in sociology from the American University of Beirut in Beirut, Lebanon and a MA from Lewis and Clark College in Portland, Oregon. She also holds a PhD. in sociology, and works as a professor at King Saud University.

== Literary career ==
Fawziyya Abu Khalid is notable for being the modern poetic voice of Saudi Arabian women. Although her early work mostly discussed social issues, she later moved on to writing about politics. In 1975, she published her first prose poetry collection in the form of a novel entitled, How Long Will They Abduct You on Your Wedding Night? She later published two other prose poetry collection novels: Secret Readings in the History of Arab Silence (1985) and Mirage Water (1995). She also published children's books and several essays on the study of sociology.

Fawziyya Abu Khalid's poetry is full of free verse as well as discursive strategies that represent her eastern and Arab roots. She is identified as a Saudi Arabian through her use of allusions to oases and the Peninsula. Similarly, she is identified as a Muslim through her references to traditional Islamic symbols like Zamzam water and houries. Despite her connection to her eastern and Arab roots, Abu Khalid still employs a modern narrative technique that defines her as a contemporary Arab woman poet. She is considered modern due to her use of "intellectualized language [that] is penetrated by candid self-expression." Her femininity is shown through her detailed descriptions of the female body and the discussion of child labor in her most notable poem, Mother's Inheritance.

She was a jury member of the poetry contest Mu'allaqa 45.

=== Critical reception ===
Fawziyya Abu Khalid has faced censorship due to the strict interpretation of Islamic law, known as Wahhabism. Despite Saudi Arabia's rigid laws, Abu Khalid has not allowed this censorship to limit her artistic expression.

Fawziyya Abu Khalid has been criticized for writing candidly about women's bodies and for publicly paying tribute to writers. Although she was expected as a female poet to establish a persona in her work that would maintain anonymity, she instead decided to use her own voice as the speaker in her poetry. Critics found it unacceptable for a woman to write in her own voice, and therefore ridiculed Abu Khalid. Several conservative groups attacked her political themes and thoughts on women's education and liberation, and pushed for her work to be banned in Saudi Arabia.

== Works ==
=== Collections ===
- Until When Will They Abduct You on Your Wedding Night?(ila mata yakhtuifunaki lailat al-'urs) (1975)
- Secret Readings in the History of Arab Silence (1985)
- Mirage Water (ma'al-sarab)(1995)

=== Non-fiction books ===
- Biography of Mothers

=== Notable poems ===
- "Mother's Inheritance"
- "Butterflies"
- "To a Man"
- "Tattoo Writing"
- "Two Little Girls"
- "A Pearl"
- "Unannounced Trial of an Overt Act of Love"
- "Would I Betray You"
- "To Enjoy the Horror"
- "Poem"

=== In anthologies ===
- Boullata, Kamal, ed. (1978). Women of the Fertile Crescent: An Anthology of Modern Poetry by Arab Women. Three Continents Press.

== Women's rights activism ==
In September 2007, Fawziyya Abu Khalid's picture was featured inside an article from The International Herald Tribune. The article focuses on a woman's right to drive, a topic of growing and lively debate in Saudi Arabia. In the picture, she can be seen sitting in the backseat of a car as she is forced to rely on men to drive her around.

In September 2011, Fawziyya Abu Khalid spoke out in an interview with the Australian Broadcasting Corporation as a supporter of Saudi Arabia's ruling that women would finally be given the right to vote and stand for election in 2015. In the interview, she said: "As we say, people, they don't live only on bread, but freedom is very important element for human being to live in dignity and in equality." On the topic, she also publicly stated: "I think there is a realization by different groups, including the conservative group in Saudi Arabia, that what happened in the past, that they are the only voice in the society, [the silencing of women] will not continue, and that they have to admit and to live that there are other voices and there are other views."
