= Ministry of Civil Service (Saudi Arabia) =

Agency overview
- Formed: 1999; 27 years ago
- Jurisdiction: Government of Saudi Arabia
- Headquarters: Riyadh
- Website: www.mcs.gov.sa

The Ministry of Civil Service was a governmental body in Saudi Arabia that is responsible for arranging the affairs of public employees. It was founded by a royal decree in 1999 to replace the General Bureau of Civil Service and Dr Muhammad bin Ali Al-Fayez served as its first minister. In February 2020, the Ministry was merged with Ministry of Labour and Social Development into a new ministry called Ministry of Human Resources and Social Development.

== Its Functions ==
The ministry’s main functions are:

- to plan the civil manpower as required by the government
- to guarantee that the civil servants’ competencies match the government’s requirements
- to recommend systems of civil service
- to improve the civil service
- to develop rules and regulations that keep the government employees’ records
- to collaborate with HR departments in different governmental entities
