= Brother Rachid =

Christian missionary (born 1971)

- Born: Rachid Hammami; 1971 (age 54–55); Sidi Bennour, Morocco
- Education: Hassan II University
- Occupation: Televangelist
- Known for: Television personality
- Children: 3

Rachid Hammami, best known as Brother Rachid, also Brother Rasheed, (born 1971, Morocco) is a Moroccan former Muslim and convert to Christianity whose father is an Imam. He is a Christian apologist and critic of Islam, and hosts a weekly live call-in show on Al Hayat TV where he compares Islam and Christianity.

== Biography ==
Rachid was born in Morocco to a conservative Muslim family and raised in Doukkala. His father was an imam. He memorized one-sixth of the Quran by age 6. He studied economics and computer science at Hassan II University in Casablanca. In 1990, at the age of 19, he converted from Islam to Christianity after studying the differences between the two faiths with the original intent to defend Islam. When his parents found out about his conversion, they ejected him from their home, and he went to live with a missionary but was eventually forced to flee Morocco. After determining that over 80 million Arabs did not truly understand the Classical Arabic dialect that the Quran was written in, he undertook the translation of the Quran into local Arabic dialects believing that if more Muslims understood the words of the Quran, they would leave the faith.

In 2005, he began hosting his own television program on Al Hayat TV comparing the virtues of Christianity over Islam, including 55 taped episodes of Lifting the Veil and 555 live episodes of Daring Questions, ending in 2018, after 12 years which allowed Muslims to call in and ask questions about Christianity, and also featured testimonies from former Muslims who have converted to Christianity. The channel is controversial in the Islamic world and is banned in several Muslim countries. The channel was founded in Cyprus in 2003 by Al Hayat Ministries, an evangelical organization. In 2006, new evangelical partners joined Al Hayat TV, including Joyce Meyer Ministries.

== Views and beliefs ==
Rachid asks that all Moroccans be allowed: 1. To change their religion; 2. To own the translated version of the Bible in Moroccan Arabic or Arabic language without the fear of being arrested; 3. To give Christian names to their children; 4. To teach their children Christianity in school instead of Islam; and 5. The right for free practice of Christianity.

In a video called “A Message to President Obama From a Former Muslim”, he asserts that the actions of Islamic State of Iraq and Syria (ISIS) do speak for the religion of Islam, despite assertions to the contrary, and asserts that terrorism begins in the schools and mosques:

“How many Saudi Sheiks are preaching hatred? How many Islamic channels are indoctrinating people and teaching them violence from the Koran and the Hadith? How many Friday sermons are made against the West, freedom, and Democracy? How many Islamic schools are producing generations of teachers and students who believe in jihad and martyrdom and fighting the infidels? And finally, how many websites are funded by governments, your allies, that have sheiks who issue fatwas against basic human rights? If you want to fight terrorism, start from there.”

“Unless the Muslim world deals with Islam and separates religion from state, we will never end this cycle. ... If Islam is not the problem, then why is it there are millions of Christians in the Middle East and yet none of them has ever blown up himself to become a martyr, even though they live under the same economic and political circumstances and even worse?”

Rachid believes that the rise of the ISIS has created an unprecedented crisis of faith in the Islamic world: "Many Muslims are saying, 'If ISIS is Islam, I'm leaving.' Some are becoming atheists...There is a huge wave of atheism in the Arab world right now and many are turning to Jesus Christ. Islam was never faced with this crisis before." Rachid believes that a Christian "awakening" is happening in the Middle East with many Muslims becoming either Christians or atheists after they find out what Islam really is about and that Islam is unlike other religions because "Islam does not accept any law besides Allah's law".

== Personal life ==
His wife is also a Moroccan Christian and they have three children.
