= Sultan Qaboos Award for Culture, Arts and Literature =

Sultan Qaboos Prize for Culture, Arts, and Literature
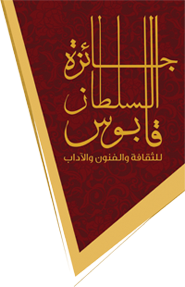
- Awarded for: Outstanding contributions to culture, arts, and literature.
- Description: An annual Omani award for achievements in culture, arts, and literature.
- Sponsored by: Sultan Qaboos bin Said
- Country: Oman
- First award: 2011

The Sultan Qaboos Prize for Culture, Arts, and Literature is an annual award for culture, arts, and literature. It is awarded biennially, with one year dedicated to Omani citizens and the next year open to both Omanis and Arabs. Three winners are selected annually.

The prize was established by Sultan Qaboos bin Said through Royal Decree No. 18/2011 on February 27, 2011. In March 2012, the prize's board of trustees held a press conference to announce the financial details, organizational structure, and eligibility requirements for nominees.

== Objectives ==
The main objectives of the prize are:

- To enhance human civilizational progress by supporting cultural, artistic, and literary fields.
- To solidify the process of intellectual accumulation and contribute to scientific development and the enrichment of knowledge.
- To provide a fertile environment based on intellectual and creative competition.
- To honor intellectuals, artists, and writers for their civilizational contributions in renewing thought and elevating human consciousness.
- To affirm Oman's contribution to human civilization through its material, intellectual, and cognitive achievements.

== Prize structure ==
The responsibility for organizing the workflow and implementation of the Sultan Qaboos Prize for Culture, Arts, and Literature is entrusted to the "Sultan Qaboos Higher Centre for Culture and Science." This includes defining the prize categories, announcing the opening and closing dates for nominations, forming the selection and judging committees, setting the dates for announcing the results, and presenting the awards.

== Awarding process ==
The prize is granted to recipients in the fields of culture, arts, and literature. For each award cycle, one specific branch from each of the three fields is chosen. This selection process results in a total of three winners each year: one individual from the field of culture, one from arts, and one from literature.

== See also ==
- Sultan Qaboos Prize for Environmental Preservation
- King Abdullah bin Abdulaziz International Award for Translation
