= List of Imams of the Two Holy Mosques =

Imams of Masjid al-Haram and Prophet's Mosque

This article provides the list of the imams of the Two Holy Mosques (Arabic: أئمة الحرمين, romanized: Aʾimmat al-Ḥaramayn). They are the prayer leaders appointed to serve at the Masjid al-Haram in Mecca and the Prophet's Mosque in Medina. They are tasked with leading daily prayers (Salah), Friday sermons, Tarawih, and other major religious observances. The imams are appointed by royal decree of the King of Saudi Arabia and serve as prayer leaders as well as Khatibs at the Two Holy Mosques. While their role is primarily religious and liturgical, some have also been noted for their Quran recitation, scholarly background, or wider public engagement through sermons broadcast from Mecca and Medina.

== Current Imams ==
=== Current Imams of Masjid al-Haram ===
This list includes the current Imams of Masjid al-Haram who have been officially appointed as full-time, permanent Imams:

Name	Appointed	Notes
Salih bin Abdullah al-Humaid صالح بن عبد الله بن حميد	1982	Former Chairman of the Saudi Shura Council and prominent Islamic scholar.
Abdul-Rahman Al-Sudais عبد الرحمن السديس	1984	Chief Imam; also President of the General Presidency for the Affairs of Haramain.
Usama Khayyat أسامة خياط	1998	In 1993, a royal decree appointed him as a member of the Saudi Shura Council.
Maher al-Mu'aiqly ماهر المعيقلي	2007	Also served as a guest Imam at the Prophet's Mosque, during the Ramadans of 2005 and 2006.
Abdullah Awad Al Juhany عبد الله عواد الجهني	2007	Holds a PhD. in Islamic Studies; known for his profound understanding of the Quran.
Faisal Ghazzawi فيصل غزاوي	2007	He lectured at Umm al-Qura University from 1989 and became an associate professor after earning his doctorate, serving in that role until 2010.
Bandar Baleela بندر بليلة	2013	He also works as an assistant professor at Taif University and is a member of the Council of Senior Scholars.
Yasir al-Dawsari ياسر الدوسري	2019–2023 2024(reappointed)	Was reappointed in March 2024; believed to be the youngest imam appointed at the Masjid al-Haram.
Badr al-Turki بدر التركي	2024	Appointed as a permanent Imam after serving as a guest Imam during Ramadan 2024.
Al-Waleed al-Shamsan الوليد الشمسان	2024	Appointed as a permanent Imam after serving as a guest Imam during Ramadan 2024.

=== Current Imams of Prophet's Mosque ===
This list includes the current Imams of Prophet's Mosque who have been officially appointed as full-time, permanent Imams:

Name	Appointed	Notes
'Ali al-Hudhayfi علي الحذيفي	1979	Chief imam of Masjid an-Nabawi.
Abdulbari ath-Thubaity عبد الباري الثبيتي	1993	Previously led tarawih at Masjid al-Haram as a guest imam.
Abdulmohsen Al-Qasim عبد المحسن القاسم	1997	He has authored several books, serves as an appeal judge in Medina, and teaches undergraduate students at the Islamic University of Medina.
Hussain Al ash-Sheikh حسين آل الشيخ	1997	He also serves as a judge at the High Court in Medina and has previously served as a judge in several other courts
Salah Al Budair صلاح البدير	1998 / 1999	Senior imam and Khatib; also serves as a judge.
Abdullah Al-Bu'ayjaan عبد الله البعيجان	2013	Appointed permanent imam (royal approval) July 2013
Khalid al-Muhanna خالد المهنا	2019	Listed among the resident imams at Masjid an-Nabawi and is an associate professor at Taibah University.
Ahmad Ali al-Hudhaify أحمد علي الحذيفي	2019	Served as Guest imam for Ramadan of 2017 to 2019 and was officially appointed in 2019. He is the son of 'Ali al-Hudhayfi
Muhammad Barhaji محمد برهجي	2024	Appointed permanent imam of Masjid an-Nabawi by royal decree in Oct 2024 (previously guest/Ramadan imam)
Abdullah Al-Qarafi عبدالله القرافي	2024	Appointed permanent imam (royal approval) Oct 2024
Saleh Al-Maghamsi	2026	Appointed in Ramadan 2026.

== Former Imams ==
=== Former Imams of Masjid al-Haram ===
This list includes former Imams of Masjid al-Haram who were either officially appointed as full-time Imams or served as guest Imams during Ramadan only:

Name	Served	Notes
Ahmad Zayni Dahlan	1871–1886	Served as a Imam and chief preacher, historian, Shafi'i jurist, also appointed as Grand Mufti of Mecca from 1871, Shaykh al-Islam of Hejaz.
Ahmad Khatib al-Minangkabawi	1880–1915	Indonesian scholar who held the position of imam and teacher within the Shafi'i school at Masjid al-Haram under Ottoman rule.
Abdullah Al-Khulaifi	1946–1993	Saudi imam who led prayers at the Masjid al-Haram for four decades in the 20th century.
Abdullah Abdul Ghani Khayat	1953–1984	Led prayers during the mid-20th century; member of Council of Senior Scholars.
Abdullah ibn Humaid	1957–1981	Jurist and imam of the Haram; later served as head of the Saudi Supreme Judicial Council. Died October 1982.
Mohammad al-Subayyil	1965–2008	Also directed the Presidency for the General Presidency of Haramain.
'Ali al-Hudhaify	1981, 1985–1986, 1988–1991 (guest imam)	Guest Imam for Ramadhan during the 1980s–1991; now Chief Imam of The Prophet's Mosque.
Ali Abdullah Jaber	1981–1983 (Permanent Imam) 1986–1989 (guest imam)	Noted for his Qur’an recitation style; appointed to Masjid al-Haram by King Khalid.
Saud Al-Shuraim	1991–2022	Imam and khatib of the Masjid al-Haram for about three decades.
Umar al-Subayyil	1993–2002	Imam and khatib of the Haram until his death in 2002.
Saleh al-Talib	2002–2018	Served until 2018, when he was dismissed and detained for ten years following criticism of social changes.
Salah Al Budair	2005–2006 (guest imam)	Led Tarawih in Ramadan 2005 and 2006; now Deputy Chief Imam of The Prophet's Mosque.
Khalid Al-Ghamdi	2008-2018	Former Imam for about 10 years Resigned in end of September 2018.
Adil al-Kalbani	2008 (guest imam)	Appointed to lead Tarawih prayers at the Haram.
Hassan Bukhari	2015 (guest imam)	Guest imam for Tarawih prayers during Ramadan in 2015.
Salah Ba'uthman	2016–2017 (guest imam)	Guest imam for Tarawih prayers during Ramadan in 2016 and 2017.

=== Former Imams of Prophet's Mosque ===
This list includes former Imams of Prophet's Mosque who were either officially appointed as full-time Imams or served as guest Imams during Ramadan only:

Name	Served	Notes
Abdul Aziz Al Saleh	1951–1993	also served as head of the courts of the Madinah region and was a member of Supreme Judicial Council and Council of Senior Scholars.
Abdul Majeed al-Jabarti	1970s–1980s	He also served as a member of the Council of Senior Scholars and the Supreme Judicial Council, and was the maternal grandfather of Ahmad Talib Hameed.
Ibrahim Al-Akhdar	1986–1995	Served as an imam of Al-Masjid an-Nabawi for roughly nine years beginning in 1986; active in Qur'an teaching and recitation activities.
Muhammad Ayyub	1990–1997; 2015	later served at Masjid Quba and returned as a guest Tarawih imam in 2015.
Abdullah Awad Al Juhany	1999–2007	Now appointed as an imam of Masjid al-Haram.
Maher al-Mu'aiqly ماهر المعيقلي	2005; 2006 (guest imam)	Served as a guest Imam during the Ramadans of 2005 and 2006, late was appointed Imam at Masjid al-Haram in 2007.
Saad al-Ghamdi	2009 (guest imam)	Guest imam for Taraweeh prayers at Al-Masjid an-Nabawi in Ramadan 2009.
Khalid Al-Ghamdi	2012-2013 (guest imam)	Guest imam for Tarawih prayers during Ramadan in 2012 and 2013
Ahmad Talib Hameed	2013–2025	In May 2025, reports noted that his name was no longer included among the imams however General Presidency of the Haramain did not provide an official Statement.
Muhammad Khalil al-Qari	2016, 2018 (guest imam)	Imam of Quba Mosque; son of Khalil Al-Qari.
Mahmoud Khalil Al-Qari	2017, 2018 (guest imam)	Imam of Masjid al-Qiblatayn; son of Khalil Al-Qari.

- Abdullah bin Zahim
- Ali Al Sudais
- Khalid Ghamdi

== See also ==
- List of Muezzins of the Two Holy Mosques
- List of burials at Jannat al-Baqī
- List of Quran reciters
