= List of burials at al-Baqi Cemetery =

Burials at al-Baqi cemetery in Medina

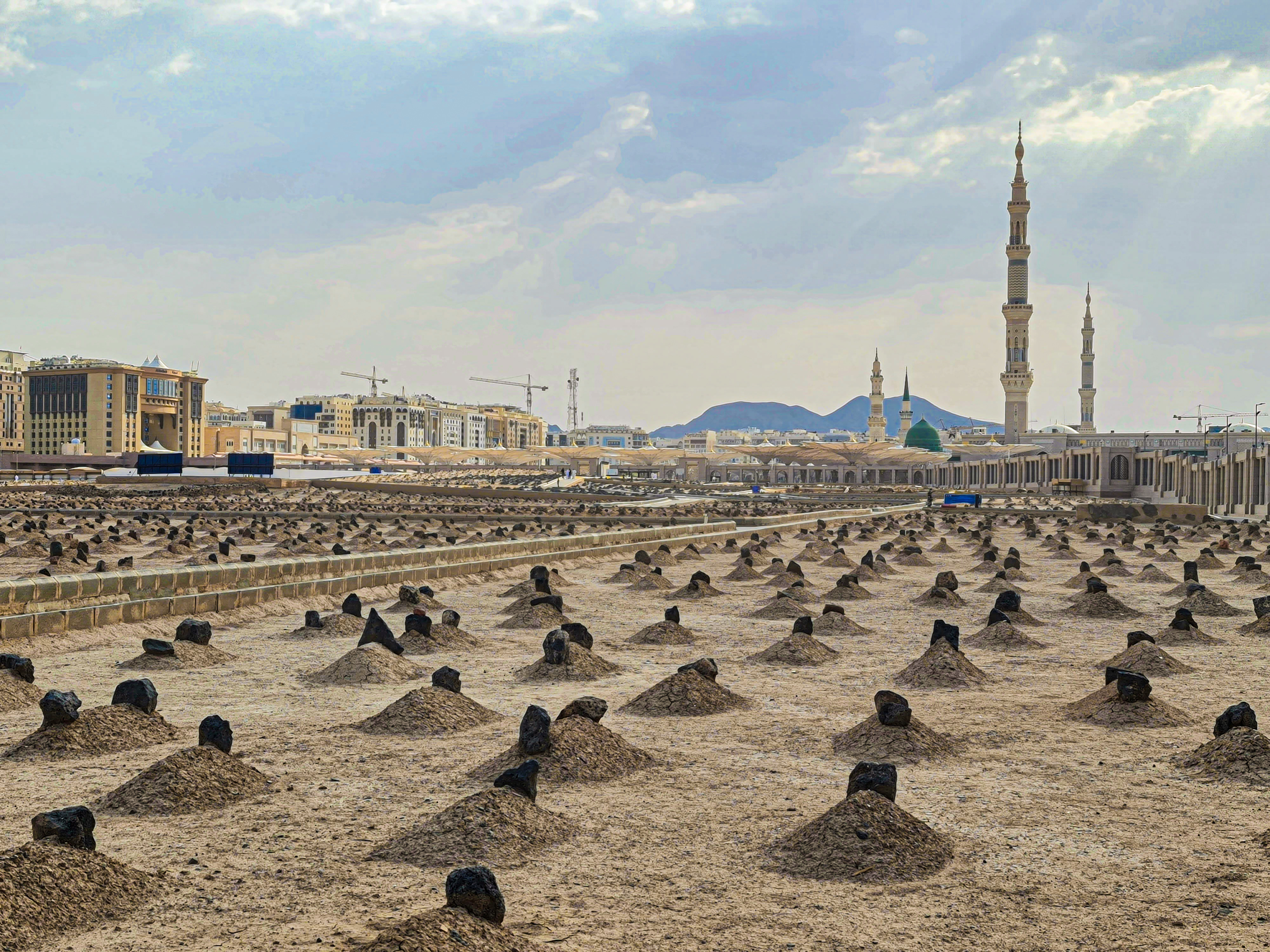
Al-Baqi Cemetery in 2021

This is a list of notable people buried at al-Baqi Cemetery in Medina, Saudi Arabia. It is the oldest and the first Islamic cemetery founded by the Islamic prophet Muhammad.

== Ahl al-Bayt ==
Chronological List of Ahl al-Bayt interred at Jannat al-Baqī:

Name	Death year (CE)	Notes
Immediate Family (Ahl al-Kisa, wives, and children)
Ruqayya bint Muhammad	March 624	Daughter of Muhammad and wife of Uthman.
Zaynab bint Khuzayma	625	Fifth wife of Muhammad, also known as Umm al-Masakin (mother of the poor).
Zainab bint Muhammad	629	Eldest daughter of Muhammad.
Umm Kulthum bint Muhammad	630	Daughter of Muhammad and also wife of Uthman.
Rayhana bint Zayd	c. 631	Wife or concubine of Muhammad, was a Jewish convert to Islam from the Banu Nadir
Ibrahim ibn Muhammad	c. 27 January 632	Son of the Muhammad; died in infancy
Fatima bint Muhammad	632	Daughter of Muhammad, wife of Ali. The exact burial place is not known, though many traditions hold that her grave is in Jannat al-Baqī.
Maria al-Qibtiyya	c. 637	Twelfth wife of Muhammad. She was an Egyptian (Copt) woman gifted to Muhammad in 628 as a slave.
Zaynab bint Jahsh	640 / 641	Seventh wife of Muhammad.
Sawdah bint Zam'ah	c. 644 or 674	Second wife of Muhammad.
Umm Habiba	664	Ninth wife of Muhammad.
Safiyya bint Huyayy	c. 664 – c. 672	Tenth wife of Muhammad, originating from a Jewish tribe Banu Nadir.
Hafsa bint Umar	c. 665	Fourth wife of Muhammad and daughter of Umar
Hasan ibn Ali	670	Grandson of Muhammad, son of Ali and Fatima. Briefly caliph in early Islamic history.
Juwayriya bint al-Harith	676	Eighth wife of Muhammad.
Aisha	c. 678	Third and youngest wife of Muhammad and daughter of first caliph Abu Bakr.
Umm Salama	c. 680 or 682/683	Sixth wife of Muhammad.
Extended Family (uncles, aunts, cousins and notable direct descendants of the Prophet)
Abd Allah ibn Uthman	625	Died in early childhood; grandson of Muhammad through Ruqayya and Uthman
Fatimah bint Asad	c. 626	Mother of Ali, aunt of Muhammad, known for her care for him.
Ali ibn Abi al-As	630	Died in early childhood; grandson of Muhammad through Zainab.
Safiyya bint Abd al-Muttalib	c. 640	Paternal aunt of Muhammad and mother of Zubayr ibn al-Awwam.
Lubaba bint al-Harith	c. 650	Sister-in-law of Muhammad and wife of Abbas ibn Abd al-Muttalib.
Abu Sufyan ibn al-Harith	c. 641 or 652	Cousin and foster-brother of Muhammad.
Abbas ibn Abd al-Muttalib	c. 653	Paternal uncle of Muhammad.
Fatima bint Hasan	c. 7th-Century	Daughter of Hasan ibn Ali and wife of Ali al-Zayn al-Abidin
Atika bint Abd al-Muttalib	7th-Century	Aunt of Muhammad.
Aqil ibn Abi Talib	670 or 683	Cousin of Muhammad and elder brother of Ali.
Umm al-Banin	c. 684	Wife of Ali and mother of Abbas ibn Ali
Abd Allah ibn Ja'far	c. 699 or 702/704	Nephew and son-in-law of Ali and cousin once removed of Muhammad.
Muhammad ibn al-Hanafiyya	c. 700 or 701	Son of Ali ibn Abi Talib, was an effective lieutenant for his father during his caliphate.
Ali al-Sajjad	c. 712 – c. 714	4th Shia Imam; great-grandson of Muhammad.
Hasan ibn Hasan	c. 715	Son of Hasan ibn Ali, also known as Hasan al-Mu'thannā.
Muhammad al-Baqir	c. 732	5th Shia Imam, known for transmitting knowledge.
Isma'il ibn Ja'far	c. 765 or 775	7th Ismaili Shia Imam; son of Ja'far al-Sadiq. Isma'ili sources hold that he was buried in Salamiyah, while other sources place his burial in al-Baqī
Ja'far al-Sadiq	765	6th Shia Imam, renowned scholar of hadith, Fiqh, and science.

== Companions of Muhammad ==
Chronological list of Companions of Muhammad (Sahabah) interred at Jannat al-Baqī:

Name	Death year (CE)	Notes
As'ad ibn Zurara	623	He suffered from an illness resembling diphtheria or meningitis. He is reported to be the first man buried in al-Baqi
Uthman ibn Maz'un	624	Was either the first Companion or the first Muhajir to be buried in the al-Baqi'
Khunays ibn Hudhafa	c. 624	Died 25 months after the Hijra. His funeral prayer was led by Muhammad.
Abu Salama	625	He was also a cousin and a foster-brother of Muhammad.
Sa'd ibn Mu'adh	c. 627	Chief of the Aws tribe in Medina and a prominent companion of Muhammad. He died shortly after the Battle of the Trench
Usayd ibn Hudayr	c. 620s / 630s	Was a leader of the Banū Aws tribe of Medina before his conversion to Islam.
Nusaybah bint Ka'ab	634	One of the early women to convert to Islam and a warrior who participated in the battles of Uhud, Hunain, and Yamamah.
Halima bint Abi Dhu'ayb	c. 635	Foster-mother and Wet nurse of Muhammad.
Ubayy ibn Ka'b	c. 649	He is notable for the Quran codex he compiled.
Abd Allah ibn Mas'ud	c. 653	Regarded by Sunni tradition as one of the greatest early interpreters of the Quran.He was buried at night in al-Baqi
Abu Sufyan ibn Harb	c. 653	A prominent opponent-turned companion of Muhammad.
Abd al-Rahman ibn Awf	c. 654	One of the wealthiest among the companions, he is known for being one of the ten to whom Paradise was promised.
Abu 'Abs ibn Jabr	654	Participated in military campaigns alongside Muhammad.
Uthman	656	The third Caliph and Son-in-law of Muhammad. He was initially reportedly to be buried in al-Baqī, but due to local resistance, was instead interred in a Jewish cemetery, which was later incorporated into al-Baqī by the Umayyads.
Ṣuhayb ibn Sinan	659	Former slave in the Byzantine Empire, raised speaking Greek, who became an early companion of Muhammad.
Abd Allah ibn Salam	663	A Jew who converted to Islam. He participated in the conquest of Syria, but died in Medina.
Zayd ibn Thabit	c. 665	Personal scribe of Muhammad, serving as the chief recorder of the Quranic text.
Sa'id ibn Zayd	671	Companion of Muhammad and a brother-in-law of Umar.
Sa'd ibn Abi Waqqas	674	Military Commander and Governor of Kufa.
Hakim ibn Hizam	c. 674	Respected merchant and a key figure in the Quraysh tribe and nephew of Khadija bint Khuwaylid
Hassan ibn Thabit	c. 674	Arabian poet, who was best known for poems in defence of Muhammad.
Abu Hurayra	679	Companion of Muhammad and considered the most prolific hadith narrator.
Abu Sa'īd al-Khūdrī	7th-Century	Prominent companion of Muhammad and prolific hadith narrator, He is believed to have died around 693, though some sources suggest 683.
Jumanah bint Abi Talib	7th-Century	Companion and first cousin of the Muhammad.
Usama ibn Zayd	680	Son of Zayd ibn Haritha, Muhammad's adopted son.
Ka'b ibn Zuhayr	7th-Century	Arab poet, wrote Bānat Su'ād, a qasida in praise of Muhammad. Which was the original Burdah, moved by the poem, Muhammad placed his mantle over him.

== Other notable burials ==
List of all other Burials at Al-Baqi Cemetery in alphabetical order:

=== A ===
- Aban ibn Uthman (d. 723); Early Muslim historian and traditionist, son of Uthman, and governor of Medina under the Umayyad caliph 'Abd al-Malik.
- Abd al-Fattah Abu Ghudda (d. 1997); Muslim Brotherhood leader, third Supreme Guide from 1973.
- Abdülmecid II (d. 1944); last Ottoman caliph, denied burial in Türkiye, his body stayed in Paris for 10 years before being moved to Medina.
- Abu Bakr al-Jaza'iri (d. 2018); Algerian Sunni scholar.
- Ahmad al-Ahsā'ī (d. 1826); Islamic theologian and jurist, founder of the Shaykhī school of Twelver Shi'ism.
- Ahmad Zayni Dahlan (d. 1886); Ottoman-era Shafi'i, served as Grand Mufti of the Mecca, and Imam al-Haramayn.
- Aminu Dantata (d. 2025); Nigerian industrialist and philanthropist, died in the UAE, his body was transported and buried in al-Baqī.
- Ashiq Ilahi Bulandshahri (d. 2002); Indian Deobandi scholar.

=== B ===
- Badre Alam Merathi (d. 1965); Indian Deobandi hadith scholar.

=== C ===
- Chupan (d. 1327); Chupanid noble of the Ilkhanate.

=== E ===
- Ehsan Elahi Zaheer (d. 1987); Pakistani scholar, founder of Jamiat Ahle Hadith.

=== F ===
- Fateh Muhammad Panipati (d. 1987); Pakistani scholar in qira'at.

=== H ===
- Hasan as-Senussi (d. 1992); Crown Prince of Libya (1956–1969).

=== I ===
- Idris of Libya (d. 1983); King of Libya (1951–1963).

=== K ===
- Khalil Ahmad Saharanpuri (d. 1927); Indian Deobandi scholar, Sufi of the Chishti Order, authored Badhl al-Majhud.
- Khalil Al-Qari (d. 2018); Sheikh (teacher) of the Imams of the Two Holy Mosques, founder of modern Qur’anic renaissance.
- Khawla al-Hanafiyya (d. 7th century); wife of Ali ibn Abi Talib.

=== M ===
- Maarouf al-Dawalibi (d. 2004); was a Syrian politician and was twice the prime minister of Syria.
- Mahmoud Khalil Al-Qari (d. 2022); imam of Masjid al-Qiblatayn and guest imam at Prophet's Mosque.
- Malik ibn Anas (d. 795); Muslim scholar, jurist, and traditionalist, eponym of the Maliki school.
- Mohammed al-Ghazali (d. 1996); Egyptian Islamic scholar.
- Muhammad 'Abid al-Sindi (d. 1841); Hanafi Faqīh, Muhaddith, and Qadi in Medina during the Ottoman Caliphate.
- Muhammad as-Samman al-Madani (d. 1776); Sunni Islamic scholar.
- Muhammad Ayyub (d. 2016); imam of Al-Masjid an-Nabawi and Masjid al-Quba in Medina.
- Muhammad Hayat al-Sindi (d. 1750); Islamic scholar during the Ottoman Empire.
- Muhammad Muhsin Khan (d. 2021); Afghan-origin scholar, translator of the Quran into English (Hilali–Khan).
- Muhammad Sayyid Tantawi (d. 2010); Egyptian scholar, grand mufti of Egypt (1986–1996) and grand imam of Al-Azhar.

=== N ===
- Nafi Mawla Ibn Umar (d. 736); Tabi‘un scholar of Fiqh and Hadith in Medina.
- Nafiʽ al-Madani (d. 785); transmitter of the seven canonical Qira'at.

=== Q ===
- Qasim ibn Muhammad ibn Abi Bakr (d. 738); was a faqīh, in early Islamic period.

=== R ===
- Rabi' al-Madkhali (d. 2025); Saudi scholar, head of Sunnah Studies Department at Islamic University of Madinah.
- Rafiuddin Deobandi (d. 1890); Indian scholar, Vice-Chancellor of Darul Uloom Deoband.

=== S ===
- Said ibn al-Musayyib (d. 715); Foremost jurist among the Tabi'un of Medina, renowned authority in Islamic jurisprudence, and transmitter of hadith.
- Salim ibn Abd Allah (d. 728); Hadith narrator, grandson of Umar ibn al-Khattab.
- Shams al-Din al-Sakhawi (d. 1497); 15th-century Muslim hadith scholar.
- Sheikh Shamil (d. 1871); Third Imam of the Caucasian Imamate, Sunni Naqshbandi sheikh, leader against Imperial Russia.

=== U ===
- Ubayd Allah ibn Abd Allah (d. 8th-century); among the Tabi'un, Medinian hadith narrator.
- Umm Farwa; wife of the fifth Shia Imam Muhammad al-Baqir and mother of Ja'far al-Sadiq.
- Urwa ibn al-Zubayr (d. 712/13); Early Muslim traditionist and historian of Medina, among the founders of Islamic historical scholarship.

=== Z ===
- Zakariyya Kandhlawi (d. 1982); Sunni scholar and hadith authority from India.
- Ziauddin Madani (d. 1981); Islamic scholar and Sufi Shaykh.
- Zine El Abidine Ben Ali (d. 2019); Tunisian politician and second President of Tunisia (1987–2011).
- Ziya-ur-Rahman Azmi (d. 2020); Indian-born Saudi scholar and former Dean of Hadith at the Islamic University of Madinah. A convert from Hinduism, he compiled the comprehensive Sahih hadith collection Al-Jāmi' al-Kāmil.

== Gallery ==
Some Images of the graves of Ahl al-Bayt and companions of Muhammad in Al-Baqi Cemetery

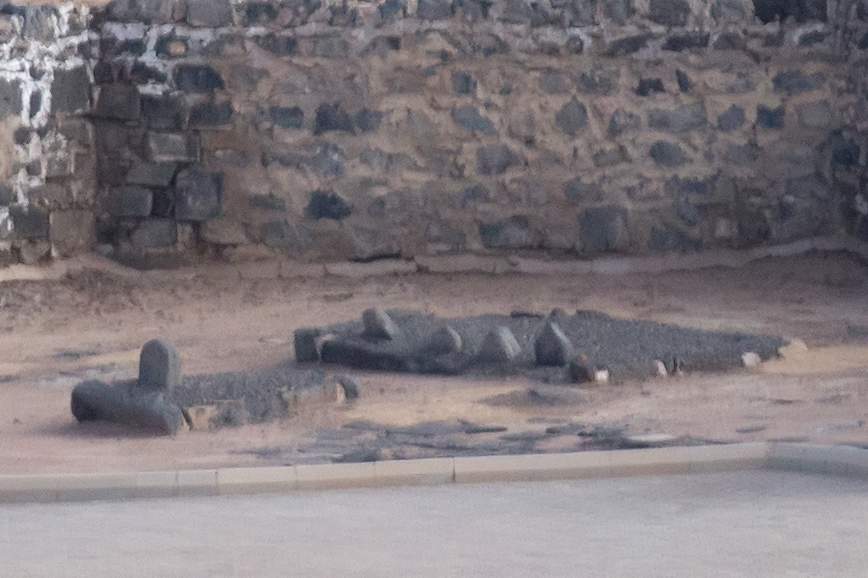
Graves of Fatimah (Note: Either Fatima bint Muhammad or Fatimah bint Asad)(single grave in front), Hasan, Zain al-Abideen, Muhammad al-Baqir and Jafar as-Sadiq and ‘Abbas ibn ‘Abd al-Muttalib

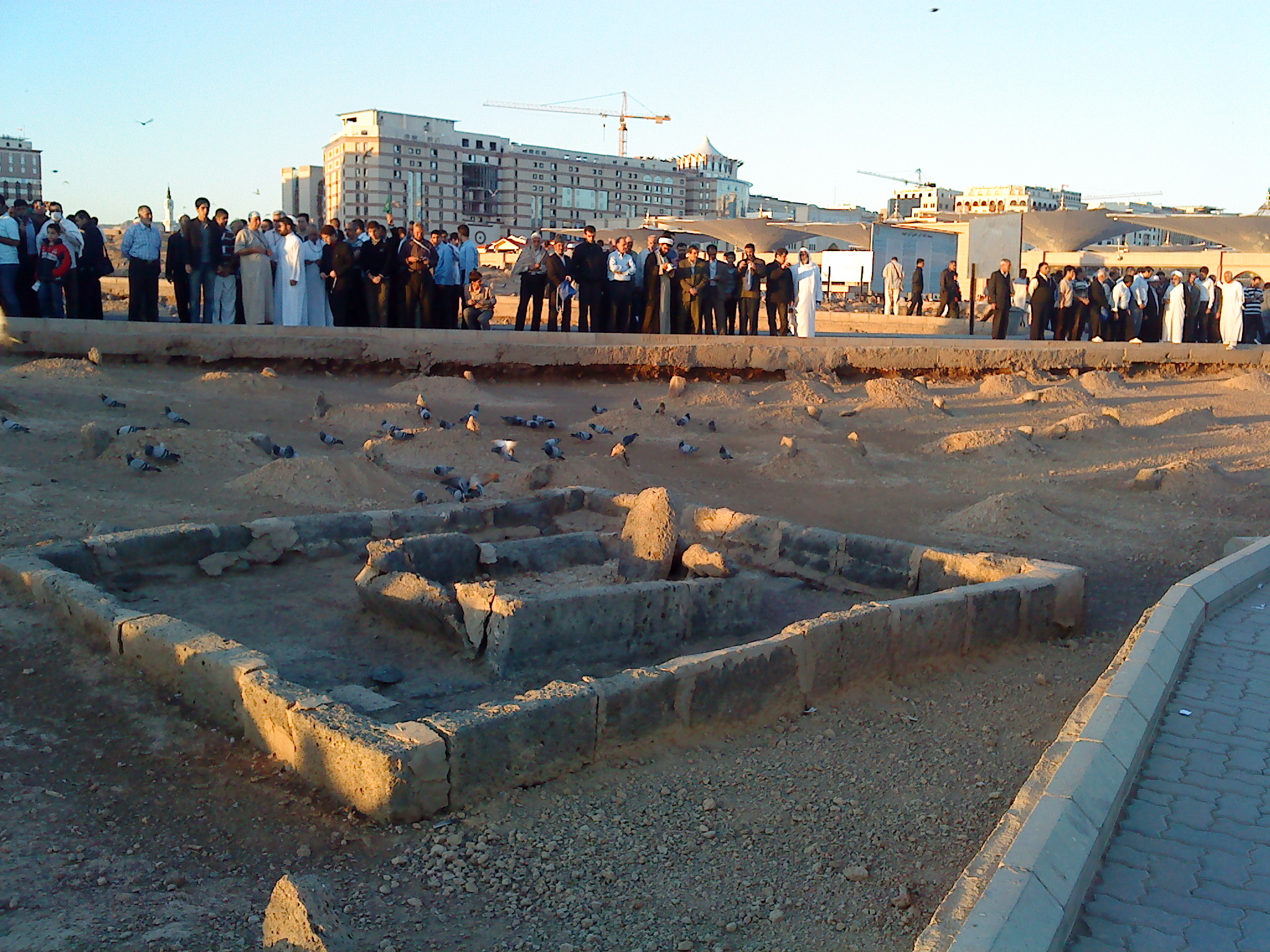
The grave of Ibrahim ibn Muhammad

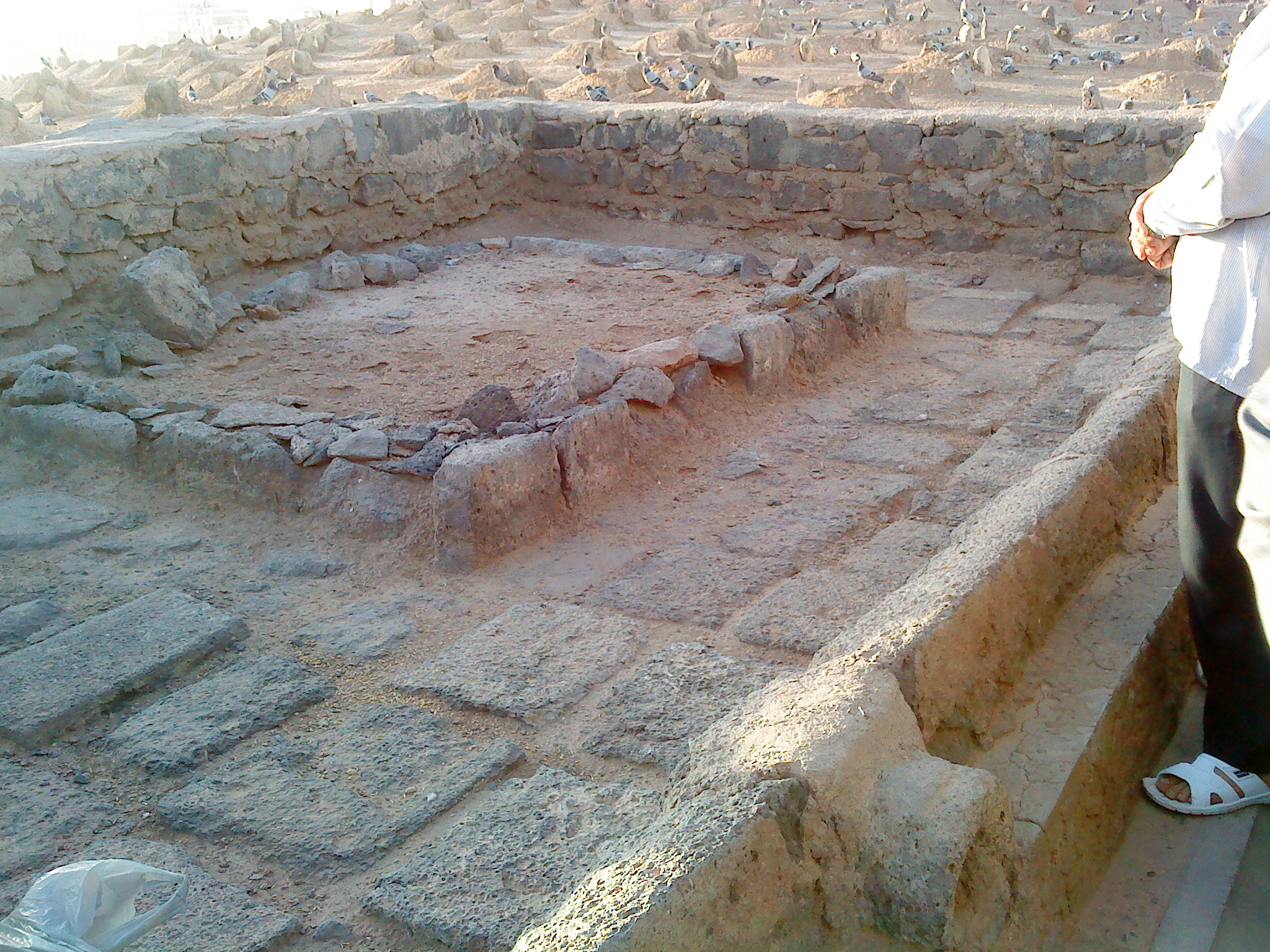
Grave of wives of Muhammad, left to right: Maria al-Qibtiyya, Juwayriyya bint al-Harith, Umm Salama, Zaynab bint Jahsh, Zaynab bint Khuzayma, Sawda bint Zamʿa, Hafsa, Safiyya bint Huyayy, Umm Habiba, Aisha.

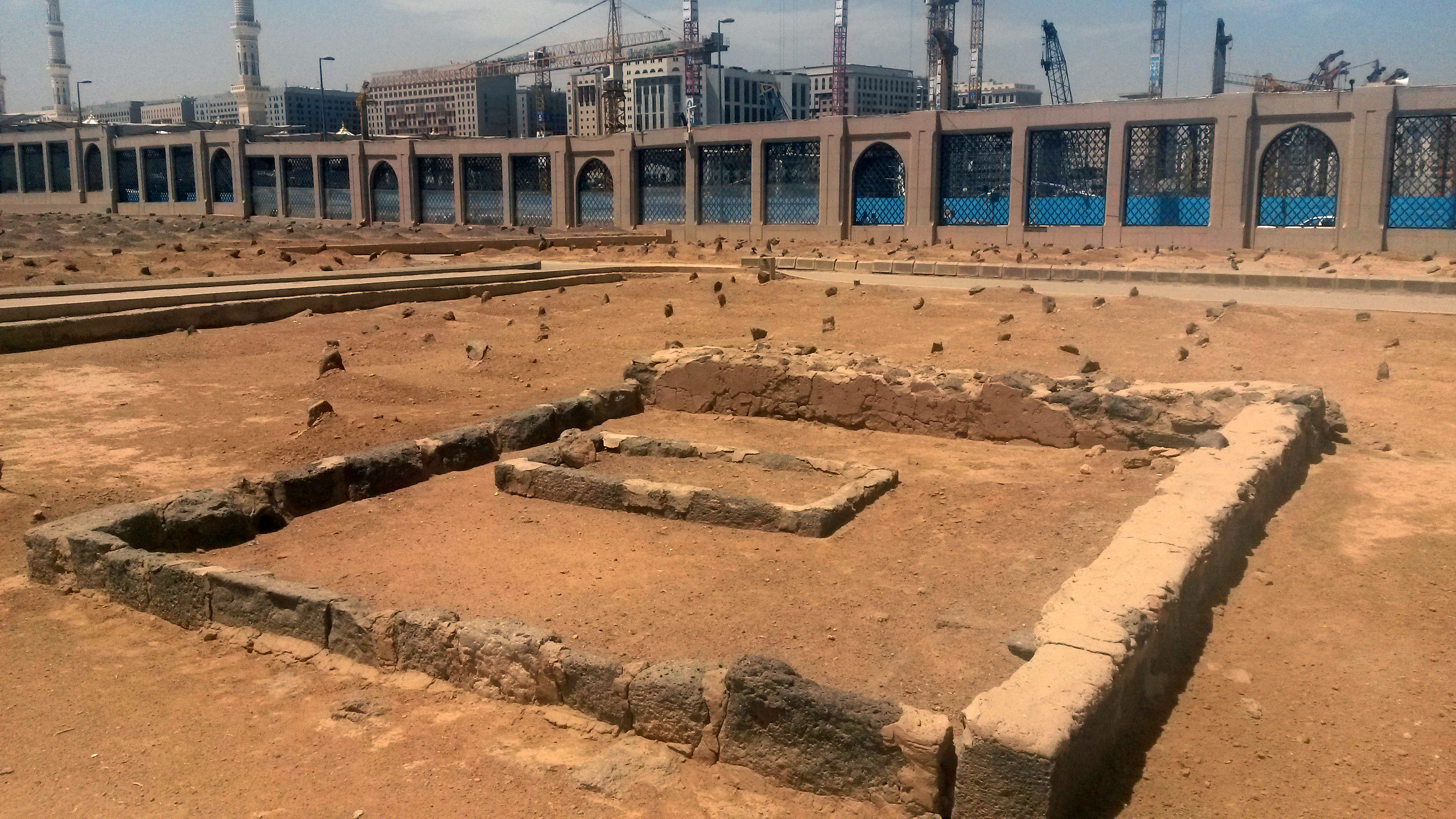
Grave of Halimah

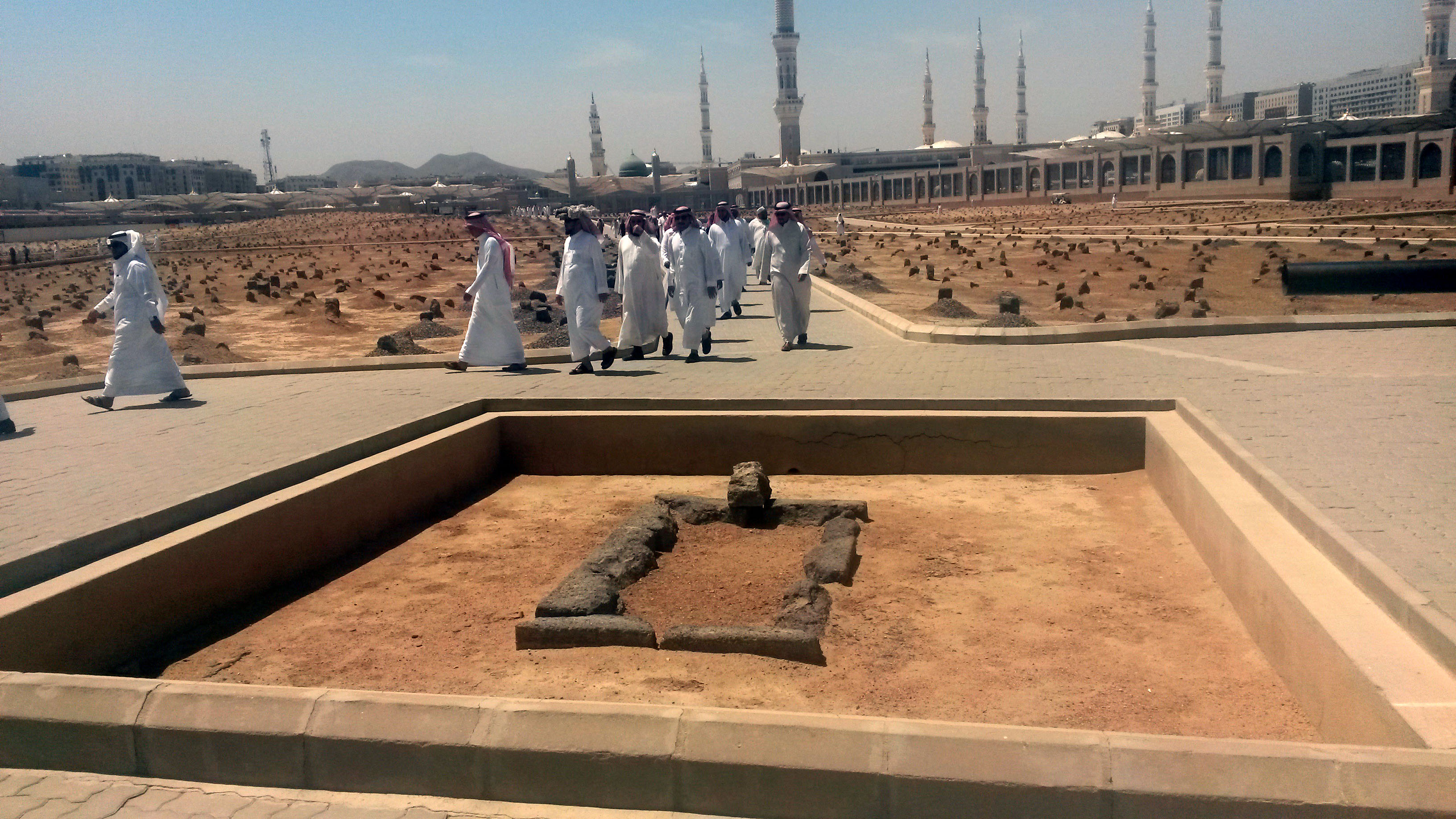
Grave of Uthman

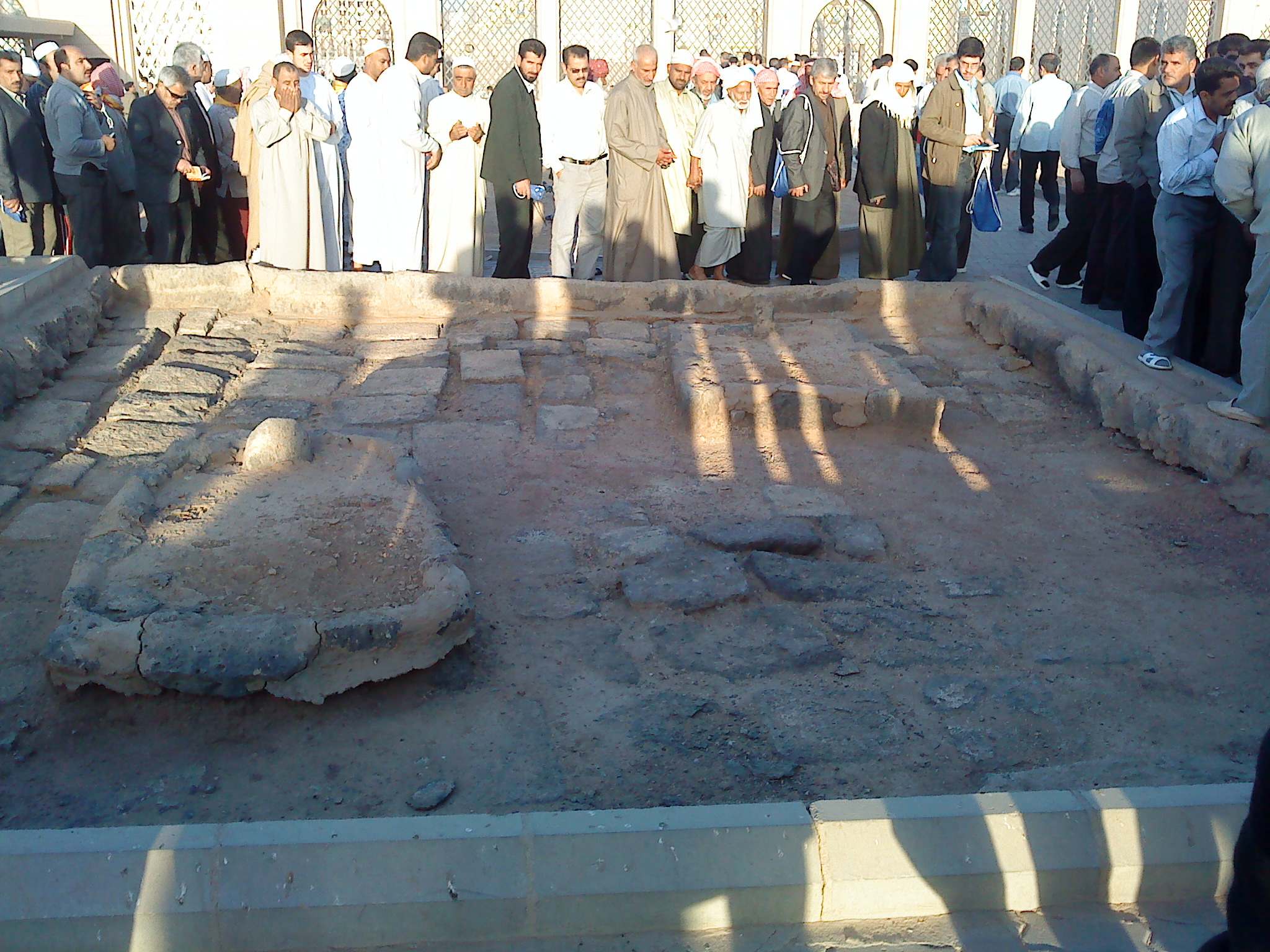
Graves of Abdullah ibn Ja'far and Aqeel ibn Abi Talib

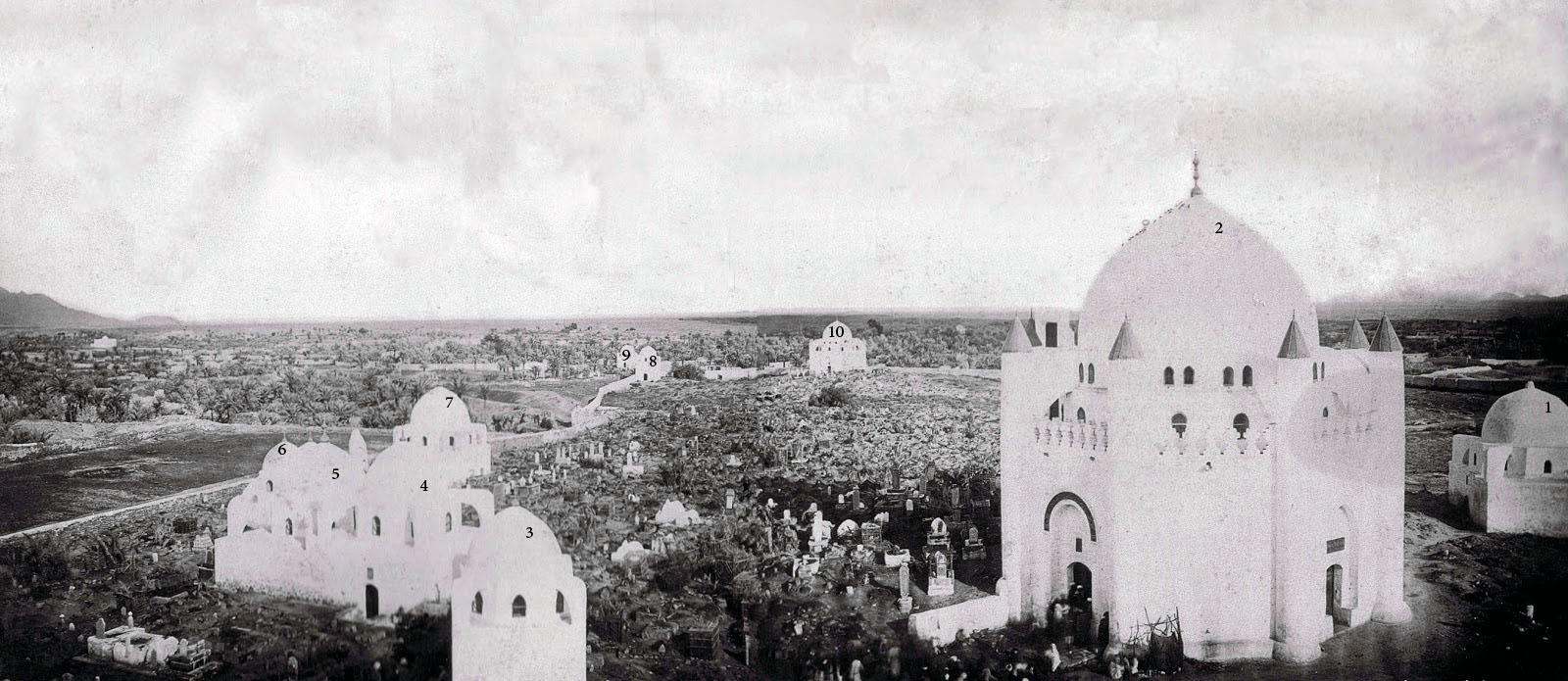
Al-Baqi Cemetery before demolition. (Note: see full article: Demolition of al-Baqi)

== Other Sources ==
- Raza Ghadeeri, Hassan (2020). Tareekh E Jannatul Baqi (in Urdu). Lahore, Pakistan: Idhara Mnahaj al-Saliheen.
- Ibn Shabba, ʿUmar ibn Shabba al-Numayri (1990). Tārīkh al-Madīna al-Munawwara (in Arabic). Beirut: Dar al-Fikr.
- al-Sakhawi, Shams al-Din Muhammad (1993). al-Tuhfa al-Latifah fi Tarikh al-Madina al-Sharifah (in Arabic). Beirut: Dar al-Kutub al-‘Ilmiyya.
- Bearman, P.; Bianquis, Th.; Bosworth, C.E.; van Donzel, E.; Heinrichs, W.P., eds. (1960–2007). Encyclopaedia of Islam, Second Edition. Leiden: Brill.
