= Samman =

Samman may refer to:

== People ==
- Muhammad as-Samman al-Madani (born 1718), a Muslim scholar who was the caretaker of the city of Medina and a founder of the Sufi Sammaniyya order
- Samman baronets, of Routh in the East Riding of the County of York, a title in the Baronetage of the United Kingdom
- Ghada al-Samman (born 1942), Syrian writer, journalist and novelist
- Henry Samman, 1st Baronet (c.1850 – 1928), British shipowner
- Josh Samman (1988–2016), American mixed martial artist

== Indian awards ==
Samman means award in Hindi and other South Asian languages. It may refer to:

- Awadh Samman, award constituted by the Government of Uttar Pradesh, to honor exceptional and meritorious contribution in their chosen field/profession
- Kalidas Samman, annual arts award presented by the government of Madhya Pradesh in India
- Pravasi Bharatiya Samman, award constituted by the Ministry of Overseas Indian Affairs, Government of India in conjunction with the Pravasi Bharatiya Divas (Non-Resident Indian Day), to honour exceptional and meritorious contribution in their chosen field/profession
- Saraswati Samman, annual award for outstanding prose or poetry literary works in any 22 Indian language listed in Schedule VIII of the Constitution of India
- Shatayu Samman, award given to persons who lived for a century, by the Government of Madhya Pradesh, India
- Shyamal Sen Smriti Samman, award given for outstanding work in Bengali art, theater and film
- Tulsi Samman, annual arts award presented by the government of Madhya Pradesh state in India
- Vyas Samman, literary award in India

== See also ==
- Sammanam (disambiguation)
- Pradhan Mantri Kisan Samman Nidhi (lit. 'Prime Minister's Farmer Welfare Scheme'), Indian farmer welfare scheme
