= Ali Abdullah Jaber =

Former Imam of Masjid al-Haram (1954–2005)

Shaykh Ali Abdullah Jaber
- علي بن عبد الله جابر
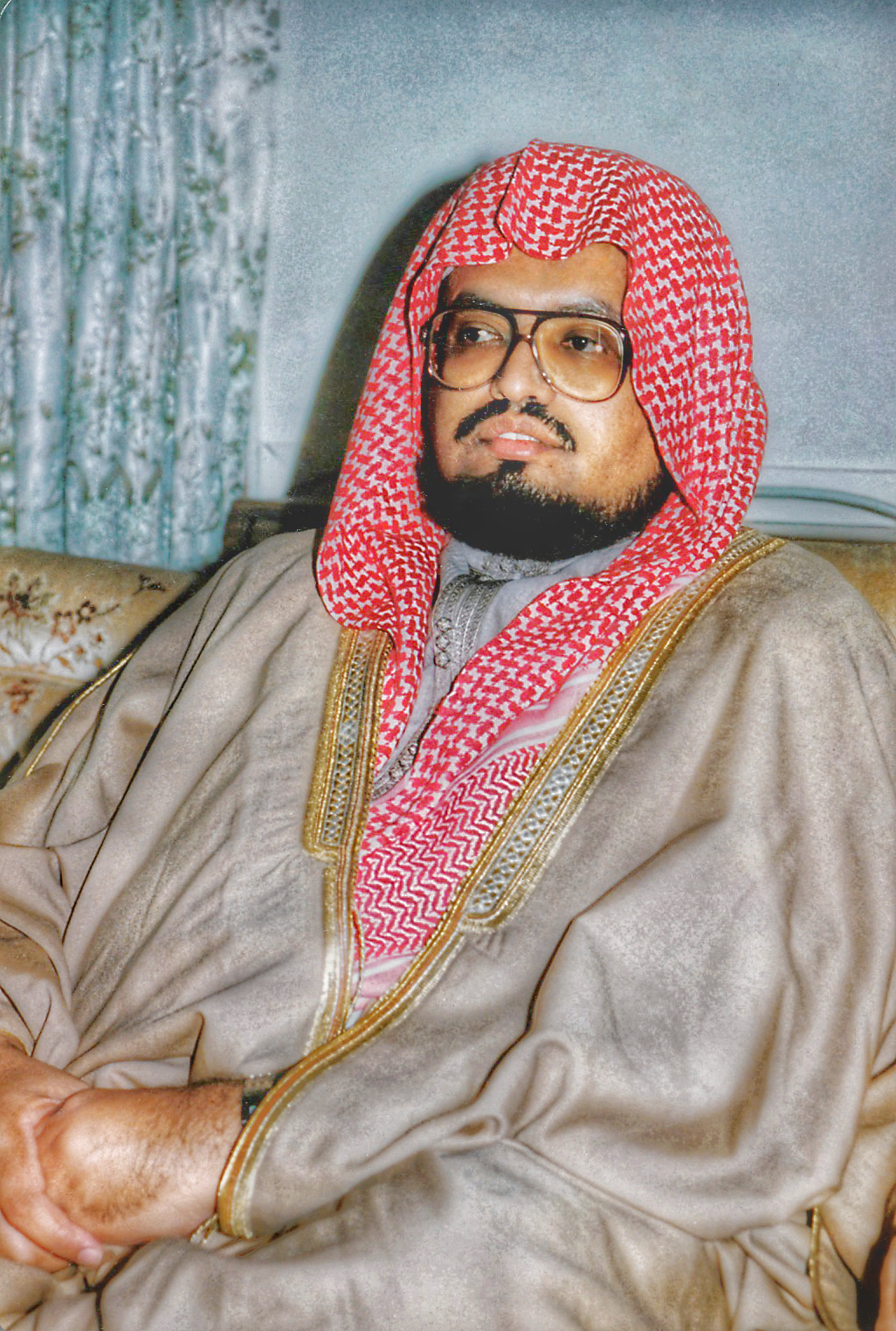
- Born: August 1954; Jeddah, Saudi Arabia
- Died: 14 December 2005 (aged 51); Jeddah, Saudi Arabia
- Resting place: Al Sharayea cemetery Makkah

Imam of Masjid Al Haram
- In office 1981–1983 (Official Imam)
- In office 1986–1989 (Ramadan guest imam)

Personal life
- Occupation: Professor and Imam
- Website: https://alijaber.net/ (Arabic)

Religious life
- Religion: Islam
- Denomination: Sunni
- Jurisprudence: Hanbali

Muslim leader
- Teacher: Khalil Al-Qari
- Students: Salah Ba'uthman
- Ali Jaber Recitation Recitation of An-Nisa verse 137-139

Ali Abdullah Saleh Ali Jaber Al-Saeedi (Note: Arabic: علي عبد الله صالح علي جابر السعيدي) (August 1954 – 14 December 2005), commonly known as Ali Jaber, was a Saudi Quran reciter, imam and an Islamic scholar. He served as Imam of the Masjid al-Haram in Mecca, Saudi Arabia and as a lecturer in comparative jurisprudence in the department of Islamic studies at King Abdulaziz University, Jeddah. He was recognised for his distinctive and melodic Quran recitation.

== Personal life ==
=== Birth and early life ===
Ali Jaber was born in August 1954 (Note: Corresponding to Dhu al-Hijjah 1373 AH) in Jeddah, Saudi Arabia, along with his twin brother Salem. At the age of 5, he and his family moved from Jeddah to Medina, where he began learning the Quran. His father, Abdullah ibn Saleh, died in Medina when Ali Jaber was 11 years old.

=== Education ===
==== Early education ====
Ali Jaber began his Quran studies under the supervision of Rahmatullah Qari in Princess Munira bint Abdul Rahman Mosque. He was later nominated to memorize the entire Quran under the guidance of Sheikh Khalil Al-Qari, at the Charitable Society for the Memorization of the Holy Quran in Medina, where he learned Tajwid (Quranic phonetics). During this period, he became acquainted with Muhammad Ayyub, who would later become an imam of the Prophet's Mosque.

==== Postgraduate education ====
After obtaining his first university degree, Ali Jaber pursued postgraduate studies at the Higher Institute of the Judiciary, in Riyadh, affiliated with Imam Muhammad bin Saud Islamic University, he enrolled in the Master's program in the academic year 1396-1397 AH.

He completed his master's degree with distinction, presenting a thesis the Department of Comparative Jurisprudence titled:

(Arabic: فقه عبد الله بن عمر ما وأثره في مدرسة المدينة, lit. 'The Jurisprudence of Abdullah bin Omar and its Impact on the School of Medina') in the Comparative Jurisprudence Department.

He later earned his doctorate in 1987, with a thesis titled:

(Arabic: فقه القاسم بن محمد بن أبي بكر الصديق موازناً بفقه أشهر المجتهدين, lit. 'The jurisprudence of Al-Qasim bin Muhammad bin Abi Bakr Al-Siddiq compared to the jurisprudence of the most famous mujtahids').

== Career as a lecturer ==
After completing his master's degree at the Higher Institute of Judiciary, Ali Jaber was offered a judgeship at the Maysan Court in Taif, which he declined for personal reasons. Although the Ministry of Justice exempted him from judicial duties, it initially required him to serve in an administrative role. He refused an appointment as an administrative inspector in Mecca, but the Ministry persisted in its assignment. Eventually, King Khalid intervened, releasing Ali Jaber from the obligation to the Ministry of Justice and appointing him as a lecturer at the College of Education, King Abdulaziz University in Medina.

== Travels ==
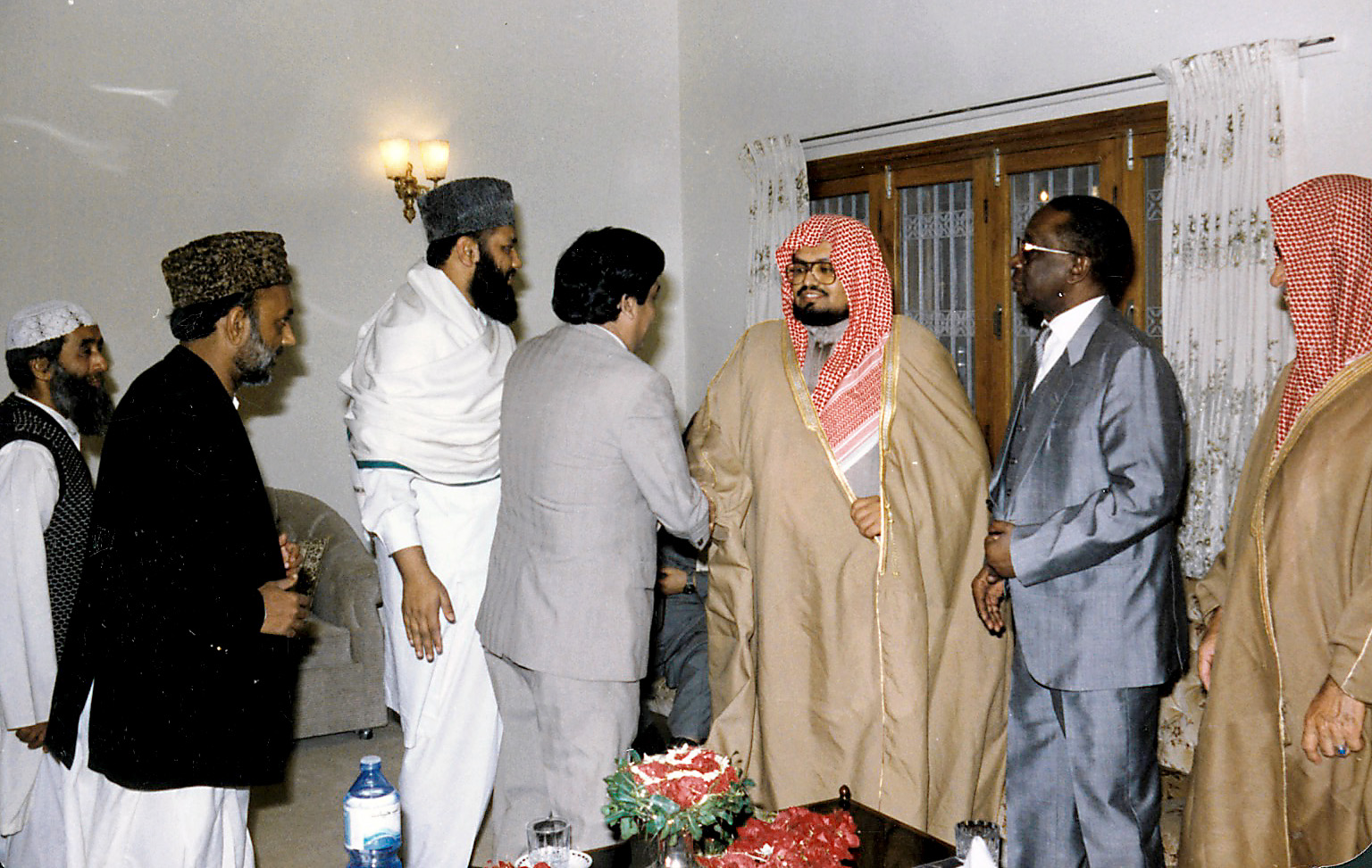
Ali Jaber during his visit to Pakistan

Throughout his life, Ali Jaber travelled to several countries, including Canada, Pakistan, Japan where he visited Arabic Islamic Institute in Tokyo.

=== Visit to Canada ===
in 1983, Ali Jaber travelled to Ottawa, the capital of Canada, for a scientific trip and remained there for 8 months. Despite suffering from health issues, he recorded the entire Quran in his voice at a recording studio in Canada, at the request of the Saudi Cultural Attaché at the time. The original copy of that registration was delivered to King Saud University in Riyadh.

== Imamate ==
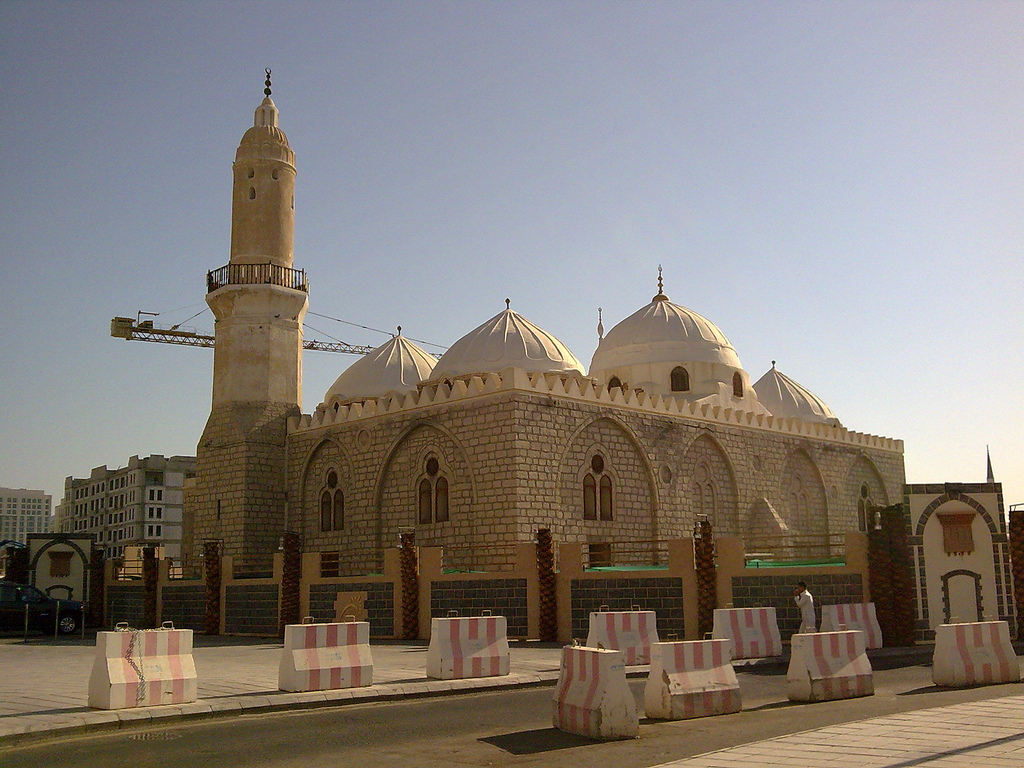
Mosque of Al-Ghamama in Medina.

=== Mosque of Al-Ghamama ===
At the request of his Sheikh, Rahmatullah Qari, Ali Jaber began his career as an Imam in 1974 (1394 AH), at the age of 21, at Mosque of Al-Ghamama in Medina. He led the worshippers to prayers there for two years.

Afterwards, he served as an imam at several Mosques before being appointed Imam of Masjid Al Haram.

=== Masjid al-Haram ===
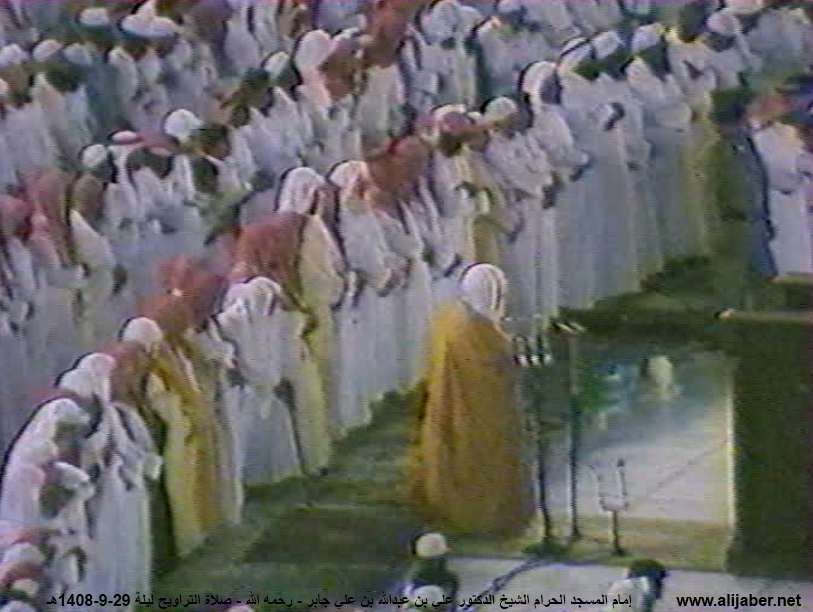
Ali Jaber leading in tarawih in Masjid al-Haram on 29 Ramadan 1408 AH (1988)

When King Khalid arrived at Mecca on the 20th night of Ramadan 1401 AH (1981), he recalled Ali Jaber's recitation, having heard him lead the tarawih prayers during the first 20 nights of Ramadan at the Khalidiya Palace Mosque in Taif. As a result, Ali Jaber was ordered to lead prayers at the Masjid al-Haram from the 23rd night of Ramadan until the end of the month. His recitation was well received by the worshippers, and he then was officially appointed as an Imam of Masjid al-Haram, at the age of 27.

He stopped leading at Masjid Al Haram in 1402 AH (1983) but returned in Ramadan as a guest imam from 1406-1409 AH (1986-1989) to lead tarawih and tahajjud. His last night of leading was tarawih on 30 Ramadan 1409 (4 May 1989).

=== Student and Legacy ===
One of Ali Jaber's notable students was Salah Ba'uthman, who later served as a guest imam at the Masjid al-Haram in 2016. His recitation style has often been described as closely resembling that of his teacher, and some listeners regard Ba'uthman’s delivery as a continuation of Ali Jaber’s distinctive approach.

== King Khalid's recognition ==
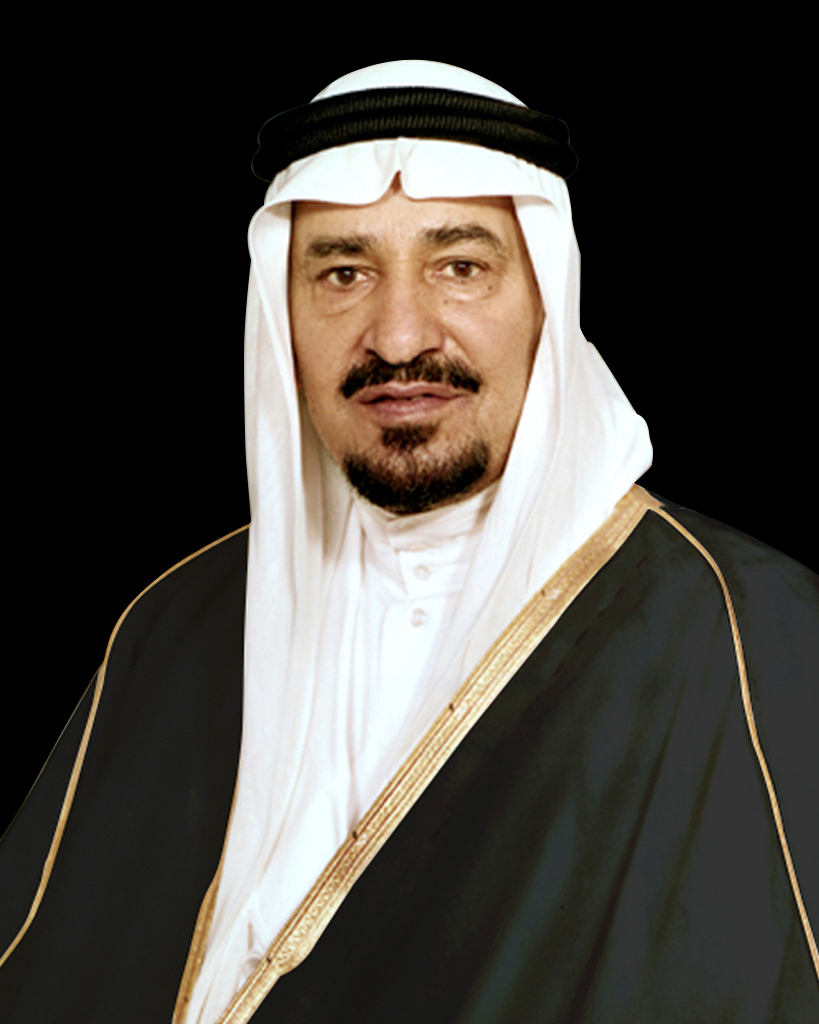
King Khalid of Saudi Arabia official portrait

Rahmatullah Qari, accompanied by Ali Jaber, often visited Taif to meet Prince Saud and Prince Saad, sons of Prince Muhammad bin Abdulaziz. During these visits, the princes would request Ali Jaber to recite verses from the Quran. On one occasion, he was invited to lead the Maghrib prayer at the Khalidiya Palace Mosque in Taif. King Khalid was reportedly pleased with Jaber's recitation and later invited him to the palace, where he honoured the visitors.

A year later, Ali Jaber was summoned to Riyadh by the Royal Court, where he delivered the Friday sermon and led King Khalid and his companions in the prayer. His sermon was well received, and the King's companions, who praised his knowledge, oratory, and the influence of Saudi university education.

In 1981 (1401 AH), Ali Jaber was appointed personal imam of the private mosque at King Khalid's palace in Taif. he led the King in daily prayers, including Tarawih during Ramadan, and accounts describe a respectful relationship between the two.

Later that year, King Khalid instructed Ali Jaber to lead Tarawih at the Masjid al-Haram during the last 10 nights of Ramadan. Following this, Ali Jaber became popularly known as the "King's Imam".

== Death ==
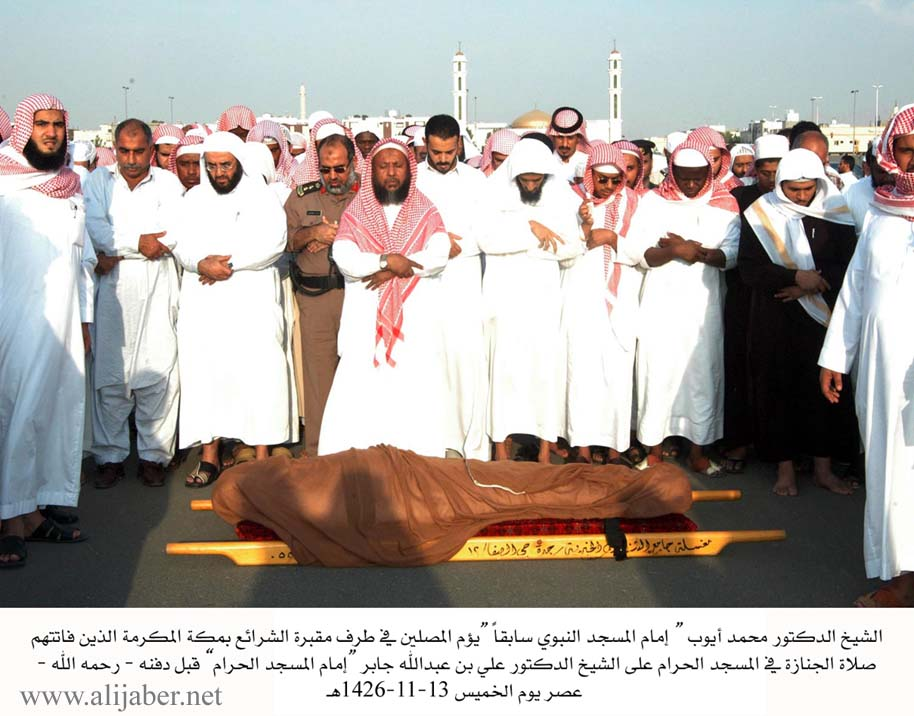
Second Funeral prayer of Ali Jaber led by Muhammad Ayyub.

Ali Jaber died after an illness at Bugshan Hospital in Jeddah on 14 December 2005. (Note: Corresponding to 12 Dhu al-Qi'dah 1426 AH) His funeral prayer was held at the Masjid al-Haram in Mecca on 15 December after the Asr prayer, led by Saleh al-Talib. A second funeral prayer was led by Muhammad Ayyub.

He was buried the same day in the Al-Sharayea cemetery in Makkah.

== See also ==
- Abdullah Matroud
