= Sammanam =

Sammanam (lit. 'Respect' or 'Honour') may refer to these Indian films:

- Sammanam (1975 film), a Malayalam film released in 1975 starring Prem Nazir and Jayabharathi
- Sammanam (1997 film), a Malayalam film released in 1997 starring Manoj K. Jayan and Manju Warrier

== See also ==
- Samman (disambiguation)
