= Khalil Al-Qari =

Sheikh of the Imams of Haramayn

Khalil Abd al-Rahman al-Qari
- خليل بن عبد الرحمن القارئ
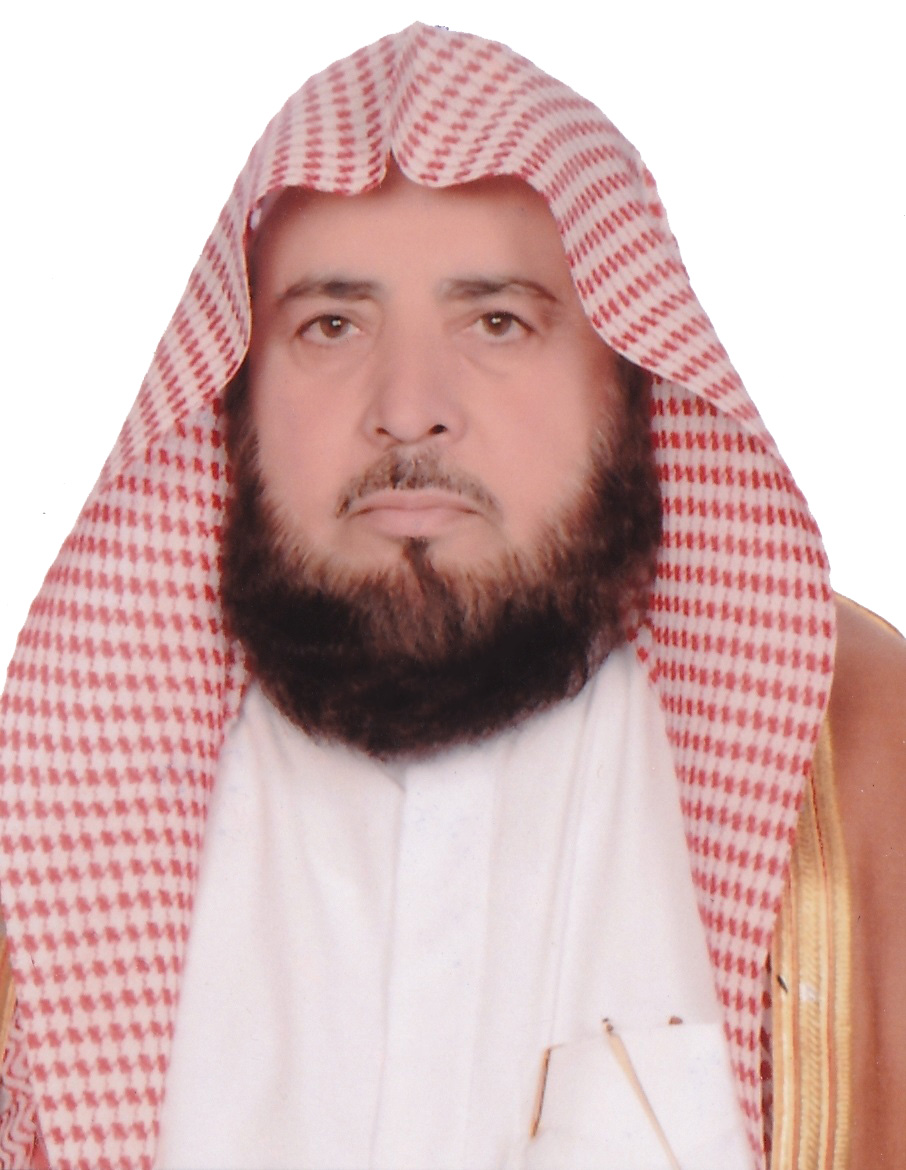
- Title: Sheikh (teacher) of the Imams of the two holy Mosques

Personal life
- Born: 1939 (1358 AH) Muzaffarabad, Azad Kashmir
- Died: 3 September 2018 (23 Dhu al-Hijjah 1439 AH) Medina, Saudi Arabia
- Resting place: Al-Baqi Cemetery
- Children: Muhammad Khalil al-Qari; Mahmoud Khalil al-Qari; Ahmad Khalil al-Qari
- Known for: Founding the modern Quranic renaissance, pioneering the Hijazi school in reciting the Quran
- Occupation: Quran teacher, Qāriʾ

Religious life
- Religion: Islam

Muslim leader
- Students: Muhammad Ayyub; Ali Jaber; Mohammad Al Subail; Mahmoud Khalil Al-Qari; Ahmad Talib Hameed; Mishari bin Rashid Alafasy; Muhammed Khalil al-Qari; Ahmad Khalil al-Qari; Mohammed Abid

Khalil bin Abd al-Rahman al-Qari (1939 - 3 September 2018) was the Sheikh of the Imams of the Two Holy Mosques, and is considered one of the founders of the modern Qur’anic renaissance.

Khalil Al-Qari was born in Muzaffarabad in 1940, and studied under Sheikh Muhammad Suleiman in Lahore, and under the reciter Anwar Al-Haq. He memorized the Qur’an from Sheikh Fadl Karim, then he studied the Qira'at on the Qura'a of Pakistan. In Pakistan he worked as a radio presenter in the Muzaffarabad region.

In 1963 he immigrated to Mecca, and studied at the Bin Laden Mosque and the Masjid al-Haram. He taught at the Grand Mosque, and the Al-Arqam bin Abi al-Arqam Institute in Al-Safa. Then he moved to Madinah, and was appointed a teacher at the Madinah Institute of the Imam Muhammad Ibn Saud Islamic University, where he settled and devoted himself to teaching the Qur’an.

He was called the "Sheikh of the Imams of the Two Holy Mosques"; In reference to the fact that six of his former students served as Imams of the Great Mosque of Mecca, along with other well-known students, including Sheikh Muhammad Ayyub and Sheikh Ali Abdullah Jaber.

He is considered the pioneer of the Hijazi school in reciting the Qur’an, and one of the founders who participated in the establishment of charitable societies for the memorization of the Qur’an in Saudi Arabia. He is the father of Muhammad and Mahmoud, the Imams of the Prophet's Mosque.

== List of prominent students ==
Khalil al-Qari's students included a number of Quranreciters, some of whom later served as Imams in the two holy mosques and became recognized scholars of recitation. Among them were:

1. Muhammad Ayyub – One of the closest students who accompanied Khalil Al-Qari for years since childhood. He became Imam of Prophet's Mosque, Quba Mosque and various other mosques in Medina.
2. Ali Abdullah Jaber – A former Imam of Masjid al-Haram. Also one of the closest students between Khalil Al-Qari.
3. Mohammad Al Subail – A former and long standing Imam of Masjid al-Haram.
4. Muhammed Khalil al-Qari – His son and former Imam of Masjid Quba.
5. Mahmoud Khalil Al-Qari – Another son and Imam of Masjid al-Qiblatayn.
6. Ahmad Khalil al-Qari – Another son. He led at various mosques in Madina including Masjid al-Qiblatayn.
7. Mohammed Abid – Previous Imam of Masjid Nabawi and Masjid Quba.
8. Ahmad Talib Hamid – Former Imam of Masjid Nabawi.
9. Mishari Rashid al-Afasi – The famous reciter and Imam of the Grand Mosque in Kuwait.

== Death ==
He died on Monday 23 Dhu al-Hijjah 1439 AH (corresponding to September 3, 2018), in Medina, at the age of 78, and was buried in Al-Baqi Cemetery.
