= Salah Ba'uthman =

Saudi Quranic scholar and university academic

Shaykh Salah Ba'uthman
- صلاح باعثمان
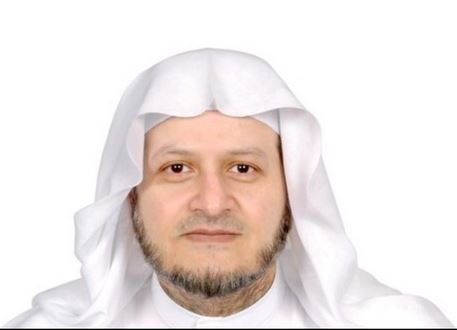

Guest Imam at Masjid al-Haram
- In office 2016 and 2017 (Ramadan only)

Personal life
- Born: Jeddah, Saudi Arabia
- Education: Bachelor's in Islamic studies (King Abdulaziz University); Master's in Tafsir; PhD in Tafsir (Umm al-Qura University)
- Occupation: Imam & Khatib of Masjid Abu Bakr as Siddiq, Jeddah

Religious life
- Religion: Islam
- Profession: Assistant Professor in the Department of Quran Studies

Muslim leader
- Teacher: Ali Abdullah Jaber

Salah bin Salem Baʿuthman (Arabic: صلاح بن سالم باعثمان) is a Saudi Quranic scholar, university academic and Quran reciter who has served as a guest imam (assigned to lead Tarawih) at Masjid al-Haram in Mecca. He is known for his melodious recitation of the Qur’an, which resembles that of Ali Abdullah Jaber.

== Education ==
Ba'uthman completed undergraduate studies in Islamic Studies and then advanced to graduate work in tafsir (Quranic exegesis). Sources report a Bachelor’s degree in Islamic Studies from King Abdulaziz University and both a Master’s degree and a PhD in tafsīr from Umm al-Qura University.

== Academic career ==
Ba'uthman has held academic posts in the field of Quranic studies. He has served as a faculty member and department head in Quranic/Islamic studies at major Saudi universities and according to university press items and local press has been involved in organizing Quranic competitions and academic programmes. He served at King Abdulaziz University (as senior member of the Department of Quranic Studies) and later as dean of colleges of Quran and Islamic Studies at other Saudi universities.

=== Recitations and published work ===
Ba'uthman is widely known for recorded Quran recitations (complete and partial Mus'haf-style recordings), televised series and short programmes in which he delivers verse-by-verse tafsir (exegesis) or reflections.

Ba'uthman was appointed as a guest imam to lead Tarawih prayers at Masjid al-Haram in Mecca during Ramadan in 2016 and 2017, an appointment publicly announced in Saudi media and reported by regional news outlets.
