= Ahmad Talib Hameed =

Saudi Islamic scholar and Imam (born 1981)

Ahmad Talib Hameed Khan
- أحمد بن طالب حميد

Imam at Prophet's Mosque
- In office 2013–2025

Personal life
- Born: 1981 (age 44–45) Riyadh
- Education: Faculty of Sharia (College of Sharia) Imam Muhammad Ibn Saud Islamic University; King Abdulaziz University (Ph.D)

Religious life
- Religion: Islam
- Profession: Imam Khatib

Ahmad bin Talib bin Abd al-Hameed bin Muzaffar Khan (Arabic: أحمد بن طالب بن عبد الحميد حميد; born 1401 AH / 1981 CE) is a Saudi Arabian imam and qāriʾ. He served as an imam and khatib of the Prophet’s Mosque in Medina, Saudi Arabia, from 2013 until 2025.

It is confirmed that he is not jailed, due to people spotting him in the Prophet's Mosque praying behind the other imams.

== Early life and education ==
Ahmad Talib Hameed was born in Riyadh, Saudi Arabia, in 1981 (1401 AH). His maternal grandfather, Abd al-Majid bin Hasan al-Jabarti, was also an imam of the Prophet’s Mosque and played a formative role in his upbringing. During his youth, Hameed frequently attended his grandfather’s scholarly gatherings in Medina.

He memorized the Qurʾān at an early age and received ijāzah in Qurʾānic recitation. He pursued higher education at Imam Muhammad ibn Saud Islamic University in Riyadh, where he graduated from the Faculty of Sharia. He later completed a master’s degree at the Higher Institute of Judiciary in the field of Comparative Jurisprudence (Fiqh al-Muqāran).

in 2026, he obtained a doctoral degree from the King Abdulaziz University.

== Career ==
Hameed was appointed as an imam of al-Masjid an-Nabawi in 2013 CE. He first led Tarāwīḥ and Tahajjud prayers during Ramadan of that year and subsequently became a regular imam.

Ahmad Talib Hameed

Alongside his work as an imam, he has participated in academic and religious activities in Saudi Arabia, with a focus on Islamic jurisprudence.

=== Removal from post ===
In May 2025, reports noted that Hameed’s name was no longer listed among the official imams of al-Masjid an-Nabawi. His absence was highlighted during the last ten nights of Ramadan that year. The General Presidency of Haramain did not issue a detailed public explanation.

== See also ==
- Abdulmohsen Al-Qasim
- List of current and former Imams of Prophet's Mosque
