= Samman baronets =

Extinct baronetcy in the Baronetage of the United Kingdom

The Samman Baronetcy, of Routh in the East Riding of the County of York, was a title in the Baronetage of the United Kingdom. It was created on 19 January 1921 for the shipowner Henry Samman. The title became extinct on the death of the second Baronet in 1960.

== Samman baronets, of Routh (1921) ==
- Sir Henry Samman, 1st Baronet (1850–1928)
- Sir Henry Samman, 2nd Baronet (1881–1960)
