= Saleh Al-Talib =

Ex-Imam Masjid al-Haram

Sheikh Saleh Al-Talib
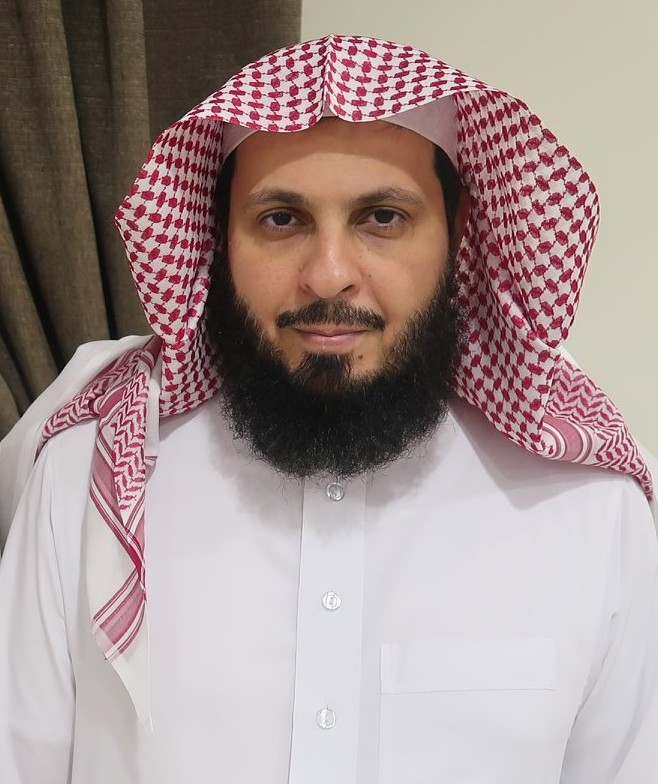
- Saleh Al-Talib in 2018
- Born: January 23, 1974 (age 52); Saudi Arabia
- Occupations: Scholar, preacher, Imam, Khatib, judge
- Known for: Imprisoned for "criticizing the government"

Sheikh Saleh bin Mohammed Al Talib (Arabic: صالح آل طالب; born 23 January 1974), is a Saudi scholar, Sunni Imam, Khatib and judge who has been imprisoned since August 2018 for expressing religious views criticizing Saudi government policies. After overturning a previous acquittal in 2022, the Specialised Criminal Appeals Court overturned the acquittal and sentenced Talib to ten years in custody.

Sheikh Al-Talib was the Imam and Khatib of Al-Masjid al-Haram and was also serving as a judge in District Court in Makkah.

In March 2018, Sheikh Talib visited Pakistan where he met with officials such as then President Mamnoon Hussain and Army Chief Qamar Javed Bajwa. He was appointed imam in 2002. He participated to lead Tarawih in 2003. He often got to led Isha prayers, and the last prayer that he led was Isha, and he recited Surah Al-Munafiqun.

In September 2025, he was released from prison and is under house arrest as known so far.
