= Haramain Sharifain =

Online blog

- Publication types: 'Inside the Haramain'
- Nonfiction topics: Two Holy Mosques
- No. of employees: 7
- Official website: www.insharifain.com

Haramain Sharifain is an English social blog published online. Its target audience is those with interest in the Two Holy Mosques. It is one of the largest sources of English Haramain-related content and is often quoted by major news outlets.

In August 2022, Haramain Sharifain launched its Urdu and Pashto Service to cater its audiences in the subcontinent.

As of August 2022, Haramain Sharifain has over 3 million followers on major Social media platforms. Its subsidiary 'Inside the Haramain' publishes News and Information from the Two Holy Mosques.
