= Islamic University of Madinah =

University in Madinah, Saudi Arabia

- الجامعة الإسلامية بالمدينة المنورة; Jāmiʻah al-Islāmīyah bi-al-Madīnah al-Munawwarah
- Motto: الجامعة التي لا تغيب عنها الشمس
- Type: Public
- Established: 1961; 65 years ago
- Religious affiliation: Islam
- Students: 22,000
- Location: Medina, Saudi Arabia; 24°28′50″N 39°33′53″E
- Website: iu.edu.sa/en-us (in Arabic)

The Islamic University of Madinah is a public Islamic university in Medina, Saudi Arabia, established by Royal Decree No. 11 on 25 Rabīʿ al-Awwal 1381 AH (1961). The university states that its studies began in the same year and that its founding legislation established its initial academic structure.

The university has been associated by academic scholars with the Salafi tradition and with the international dissemination of Saudi religious scholarship. Its early administration was closely connected with the Saudi religious establishment. The university's first president was Saudi Arabia's Grand Mufti, Muḥammad ibn Ibrāhīm Āl al-Shaykh, while ʿAbd al-ʿAzīz ibn Bāz served as his deputy and was regarded as the de facto administrator of the university during its early years. Following Muḥammad ibn Ibrāhīm's death in 1969, Ibn Bāz became president and remained in the position until 1975.

After Ibn Bāz left the presidency in 1975, ʿAbd al-Muḥsin al-ʿAbbād, who had taught at the university since its early years and had served as Ibn Bāz's deputy, assumed a leading role in its administration. The ḥadīth scholar Muḥammad Nāṣir al-Dīn al-Albānī also taught at the university during its early years and also donated a part of his library to the university's maktabah (library).

Rabīʿ ibn Hādī al-Madkhalī also studied at the Islamic University of Madinah and later taught at its Faculty of Hadith. He subsequently became head of the Sunnah Studies Department at the university.

== Colleges and academic programs ==
The Islamic University of Madinah offers programs in Islamic and Arabic studies as well as in law, business, computing, engineering, natural sciences, applied studies, and languages. Its Islamic-studies disciplines remain a major part of the university's academic structure, while its academic offerings have expanded over time to include scientific and professional fields.

=== Islamic studies ===
The university's Islamic-studies disciplines include Sharia, Qur'anic studies, Hadith, and Creed and Da'wah. The university describes Sharia and Islamic studies as among the fundamental pillars upon which the institution was founded, with these disciplines distributed among several specialized colleges.

==== College of Sharia ====
The College of Sharia was established in 1381 AH (1961), the same year as the university. It developed from the university's original higher section, which formed the first nucleus of the college. Instruction began with 85 students. The college includes studies in Islamic jurisprudence, the principles of jurisprudence and Islamic economics.

==== College of the Holy Qur'an and Islamic Studies ====
The College of the Holy Qur'an and Islamic Studies was established by Royal Decree No. 26511 in 1394 AH (1974). The university describes it as the first college of its kind in the Islamic world. A distinctive requirement for admission to the college is the complete memorization of the Qur'an. The college specializes in Qur'anic recitation, tafsir and the sciences of the Qur'an and has offered study to students from numerous countries.

The Qur'an memorization requirement is also stated in the university's current admission information, which specifies that applicants to the College of the Holy Qur'an must have memorized the entire Qur'an and pass the designated examination.

==== College of Hadith and Islamic Studies ====
The College of Hadith and Islamic Studies was established by Royal Decree No. 15653 in 1396 AH (1976). It began with two academic departments: Hadith Sciences and Fiqh al-Sunnah and its Sources. The college specializes in the study of the Prophetic Sunnah and its sciences and offers bachelor's, master's and doctoral programs.

The Department of Hadith Sciences covers disciplines including hadith terminology, the authentication and classification of hadith, takhrij, the study of chains of transmission, al-jarh wa al-ta'dil, the study of hadith narrators and the study of fabricated hadith. The college also offers postgraduate programs in Hadith Sciences and Fiqh al-Sunnah.

==== College of Creed and Da'wah ====
The College of Creed and Da'wah, originally established as the College of Da'wah and Fundamentals of Religion, was established in 1386 AH (1966). Its fields include Islamic creed, da'wah, Islamic culture and related disciplines. The university currently offers bachelor's, master's and doctoral programs through the college, including programs in Creed and Da'wah, Islamic Creed, Da'wah, sects and creeds, and religions and intellectual schools of thought.

The university's description of the bachelor's program in Creed and Da'wah states that the program aims to teach the creed of Ahl al-Sunnah wa al-Jama'ah, develop students' understanding of the sources and methodologies of creed and da'wah, and prepare them to study and respond to differing schools of thought, sects and parties.

=== Arabic and humanities ===
==== College of Arabic Language and Humanities ====
The College of Arabic Language was established by Royal Decree No. DM/70 in 1395 AH (1975). Its academic departments include Linguistics, Literature and Rhetoric, Media and Communication Sciences, History and Civilization, and Education. The college offers undergraduate and postgraduate study in these fields and also contributes to Arabic-language instruction across the university.

The university also operates an Institute for Teaching Arabic to Non-Native Speakers, established in the 1386/1387 AH academic year. The institute was established to provide Arabic-language instruction to students who are not native speakers of Arabic.

=== Law and business ===
==== College of Law and Judicial Studies ====
The College of Law and Judicial Studies was established as a separate college in 1440 AH (2019). It was formed from the former Law and Judicial Studies departments of the College of Sharia and includes departments of Law and Judicial Studies.

==== College of Business ====
The College of Business provides academic programs in economics, finance, accounting and business administration. Its programs combine theoretical study with practical applications and are intended to prepare graduates for professional work and further study.

=== Scientific and technical studies ===
The university has expanded beyond its original Islamic and Arabic studies to include scientific and technical disciplines. Its current scientific and technical colleges include Computing and Information Systems, Engineering and Science.

==== College of Computing and Information Systems ====
The College of Computing and Information Systems began its academic development in 1434 AH (2013). It offers programs in Computer Science, Information Technology and Information Systems. The college states that its three bachelor's programs have received ABET accreditation in engineering and technology.

The university also offers postgraduate study in areas including data science, information technology and security technologies.

==== College of Engineering ====
The College of Engineering is one of the university's newer scientific colleges. It began offering its academic programs in the 1434/1435 AH academic year. Its current bachelor's programs include Electrical Engineering, Mechanical Engineering and Civil Engineering, while its postgraduate programs include Engineering and Technology Management and Renewable Energy.

==== College of Science ====
The College of Science was approved for establishment in 1431 AH (2010) and began its academic activity in the 1433/1434 AH academic year. It includes departments of Mathematics, Physics and Chemistry and offers bachelor's degrees in these disciplines. It also offers postgraduate programs, including master's degrees in Mathematics, Physics and Chemistry and a professional master's degree in Industrial Laboratories.

The university has subsequently expanded the scientific programs available through the college to include areas such as Environmental Sciences and Financial and Actuarial Mathematics.

==== Other colleges and recent expansion ====
The university also includes an Applied College, which offers applied academic and training programs, and a College of Languages and Translation, established in 1447 AH (2026). The latter represents a recent expansion of the university's academic offerings beyond its traditional Islamic and Arabic-language fields.

The university's current academic structure therefore encompasses a wide range of disciplines, from Qur'anic studies, Hadith, Sharia, creed and Da'wah to Arabic language, law, business, computing, engineering, mathematics, physics, chemistry and other applied fields.

== Academics and Admissions ==
Undergraduate admissions to the Islamic University of Madinah are managed through the Saudi Ministry of Education's scholarship system. Scholarships are available to international male Muslim applicants who hold recognized secondary education qualifications, meet specific age criteria, and demonstrate proficiency or background in Islamic studies where required. Candidates applying to specialized faculties, such as the Faculty of the Holy Qur'an, are required to have memorized the Qur'an and pass an entrance examination.

== Distance learning ==
The Islamic University of Madinah also provides distance-learning and online education. The university established its Deanship of Distance Education in 1428 AH (2007–2008), which was later reorganized and became the E-Learning Center in 1447 AH (2025–2026). The center develops and delivers online university courses, academic programs, micro-credentials and other digital learning opportunities, with particular emphasis on Islamic sciences and knowledge.

The university's distance-learning system is available to international learners and allows students to study individual university courses online and obtain course-completion certificates and micro-credentials. These qualifications can be accumulated and, subject to the university's admission requirements and regulations, applied toward progressively higher academic qualifications. The university currently describes a stackable pathway consisting of an Associate Diploma requiring at least 30 academic units, an Intermediate Diploma requiring at least 60 academic units, and a Bachelor's degree requiring at least 145 academic units.

The academic fields currently available through the stackable distance-learning system include Sharia, the Holy Qur'an, Islamic Creed and Da'wah, Prophetic Hadith, Arabic Language, Legal Studies (Regulations), and Economics. The Qur'an pathway also includes an Associate Diploma in the Seven Qira'at (recitations).

The university maintains a separate admissions portal for distance-learning programs for students residing outside Saudi Arabia. Its admissions information states that the distance-learning programs are conducted online rather than on campus and that tuition fees apply. Arabic-language proficiency is also required for admission to the currently advertised international distance-learning program.

The university has also published admission guides for individual distance-learning programs, including a Bachelor of Sharia through distance education, an Associate Diploma in the Seven Qira'at for international students residing outside Saudi Arabia, and online university courses for international male and female students.

- Letters (Tazkiyah): Issued by recognized Islamic institutions, foundation heads, or prominent Muslim scholars in the applicant's country of residence.
- Personal Photograph: A recent passport-sized color photograph taken against a plain white background.

=== Optional and Supplemental Documents ===
While not strictly required for basic application submission, providing supplemental documentation can strengthen an applicant's profile during evaluation:

- Shahadah / Certificate of Islam: An official certificate verifying conversion to Islam (applicable only to those who were not born into Muslim families).
- Quran Memorization Certificate (Ijaza): Formal certifications verifying partial or complete memorization of the Quran.
- Language Proficiency Certificates: Standardized tests such as TOEFL or IELTS for scientific programs taught in English, or Arabic proficiency credentials.
- National Identity Card: Government-issued identity document from the applicant's home country.
- Certificates of Achievement: Supplementary certificates demonstrating extracurricular achievements, Islamic studies coursework, or community leadership.

== Benefits of Studying at Islamic Academic Institutions ==
The fully funded scholarship system offered by public Islamic universities—most notably the Islamic University of Madinah in Saudi Arabia—provides comprehensive academic, spiritual, and financial support for international students. Designed to attract global talent, these institutions offer a combination of access to prominent scholars alongside full living and travel provisions.

=== Spiritual and Academic Benefits ===
==== Direct Access to Scholars ====
One of the primary non-material advantages for students of Islamic sciences is the opportunity to sit in close proximity to prominent Islamic scholars and jurists ('ulamā'). Beyond regular classroom lectures, students often attend traditional study circles (halaqāt) held in major places of worship, such as Al-Masjid an-Nabawi (The Prophet's Mosque). This environment allows students to receive direct instruction, academic mentorship, and classical certifications (ijāzāt) directly from recognized authorities in Islamic jurisprudence, Hadith, and Quranic recitation.

==== Daily Transportation to Sacred Sites ====
Universities situated in holy cities frequently provide complimentary, daily scheduled bus transportation between the main academic campus and major religious landmarks. This allows students to perform daily prayers, attend evening lectures, and study at historic sites without incurring personal transit costs.

=== Financial and Administrative Support ===
==== Monthly Stipends ====
Admitted international students on full government scholarships receive a regular monthly allowance (Mukafa'ah) to cover baseline personal expenses throughout the duration of their academic program.

- Standard Allowance: The stipend is set at approximately 850 Saudi Riyals (SAR) per month (roughly $225 USD). It runs continuously each month, including during academic breaks and official university holidays, provided the student remains enrolled in good standing.
- Academic Excellence Bonuses: Students who achieve exceptional Grade Point Averages (GPAs)—typically an "Excellent" (Mumtaz) ranking—are often awarded an additional monetary bonus equivalent to an extra month’s stipend (850 SAR).
- Setup and Graduation Allowances: Scholarship packages typically include a one-time lump-sum arrival allowance upon initial enrollment to assist with settling in, as well as a dedicated book-shipping allowance provided upon successful graduation.

==== Visa and Vacation Airfare Provisions ====
The host institution manages student residency visas and handles all required legal permissions for foreign nationals.

- Round-Trip Holiday Tickets: At the end of each academic year, the university provides full-coverage, round-trip flight tickets to the student's home country.
- Continuous Stipends During Leave: The monthly 850 SAR allowance continues to be deposited into the student’s bank account while they are away on official university summer vacation.
- Exit and Re-entry Visas: The university issues and covers the administrative logistics and fees for student exit and re-entry visas required for international travel during holidays.

=== Campus Life and Amenities ===
==== Free Furnished Housing ====
Unmarried international students are allocated free on-campus dormitory accommodation.

- Room Furnishings: Dormitories come pre-furnished with essential furniture, including beds, study desks, wardrobes, and air conditioning.
- Included Utilities: Standard utilities such as water, electricity, and campus Wi-Fi access are fully subsidized by the institution.

==== Subsidized Dining Facilities ====
Universities operate central dining halls and cafeterias that provide low-cost meals to the student body.

- Pricing Structure: Students pay a nominal fraction of the actual food cost per meal (often ranging between 1 to 3 Saudi Riyals, or less than $1 USD per meal), with the remaining balance subsidized by the university budget.
- Dietary Options: Dining centers provide culturally diverse, nutritionally balanced, and certified Halal meal options daily.

==== Health Care and Auxiliary Services ====
Scholarship packages extend to basic healthcare, wellness, and campus services:

- Medical Care: Students are granted free comprehensive medical and emergency dental treatment at dedicated university hospitals and campus clinics.
- Recreational Facilities: Free access to campus sports complexes, including soccer fields, running tracks, swimming pools, and indoor gymnasiums.
- Library Access: Full borrowing privileges at central campus libraries, housing extensive collections of digital databases, classical manuscripts, and modern research texts.

== Notable scholars and faculty ==
The Islamic University of Madinah has been served by prominent Salafi scholars, jurists, and theologians who have served as university presidents, department heads, or long-standing professors:

- Abd al-Aziz ibn Baz – Former Vice-President (1961–1970) and President (1970–1975) of the University; former Grand Mufti of Saudi Arabia.
- Muhammad Nasiruddin al-Albani – Renowned 20th-century Hadith scholar; former professor of Hadith sciences at the university (1961–1963).
- Hammad al-Ansari – Classical Hadith scholar and long-time lecturer at the university's Higher Institute of Da'wah.
- Abdul-Muhsin al-Abbad – Former Vice-President of the university and prominent scholar of Hadith who taught at the Prophet's Mosque for decades.
- Salih al-Fawzan – Senior member of the Council of Senior Scholars who has served on university examination committees and academic boards.
- Abdul-Aziz ibn Abdullah Al Shaykh – Grand Mufti of Saudi Arabia; served on university academic and governance boards.
- Salih al-Luhaydan – Former head of the Supreme Judicial Council of Saudi Arabia and senior lecturer connected to the university's academic circles.
- Ibrahim ibn Muhammad Al ash-Sheikh – Former Minister of Justice of Saudi Arabia who supported and overseen university initiatives.
- Saleh Al al-Sheikh – Former Saudi Minister of Islamic Affairs and member of the university's supreme council.

== Notable alumni ==
The university's international alumni network includes prominent scholars, community leaders, and theologians across the globe:

- Muhammad Ayyub – Renowned Qari and former Imam of Al-Masjid an-Nabawi.
- Ali Abdullah Jaber – Former Imam of Masjid al-Haram in Makkah.
- Rabee al-Madkhali – Prominent Salafi scholar and former head of the Sunnah Department at the university.
- Muqbil bin Hadi al-Wadi'i – Founder of Dar al-Hadith al-Dammaj in Yemen.
- Ihsan Ilahi Zahir – Pakistani Islamic scholar, author, and graduate of the university.
- Ziya-ur-Rahman Azmi – Former Dean of the Department of Hadith at the university and author of comprehensive Hadith compilations.

== See also ==
- List of Islamic educational institutions
- List of universities in Saudi Arabia
