= Abdulmohsen Al-Qasim =

Saudi Islamic scholar and Imam (born 1967)

Virtuous Sheikh Dr. Abdulmohsen Al-Qasim
- عبد المحسن القاسم
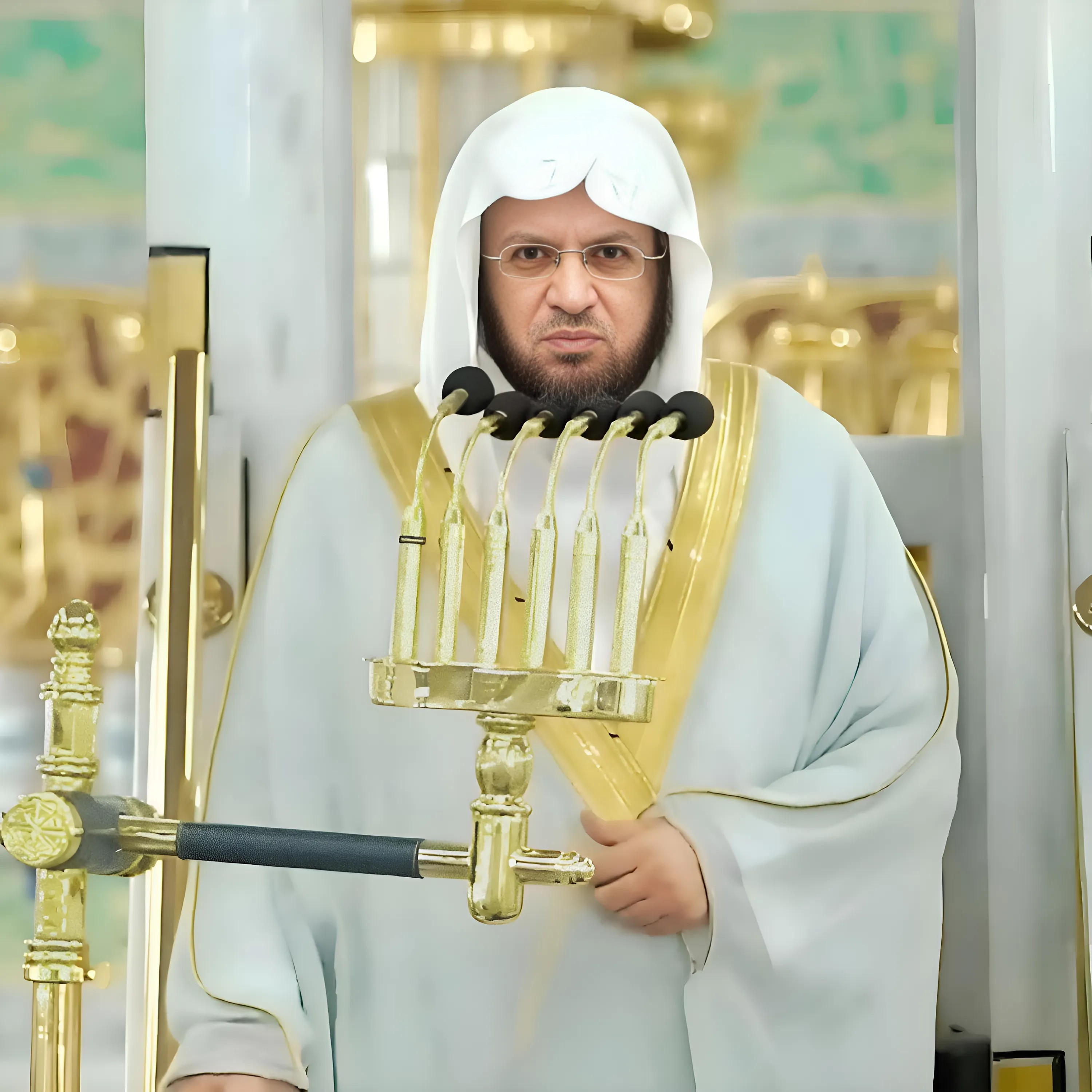

Imam and Khatib at Prophet's Mosque
- Incumbent
- Assumed office 1997 (1418AH)

Personal life
- Born: 1967 (age 58–59) Mecca, Saudi Arabia
- Home town: Al Bir
- Notable works: List: Arabic: متون طالب العلم, romanized: Mutūn Ṭālib Al’Ilm, lit. 'Texts for the student of knowledge'; Arabic: طريقة لترك التدخين (طُبع سابقاً باسم: اجعلها الأخيرة), lit. '(Way to Quit Smoking)'
- Education: Imam Mohammad Ibn Saud Islamic University (PhD)
- Website: https://a-alqasim.com/

Religious life
- Religion: Islam
- Profession: Imam, Khatib, Judge

Muslim leader
- Teacher: List: Abdul-Aziz Ibn Baz; al-Uthaymin; Saleh Al-Fawzan
- Arabic name
- Personal (Ism): ʿAbdulMuḥsin عَبْدُ المُحْسِنِ
- Patronymic (Nasab): Ibn Muḥammad Ibn ʿAbdirRaḥmān Ibn Muḥammad Ibn ʿAbdillāh Ibn Qāsim بْنُ مُحَمَّدِ بْنِ عَبْدِ الرَّحْمَنِ بْنِ مُحَمَّدِ بْنِ عَبْدِ اللَّهِ بْنِ قَاسِمٍ
- Teknonymic (Kunya): Abū Muḥammad أَبُو مُحَمَّدٍ
- Toponymic (Nisba): Al-Asimi Al-Qahtani العاصمي القحطاني

Abdulmohsen Al-Qasim (Arabic: عبد المحسن القاسم) is a Saudi Islamic scholar, imam, preacher, and author.

== Life ==
=== Birth ===
Abdulmohsen ibn Muhammad bin Abdul Rahman Al-Qasim was born in Mecca, in 1967, while his father was residing there to oversee the printing of Fatawa Shaykh al-Islam Ibn Taymiyyah.

=== Family ===
==== Father ====
Al-Qasim's Father Muhammad bin Abdur Rahman, was among the senior students of Shaykh Muhammad Ibn Ibrahim Al Ash-Shaykh – Mufti of Saudi Arabia during his era. His father worked as a teacher in the faculty of Uṣūl ad-Dīn in the department of Islamic Creed at Imam Mohammad Ibn Saud Islamic University. He also has compiled the religious verdicts (fatwa) and correspondence of his teacher Muḥammad Ibn Ibrahim Al Ash-Shaykh and has authored many other books.

==== Grandfather ====
Al-Qasim's grandfather, Abdul Rahman bin Muhammad bin Qasim, was an Islamic scholar and author of many written works.

=== Education ===
Al-Qasim received a B.A, then a master's degree in comparative Fiqh in 1989. He then concluded his academic course with a Doctorate in Fiqh from Imam Mohammad Ibn Saud Islamic University in 1992. His doctoral thesis, titled Arabic: المَسْبُوكُ عَلَى مِنْحَةِ السُّلُوكِ شَرْحُ تُحْفَةِ المُلُوكِ, romanized: (AlMasbūk A’lā Minḥat AlSulūk Sharh Tuḥfat AlMulūk), lit. '(The cast on the behavior gift explaining the masterpiece of Kings)', spanned six volumes but was later condensed into a four-volume publication after being printed.

=== Imamate ===
Al-Qasim was appointed as an imam and Khatib of Prophet's Mosque in 1997, corresponding to 1418AH.

== Literary works (external links) ==
1. →Arabic: متون طالب العلم, romanized: Mutūn Ṭālib Al’Ilm, lit. 'Texts for the student of knowledge'
2. →Arabic: طريقة لترك التدخين (طُبع سابقاً باسم: اجعلها الأخيرة), lit. '(Way to Quit Smoking (previously printed as: Make It Your Last)).'
3. →Arabic: المدينة المنورة: فضائلها، المسجد النبوي، الحجرة النبوي, lit. 'Medina "its virtues – the Prophet's Mosque – the Prophet's Chamber'
4. →Arabic: الأمر بالمعروف والنهي عن المنكر – أصل من أصول الدين, lit. 'Enjoining good and forbidding evil is one of the fundamentals of religion'
