= Al Bir =

Al Bir البير
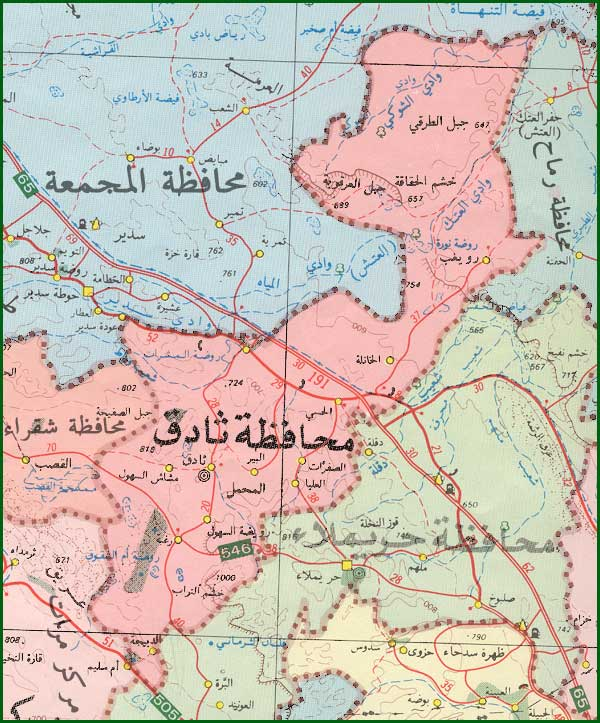
- Map illustrates Thadig region and shows Al bir location

- Location within Saudi Arabia
- Coordinates: 25°17′18″N 45°57′19″E
- Country: Saudi Arabia
- Emirate: Ar Riyad Province
- Area: Thadig
- Established: 1015 Hijri 1606 AD
- Elevation: 700 m (2,300 ft)
- Time zone: UTC+3 (AST)
- Area code: +9666
- Website: www.al-bir.com

Al Bir (ar:البير) is a village in Saudi Arabia, and a village of Al-Mehmal area (Thadig), which is one of the populous urban areas in Riyadh region. A Historical village, which is located in central region of Saudi Arabia 120 km (75 Miles) North of the capital city of Riyadh.

== History ==
Al Bir was founded in 1015 Hijri (around 1606 AD) when Al- Duwasir tribe (Al- Honaihen) moved to the area.

Al-Honaihen, namely; Mohammad and his brother Abdullah, took over Al Bir town from AlErinat, and they established their presence and their offspring.

== Climate and topography ==
Al bir is surrounded by mountains. Its geographical location gathers rain water from the regions around it.

== See also ==
- List of cities and towns in Saudi Arabia
- Regions of Saudi Arabia
