= Muhammad Ayyub =

Imam of Prophet's Mosque (1952–2016)

Shaykh Muhammad Ayyub
- محمد أيوب
- Born: October 1952; Mecca, Saudi Arabia
- Died: 16 April 2016 (aged 63–64); Medina, Saudi Arabia
- Resting place: Al-Baqi Cemetery, Medina
- Education: Islamic University of Madinah
- Occupations: Imam, Qari and Islamic scholar

Imam of Prophet's Mosque
- In office 1990–1997
- In office June – July 2015

Imam of Quba Mosque
- In office 1997–2016

Religious life
- Religion: Islam
- Denomination: Sunni

Muslim leader
- Teacher: Khalil Al-Qari
- Muhammad Ayyub Recitation Recitation of Ibrahim (surah) verse 35-41

Muhammad Ayyub ibn Muhammad Yusuf ibn Sulayman Umar al-Arakani (Note: Arabic: محمد أيوب بن محمد يوسف بن سليمان عمر الأراكاني; Arabic pronunciation:[muˈħam.mad ʔajˈjuːb bin muˈħam.mad ˈjuːsuf bin sulajˈmaːn ˈʕu.mar]) (October 1952 – 16 April 2016) (Note: Hijri era: 1372 – 9 Rajab 1437) was a Saudi Arabian Quran reciter, imam, and Islamic scholar. He was best known for his Quran recitation and service as an imam of Masjid an-Nabawi in Medina between 1990 and 1997, and again in 2015. He also served as an imam of Masjid Quba in Medina. He also worked as a faculty member of the Department of Tafsir in the Faculty of the Holy Qur'an and Islamic Studies at the Islamic University of Madinah and a member of the Scholarly Committee of the King Fahd Complex for the Printing of the Holy Quran. He died on 16 April 2016.

== Early life and family ==
Ayyub was born in October 1952 (1372 AH) to a Rohingya family in Mecca, Saudi Arabia. His grandfather, Sulayman Umar, had been a farmer in a village in Arakan, a coastal region along the Bay of Bengal which was incorporated into the Union of Burma in 1948. In the following year, Ayyub’s father, Muhammad Yusuf, was detained by Burmese authorities amid Rohingya persecution in the region. Yusuf subsequently fled to Saudi Arabia via Bangladesh. As the eldest child, Ayyub assumed responsibility for contributing to the family’s livelihood from an early age.

Ayyub followed the Hanafi school of Islamic jurisprudence.

== Education ==
Muhammad Ayyub completed the memorization of the Quran in 1965 (1385 AH) under the guidance of Khalil bin Abd al-Rahman al-Qari in Mecca. During this period he became acquainted with Ali Abdullah Jaber. After finishing his primary education in 1966 (1386 AH), he moved to Medina and continued his studies at an Islamic school, from which he graduated in 1972 (1392 AH).

He later enrolled in the Faculty of Sharia at the Islamic University of Madinah, and received a bachelor's degree in 1976 (1396 AH). He then specialized in Tafsir (Quranic exegesis) and `Ulum al-Qur'an (sciences of the Quran), earning a master's degree from the Faculty of the Holy Qur'an and Islamic Studies. His thesis was titled: “Sa'id ibn Jubayr and His Narrations in Tafsir from the Beginning of the Qur’an to the End of Surah At-Tawbah.” He completed his doctorate at the same faculty in either 1987 or 1988 (1408 AH). His doctoral dissertation was titled: “The Narrations of Sa‘id ibn Jubayr in Tafsir from the Beginning of Surah Yunus to the End of the Qur’an.”.

In addition to his studies in public schools and at the university, he studied under various ulama in Medina, learning various Islamic sciences from them, including tafsir, fiqh (Islamic jurisprudence), hadith and hadith terminology, and usul al-fiqh (the Principles of Islamic jurisprudence). Among his teachers were Basheer Ahmed As-Siddique, Abdul Aziz Muhammad Uthman, Grand Mufti Muhammad Sayyid Tantawi, Akram Dia'a Al-Umari, Muhammad al-Amin al-Shanqiti, Abdul Muhsin Al-Abbad, Abdullah Muhammad al-Ghunayman and Abu Bakr al-Jaza'iri.

== Career ==
In 1990 (1410 AH) he was appointed as an imam of Masjid an-Nabawi in Medina, a position he held until 1997 (1417 AH). He subsequently served as an Imam at Masjid Quba and other mosques in Medina. In 2015 (1436 AH), he was reappointed as an Imam of Masjid an-Nabawi to lead the Tarawih prayers during Ramadan.

In c. 2008, the Embassy of Bangladesh facilitated Ayyub's visit to and week-long stay in his ancestral village in Arakan.

== Death ==
Muhammad Ayyub died on 16 April 2016. His Funeral Prayer was held in Masjid an-Nabawi after Zuhr (noon) prayer, and he was buried in Al-Baqi Cemetery in Medina.
