= Abu 'Abs ibn Jabr =

Abu 'Abs ibn Jabr (Arabic: أبو عبس بن جبر) was a companion of the Islamic prophet Muhammad who participated in all military campaigns alongside the Prophet.

== Biography ==
Abu 'Abs ibn Jabr was the son of 'Amr bin Zaid bin Jusham bin Haritha, a member of the Banu Haritha tribe. His mother was Layla bint Rafi' bin 'Amr bin 'Adi bin Majda'ah bin Haritha.

He was born before Islam and was one of the few people who knew how to write Arabic.

After embracing Islam, he broke the idols of his tribe alongside Abu Burdah ibn Niyar. Muhammad established a bond of brotherhood between Abu 'Abs and Khunais bin Hudhafah al-Sahmi.

Abu 'Abs participated in the Battles of Badr, Uhud, al-Khandaq, and all other battles alongside Muhammad.

He was among those who participated in the assassination of Ka'b bin al-Ashraf.

During the caliphates of Umar and Uthman, he served as a "Mussaddiq" (Note: It refers to the person who collects alms from livestock.)

He had many descendants in Medina and Baghdad. Among them were Muhammad and Mahmud, whose mother was Umm 'Isa bint Maslamah bin Salamah bin Khalid bin 'Adi bin Majda'ah bin Haritha. She was the sister of Muhammad bin Maslamah and one of the women who pledged allegiance. Another of his sons was 'Ubayd Allah, whose mother was Umm Harith bint Muhammad bin Maslamah bin Salamah bin Khalid bin 'Adi bin Majda'ah bin Haritha. He also had sons named Zaid and Humayd, though their mother is not named in the records.

Abu 'Abs died at the age of 70 in the year 34 AH (654 CE).

His Janazah (funeral prayer) was led by Uthman, and he was buried in Al-Baqi', Medina. It is narrated that those who descended into his grave included Abu Burdah ibn Niyar, Qatadah bin al-Nu'man, Muhammad bin Maslamah, and Salamah bin Salamah bin Waqsh, all of whom were participants in the Battle of Badr.
