= Henry Samman =

English shipowner

Sir Henry Samman Bt
- Born: 14 July 1849
- Died: 7 March 1928 (aged 78); Cimiez, Nice, France
- Occupation: Shipowner

Sir Henry Samman, 1st Baronet (14 July 1849 – 7 March 1928) was an English shipowner.

Samman began his career as an apprentice on a tea clipper sailing between London and India. He rose to become owner of the Hull-based Henry Samman & Co and managing director of the Deddington Steamship Company. He was chairman of the shipping section of Hull Chamber of Commerce and represented it on the Executive Council of the Chamber of Shipping. He was also a member of the Executive of the Shipping Federation and an Elder Brother of Trinity House.

Samman was created a baronet in the 1921 New Year Honours. He died in Cimiez, Nice, France, at the age of 78 and was succeeded by his son, Harry.

The Sir Henry Samman Endowment Fund was set up in 1917 to encourage the study of business methods and languages. The Fund's trustees operate under the auspices of the Hull and Humber Chamber of Commerce.

== Footnotes ==
Baronetage of the United Kingdom
New creation	Baronet (of Routh); 1921–1928	Succeeded by Henry Samman
