= Mahmoud Khalil al-Qari =

Saudi imam (died 2022)

- Title: Imam of the Mosque of the Two Qiblas in Medina; Formerly appointed Imam of the Prophet’s Mosque

Personal life
- Born: Medina, Saudi Arabia
- Died: June 25, 2022 (aged 69) Medina, Saudi Arabia
- Buried: Al-Baqi Cemetery
- Parent: Khalil Al-Qari (father)
- Education: Bachelor’s degree in the College of the Holy Qur’an and Islamic Studies

Religious life
- Religion: Islam
- Denomination: Sunni
- Sect: Salafi

Mahmoud Khalil Abd al-Rahman al-Qari was the Imam of the mosque of the two Qiblas in Medina and the formerly appointed Imam of the Prophet’s Mosque. He is the son of Khalil Al-Qari.

Mahmoud Khalil Al-Qari was born and raised in Medina in a Saudi-Pakistani family. He memorized the Qur’an from his father Khalil Al-Qari, when he was ten years old. He also obtained a bachelor’s degree in the College of the Holy Qur’an and Islamic Studies.

The approval was issued to assign him as Imam in the Prophet’s Mosque in Tarawih prayers during the month of Ramadan in the year 1438 and 1439 AH (2017 and 2018). He continued to lead the worshipers at the Al-Qiblatain Mosque until his death.

He and his father are regarded as two of the key pioneers of the modern day Qirat mostly heard in Saudi Arabia.

== Death ==
He died on the morning of Saturday 26 Dhu al-Qa’dah 1443 AH corresponding to 25 June 2022 in Medina, in intensive care unit in a hospital after illness. His funeral prayer was offered on the same day after the Maghrib prayer in the Prophet’s Mosque and burial in Al-Baqi Cemetery.
