= Muhammad as-Samman al-Madani =

Sunni scholar, descendant of Muhammad (1718–1775)

Muhammad bin Abdul Karim as-Samman al-Madani

Personal life
- Born: 1718 Medina
- Died: 1776 (aged 57–58) Medina
- Known for: Founding the Sammaniyah Sufi Order

Religious life
- Religion: Islam
- Denomination: Sunni
- Jurisprudence: Shafi'i
- Creed: Ash'ari

Shaykh Muhammad bin Abdul Karim as-Samman al-Madani (born in Medina in 1718 AD-1775 AD) was a scholar descended from the Islamic prophet Muhammad. He was a Sunni with Ash'ari understanding in the field of Aqeedah (creed), and a Shafi'i principle in the field of fiqh, and adheres to Junayd al-Baghdadi in the field of Sufism.

He was a Faqih, hadith expert, and historian of his time, and was the caretaker of the city of Medina and guardian of the tomb of Muhammad. He initially studied at the Khalwatiyya Sufi order in Damascus, but he devised a new way of approaching Allah which was eventually referred to as the Sammaniyya Tariqa. This order became prominent in Indonesia, especially in Palembang, due to his returning students and the later financing by the Sultan of Palembang of a Sammaniyya lodge in Jeddah.

== Birth and genealogy ==
Sheikh Samman was born in Medina in 1718 AD and was a descendant of Muhammad from the line of Hasan bin Ali, son of Fatimah az-Zahra bint Muhammad His family came from the tribe of Quraish.

== Life ==
Sheikh Samman initially studied in the Khalwatiyyah Order in Damascus. His teacher was Sheikh Mustafa Bakri, a great saint from Syria. Eventually, he began to open studies that contain dhikr techniques, Wazifa, and other teachings of Sufism. He devised a way of approaching Allah which was eventually referred to as the Sammaniyah Order. In order to acquire knowledge, he spent his life on various journeys. Some of the places he once visited to study include Iran, Syria, Hijaz, and Transoxania.

The reach of the Sammaniyya order reached Indonesia through some of his students, and its validity is recognized under the auspices of the Nahdlatul Ulama.

== Works ==
His most famous work is the book Al-Insab. He also authored other books, such as Mu'jamul Mashayekh, Tazyilul Tarikh Baghdad, and Tarikh Marv.

== Death ==
Sheikh Samman died in Medina on Wednesday, 24 January 1776 and was buried in Al-Baqi'.
