= Tarawih =

Sunni Islamic prayers specific to Ramadan

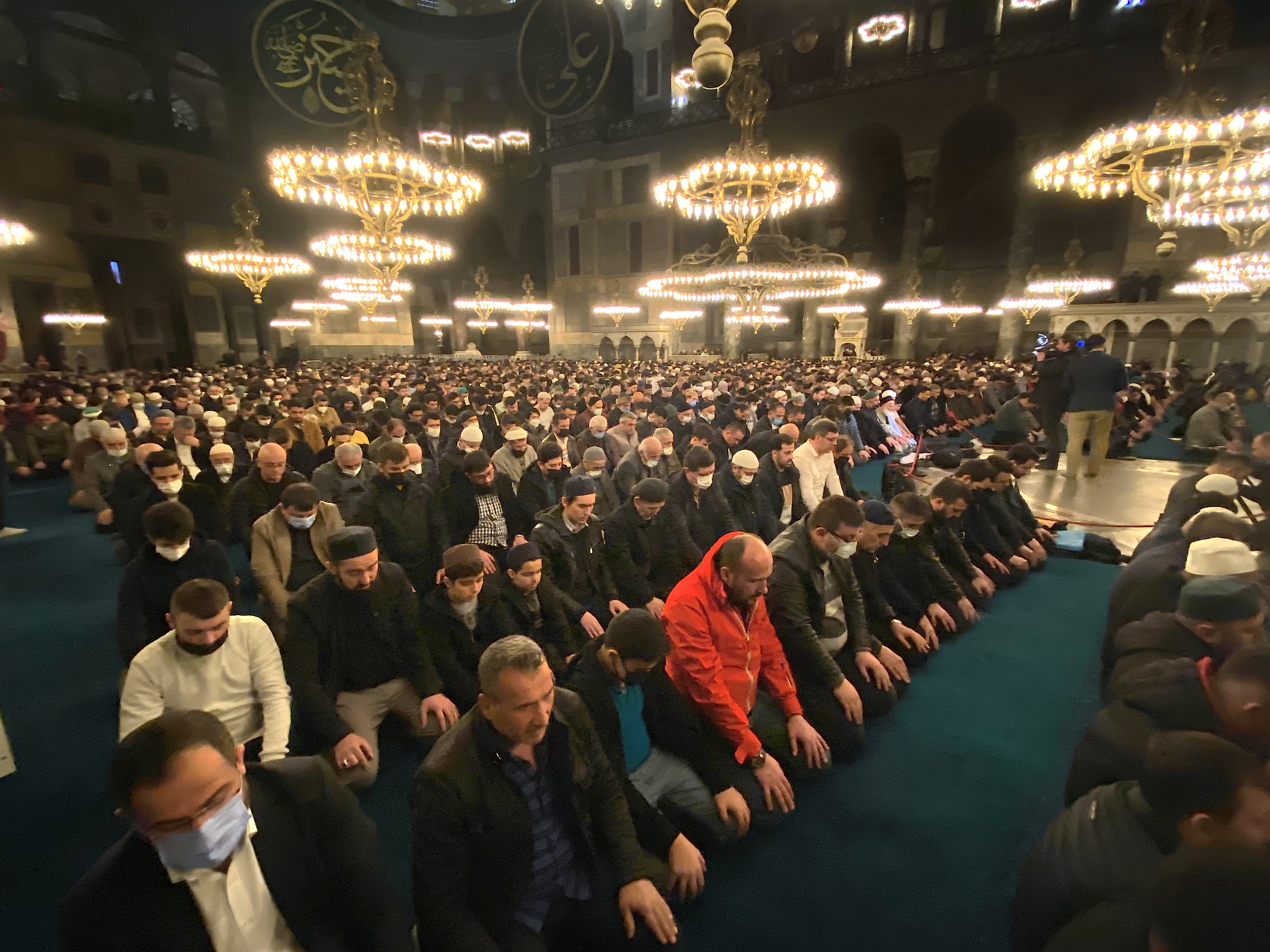
First Tarawih at the Hagia Sophia Grand Mosque, Istanbul, Turkey

Tarawih at the Al-Azhar Mosque, Cairo, Egypt

Tarawih (Arabic: التَّرَاوِيح, romanized: At-tarāwīḥ), also spelled Taraweeh, refers to special Sunnah prayers performed exclusively by Sunni Muslims during the Islamic month of Ramadan. The prayers involve the recitation of long portions of the Quran, consist of any number of even rak'a (cycles of prostration in an Islamic prayer), however most of the time either 8 or 20, and are often finished with the Witr prayer.

A key feature of Tarawih is the completion of the Quran during the month. The practice remains a significant aspect of Ramadan worship for many Sunni Muslims.

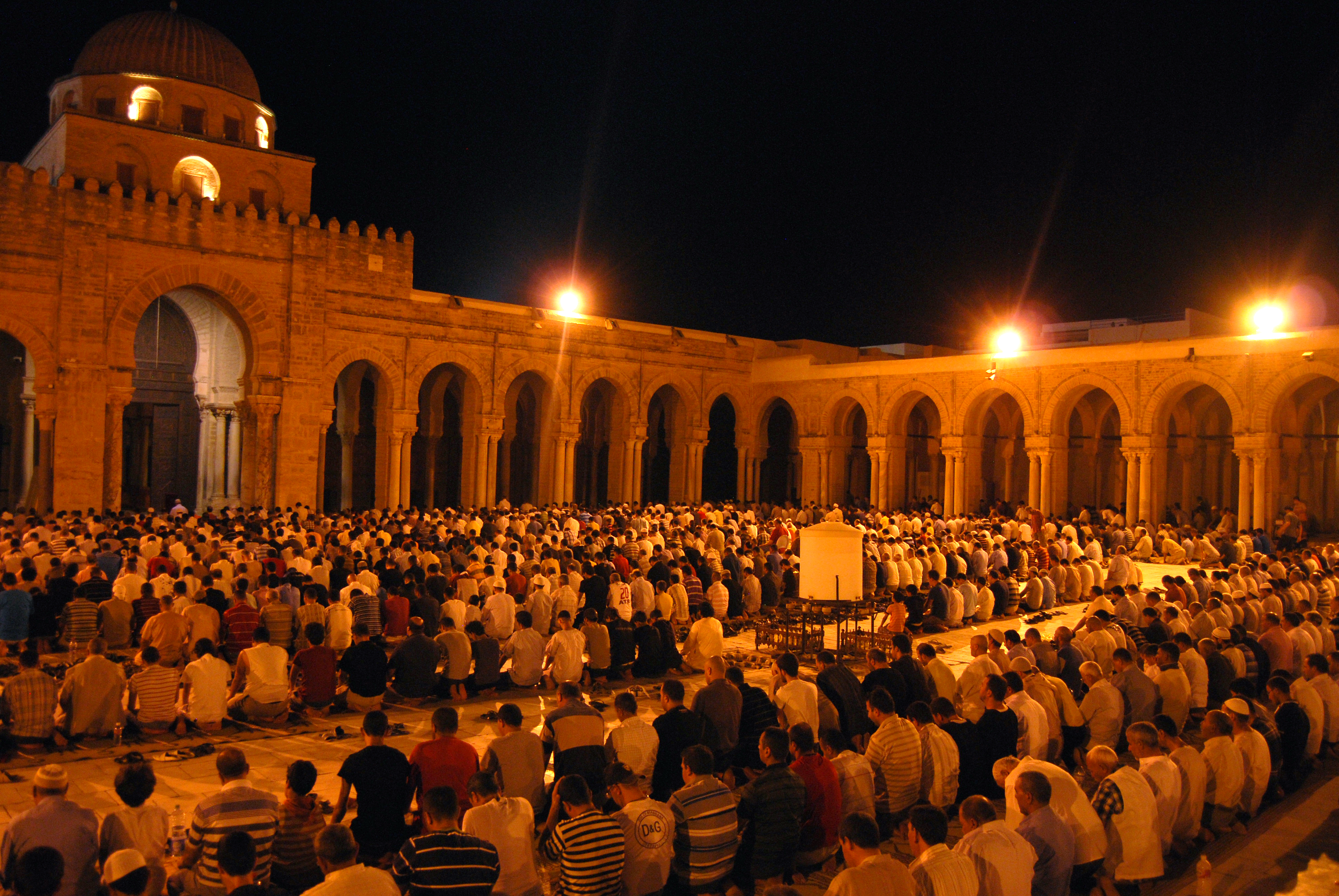
Tarawih prayer at the Great Mosque of Kairouan, Tunisia

== Overview ==
Tarawih prayers begin from the first Moon-sighted evening—the start of Ramadan—to second moon-sighted evening—the last day of Ramadan. This prayer is performed in congregation during Ramadan of the Islamic calendar, after Isha, and before witr, which is also prayed following the imam, who leads the prayer aloud in one or three raka'āts unlike for the eleven other months.

Tarawih prayers are prayed in pairs. According to the Hanafi, Maliki, Shafi'i, and Hanbali schools of Sunni Islam, the standard number of raka'āt is twenty since it is referred to in a narration in al-Muwatta, which states: "In the time of Umar, the people used to offer 20 raka'āt." However, it clearly mentions in the before the said narration that when Umar assigned Ubayy ibn Ka'b and Tamim al-Dari the duty lead the Tarawih, he ordered them to offer 11 raka'āt (eight of Tarawih and three of witr). Sunni Muslims believe it is customary to attempt a takmil ("complete recitation") of the Quran as one of the religious observances of Ramadan, by reciting at least one juz' per night in tarawih.

Tarawih prayers are considered Sunnah, or meritorious but not obligatory. However, it is believed that the reward for them is great, as it is the Sunnah of Muhammad and is reported in multiple authentic hadiths.

Muhammad—according to Abu Hurayra—said: "Whoever stands with the imam (in Taraweeh prayer) until he finishes, it is equivalent to spending the whole night in prayer." The hadith was used as a proof by Imam Ahmad ibn Hanbal.

In Malaysia, congregants may have a traditional light supper of snacks and drinks after completing these prayers called a moreh.

== Background ==
Tarawih is a prayer that is mentioned in Sunni traditions as Qiyam al-Layl min Ramadan ("Standing of night in Ramadan") and Qiyam al-Ramadan ("Standing of Ramadan"). Some Sunni Muslims regard Tarawih as confirmed traditional prayers (sunnat al-mu'akkadah). Other Sunni Muslims believe Tarawih is an optional prayer (nafl) that may be performed at home. According to that tradition, Muhammad initially and briefly prayed the Tarawih in congregations during Ramadan but discontinued the practice out of concern it would be mandated (fard) though he never forbade it. When Umar was caliph, he reinstated the praying of Tarawih in congregation.

Shia Muslims regard congregational Tarawih as a bid'ah ("innovation") that was reintroduced by Umar, according to his own words, after the death of Muhammad. In Tahdhib al-Ahkam, al-Tusi explains that the objection concerns the congregational performance of voluntary Ramadan prayers, while the prayers themselves are not condemned.

Muhammad al-Bukhari narrated regarding the Tarawih prayer in Sahih al-Bukhari:

I went out in the company of 'Umar bin Al-Khattab one night in Ramadan to the mosque and found the people praying in different groups. A man praying alone or a man praying with a little group behind him. So, 'Umar said, “In my opinion I would better collect these [people] under the leadership of one Qari (Reciter) (i.e. let them pray in congregation!).” So, he made up his mind to congregate them behind Ubai bin Ka'b. Then on another night I went again in his company and [saw that] the people were praying behind their reciter. On that, 'Umar remarked, “What an excellent bid'ah (i.e. innovation in religion) this is!”

Instead, Twelvers believe in the Tahajjud prayer, or salat al-layl ("night prayer"), which is recommended throughout the year, especially during the nights of Ramadan.

== Other ==
On 3 January 2000, Malaysian Prime Minister Mahathir Mohamad expressed regret that Tarawih prayers were used by certain people for political gain.

On 2 April 2022, hundreds of Muslims gathered in Times Square, New York City, to perform the first Tarawih prayers of Ramadan. Before the prayers, over 1,500 meals were handed out to the people to break their fast, known as iftar. The event marked the first public Tarawih prayers to be held in Times Square.

== See also ==
- Glossary of Islam
- Outline of Islam
- Index of Islam-related articles
- Shia–Sunni relations
  - Shia–Sunni relations#Differences in beliefs and practices
  - Shia–Sunni relations#Salat
- Tahajjud
