= Harb (tribe) =

Arab tribe in the Arabian Peninsula

Harb قبيله حرب
- Arab tribe
- Ethnicity: Arab
- Nisba: Al-Harbi الحربي
- Location: Saudi Arabia; Kuwait; Qatar; United Arab Emirates; Yemen; Iraq; Lebanon; Syria; Jordan; Palestine; Morocco; Tunisia; Libya; Turkey
- Language: Arabic
- Religion: Sunni Islam; Shia Islam

Harb (Arabic: حرب) is an Arab tribe in the Arabian Peninsula. It is originally a Qahtanite tribe. Some sources on Arab tribes' genealogy state that the great-grandfather of the Harb tribe is Harb ibn Saad ibn Saad ibn Khawlan ibn Amr ibn Qadha'ah ibn Himyar ibn Qahtan. Harb tribal lands extend from the Red Sea coast in Tihamah (western part of Saudi Arabia) to the heart of Najd in the central region of Saudi Arabia, and from North the Harbi lands extend from Medina (a holy city for Muslims) to Al Qunfudhah in the south. The tribe's reach extends to other Arab countries like Kuwait, Iraq, Bahrain and the United Arab Emirates.

The Harb tribe dates to the 2nd century of the Islamic calendar. When Qahtani tribes emigrated from the south of Arabian Peninsula to Hejaz around 131 AH for water and land space after some battles with their cousins Banu Ar-Rabi'ah bin Saad, this caused several tribal conflicts with the native and mostly Adnani Arab tribes of Hejaz and Tihamah such as Juhaynah, Anazzah, Muzaynah, and Sulaym over land and water. After around three centuries in Hejaz, the Harb tribe became a dominant tribe in the heart of Hejaz with territories surrounding the holy city of Medina. Harb in the 21st century, like many other Arabian tribes, is a federation of tribes and families.

Many tribal members have migrated in recent decades to the three major metropolitan centers of Saudi Arabia: Riyadh, Jeddah, Al-Qassim and Dammam.

== Tribe Sections ==
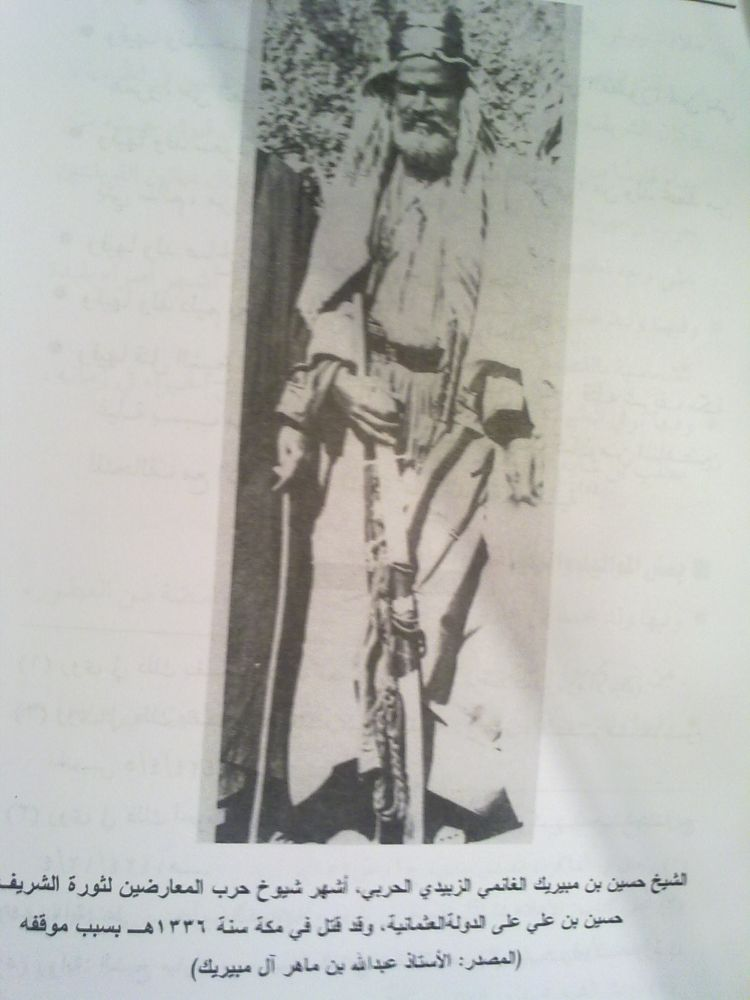
Hussein Al-Ghanmi chief Harb tribe In Hejaz and Prince of Rabigh.

=== Masrooh ===
- Banu Amro (Al-Amri).
- Banu safar (Al-Safri).
  - Alfaraduh (Al-Fraidi).
  - Alwahub (Al-Wahbi).
  - Alfhaudah (Al-Fhaidi).
  - Alhsnan (Al-Haysoni).
- Banu Ali (Al-Alawi).
- Banu Awf (AlOufi, Al-lhilibi).
  - Alsawaid (Al-Saadi)
- Zubaid (Al-Zubaidi).
- Mukhallaf (Al-Mukhallafi).

=== Banu Salim ===
==== Maymoon ====
- Al-Ahamidah (Al-Ahmadi).
- Arhelah (Al-Rehaili).
- Wild Muhammad (Al-Muhammadi).
- Subh "As-Subiih" (As-Subhi).
- As-Surahah (As-Suraihi).
- Al-Matalihah (Al-Matlahi).
  - Banu Amri (Al-Amri As-Salimi).
  - Al-Mahamid (Al-Mihmadi).
  - Al-Maghamsah (Al-Maghamsi).
- Al-Gaydi (Al-Ga'ydi).
- Al-Hayadirah (Al-Haidari).
- Banu Yahya (Al-Yahyawi).
- Al-Mawari'ah (Al-Muwarra'i).
- Ar-Roothan (Ar-Ruwaithi).

==== Al-Marawihah ====
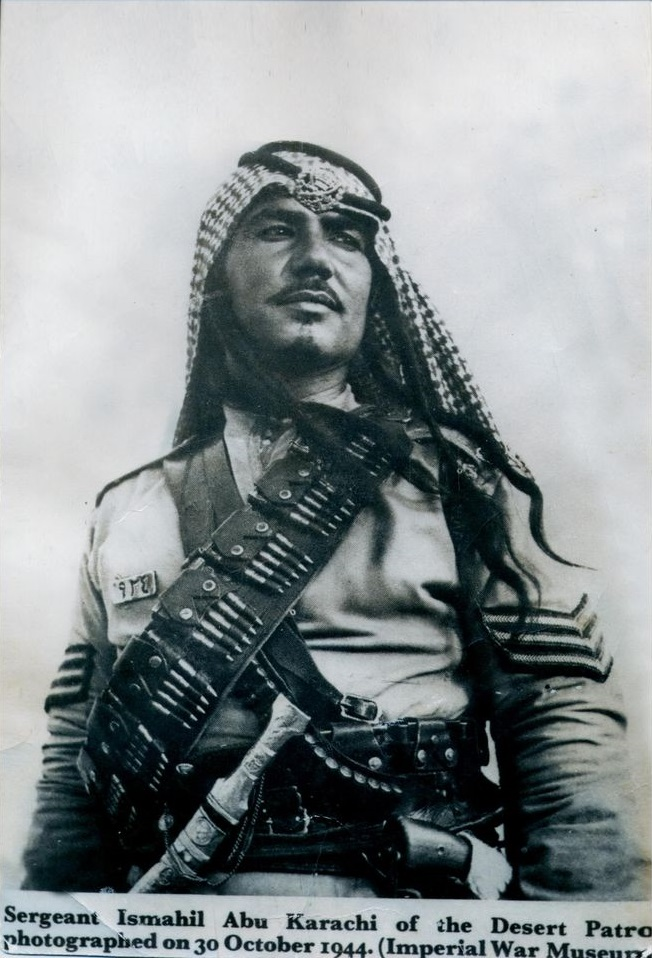
Mahamid sergeant archived at the Imperial War Museum

The Harb tribe had two main sections, Banu Salim and Masrooh:

- Muzaynah (Al-Muzaini).
  - Al-Nahaitah (Al-Naheet).
  - Al-bisharyah (Al-Bishri).
  - Al-Hawamilah (Al-Hawimili).
  - Al-Areemat (Al-Oraimah).
  - Al-Hisnan (Al-Hissni).
  - Al-Oanah (Al-Onni).
  - Al-Qussiyreen (Al-Qussiyri).
  - Al-Sarabitah (Al-Surbati).
  - Al-Habariyah (Al-Hubairi).
  - Al-Maraween (Al-Marwani).
  - Al-Hantam (Al-Hantami).
  - Al-Quba'ah (Al-Quba'i).
  - Al-Dubabeeq (Al-Dabbaqi).
  - Al-subahah (Al-sabeehi).
- Al-Huraibiyah (Al-Huraibi).
- Al-Dhawahrah (Al-Dhahiri).
- Al-Balajiyah (Al-Ballaji).
- Al-Hujalah (Al-Hujaili).
- Al-Hawazim (Al-Hazmi).
- Al-Hunaitat (Al-Hunaiti).
- Al-Hananyah (Al-Hunaini).
- Al -Raddadah (Al-Raddadi).

== Harb tribe outside the Arabian Peninsula ==
Several branches of the Harb tribe are spread outside their homeland by origin, most notably residing in the Bekaa Valley, Baalbek, and Zahle regions of Lebanon, which is home to the largest population of the tribe. Originating from the Hejaz region in the Arabian Peninsula, the tribe migrated to Lebanon during the 7th century. Over time, the Harb tribe became one of the most prominent and populous Arab tribes in Lebanon, particularly in the eastern and central regions.

The Harb tribe is part of the larger Qahtani branch of Arab tribes and is primarily Sunni Muslim, though it has some members belonging to other sects due to intermarriage. The tribe has historically been involved in agriculture, particularly in the fertile Bekaa Valley, where they established farming communities.

Throughout Lebanese history, the Harb tribe played a significant role in local politics, military affairs, and regional defense. During the Lebanese Civil War (1975–1990), members of the tribe were involved in various militias and provided support to different factions. The tribe has produced many notable figures in Lebanese politics, business, and culture, with several influential individuals holding leadership positions in municipal and regional governance.

Today, the Harb tribe remains influential in Lebanon, particularly in the Zahle and Baalbek areas. While many members of the tribe have moved to urban areas, the tribe maintains a strong sense of community and continues to play an active role in Lebanese politics and business. The tribe is known for its strong kinship ties and social cohesion, which have contributed to its longevity and influence in Lebanon.

Jordan:Mahamid from the Muttalhah from Maymun from Banu Salem from Harb, as this tribe is widely spread in the Levant and some regions of Iraq and the Maghreb countries, as it formed an emirate in Jordan, specifically the Karak governorate, which was known as the Emirate of Mahamid. And it ruled for a period of time prior to the alliance of tribes in Jordan over them and deterred their emirate, and there is a mountain in Jordan in the Ajloun governorate called Jabal Awf in reference to the Auf from Harb tribe.

And there is in Palestine in Beersheba a branch of the Harb tribe allied with the Azazma tribe.

They refer to themselves as the Mohammedans in relation to their grandfather Hamad bin Suleiman (in another narration Muhammad), and not to the Mahamid for lack of confusion due to the presence of their cousins from Mahamid Bani Salem who were in Jordan, specifically in its south at the time.

The Mahamid who are in Sudan and the countries of the Maghreb, who traveled with their alliance from the Bani Salim tribe, who neighboring and allied with it during their migration and travel to the north, and it is one of the largest tribes present there.

A Branche of Harb tribe is living in south east Anatolia, in Mardin region. The villages around Savur and Kiziltepe are areas of Harb where they are speaking Arab language. This Branche of Harb belongs to Salim and has moved from northern Syria and Arada into the region of Mesopotamia. It is not clear whether they moved in the time of the Islamic expansion or later during the Ottoman Empire.

== Traditions and Folklore ==
Harbis practice several folkloric dances in their festivals, harvest celebrations (in the past especially the Date Harvest), and in Eids (Muslim Festivals). These folkloric dances include Khubaiti (Arabic: الخبيتي), Bidwani (Arabic: البدواني), ḥirabi (Arabic: حرابي), Zaid (Arabic: زيد), Al-ʾarḍhah Al-ḥarbiyah (Arabic: العرضة الحربية), and Zeer (Arabic: الزير).

== Notable people ==
Among the tribe's members are:

- Abdel Mohsin Musellem, Saudi poet and writer.
- Dalal bint Mukhled Al-Harbi, Saudi historian.
- Saleh Al-Maghamsi, Saudi Sunni religious scholar and former imam of the Quba Mosque.
- Hamad Al-Jassir, prominent Saudi journalist and historian.
- Abdul Aziz al-Harbi, Saudi Islamic scholar and associate professor at Umm al-Qura University.

== See also ==
- Bedouin
