= Dalal (given name) =

Surname of Mercantile class including Jat rulers

Dalal (Arabic: دلال, Dalāl) is a given name. Notable people with the name include:

- Dalal Abdel Aziz (1960–2021), Egyptian actress
- Dalal Achcar (born 1937), Brazilian choreographer
- Dalal Abu Amneh (born 1983), Palestinian musical artist
- Dalal Al-Bizri, Lebanese researcher
- Dalal Bruchmann (born 1988), Austrian musician and actress
- Dalal bint Mukhled Al-Harbi, historian and member of the Saudi Shura Council
- Dalal Mesfer Al-Harith (born 1999), Qatari sprinter
- Dalal Khalifa, Qatari novelist and playwright
- Dalal Khario (born circa 1997), Yazidi refugee and author
- Dalal Midhat-Talakić (born 1981), Bosnian singer
- Dalal Mughrabi (1959–1978), Palestinian terrorist
- Dalal Salameh (born 1965), Palestinian activist and politician
- Dalal bint Saud Al Saud (1957–2021), Saudi royal
