= Holiest sites in Sunni Islam =

Both Sunni Muslims and Shia Muslims agree on the three holiest sites in Islam being, respectively, the Masjid al-Haram (including the Kaaba), in Mecca; the Prophet's Mosque (Al-Masjid Al-Nabawi), in Medina; and Al-Masjid al-Aqsa, in Jerusalem.

This Hadith emphasizes the religious significance and distinguished position of Islam’s three sacred mosques:

Narrated by Abu Hurayra: The Prophet (ﷺ) said: "Do not undertake a journey to visit any Mosque, but three: this Mosque of mine (Prophet's Mosque in Medina), the Mosque of al-Haram and the Mosque of Al-Aqsa"

Sahih al-Bukhari quotes Abu Darda as saying: "the Prophet of God, Muhammad said a prayer in the Sacred Mosque (in Mecca) is worth 100,000 prayers; a prayer in my mosque (in Medina) is worth 10,000 prayers; and a prayer in al-Aqsa Mosque is worth 1,000 prayers", more than in any other mosque.

Quba Mosque is also considered significant according to the Hadith. According to some, both the Umayyad Mosque in Damascus and the Ibrahimi Mosque in Hebron have been considered the fourth-holiest site in Islam.

== Al-Masjid Al-Haram ==
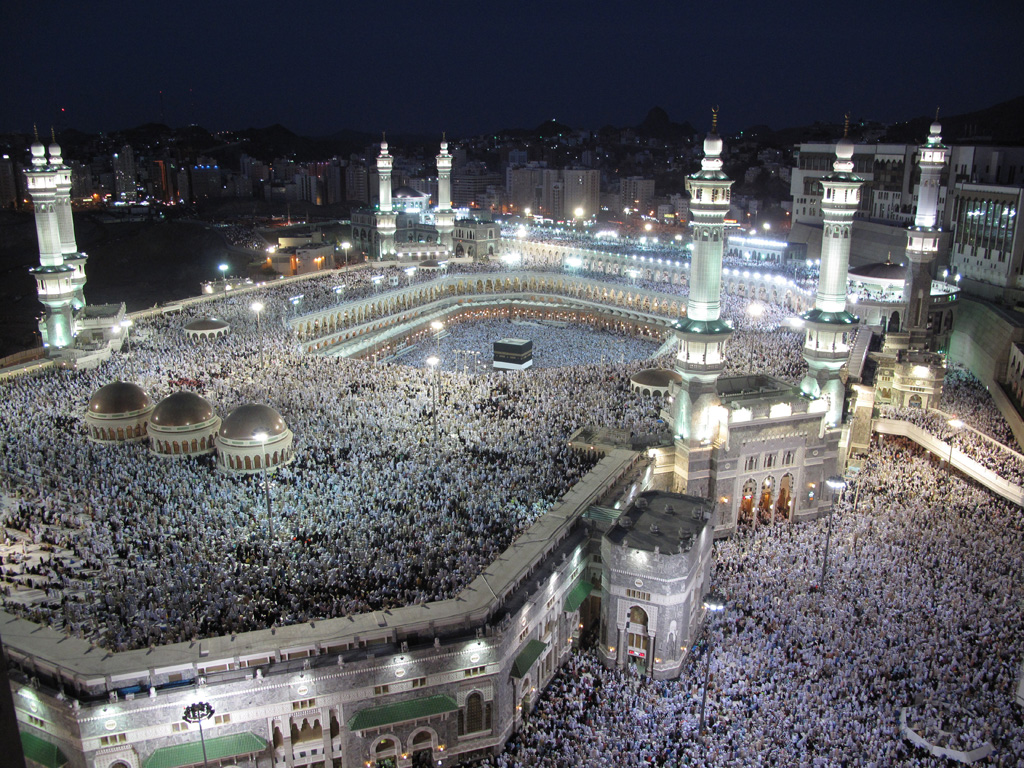
Al-Masjid Al-Haram (the Grand mosque)

Masjid al-Haram is the most sacred site in Islam, where the Kaaba is located. During the Hajj period, the mosque is unable to contain the multitude of pilgrims, who pray on the outlining streets. More than 2 million worshippers gather to pray during Eid prayers.

According to the teachings of Islam, Allah, used the word mosque when referring to the sites established by ʾIbrāhīm (Abraham) and his progeny as houses of worship to God centuries before the revelation of the Quran. Before Mecca and Jerusalem came under Muslim control between 630 CE and 638 CE, the site of the Kaaba, which (according to Muslim belief) was established by Ibrahim and Ismail.

And ˹remember˺ when Abraham raised the foundation of the House with Ishmael, ˹both praying,˺ “Our Lord! Accept ˹this˺ from us. You are indeed the All-Hearing, All-Knowing.

— Surah Al-Baqara 2:127

And ˹remember˺ when We assigned to Abraham the site of the House, ˹saying,˺ “Do not associate anything with Me ˹in worship˺ and purify My House for those who circle ˹the Ka’bah˺, stand ˹in prayer˺, and bow and prostrate themselves.

— Surah Al-Hajj 22:26

== Prophet's Mosque (Al-Masjid Al-Nabawi) ==
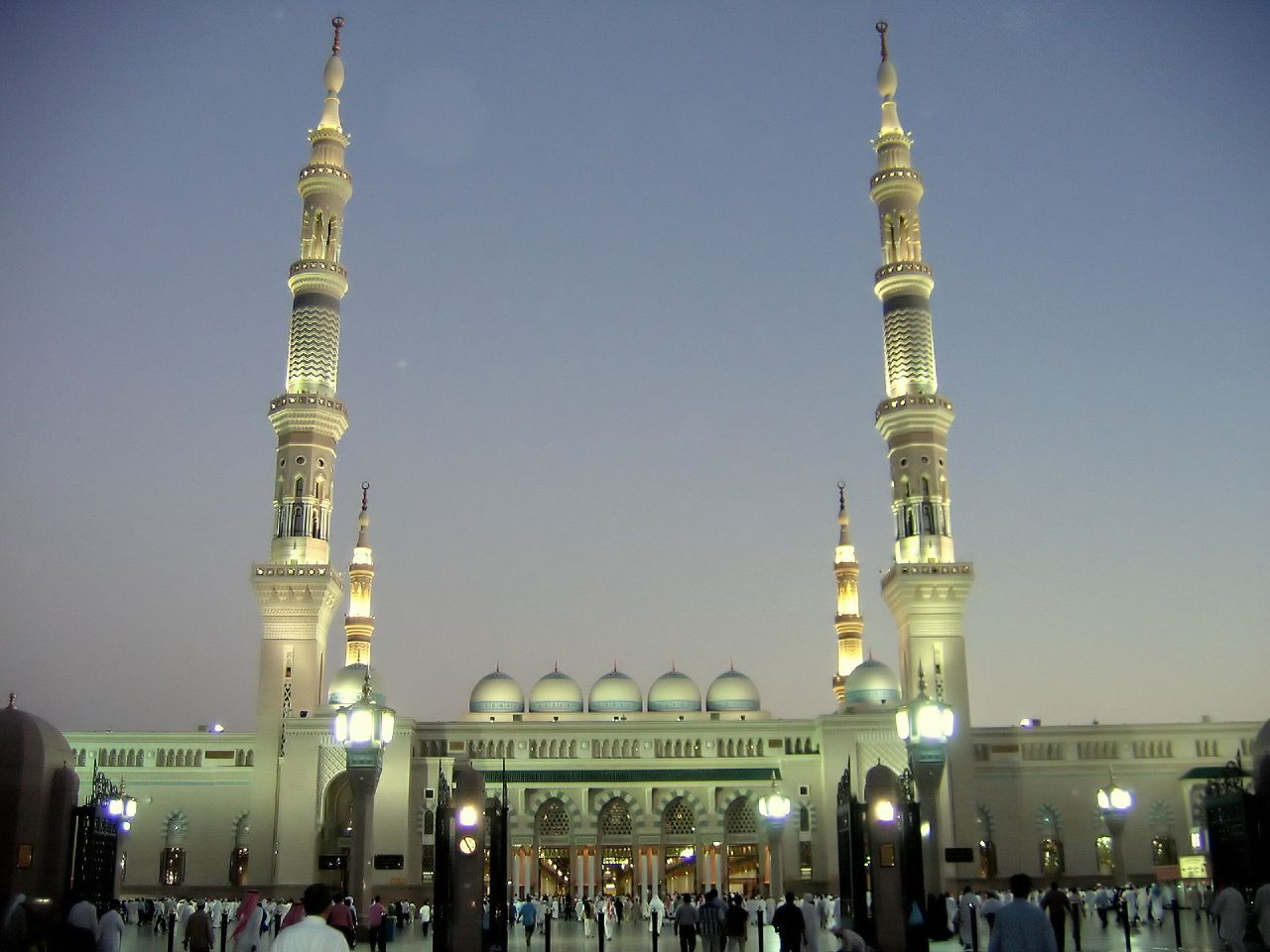
Prophet's Mosque (Al-Masjid al-Nabawi) in Medina, Saudi Arabia.

Prophet's Mosque (Al-Masjid al-Nabawi) (Arabic: المسجد النبوي, pronounced [ælˈmæsdʒidæˈnːæbæwiː]) or the Mosque of the Prophet, located in Medina, is the second holiest site in Islam.

The Mosque was originally the house of Muhammad; he settled there after his migration to Medina, and later built a mosque on the grounds. He himself shared in the heavy work of construction. The original mosque was an open-air building. The mosque also served as a community center, a court, and a religious school. There was a raised platform for the people who taught the Quran. The basic plan of the building has been adopted in the building of other mosques throughout the world.

Subsequent Islamic rulers greatly expanded and decorated the mosque. The most important feature of the site is the green dome over the center of the mosque, where the tomb of Muhammad is located. Constructed in 1817 CE and painted green in 1839 CE, it is known as the Dome of the Prophet. Early Muslim leaders Abu Bakr and Umar are buried beside Muhammad.

Medina is also home to the historically significant Quba Mosque and Masjid al-Qiblatayn.

== Al-Aqsa Mosque ==
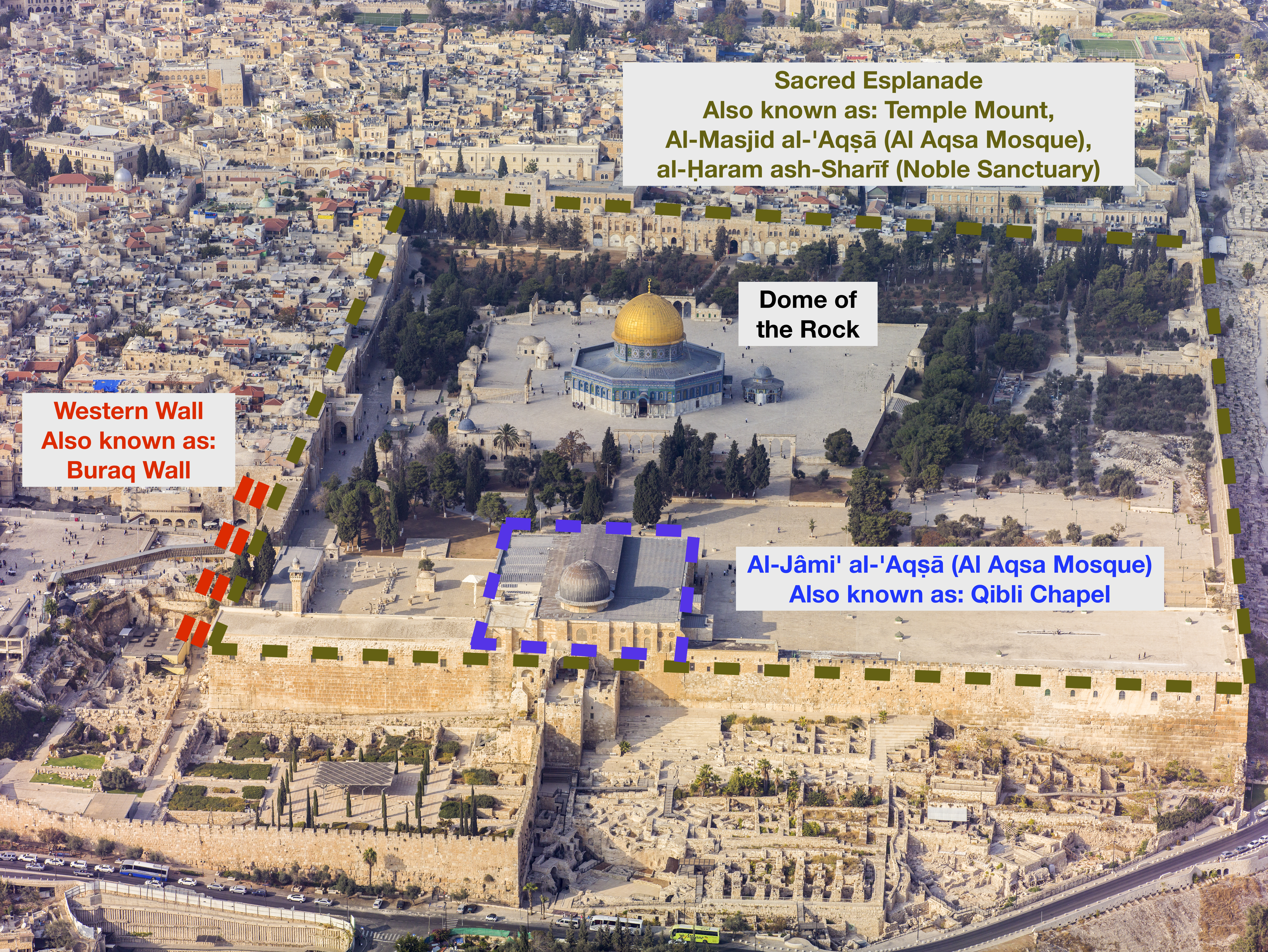
Al-Aqsa Mosque, Jerusalem, also known as the Haram al-Sharif which includes the Al-Aqsa (Qibli) Mosque and Dome of the Rock

Masjid Al-Aqsa ("the Farthest Mosque"), also known as the "Al Aqsa compound", is a holy site in Shia and Sunni Islam and is located in the Old City of Jerusalem, and is widely regarded by Jews as the Temple Mount, the site of the Holy Temple. It includes the Qibli mosque and the Dome of the Rock. It is the third holiest site in Islam. The term Al-Aqsa Mosque was coined in the Quran:

Glory be to the One Who took His servant ˹Muḥammad˺ by night from the Sacred Mosque to the Farthest Mosque whose surroundings We have blessed, so that We may show him some of Our signs. Indeed, He alone is the All-Hearing, All-Seeing.

— Surah Al-Isra 17:1

Al-Aqsa Mosque is sacred because the "first of the two qiblas" (Arabic: اولى القبلتين) was Jerusalem. In Islamic tradition, Al-Aqsa is said to be the "second mosque" (Arabic: ثاني المسجدين), as well as the "third of the holy sanctuaries" (Arabic: ثالث الحرمين), under Islamic Law.

The term used for mosque, masjid, literally means "place of prostration", and includes monotheistic or more specifically Abrahamic places of worship but does not exclusively lend itself to physical structures but a location, as Muhammad stated "The earth has been made for me (and for my followers) a place for praying...". When Caliph Umar conquered Jerusalem after Muhammad's passing, a prayer house was built on the site. The structure was expanded by the Umayyad caliph Abd al-Malik ibn Marwan and finished by his son al-Walid in 705 CE. The building was repeatedly destroyed by earthquakes and rebuilt, until the reconstruction in 1033 by the Fatimid caliph Ali az-Zahir, and that version of the structure is what can be seen in the present day. This same area was called at later Islamic periods as the Haram al-Sharif or the "Noble Sanctuary". The Dome of the Rock is almost unanimously accepted to be the area from where Muhammad is said to have ascended to heaven, although a few fringe theories claim it had been from a mosque in Medina, Jir'ana or Kufa.

Although most political references to the Al-Aqsa Mosque date from the 12th century or later due to its occupation by the Crusades, others claim that the mosque's position in Islam is firmly grounded in a number of hadith dating from the birth of Islam.

While Jerusalem is not mentioned by name in the Quran, it is recognized as a sacred site based on several references that have been linked to Jerusalem by later Islamic traditions such as the hadith. Some academics attribute the holiness of Jerusalem to the rise and expansion of a certain type of literary genre, known as al-Fadhail or history of cities. The Fadhail of Jerusalem inspired Muslims, especially during the Umayyad period, to embellish the sanctity of the city beyond its status in the holy texts. Others point to the political motives of the Umayyad dynasty which led to the sanctification of Jerusalem in Islam. Later medieval scripts, as well as modern-day political tracts, tend to classify al-Aqsa Mosque as the third holiest site in Islam. In addition, the Organisation of Islamic Cooperation, refers to the al-Aqsa Mosque as the third holiest site in Islam (and calls for Arab sovereignty over it).

== Quba Mosque ==
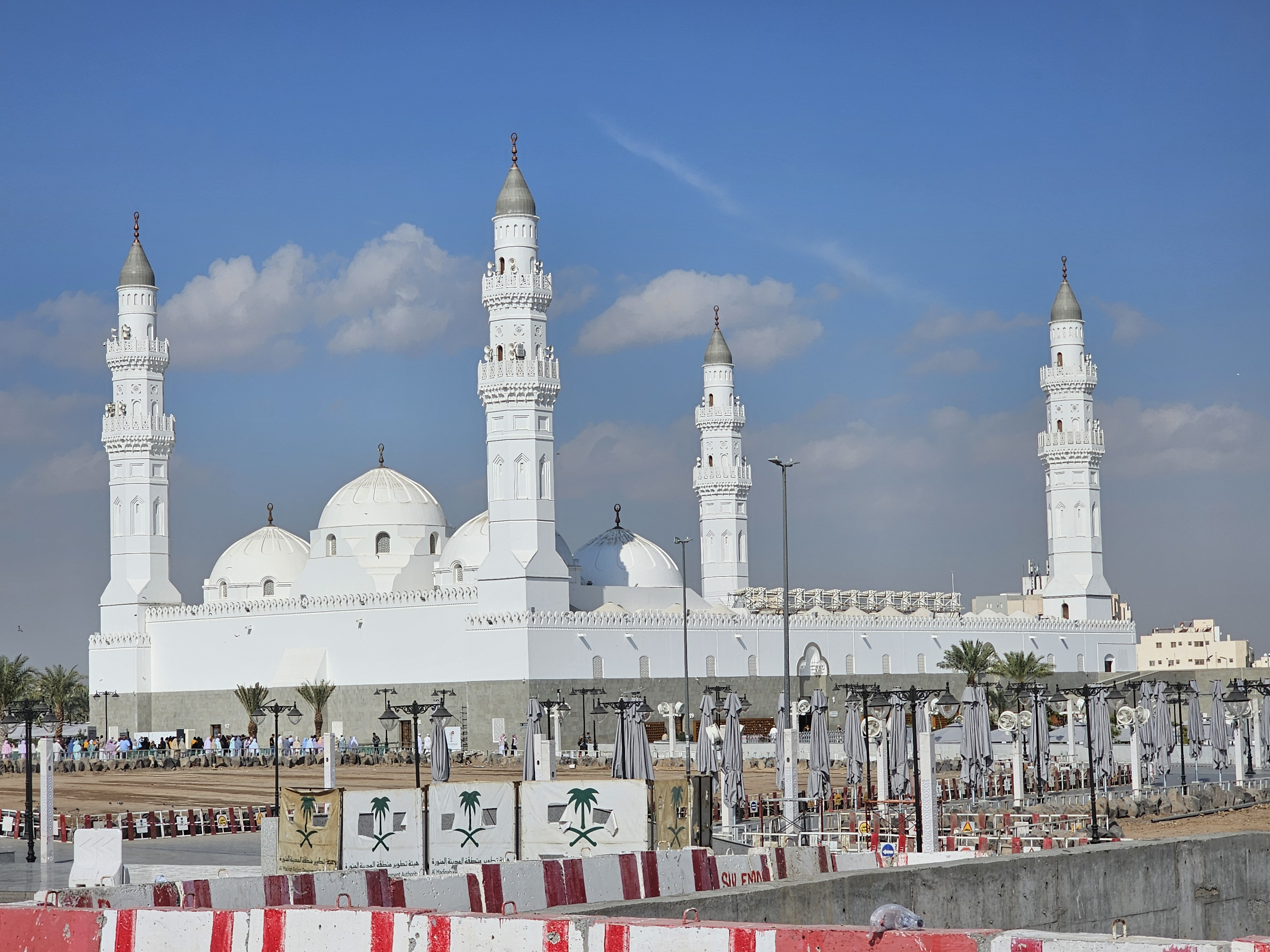
The Quba Mosque in Medina

Quba Mosque is the mosque located outside the Medina, was the first ever constructed mosque by Muhammad, and it holds a significant place in Islam according to the following Hadith:

Narrated by Sahl ibn Hunayf: The Prophet (ﷺ) said: "Whoever purifies himself in his house, then comes to Masjid Quba and prays in it, will have a reward like that of an Umrah"

== Historically Significant Sites ==
=== Umayyad Mosque ===
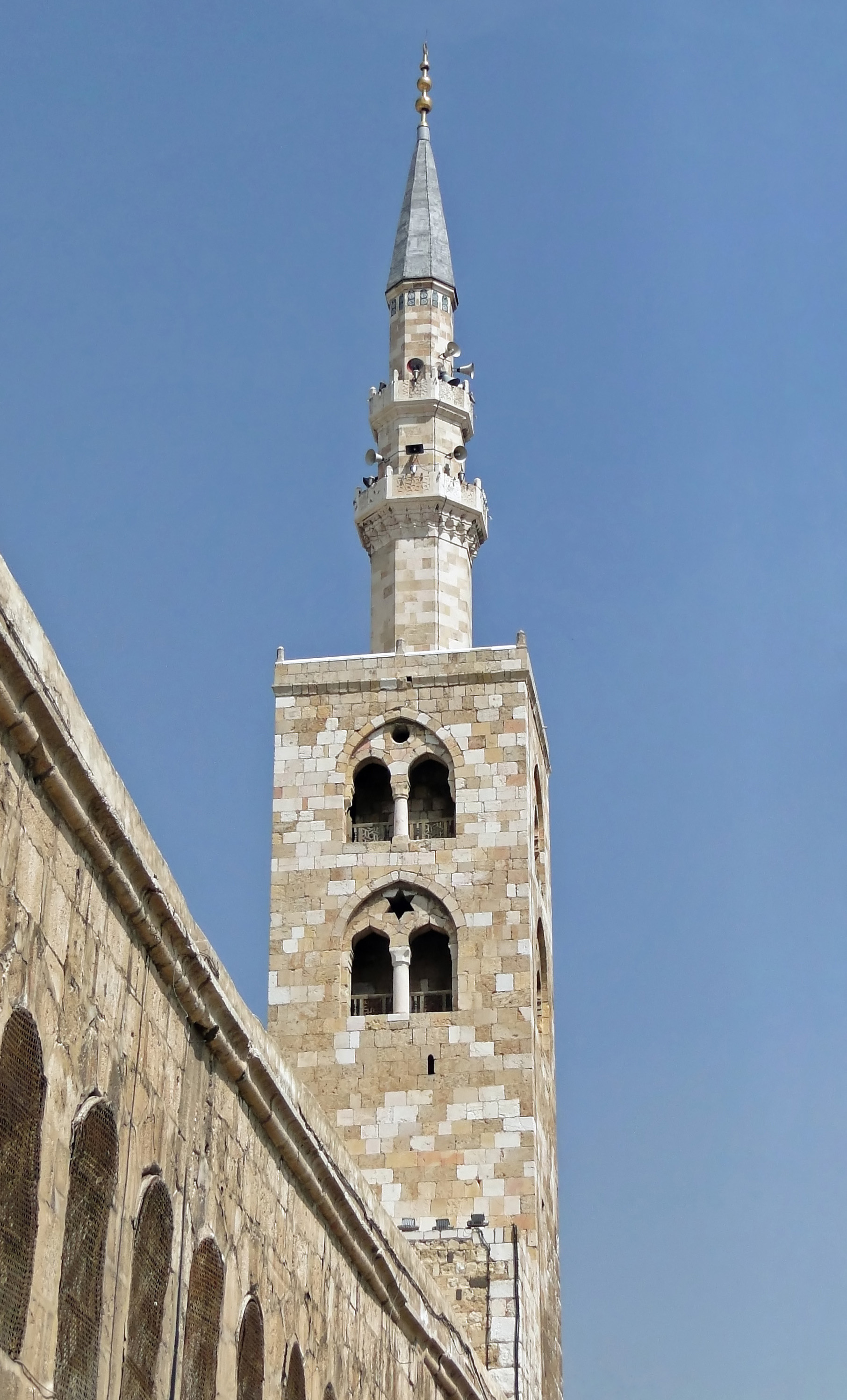
Umayyad Mosque (on the right) with the Minaret of Isa (on the left)

Umayyad Mosque in Damascus is considered by some Muslims to be the fourth holiest site in Islam. One of the four authorized copies of the Quran was kept here, and the head of Yahya ibn Zakariyya is believed to be in the shrine.

The Minaret of Isa in the Umayyad Mosque is dedicated to Isa (Jesus), and it is believed that he will return to the world at the minaret during the time of a Fajr prayer and it is believed that he will pray at the mosque with the Islamic leader of that time Mahdi. It is believed that prayers in the mosque are considered to be equal to those offered in Jerusalem.

=== Ibrahimi Mosque ===
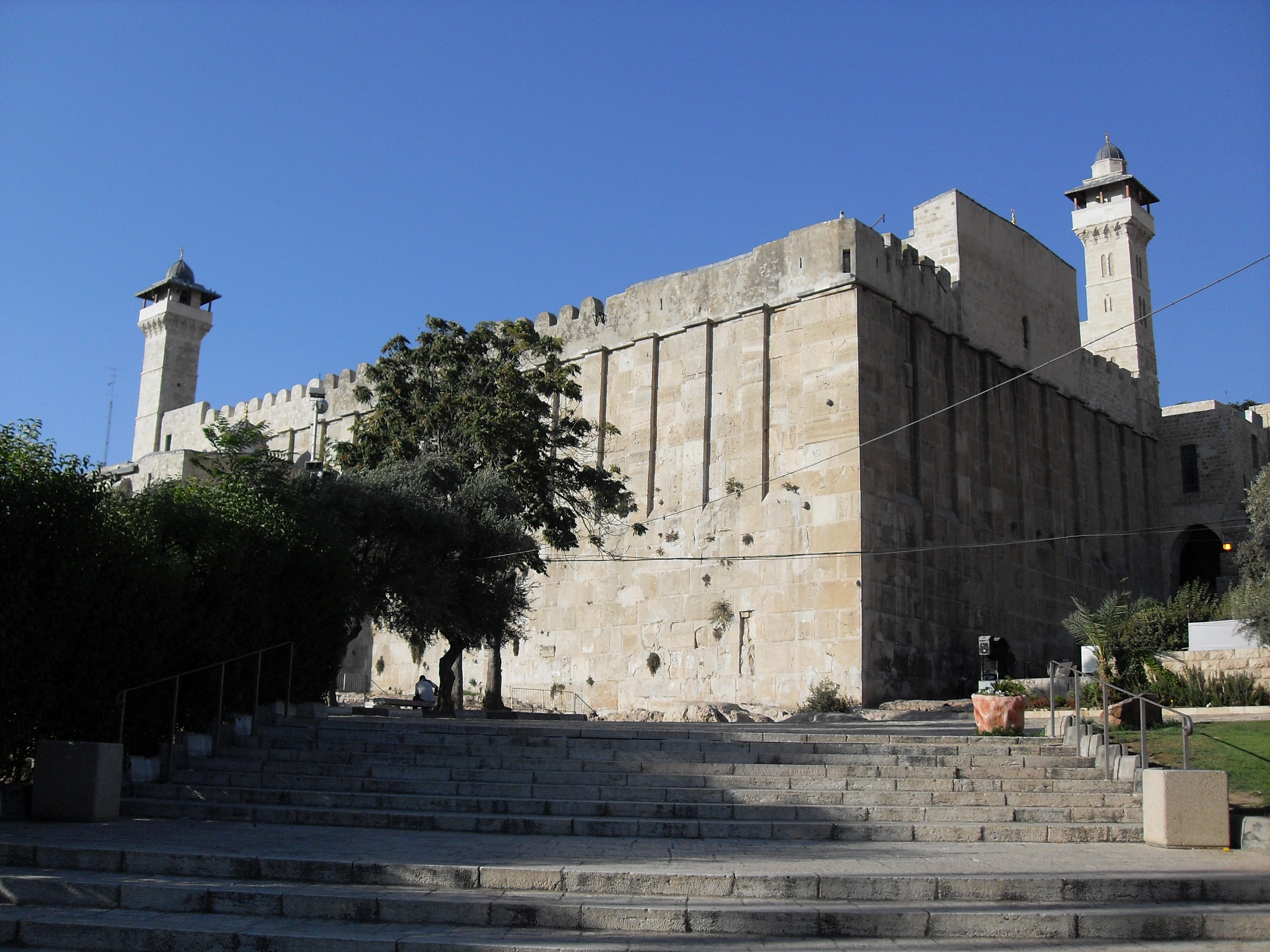
Southern view of the Mosque.

Ibrahimi Mosque in Hebron, West Bank, Palestine, is believed to contain the graves of the Prophet Abraham and some of his family, and is for that reason also considered by some Sunni Muslims the fourth holiest site in the world.

=== Other places ===
- Cave of Hira is located on the mountain called Jabal al-Nour, is the cave where the first verses of the Quran were revealed to Muhammad.
- Masjid al-Qiblatain in Medina, Saudi Arabia is the mosque where the direction of prayer (qibla) was changed from Jerusalem to Mecca.
- Al-Baqi' is the oldest Islamic cemetery, where Caliph Uthman, Fatimah, Caliph Hasan ibn Ali and Aisha were buried.

== See also ==
- Holy city
- Holiest sites in Islam
