= Sulayman al-Ruhayli =

Saudi Islamic imam

Sheikh Sulayman Al-Ruhayli

Personal life
- Born: Sulayman bin Salimullah bin Rajaullah bin Buti al-Ruhayli al-Harbi; October 1966 (age 59–60) Madinah, Saudi Arabia
- Children: 7 (5 Sons, 2 Daughters)
- Occupation: Cleric, Imam
- Website: www.sualruhaily.com

Religious life
- Religion: Islam
- Denomination: Sunni
- Jurisprudence: Hanbali
- Creed: Athari
- Movement: Salafism

Muslim leader
- Influenced by: Ibn Taymiyya; Muhammad ibn Abd al-Wahhab; Ibn Baz; Al-Albani; al-Uthaymin; Abu Bakr al-Jaza'iri

YouTube information
- Channel: الموقع الرسمي لفضيلة الشيخ أ. د. سليمان الرحيلي
- Genre: Islamic
- Subscribers: 83,400
- Views: 2,605,533
- Last updated: 25 September 2026

Sulayman al-Ruhayli is an Islamic imam, preacher, and scholar who works and teaches at the Quba Mosque in Madinah, Saudi Arabia.

== Early life and education ==
Before age 6, Ruhayli began attending lessons and lectures at the Prophet's Mosque and regularly studied with Sheikh al-Amin al-Shinqiti, Umar Fatallah, and Abu Bakr al-Jaza'iri. He also attended the lessons of Sheikh Ibn Baz, al-Albani, and al-Uthaymin.

At 6, Ruhayli began memorizing the Quran with a member of his tribe, Atiq bin Jabir al-Ruhayli and memorized the Quran before age 10. After finishing Elementary School, al-Ruhayli enrolled at the Intermediate Institute at the Islamic University of Madinah. Soon after, he went to the university's High School program and then joined the Faculty of Sharia where he studied with scholars such as 'Ali al-Hudhayfi, Salih al-Suhaymi, and others.

== Biography ==
After graduating from the Faculty of Sharia, he joined the Department of Usool al-Fiqh as a teaching assistant and continues to teach at the Islamic University as a professor at all levels of the university. He offers lecture at both the Prophet's Mosque and Quba Mosque. He has also given lectures in other parts of world such as Kuwait, the United States, and more.

On March 28, 2020, the director general of the Ministry of Islamic Affairs in Madinah Provnice, Sheikh Qais Al-Muaiqili, appointed al-Ruhayli as the main Imam and Khatib of the Quba Mosque.

== Works ==
- Sharh Usool al-Thalatha
- Sharh Kitab al-Buyoo
- Sharh Qawaid al-Fiqhiyyah
- Min Fiqh al-Fitan
- Al-Tawil wa Atharuhu fi Usool al-Fiqh (Master's Thesis)
- Al Qawaid al-Mushtarakah bayna Usool al-Fiqh wa al-Qawaid al-Fiqhiyyah (Doctoral Thesis)
