= Abu Bakr al-Jaza'iri =

Algerian Sunni Islamic scholar (1921–2018)

Sheikh Abu Bakr al-Jaza'iri

Personal life
- Born: 1921 Lioua, Algeria
- Died: August 15, 2018 (aged 96–97) Madinah, Saudi Arabia
- Occupation: Cleric, Sheikh
- Website: www.algzaeri.com

Religious life
- Religion: Islam
- Denomination: Sunni
- Jurisprudence: Maliki
- Creed: Athari
- Movement: Salafism

Muslim leader
- Influenced by: Ibn Taymiyya; Al-Dhahabi; Ibn Kathir; Muhammad ibn Abd al-Wahhab; Muhammad ibn Ibrahim Al ash-Sheikh; Abdul-Rahman al-Sa'di

Abu Bakr al-Jaza'iri (1921 – 15 August 2018), was an Algerian Sunni Islamic scholar.

== Biography ==
al-Jazairi was born in 1921 in the village of Lioua, close to Tolga, which is located today in the state of Biskra Province in Algeria. In his hometown grew up and received his primary education, and began to memorize the Quran and some Islamic texts and jurisprudence of the Maliki madhhab, and then moved to the city of Biskra, where started to teach in a private school. Then he traveled with his family to Medina, and in the Prophet's Mosque resumed his education way to sit to the circles of scholars and sheikhs where he got permission from the Presidency of the judiciary in Mecca to teach in the Prophet's Mosque. He worked as a teacher in some schools of the Ministry of Education and in Dar Al Hadith in Madinah. When the Islamic University of Madinah opened its doors in 1961, he was one of its first teachers and teachers, and remained there until he retired in 1987. He is known for being the teachers of major scholars such as Sulayman al-Ruhayli, Saleh al-Maghamsi, and others.

He was under the teachings of sheiks as Naim Al-Nuaimi, Issa Mutawqi and Tayeb Al-Aqbi in Algeria, and Omar Berry and Mohammed Al-Hafiz in Medina.

Abu Bakr al-Jazairi was widely known for teaching in the Prophet's Mosque for 50 years and in Islamic University of Medina, which earned his lessons and books great momentum. His book The Platform of the Muslim is one of his most widely accepted works in the Arab countries. He refused to compliment by the financial sector and warned against riba in his book to the prayers. He wrote a book in particular his advice to every Shiite.

== Works ==
He has written a large number of works, including:

- Messages of the Algerian
- The Muslim curriculum
- The doctrine of the believer
- The Simplest of Interpretations of the Speech of The Great and Most High, a tafsir of the Qur'an
- Muslim woman
- Islamic country
- Fundamentals of Jurisprudence
- The perfection of the nation in the goodness of its faith
- These are the Jews
- Rahman appeals to the people of faith

== Death ==
He died in Medina on Wednesday 15 August 2018 at the age of 97.
