= Saleh Al-Maghamsi =

Saudi Islamic theologian and imam (born 1963)

Saleh bin Awad al-Maghamsi
- صالح بن عوض المغامسي
- Born: 17 November 1963 (age 62); Medina, Saudi Arabia
- Education: King Abdulaziz University
- Occupations: Islamic scholar, imam, preacher

Imam of Prophet's Mosque

Personal life
- Website: www.alrasekhoon.com

Religious life
- Religion: Islam
- Denomination: Sunni

Saleh bin Awad al-Maghamsi (Note: Arabic: صالح بن عواد المغامسي الحربي, ṣaleḥ bin `Awad al-Maġamsi) (born 17 November 1963) is a Saudi Arabian Islamic scholar, preacher, and imam. He is known for his work in Quran exegesis, religious education, and public preaching. In February 2026, he was appointed by a royal decree as an imam of the Prophet's Mosque in Medina, where he led his first Isha prayer on 21 February 2026. He has also served as imam and Khatib at Quba Mosque. He was a student of Ibn Baz among other Islamic scholars.

== Early life and education ==
Saleh al-Maghamsi was born in Medina Province, Saudi Arabia, in 1963. He grew up in an environment supportive of Islamic scholarship. He attended King Abdul Aziz University where he pursued formal studies in Arabic language and Islamic sciences. Throughout his education he received advanced religious training under prominent Saudi scholars, including Ibn Baz, Al-Uthaymin, Abu Bakr al-Jaza'iri and Mohammed Attia Salem.

== Career ==
He became Educational Supervisor in the Arabic Language Department in the General Directorate of Education in Al-Madina Al-Munawara circa 1991. Several years later (circa 1994) he became a member of the Islamic Awareness Commission for Hajj. In 1422H (circa 2001) he was appointed as Khatib (giving Friday khutbah sermon) at King Abdul Aziz Mosque in Al-Madina Al-Munawara, and worked there for several years. In 1426H (circa 2005) he became a member of the International Commission on Scientific Signs in Quran & Sunnah. He became imam of the Mosque of Quba in Al-Madina Al-Munawara circa 2006. He was appointed as the official mufti for Saudi Arabia Television Channel 1 the next year. He became General Manager for the Center of Research and studies in Al-Madina Al-Munawara circa 2010. He was appointed lecturer at the Superior Institute of Imams and Orators in Taibah University circa 2011. He has made many contributions and lectures on different Arabic and Gulf countries' satellite channels.

Al Maghamsi has been described as having close connections with King Salman. According to Foreign Policy magazine,

The new Saudi king recently served as head of the supervisory board for a Medina research center directed by Maghamsi. A year after Maghamsi’s offensive comments [on Osama bin Laden], Salman sponsored and attended a large cultural festival organized by the preacher. Maghamsi also advises two of Salman’s sons, one of whom took an adoring “selfie” with the preacher last year.

== Works ==
Recordings of his weekly lessons of interpretation in the Quba mosque in Medina have been released in five albums under the title Reflections verses.

Sheikh Saleh al Maghamsi has also monthly classes in Jeddah.

=== Website ===
Al-Rasekhoon fi Al-Elm (“Steadfast in knowledge”) is the official website of Saleh Bin Awad Al Maghamsi. According to the site, its name comes from a verse of the Quran, and aims to explicate the meanings of the Quran without neglecting the Sunna.

=== TV programs ===
- Pros of interpretation — a weekly program in the interpretation, on Al-Majd channel.
- Kattouf Dania — televised monthly meeting held every second Monday on TV channel Al-Majd
- Bahrain Complex — thirteen half-hour episode series on Al-Majd channel; recorded in three days
- Secretary place — on the Qatari channel every Wednesday
- Tafseer — on Noor Dubai channel

== Views and controversy ==
On March 27, 2012 on Qatar Television, Al-Maghamsi stated that although "Osama bin Laden's organization" did great harm to the Muslim nation (umma) he "has more sanctity and honor than any infidel"—infidel being defined as “Jews, Christians, Zoroastrians, apostates, and atheists”.

In 2014, during the controversy over whether women may be allowed to reveal their faces in public, i.e. need not wear a niqāb, Al-Maghamsi said it is "always better to be modest though he admitted that not all scholars agree that women should not reveal their faces". In 2016, Al-Maghamasi stated that listening to music is not haram, asserting, "The nation is in dire need of renewal and modernization, and I strongly believe in this, whether people accept my views or not." Additionally, he expressed the view that non-Muslims should be permitted to enter the city of Mecca.

Al-Maghamsi has also come out in favor of "taking care of historical mosques", stating that such a practice is not unorthodox but religious and an act of worship.

== See also ==
- Islam in Saudi Arabia
