= Mahamid =

Mahameed
المحاميد

Religion
- Sunni Islam (Hanbali)

Related ethnic groups
- Harb (tribe)

The Mahamid (Arabic: المحاميد, romanized: al-Maḥāmīd) are an Arab tribe that traces its origins to the Khawlaniyah al-Qahtaniyah Harb. The majority of them resided originally in Yemen, the Hijaz, between Mecca and Medina, and then spread in the Arabian Peninsula and the countries of the Maghreb, which are considered among the Arab tribes spread throughout the Arab countries.

== Tribe biography ==
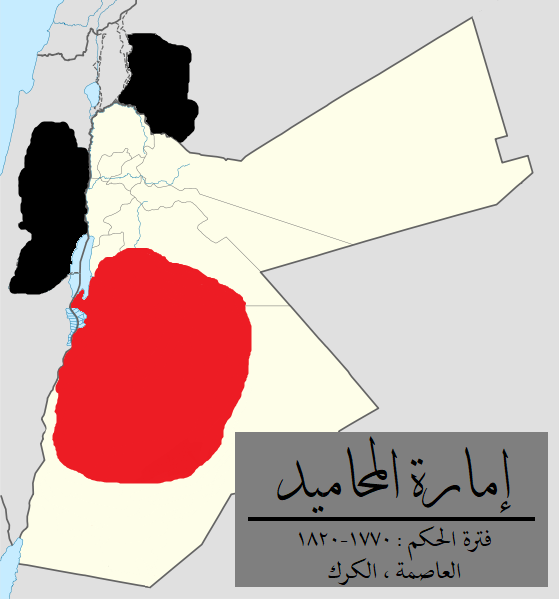
The Emirate of Mahamid is in red, and the areas of immigration after the fall of the emirate are in black

Their biography is repeated in the frequent travels, emigration and instability during their travels from their homes by origin, and their biography indicates that when the tribe enlarged and narrowed their area of residence in Yemen, Najd, and Hijaz, they gathered to take opinions about what they need to do, and some of them said we conquer the tribes, and this suggestion was rejected because most of those in the neighborhood Among them were clans and sub-clans from the Harb tribe, and from them all five gathered together, i.e. those who were united by the fifth grandfather and suggested leaving and settled their opinion on him.

And the last thing known of their cousins is that they went to the Dumat Al-Jandal area in the north, settled there for a period of time, and then moved towards the Levant.

They moved until they reached the Al-Karak region and settled, and they allied themselves with some of the tribes in Al-Karak and the most prominent of them were Al-'Amr of Bani 'Uqbah.

== Tribe spread ==
The Arabian Peninsula:

Saudi Arabia

The tribe is divided into several branches, and they are:

- alrtuei
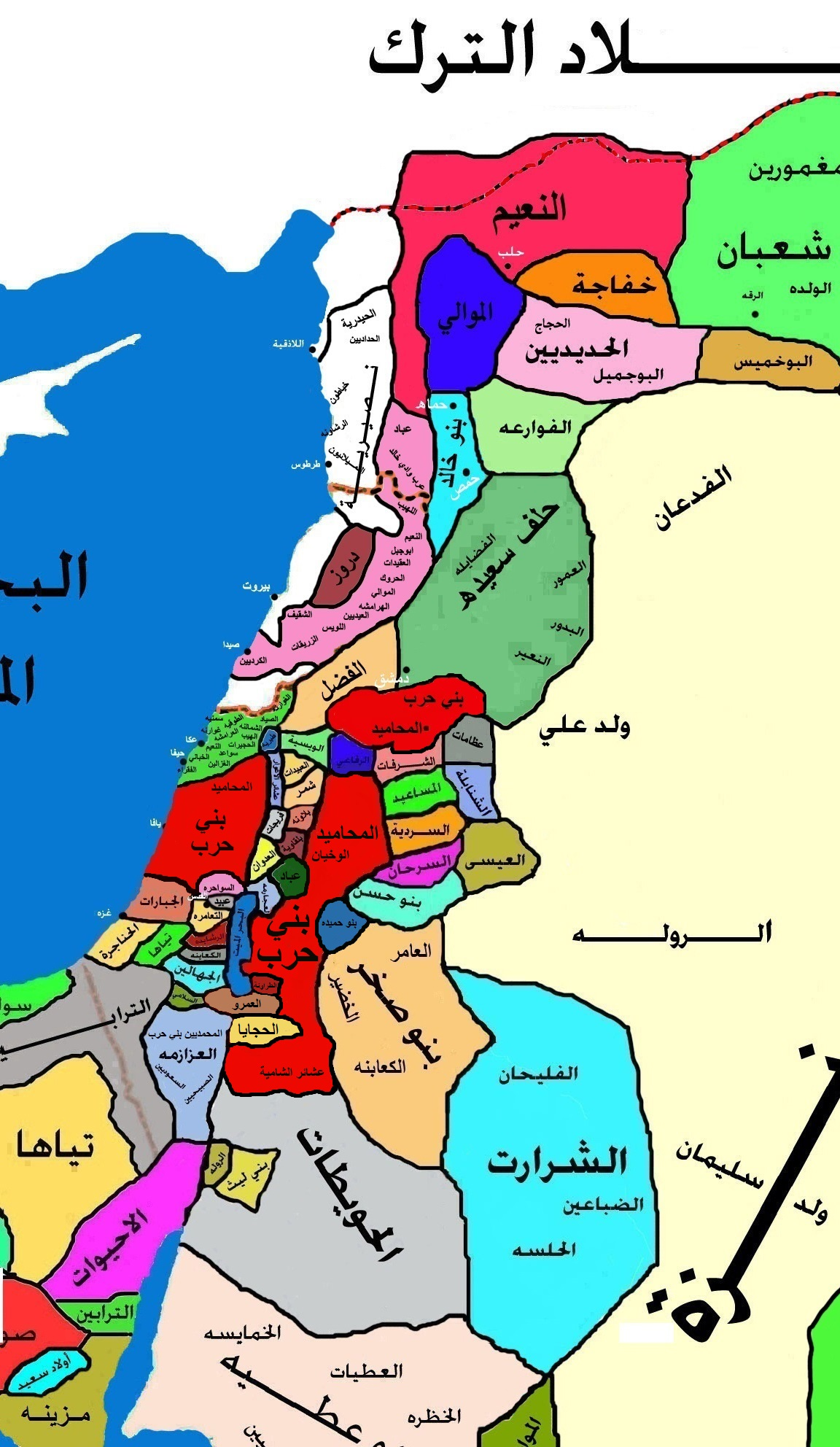
  Homes of Mahamid tribe in the Levant (In red)
- almatiei
- almadhakir
- almuhabida
- alrathea

Kuwait

The Levant and Iraq:

Syria

Branched out from them:

- The Hourani

Jordan

Branched out from them:

- Al Abdul Dayem
- Al-Shaleikh
- Al-Bahri
- Ayal Abdo
- The Abu Karaki family (the Mahamid who came from Daraa, immigrated from them to Umm al-Fahm, after which to the Karak governorate)
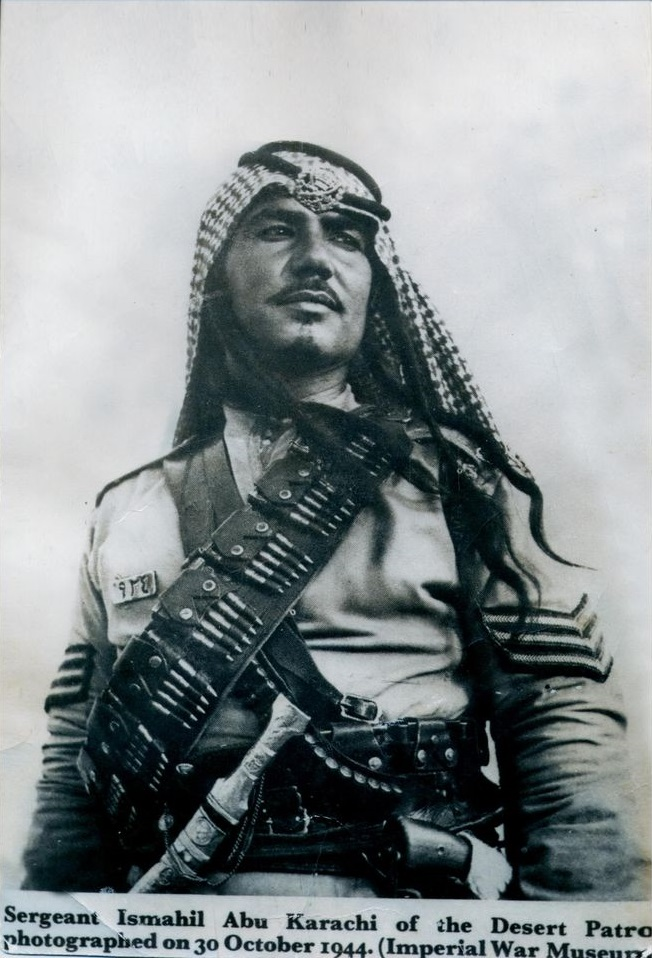
  Mahamid sergeant archived at the Imperial War Museum
- The Mahameed alliance with Al-Huwaitat.
- The Mahameed alliance with Bani Abbad.
- The Mahameed alliance with Bani Hamida
- The Mahameed alliance with Zoubi

Palestine

Branched out from them:

- kiawan
- alkhudur
- alsawalima
- alhamamada
- almusaeada
- alhasasana
- aljeayisa
- dar alearabi
- al'asead
- al'ahmad

Iraq

Arab Africa
