= Dalal Al-Bizri =

Lebanese researcher, writer, and lecturer

Dalal Al-Bizri (Arabic: دلال البزري) is a Lebanese researcher, writer, and lecturer. She was born in Lebanon, lived for more than ten years in Cairo in Egypt where she conducted researches on sociology before going back to settle in Beirut again after the Arab Uprising.

Al-Bizri was the director of the review "Bāḥit̲āt" published by the Union of Lebanese Women Researchers in 1994. She is a regular columnist in several media such as Courrier International, Al-Mustaqbal, and Nawafidh.

== Publications and Arab Uprising thoughts ==
Al-Bizri work focuses on studying the political and social aspects of Egypt. She published in 2008, Egypt against Egypt then in 2011, Egypt is on my mind.

She is known as a liberal and critical thinker as she wrote many times about Islam and fundamentalism. She co-authored several studies and books about Women in Egypt and Lebanon and the Islamic movements.

In 2017, Al-Bizri published Journals of the Lebanese Civil War, a book that recalls the different phases of the Lebanese Civil War, the division of east and west Beirut, the political assassinations of Kamal Jumblatt in 1977, and Bachir Gemayel in 1982, the Sabra and Shatila massacre in 16–18 September 1982. The book reflects the civil war as lived in Lebanon and the current Syrian crisis.
