= Khobayti =

Arabian style of music

Khobayti (Arabic: خبيتي), also spelled Khubaiti, is an Arabian style of music that implements Khaliji rhythms. Khobayti originates from Hejaz, where it was performed during zār rituals. Frame drums are a prominent aspect of khobayti. In 21st century Saudi popular music, khobayti is the most prevalent polyrhythm and it was featured in Saudi Arabia's exhibit at Expo 2020 in Dubai.
