= Dalal Bruchmann =

Austrian actor and musician

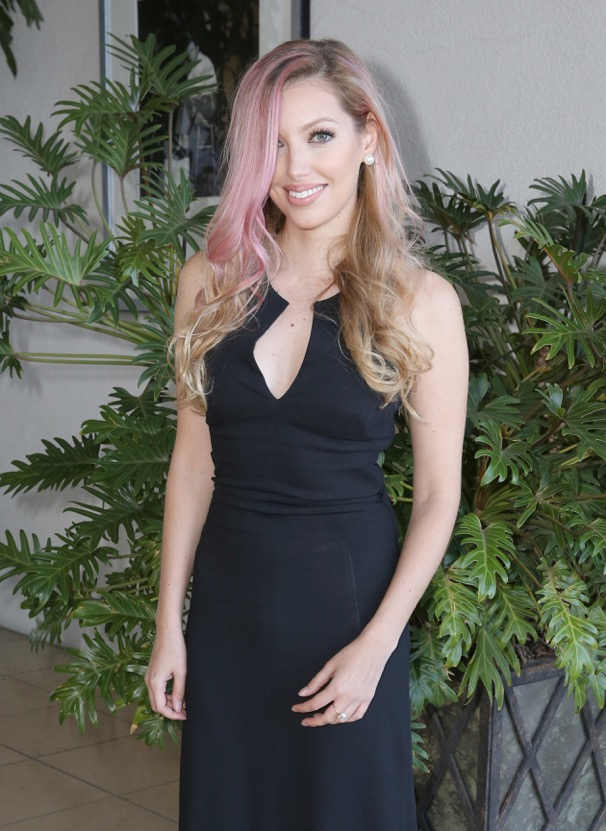
- Dalal at the 2017 Crystal & Lucy Awards

Background information
- Born: 30 April 1990 (age 36); Austria
- Genres: Pop, dance, classical, soundtrack
- Occupations: Musician, singer, composer, actress
- Instruments: Vocals, violin, piano
- Years active: 2007–present
- Website: dalal-music.com

Dalal Bruchmann is an Austrian musician, recording artist, composer and actress.

== Career ==
Bruchmann is a longtime musician having attended the Broadway Connection music school at the age of 12. Her debut single "Taste the Night" was released digitally in 2011, including remixes from Tony Moran. A video was shot in Los Angeles and premiered on AOL Music the same year. After being added to YouTube, the video was viewed over 1.2 million times.

Bruchmann performed "Taste the Night" at the 2012 New York Fashion Week, Couture Fashion Week in New York and the Fender Music Lodge at Sundance Film Festival.

In 2014, Bruchmann released the single "Suddenly". The song was played on the radio in the United States, Australia, Canada, United Kingdom and Germany.

Bruchmann's single "Superman" was written with Nate "Impact" Jolley for the film Hair: A Documentary in 2015. The song was later nominated for a Hollywood Music in Media Award in the "Best Song - Documentary" category.

Bruchmann released a contemporary classical EP The Quiet Heart on 13 October 2017 through The Orchard, a subsidiary of Sony Music. Dalal is the solo artist on the project EINAUDI, playing compositions by renowned Italian composer Ludovico Einaudi for Warner Classics. The first single "Einaudi: Nuvole Bianche" has been released on 29 June 2018, followed by a second single on 20 July 2018 titled "Einaudi: Le Onde".

Bruchmann currently lives in Los Angeles and works in both in England and the United States. Her ancestor Franz von Bruchmann was a lyricist for Franz Schubert.

== Discography ==
Albums

- 2018: The 50 Greatest Einaudi Pieces – Label: Warner Classics
- 2019: The Einaudi Sound – Label: Warner Classics
- 2019: Indigo Valley Original Motion Picture Soundtrack – Label: Gold Eagle Entertainment LLC

Singles

- 2011: "Taste the Night" – Label: Ingrooves / Universal Music
- 2014: "Suddenly" – Label: Gold Eagle Entertainment LLC
- 2014: "Superman" – Label: Gold Eagle Entertainment LLC
- 2018: "Einaudi: Nuvole Bianche" – Label: Warner Classics
- 2018: "Einaudi: Divenire" – Label: Warner Classics
- 2018: "Einaudi: Le Onde" – Label: Warner Classics
- 2018: "Einaudi: Una Mattina" – Label: Warner Classics
- 2018: "Einaudi: I Giorni" – Label: Warner Classics
- 2018: "Einaudi: Fly" – Label: Warner Classics
- 2020: "An Old Fashioned Mystery" – Label: Gold Eagle Entertainment LLC
- 2020: "A Precipice of Lamplight" – Label: Gold Eagle Entertainment LLC

EPs

- 2017: The Quiet Heart – Label: The Orchard / Sony Music

Film Music

- 2015: Hair (Documentary) – Composer
- 2016: First Comes Like – Composer
- 2019: Indigo Valley – Composer
- 2019: Beyond Moving – Composer
- 2019: Hurt By Paradise – Composer
- 2019: The Shot – Composer

== Filmography ==
Year	Film	Role	Notes
2005	SOKO Donau	Lisa	2 episodes
2007	Die Geschworene	Daniela	1 episode
2011	Into the Darkness	Katelyn	Filming/releasing in 2011
