= Dalal Abu Amneh =

Palestinian poet, singer, teacher

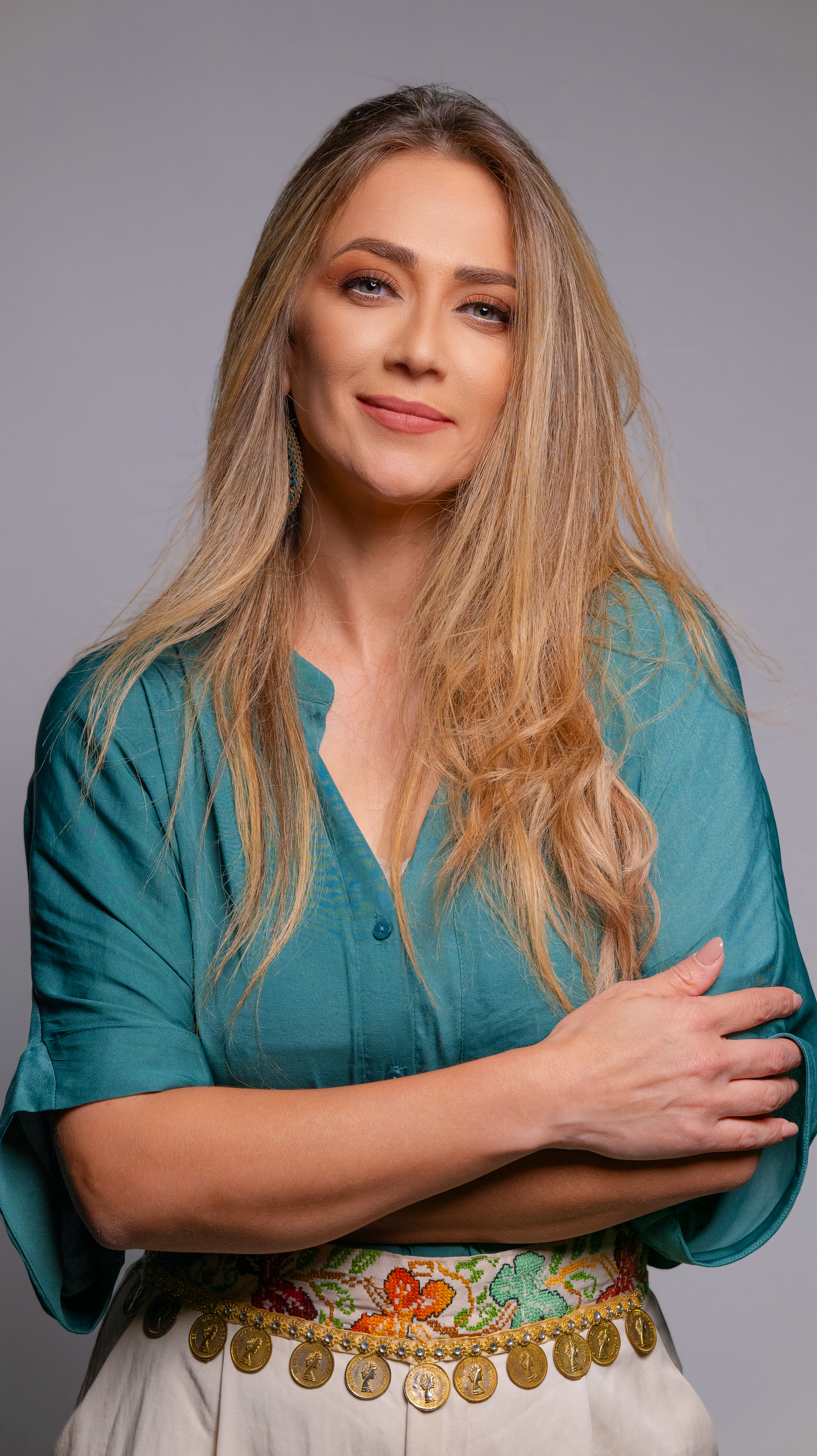
- Dalal Abu Amneh in 2022

Background information
- Born: Dalal Ghazi Muhammad Abu Amneh دلال غازي محمد أبو آمنة; 9 August 1983 (age 43); Nazareth, Israel
- Genres: Palestinian music, Arabic music
- Occupations: Singer, producer, neuroscientist
- Instrument: Vocals
- Years active: 1997–present
- Spouse: Anan Abbasi

Dalal Ghazi Muhammad Abu Amneh (Arabic: دلال غازي محمد أبو آمنة; born 9 August 1983) is a Palestinian-Israeli singer, producer, and neuroscientist.

== Early life and career ==
Abu Amneh was born on 1983 in the city of Nazareth in the Northern District of Israel. She grew up in an Arab Muslim middle class family in Nazareth and has four sisters. She graduated with a bachelor's degree in cognitive science at the Hebrew University of Jerusalem. For her doctoral degree in neuroscience, she attended the Technion Israel Institute of Technology and completed her dissertation in 2019.

She started singing at the age of four, where she participated in the Spring Princess competition and won the title for the song "Maryam Maryamti" in 1987. At the age of sixteen, she was known for her elaborate performance of authentic songs and old roles, in addition to her performance of songs of Palestinian and Levantine heritage. Prominent musicians of the Arab world, such as Salah Al-Sharnoubi and Assala, witnessed her and praised her voice, which in their opinion combines authenticity and modernity.

She is known for presenting committed human art and works to develop Palestinian art so that it preserves its originality on the one hand and simulates the young generation and the Western listener on the other hand, as a means of consolidating the Palestinian identity and supporting the causes of the Palestinian people. Abu Amneh participated in important international and Arab festivals, such as the Jerash Festival in Jordan and the Arab Music Festival at the Egyptian Opera House. She represented Palestine in several Arab operettas, such as the Land of the Prophets operetta 2012 and the Freedom Call operetta 2014. She also participates permanently in cultural and artistic evenings locally, Arably and internationally. In addition to her participation in her own band, Abu Amneh is the lead singer in the international orchestra MESTO, through which she presents songs of Arab and Palestinian heritage, accompanied by Western musicians, with orchestral arrangements all over the world.

Abu Amneh released several songs that gained wide popularity, such as "I am my heart and my soul is your sacrifice" in 2001, the words of Adnan Abbasi, composed by the artist Alaa Azzam, distributed by Habib Shehadeh, and recorded at Karem Matar Khalini Fei Balak Studios in 2003, and released two albums: "Karim Ya Ramadan" "2007", And the album "On My Country" 2013, an album that talks about Palestine in its various aspects and in a variety of lyrical styles. One of its songs was "Ain Al-Majra", which was on the list of the most successful songs on the radio, and the song "Bakrah Jadeed", which was among the five selected songs at the Euromed International Festival 2006.

In 2022, she declined an invitation to perform at the Dubai Expo due to the UAE's normalization of relations with Israel.

== Social media controversy ==
Abu Amneh was arrested on 16 October 2023 by the Israel Police at her home in Nazareth after posting on social media the statement, "There is no victor but God" together with an emoji of a Palestinian flag, on the evening of the Hamas attack against Israel on 7 October 2023. The police claimed that the post was hate speech that incited violence. She was charged with threatening public peace, resisting arrest and threatening an officer. She was released on 18 October 2023 and placed under house arrest for five days and ordered not to make any further social media posts about the Gaza war for 45 days. The charges against her were later dismissed by an Israeli judge.

Abu Amneh has claimed that the message was one expressing her faith and was not intended to favor one side or the other in the conflict, and that her social media team added the Palestinian flag emoji to the post without her knowledge.

== Personal life ==
Abu Amneh identifies as a pacifist and is an adherent of Sufism, a mystical tradition of Islam. She grew up in a mixed Palestinian and Jewish community in Israel and is fluent in both Hebrew and Arabic. She is married to Anan Abbasi, an ophthalmologist and the deputy director of the HaEmek Medical Center, and has two children with him.

== Honors and awards ==
Abu Amneh was honored in dozens of festivals in Palestine and the Arab world for her role in supporting humanitarian causes. She contributed to preserving the artistic heritage in the Arab world, at the Festival of the Arab States Broadcasting Union in Tunisia, 2015. She was a model Palestinian woman at the Palestinian Festival in Houston in 2015 and Best Artistic Personality in Palestine by the Lady of the Land Foundation in 2016, and the best female figures in Palestine by the Palestinian Ministry of Culture in 2017.
