= Dalal bint Mukhled Al-Harbi =

Dalal bint Mukhled Al-harbi
- Born: 19?? Taif
- Education: Majored in modern history
- Occupation: Professor-writer -politician
- Employer: Professor of History in Princess Noura Bint Abdul Rahman University.
- Organization: The Saudi "Shura" Council

Dalal bint Mukhled Al-Harbi (Arabic: دلال بنت مخلد الحربي) is a Saudi historian known for her research on the history of women and their leadership roles in the Arabian Peninsula. She has been a member of the Saudi Shura Council since January 15, 2013. Al-Harbi has received numerous awards for her contributions, including the King Abdulaziz Book Award in 2019.

== Biography ==
Al-Harbi was born and raised in Taif, Saudi Arabia. She received her early education in Taif and later moved to Riyadh, where she completed her university studies. Al-Harbi began her academic career as a teaching assistant at the College of Education for Girls, specializing in the Department of History. She went on to earn a master's degree with a dissertation titled "The Relationship of the Sultanate of Najd and its Annexes with Britain (1344-1345 AH / 1915-1927 AD)." She later obtained a doctorate in the same department with her dissertation titled "The Relationship of the Sultanate of Lahj with Britain (1377-1378 AH / 1918-1959 AD)."

After completing her education, Al-Harbi joined the faculty of the college as an assistant professor before moving to the College of Arts. She gradually advanced in her academic career and eventually attained the rank of professor.

Throughout her university life, Al-Harbi focused on scientific research, delving deep into her field of specialization. Her unique contribution lies in her exploration of the history of women in the Arabian Peninsula, particularly in Saudi Arabia. Her efforts have led to the publication of several books and studies, gaining recognition both domestically and internationally. Al-Harbi's work has been featured in scientific journals and the media, earning her two local awards for her contributions.

In addition to her academic pursuits, Al-Harbi is an active writer and journalist. She regularly publishes articles in a weekly column titled "Al-Bawareh" in Al-Jazeera newspaper, where she covers various social, educational, and scientific topics. She has received numerous letters of appreciation for her journalistic writings.

Al-Harbi is a member of several scientific and professional societies, including the British Historical Society, the American Historical Society, the Saudi Historical Society, and the Society for History and Archeology of the Gulf Cooperation Council countries. She also contributes her expertise as a member of charitable societies and serves on scientific and cultural councils, including the Board of Trustees of the Princess Jawaher Bint Nayef Center for Research and Development of Women. Al-Harbi's advisory roles extend to being a part-time advisor to the High Authority for the Development of Riyadh. Moreover, she played a significant role in establishing the Saudi Society for Heritage Preservation and has chaired cultural committees beyond the university setting. Al-Harbi's expertise is sought after as a member of the advisory board for scientific journals, including Al-Diriyah magazine, Al-Mesbar magazine, and Islam and Contemporary World magazine.

== Awards and honors ==
Al-Harbi's contributions have been recognized through numerous awards and honors, including:

- Prince Salman bin Abdulaziz Prize for Studies of the History of the Arabian Peninsula (1429-1430 AH / 2008-2009 AD)
- Ministry of Culture and Information Prize for the book History Branch (1432 AH / 2012 AD)
- Civil Secretary Award for Research in the History of the Arabian Peninsula (seventh session, 2019)
- King Abdulaziz Book Prize (fourth session, 2019) for her book The Kingdom of Saudi Arabia and the Global Economic Crisis, Reflections, and Solutions 1348-1352 AH / 1929-1933 AD

Al-Harbi has been honored with various medals, shields, and accolades from different institutions and organizations, recognizing her contributions to academia and historical research.

== Books and studies on women ==
- The book "Famous Women of Najd", and this book was translated into English under the title: Prominent Women from Central Arabia, 2008.
- The book "The Contribution of Women to the Endowment of Books in the Najd region."
- The book “Women in Najd: Their Status and Role” (1200-1351 AH / 1786-1932 AD).
- The book "Ghalia Buqmiya".
- Study: Ghalia Al-Buqmiya: Her Life and Role in Resisting Muhammad Ali Pasha's Campaign on Soil.
- Study: Women in the Kingdom of Saudi Arabia "Past and Present."
- Study: Meccan Women and the Characteristic of Place.
- Study: “The endowment of Princess Sarah bint Imam Abdullah bin Faisal bin Turki Al Saud.”
- Study: “Fatimah Al-Sabhan: Her Life and Role in the Emirate of the Rasheed Family.”
- Study: "Noura bint Abdul Rahman bin Faisal Al Saud."
- Study: Reforming the girls ’khattab" in the Hijaz through an official document (1350 AH / 1932 CE).

== Other books and studies ==
- Book: The relationship of the Sultanate of Lahj with Britain.
- Book: King Abdulaziz and the Strategy for Dealing with Events (The Case of Jeddah).
- Book: First and Second Saudi State News in the International Arab Encyclopedia.
- Study: “The Journey of Prince Faisal bin Abdulaziz to the United States of America (1364 AH / 1945AD).”
- Study: The evolution of the name of the Saudi state from the Najdi Sultanate to the Kingdom of Saudi Arabia (1339-1351 AH / 1920-1932 AD).
- Study: Internal conditions in Jeddah during the siege period (1343-1344 AH / 1924-1925 AD) through Al-Hijaz Post newspaper.
- Study: “King Faisal’s visit to Africa in 1392 AH / 1972 CE to consolidate the idea of Islamic solidarity”
- Study: "History of the Ruling Dynasties in the Arabian Peninsula".
- Study: "King Abdulaziz and the Care of the Yemenis in Britain in the Second World War."
- Book: The Kingdom of Saudi Arabia and the Global Economic Crisis, Implications, and Solutions 1348-1352 AH / 1929-1933 CE.
