= Quba Mosque =

Mosque in Medina, Saudi Arabia

- مَسْجِد قُبَاء
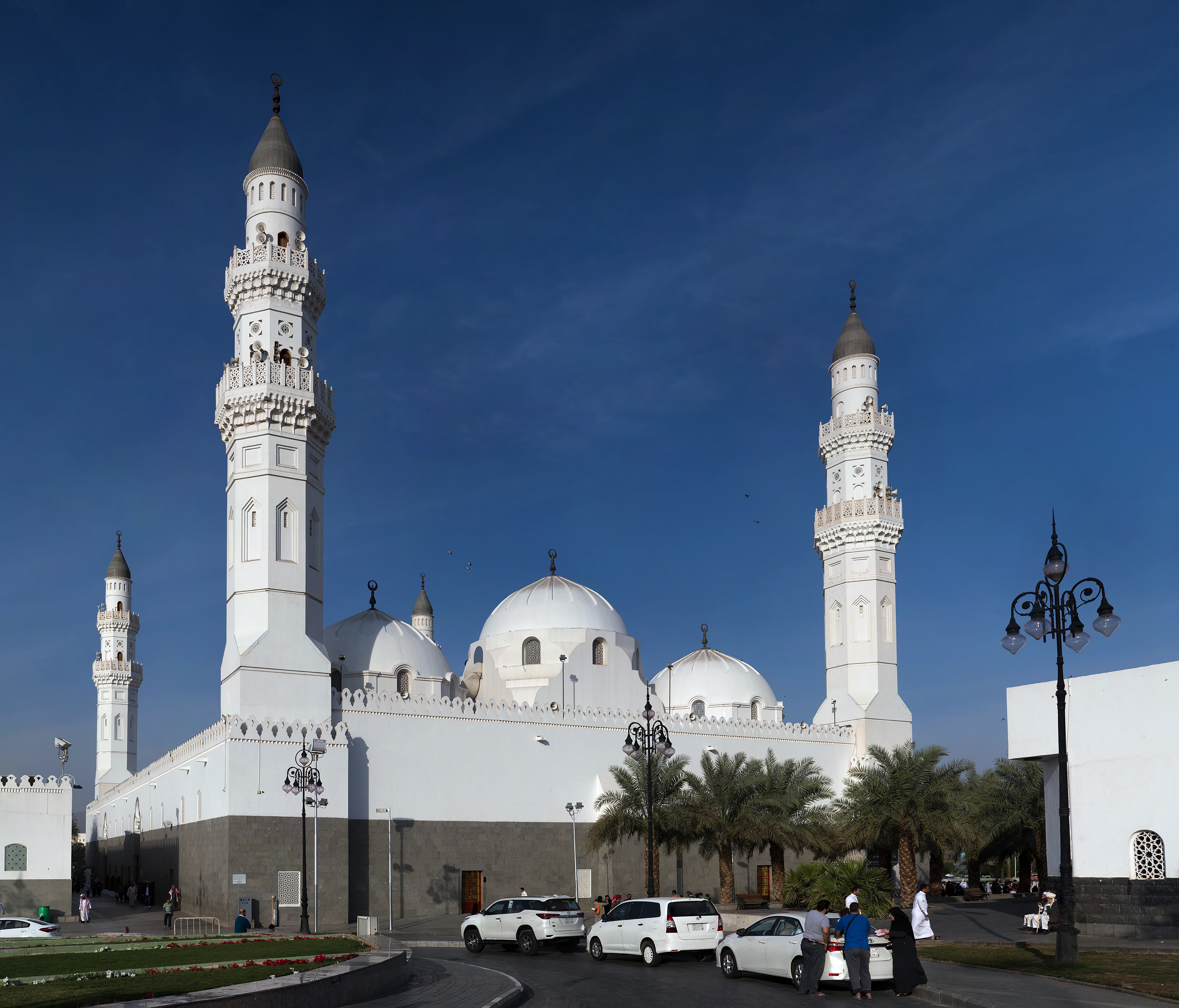

Religion
- Affiliation: Islam
- Ecclesiastical or organisational status: Mosque
- Status: Active

Location
- Location: Medina, Hejaz, Medina Province
- Country: Saudi Arabia
- Interactive map of Quba Mosque
- Coordinates: 24°26′21″N 39°37′02″E

Architecture
- Architects: Abdel-Wahed El-Wakil (the current structure, based on the older design)
- Type: Mosque
- Style: Islamic
- Established: 622 (original)
- Completed: 1986 (current)

Specifications
- Dome: 6 (main domes)
- Minarets: 4 (current); 1 (former)

The Quba Mosque (Note: Arabic: مَسْجِد قُبَاء, romanized: Masjid Qubāʾ; standard pronunciation: [mas.dʒid qu.baːʔ]; Hejazi Arabic pronunciation: [mas.dʒɪd ɡʊ.ba]) is a mosque located in Medina in the Hejaz region of Saudi Arabia, first built in the lifetime of the Islamic prophet Muhammad in the 7th century. It is thought to be the first mosque in the world, established on the first day of Muhammad's emigration to Medina. Its first stone is said to have been laid by the prophet, and the structure completed by his companions. The mosque was subsequently modified across the centuries until the 1980s, when it was completely replaced by a new building that stands today.

== History ==
=== Origins ===
According to historical Islamic texts, during the hijrah (migration) of Muhammad from Mecca to Medina, he stopped in the village of Quba' near Medina. Depending on the sources, he stayed there for 3 to 22 days. Two different accounts of the mosque's foundation exist in relation to this event. In one, Muhammad founded the mosque himself, though there are varying explanations for how the site was chosen: it was either a mirbad (place for drying dates) that belonged to Muhammad's host, Kulthum, or it was the place where a woman named Labba had tethered her donkey. Another version, probably a later legend inspired by the foundation story of the Prophet's Mosque in Medina, tells that Muhammad made Ali get on a camel and then built the mosque where the camel went. Muhammad is said to have laid the first stone himself, with the next ones laid by Abu Bakr, Umar and Uthman. He is also said to have visited the mosque every Saturday afterwards and conducted religious service there. In another account, the mosque had been built prior to Muhammad's arrival by the first Muslim emigrants from Mecca and some of the Anṣār of Medina. Muhammad then prayed in the mosque with them.

Some scholars have debated the historicity of the mosque's foundation story. Leone Caetani questioned whether Muhammad recognized other mosques in this way and argued that the story is likely a later invention, part of a trend by later Muslims to associate various mosques with Muhammad's life. Johannes Pedersen supported the story's plausibility, arguing that there are indications in the Qur'an and other traditional sources that other mosques indeed existed and were recognized in Muhammad's time.

Initially, the mosque was built 6 kilometres (3.7 miles) from Medina in the village of Quba', before Medina expanded to include this village. The first mosque would have been oriented towards Jerusalem and Muhammad most likely rebuilt it when the qibla (direction of prayer) was changed toward the Kaaba in Mecca.

=== Modifications ===
The mosque was repeatedly modified and expanded in later periods. It was expanded under Caliph Uthman (r. 644 – 656 CE). Another expansion occurred in 684 CE, during the reign of the Umayyad caliph Abd al-Malik ibn Marwan. Under his successor, al-Walid I (r. 705–715), the mosque was rebuilt. Its first "minaret" was added under Umar ibn Abd al-Aziz (r. 717–720).

Another renovation occurred in 1044, when a mihrab (niche symbolizing the qibla) was added by Sharif Abu Ya'la Ahmad ibn Hasan (or Abu Yali al-Husayni). Further additions were made around 80 years later. Later renovations were made by the Zengid vizier Jamal al-Din al-Isfahani in 1160. During the Mamluk era, Sultan al-Nasir Muhammad ibn Qalawun reconstructed the mosque in 1333, the ceiling was redone under al-Ashraf Barsbay in 1436, and Qaytbay made renovations in 1476.

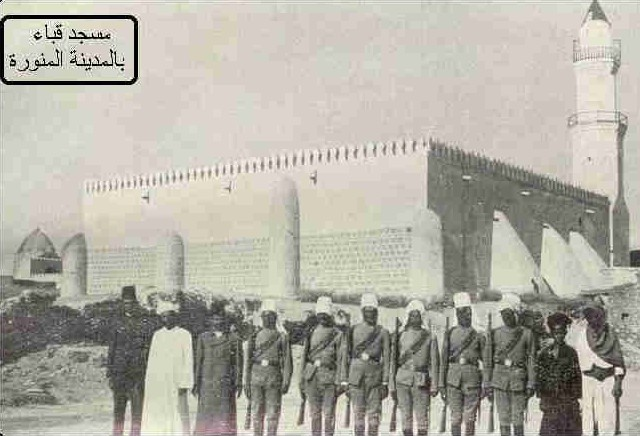
A picture of the mosque prior to 1900

During the Ottoman era, Sultan Suleiman sponsored the reconstruction of the minaret and the mosque's ceiling in 1543. Sultan Mustafa II renovated these same elements again in 1699. Major renovations and modifications took place in 1829 and in the following decade or so during the reigns of Mahmud II (r. 1808–1839) and Abdülmecid I (r. 1839–1861).

=== Modern reconstruction ===
==== King Faisal expansion (1968) ====
In 1968 AD, during the reign of King Faisal bin Abdulaziz, the mosque's exterior walls were refurbished, and the northern portico, facing Medina, was extended to include a dedicated women's entrance. Additionally, the minaret, previously located in the northwestern corner as a standalone structure, was integrated into the main building. This renovation, costing approximately 800,000 Saudi Riyals, resulted in a square-shaped mosque with dimensions of 40 by 40 metres (130 by 130 ft).

==== King Fahd expansion (1984–1986) ====
The present-day mosque is the result of a complete reconstruction that began in 1984 under Saudi king Fahd bin Abdulaziz. It expanded the mosque's size. The Egyptian architect Abdel-Wahed El-Wakil was commissioned to conceive a larger mosque. He initially intended to incorporate the old structure into his design, but it was eventually decided to tear down the old mosque and replace it entirely with the new one. The project aimed to maintain the mosque's traditional Islamic architectural elements while significantly increasing its capacity to accommodate 20,000 worshipers. The reconstructed mosque was built using traditional hollow clay blocks, without formwork concrete.

King Fahd laid the foundation stone for the expansion on November 3, 1984, and the project was completed two years later, with its inauguration on November 2, 1986. This expansion reshaped the mosque from a square to a rectangular layout, featuring a central courtyard accessible from all entrances. A dedicated women's prayer area was established in the northern section, spanning two floors and accommodating approximately 7,000 female worshipers.

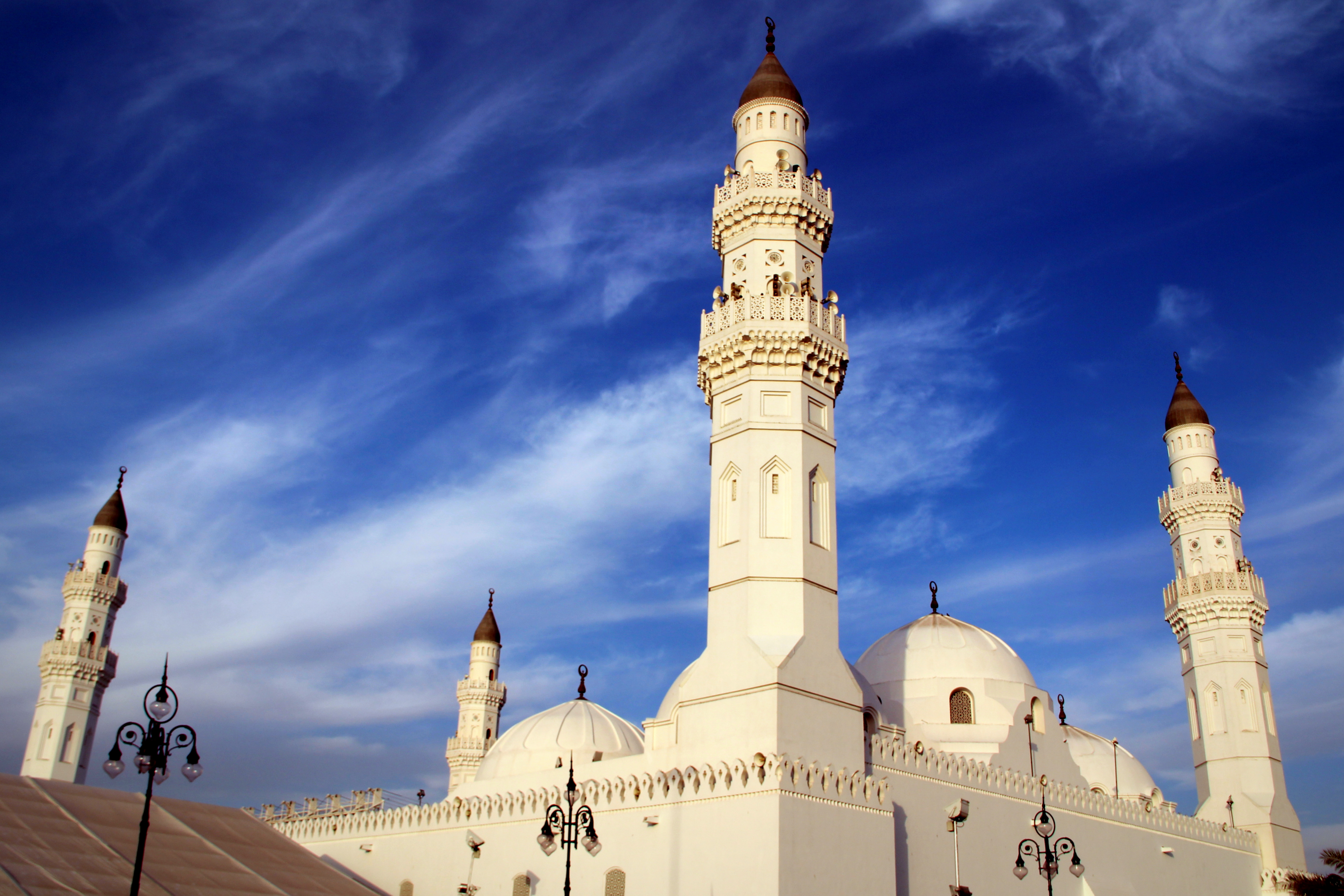
The mosque in 2014

Following this expansion, the mosque featured four minarets and 56 domes. It also included accommodations for Imams and Muezzins, and a library. The mosque's land area measured 13,500 square metres (145,000 sq ft), with the building itself covering 5,860 square metres (63,100 sq ft).

==== King Salman expansion ====
On April 8, 2022, Crown Prince Mohammed bin Salman announced the launch of the largest expansion in the history of the Quba Mosque, along with the development of its surrounding area. The project was named after King Salman bin Abdulaziz. This expansion aims to increase the mosque's total area tenfold, from 5,035 to 50,000 square metres (54,200 to 538,200 sq ft), increasing its capacity to 66,000 worshipers. The project is focused on connecting the existing mosque with covered plazas on all four sides, functionally and visually linked to independent prayer areas not structurally attached to the existing building. When completed, it will also provide all necessary services for the mosque, improve the efficiency of the existing building and its associated services, and enhance the surrounding road network and infrastructure to improve crowd management, accessibility, and the safety and security of worshipers. Additionally, it aims to develop and revitalize several historical sites and landmarks within the mosque and its surrounding areas.

In March 2023, the responsibility for overseeing and operating the Quba Mosque was transferred to the Al Madinah Region Development Authority from the Ministry of Islamic Affairs, Dawah, and Guidance.

== Religious significance ==
Performing Wuḍūʾ ('ablution') in one's home, then offering two Rakaʿāt of Nafl (optional) prayers in the Quba Mosque, is considered to be equal to performing oneʿUmrah. Muhammad used to go there, riding or on foot, every Saturday and offer a two rakaʿāt prayer. He advised others to do the same, saying, "Whoever makes ablutions at home and then goes and prays in the Mosque of Quba, he will have a reward like that of an 'Umrah." This ḥadīth was reported by Ahmad ibn Hanbal, Al-Nasa'i, Ibn Majah and Hakim al-Nishaburi.

=== Mention in the Qur'an ===
The mosque is believed to be the one which the Quran mentions as being founded on piety and devoutness (Masjid al-Taqwa):

There are also those ˹hypocrites˺ who set up a mosque ˹only˺ to cause harm, promote disbelief, divide the believers, and as a base for those who had previously fought against Allah and His Messenger. They will definitely swear, "We intended nothing but good," but Allah bears witness that they are surely liars. Do not ˹O Prophet˺ ever pray in it. Certainly, a mosque founded on righteousness from the first day is more worthy of your prayers. In it are men who love to be purified. And Allah loves those who purify themselves.

— Surah At-Tawbah 9:108

=== Mentions in hadiths ===
The merits of the mosque are mentioned in nineteen Sahih al-Bukhari hadiths; thirteen Sahih Muslim hadiths; two Sunan Abi Dawud hadiths; six Al-Muwatta hadiths.

Muhammad frequented the mosque and prayed there. This is referred to in a number of hadith:

Narrated 'Abdullah bin Dinar: Ibn 'Umar said, "The Prophet used to go to the Mosque of Quba every Saturday (sometimes) walking and (sometimes) riding." 'Abdullah (Ibn 'Umar) used to do the same

— Collected by Muhammad al-Bukhari, Sahih al-Bukhari Volume 2, Book 21, Number 284

Narrated Ibn 'Umar: The Prophet used to go to the Mosque of Quba (sometimes) walking and sometimes riding. Added Nafi Mawla Ibn Umar (in another narration), "He then would offer two Rakat (in the Mosque of Quba)."

— Collected by Muhammad al-Bukhari, Sahih al-Bukhari Volume 2, Book 21, Number 285

== Architecture ==
=== Early form ===
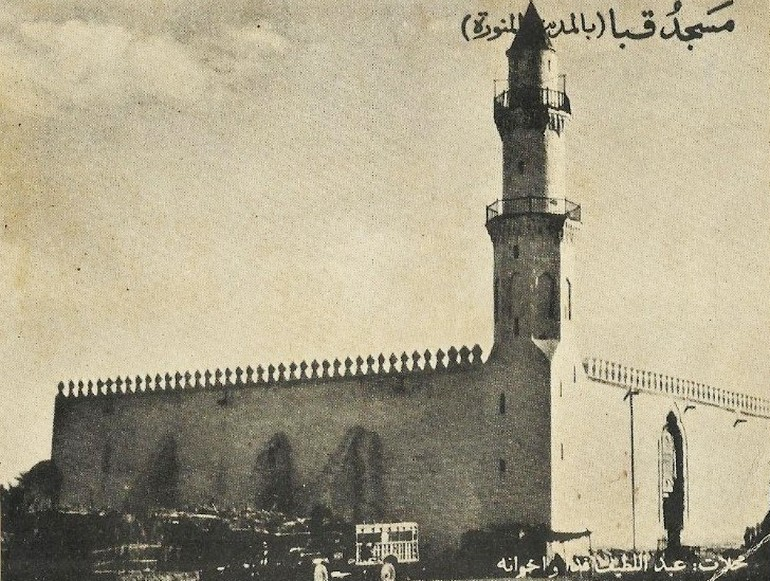
The mosque prior to 1900

The original mosque is said to have been a square or rectangular walled enclosure with an open court inside it. In Muhammad's time, a roofed area supported by columns was added on the qibla side. Other historical descriptions of the mosque mostly date from periods after it had already been expanded by others. For much of its history prior to the 1980s reconstruction, it maintained its generally Umayyad form, with a covered prayer hall and an internal courtyard surrounded by galleries with rows of arches.

The Umayyad structure at the time of Umar ibn Abd al-Aziz's renovations (early 8th century) was made from cut stone and lime, with a ceiling made of valuable timber. It was also decorated with mosaics, probably created with the help of Byzantine craftsmen who also worked on a renovation of the Prophet's Mosque in Medina around the same time. According to descriptions in the Abbasid period, such as those of Ibn Shabba, the mosque measured approximately 32 by 32 metres (105 by 105 ft) and contained an interior courtyard measuring around 24 by 12.5 metres (79 by 41 ft), while Its walls were around 9 metres (30 ft) high and its minaret was roughly 24 metres (79 ft).

The early 19th-century renovations initiated by Mahmud II replaced the originally flat ceiling of the mosque with a new ceiling of shallow domes supported by arches and columns. Prior to its modern reconstruction, the mosque's western entrance was also fronted by a façade with Ottoman tughras (calligraphic signatures) and an inscription recording Mahmud II's works. In the late 19th century, the writer Ibrahim Rifat Pasha reported that the mosque measured some 40 by 40 metres (130 by 130 ft) with a ceiling around 6 metres (20 ft) high.

=== Present-day ===
Front view of the mosque (in 2019)

The new mosque consists of a rectangular prayer hall raised on a second story platform. The prayer hall connects to a cluster containing residential areas, offices, ablution facilities, shops and a library.

The recent new construction of the Quba Mosque that happened in 1984 include many new additions, such as 7 main entrances, 4 parallel minarets, and the 56 mini domes that surround the perimeter of the mosque from an overhead point of view. The courtyard of this mosque is composed of black, red, and white marble, and majority of the structure and interior structures such as the minbar and mihrab are all composed of white marble. Originally, there was one minaret, the new renovations included the addition of the other three minarets, they rest on square bases, have octagonal shafts which take on a circular shape as they reach the top.

The prayer hall is arranged around a central courtyard, characterised by six large domes resting on clustered columns. A portico, which is two bays in depth, borders the courtyard on the east and west, while a one-bayed portico borders it on the north, and separates it from the women's prayer area.

The women's prayer area, which is surrounded by a screen, is divided into two parts as a passageway connects the northern entrance with the courtyard. When Quba Mosque was rebuilt in 1986, the Medina architecture was retained – ribbed white domes, and basalt facing and modest exterior – qualities that recalls Madina's simplicity. The courtyard, is flagged with black, red and white marble. It is screened overhead by day from the scorching heat with shades. Arabesque latticework filters the light of the palm groves outside. Elements of the new building include work by the Egyptian architect Abdel-Wahed El-Wakil, Pakistani architect Hassan Khan Sayyid and the Stuttgart tensile architect Mahmoud Bodo Rasch, a student of Frei Otto.

Sulayman al-Ruhayli, one of the major Saudi Islamic scholars in the present day, is currently one of the Imams that lead salah and teach at the Mosque.

The present-day mosque

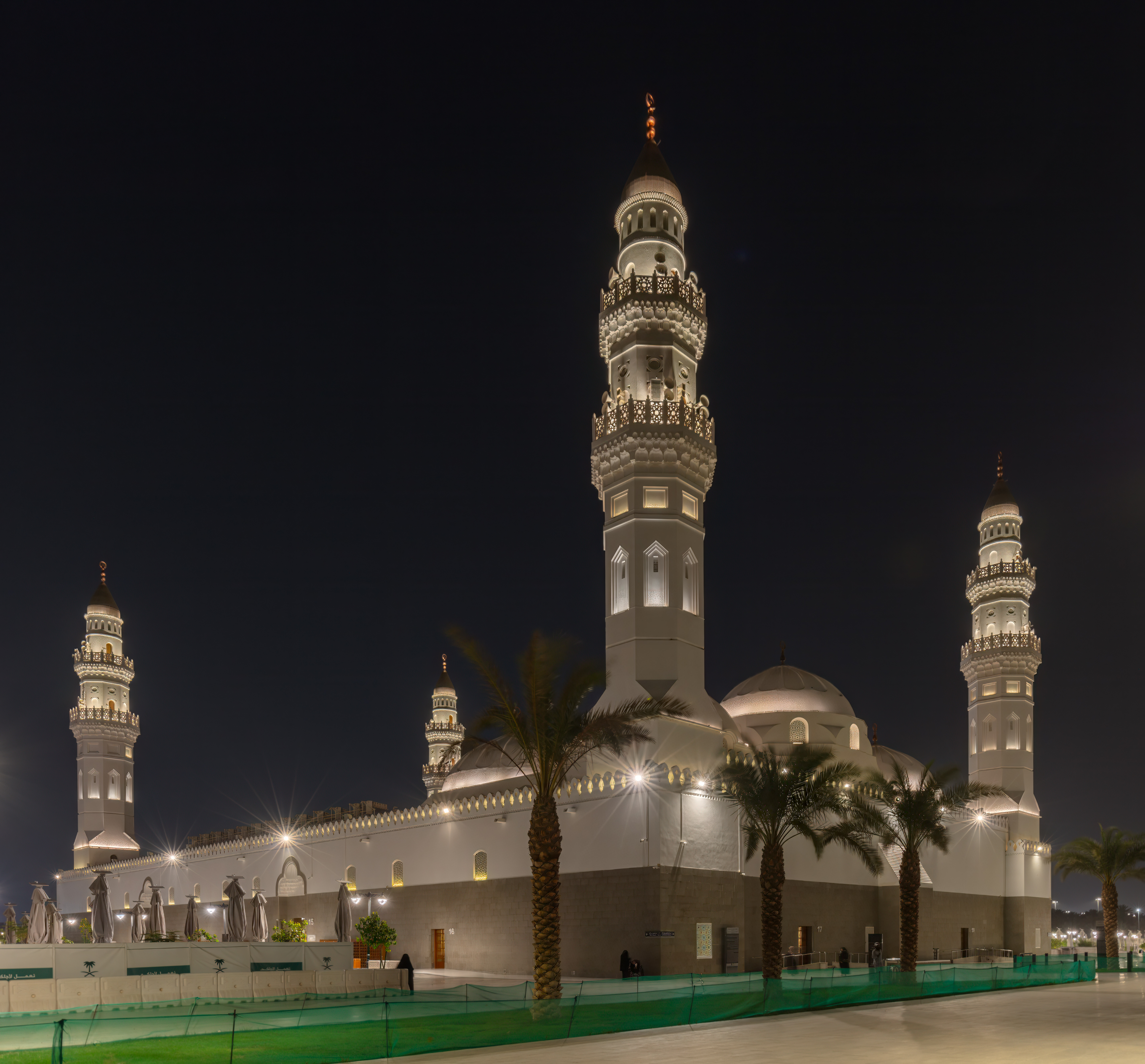
Night view

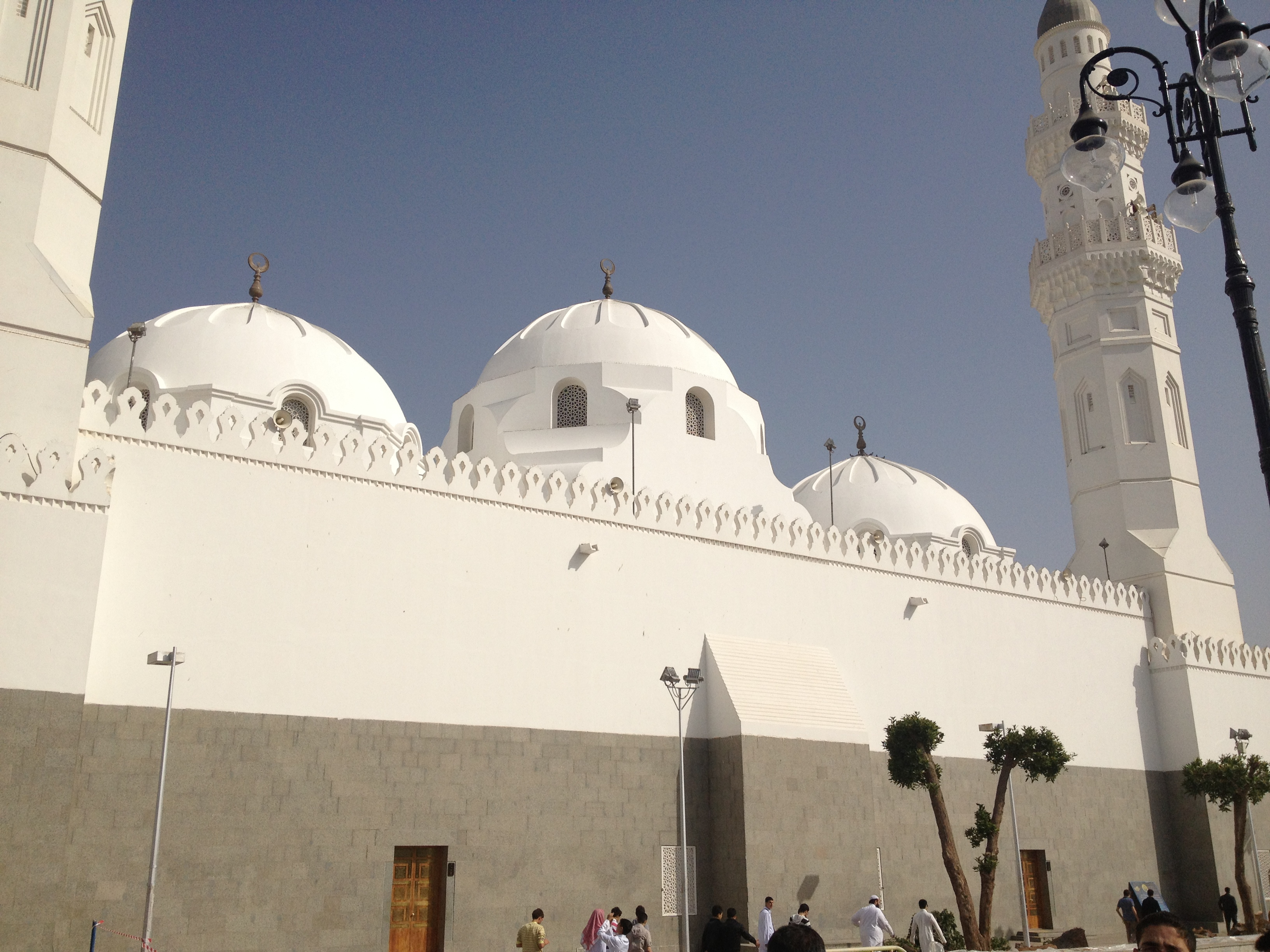
Rear view of the mosque

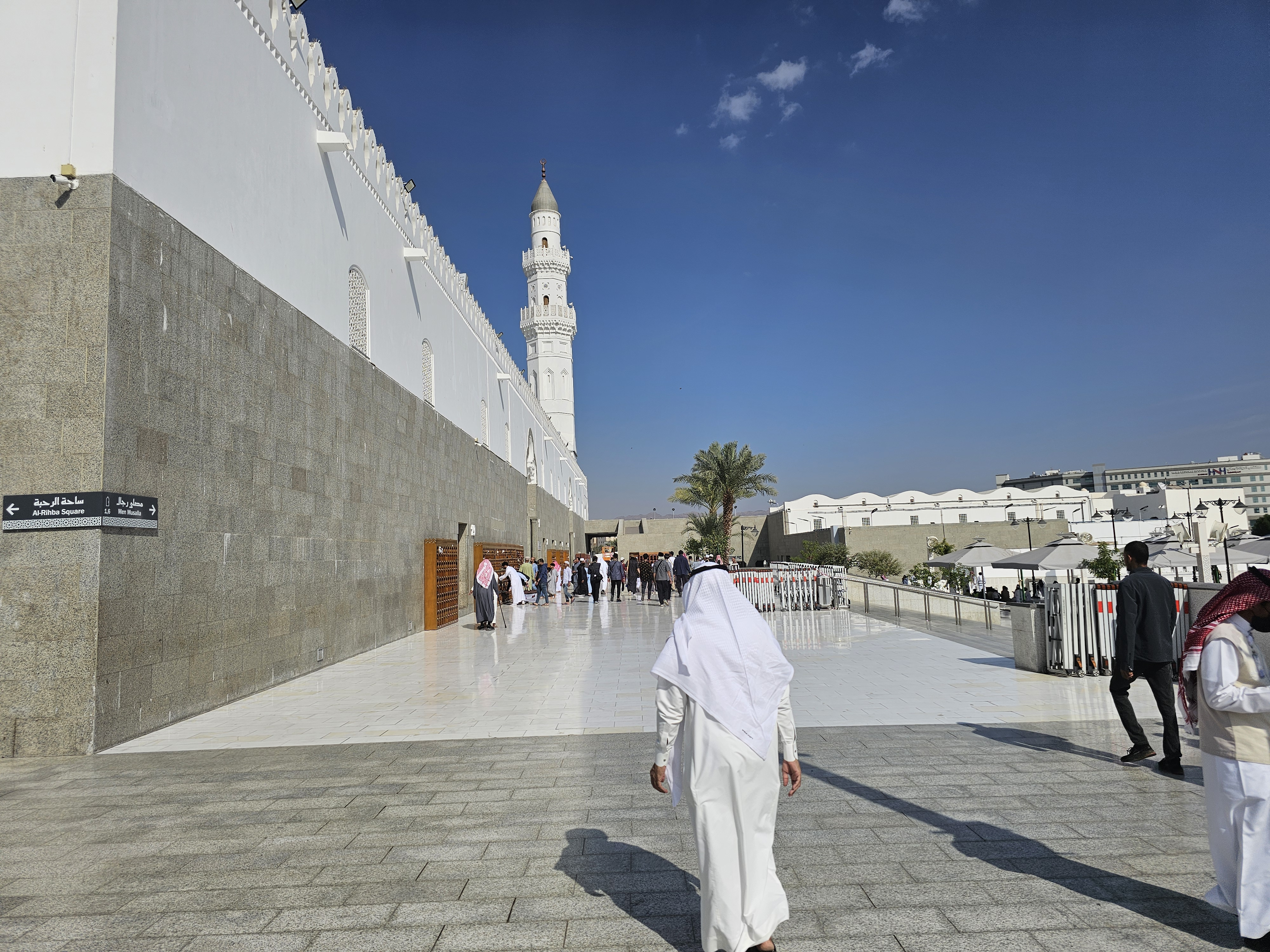
Outside wall walkway

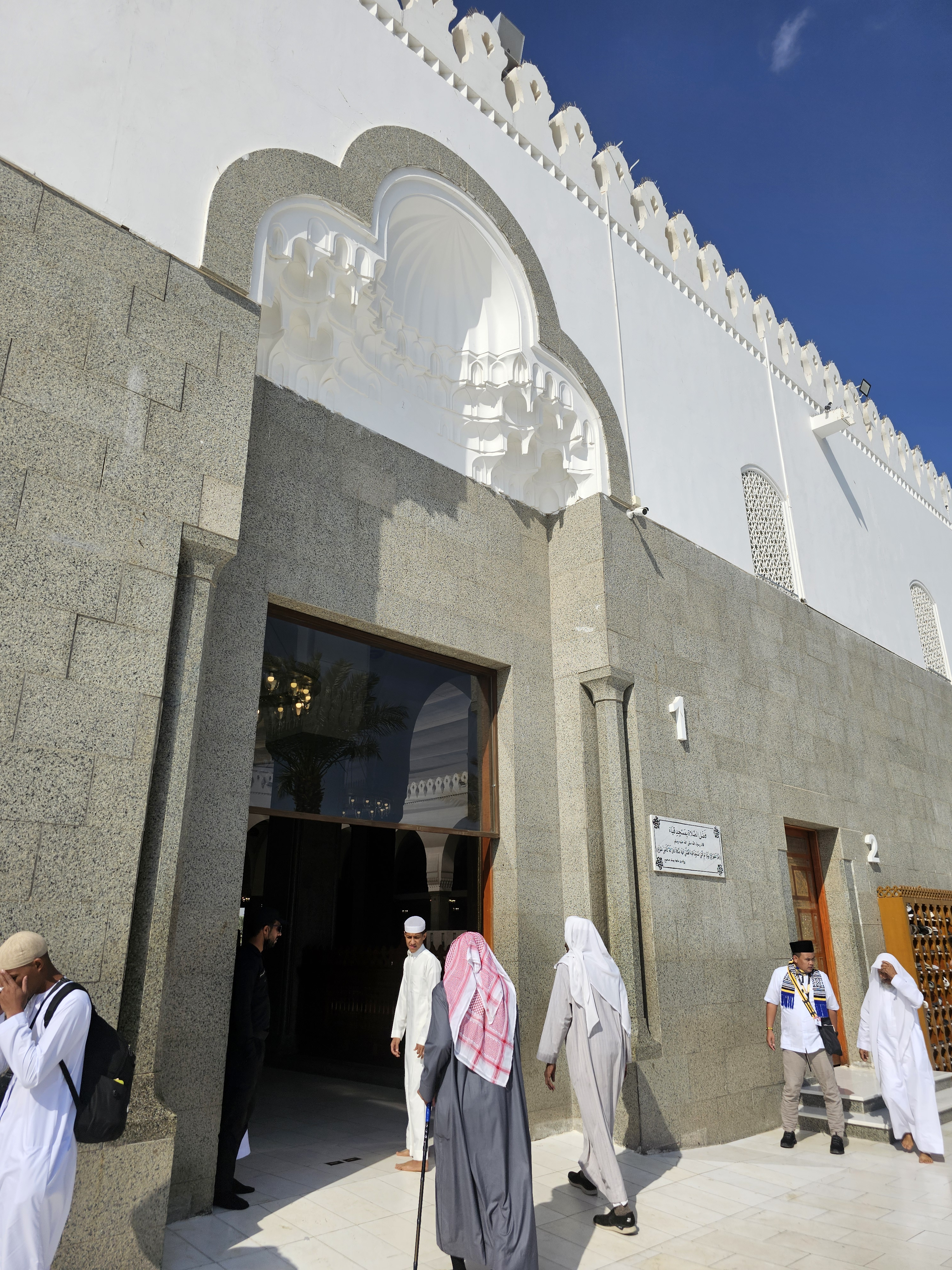
One of the side entrances

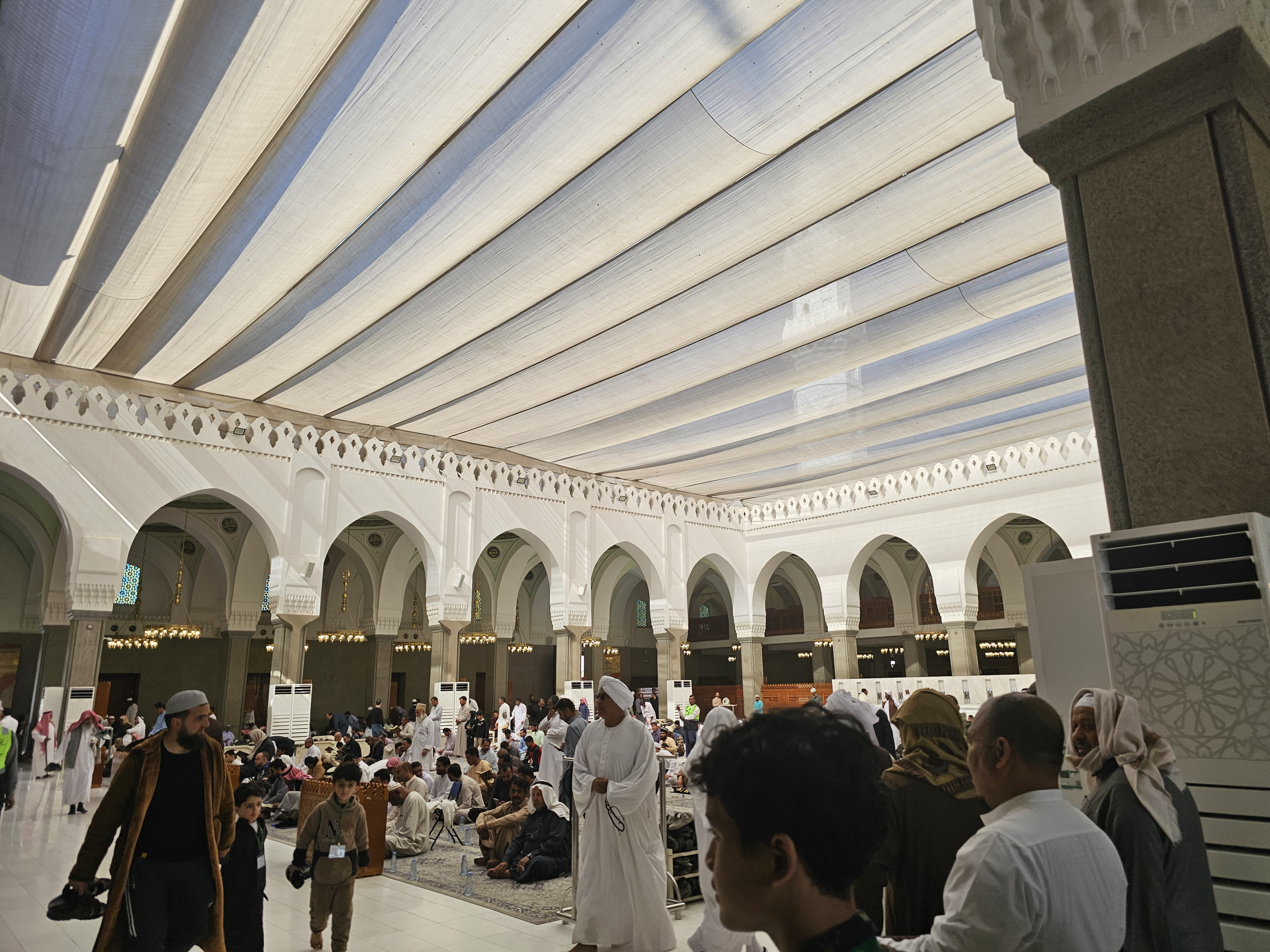
Interior courtyard

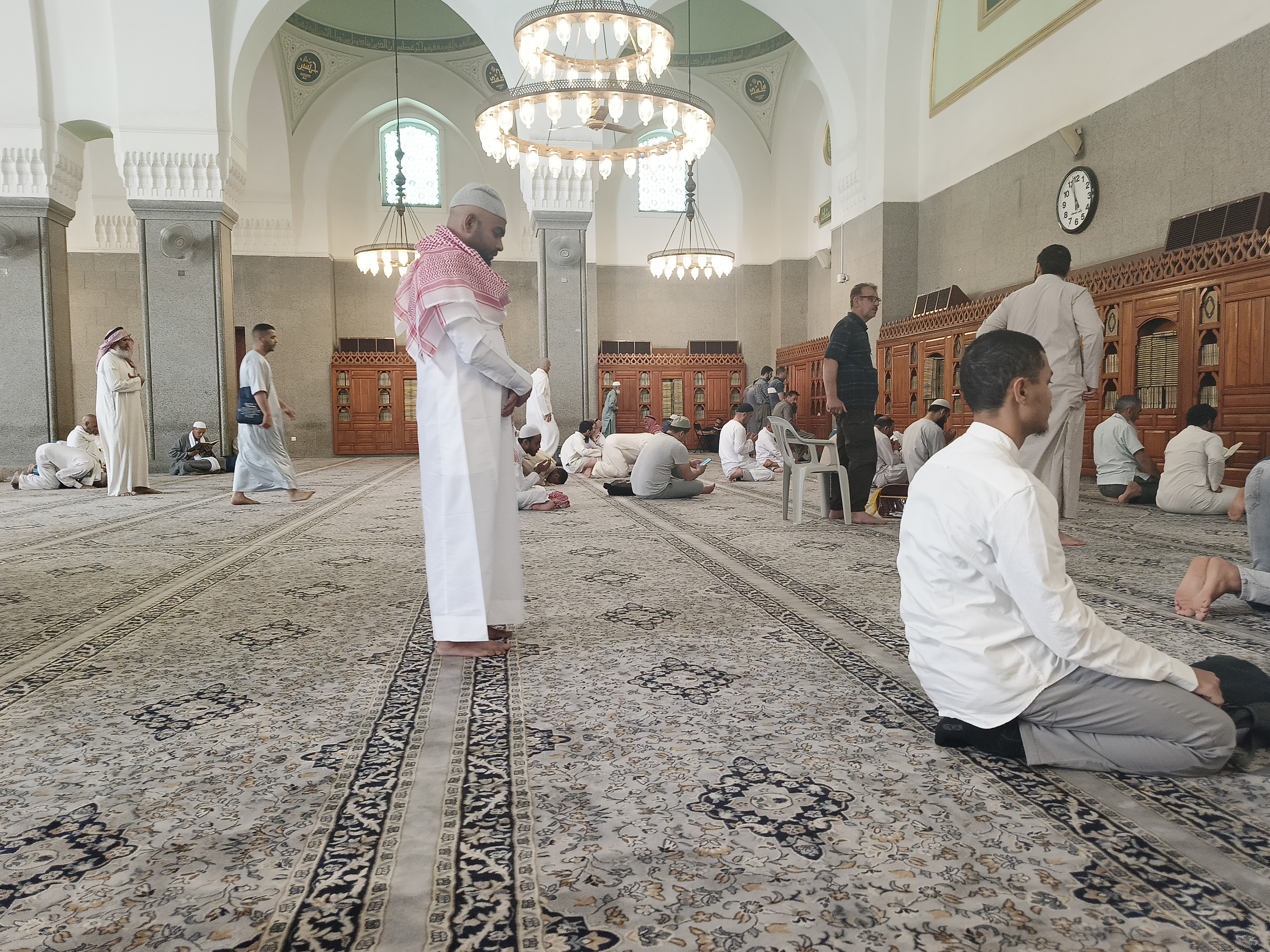
Interior of the prayer hall

The mihrab, with one of the six main domes above

== See also ==
- Demolition of Masjid al-Dirar
- Holiest sites in Islam
- List of mosques in Saudi Arabia
- Masjid as-Sahabah in Massawa, Eritrea
- Timeline of Muslim history
