= Muhammad al-Hasan al-Diddu =

Muslim scholar, author, writer, poet

Muhammad al-Hassān al-Deddew
- محمد الحسن بن الددو الشنقيطي
- Born: 31 October 1963 (age 62); Boutilimit
- Citizenship: Qatar, Turkey, And Mauritania
- Education: Imam Muhammad ibn Saud Islamic University
- Website: dedewnet.com

Muhammad al-Hasan al-Diddu al-Shanqiti (Arabic: محمد الحسن بن الددو الشنقيطي, born 31 October 1963 in Boutilimit) is a Mauritanian Muslim scholar, author, writer, and poet. He is the President of O'lama Information center, and the President of 'Abdallah ibn Yasin University. He is also head of the country's Center for the Development of Scholars. In 2014 he was the Vice President of the International Union of Muslim Scholars, and he is still a member of it.

== Early life and studies ==
He was raised in an academic family. His grandfather was Muhammad 'Ali bin Abd-Alwadud, who was a Muslim scholar and his first tutor. He stayed close to him until his death in 1982.

He started studying and memorizing the Quran when he was 5 years old with his parents, and finished memorizing the whole Quran before he reached 10 years of age. He studied the Ten qira'at of the Quran with his mother, then he learned the Hadith.

== Hadith studies ==
He has licenses in Hadith from various Islamic scholars in different countries, authorizing him to teach Sahih al-Bukhari, Sahih Muslim, Sunan ibn Majah, Sunan Abu Dawood, Sunan al-Tirmidhi, Al-Sunan al-Sughra, Muwatta Imam Malik and Al-Mustadrak alaa al-Sahihain, and the Musnad Ahmad ibn Hanbal, Sunan al-Darimi, As-Sunan al-Kubra and Sunan al-Daraqutni.

== Bibliography ==
His books include:

1. Addresses to the judges in the Islamic Fiqh. (مخاطبات القضاة فى الفقه الإسلامي).
2. The fundamentals of Islamic brotherhood. (مقومات الأخوة الإسلامية).
3. Hajj scenes and their impact on increasing Faith. (مشاهد الحج وأثرها في زيادة الإيمان).
4. Love of the Prophet, Peace and Blessings Be Upon Him. (محبة النبي صلى الله عليه وسلم).
5. Fiqh al-Khilāf (فقه الخلاف).
6. Fiqh al-Asr (فقه العصر), the title mean "Jurisprudence of the era".
7. Explanation of the pages of Imam al-Haramain in the Usūl. ( شرح ورقات إمام الحرمين في الأصول).
8. The Day of Resurrection sights and judgment. (اليوم الآخر مشاهد وحكم ).
9. Shari'a Evidences; Types, features, and symptoms. (الأدلة الشرعية؛ أنواعها وسماتها وعوارضها).
10. Significance ranks in the Usūl, ( مراتب الدلالة في الأصول).
11. Rulings of peace in Fiqh. (أحكام السلم في الفقه).
12. Scatter the testimonies on the papers (نثر الإفادات على متن الورقات).
13. Takfir...its conditions, controls, dangers and pitfalls, (التكفير ..شروطه وضوابطه وأخطاره ومزالقه).

== In Palestine (Gaza) ==
He came to Gaza in December 2012, and gave a speech and spoke on behalf of the scholars of the Islamic nation on the 25th anniversary of the founding of the Islamic Resistance Movement (Hamas). The festival was attended at that time by the movement’s senior leaders and its political leader at that time Khaled Meshaal.

== In Media ==
He has conducted many important interviews on Al Jazeera Arabic TV, al-Resalah Channel, and the Kaaf channel.

== Controversy ==
Muhammad al-Hasan al-Diddu has encouraged Muslims to boycott goods from France, and according to Marianne, he is also known for his “numerous anti-Semitic diatribes” on social networks. He regards the 2015 Charlie Hebdo shooting attacks as well “deserved” "attacks".

== See also ==
- Islam in Mauritania
- Yusuf al-Qaradawi
- Salman al-Ouda
- Mohammed Rateb al-Nabulsi
- Tareq Al-Suwaidan
- Omar Abd al-Kafi
