= Omar Abd al-Kafi =

Egyptian writer

- Cheikh
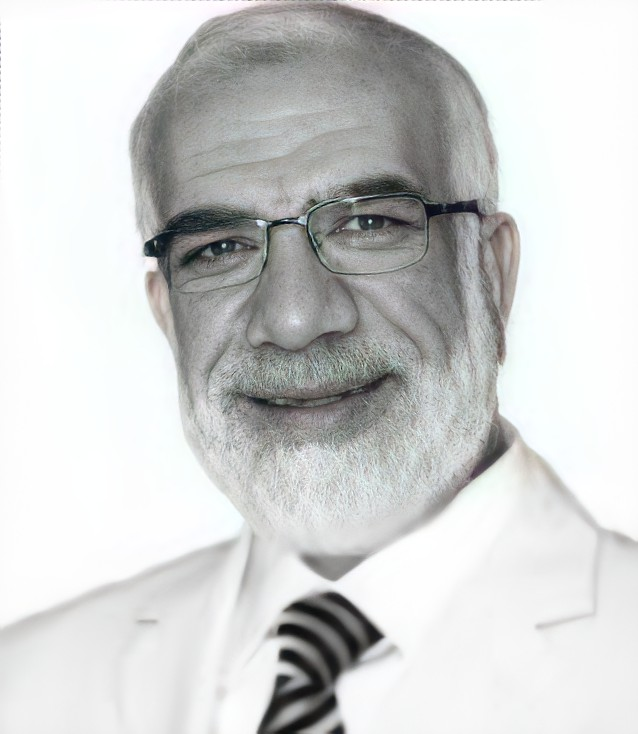
- Born: 1 May 1951 (age 75); Talla, Minya Governorate, Egypt
- Education: Doctoral degree in agricultural science Master's degree in "Comparative Fiqh"
- Occupation: Preacher in islam
- Known for: His books, lectures on TV and his preaches in islam
- Children: 5

Omar Abdul-Kafi (Arabic: عمر عبد الكافي) (born May 1,1951) is an Egyptian writer, who is known for his books, lectures on TV. He has a YouTube channel with over 9.87 million subscribers.

== Books ==
He wrote dozens of books in Arabic, such as:

- The True Promise, (Arabic: الوعد الحق) .
- Hold Your Tongue, (Arabic: أمسك لسانك) .
- Urgent Messages to My Muslim Daughter, (Arabic: رسائل مستعجلة الى ابنتي المسلمة) .
- Sins of the Tongue, (Arabic: آفات اللسان) .
- The Doors of Goodness, (Arabic: أبواب الخير) .
- This Is Our Religion, (Arabic: هذا ديننا) .
- The Ethics of Muslim Man and Woman, (Arabic: خلق المسلم والمسلمة) .
- “The Hereafter” (Arabic: الدار الآخرة)

== On TV ==
He made hundreds of lectures on different TV channels, such as Iqraa TV & Al-Resalah TV.

He had lots of lessons and lectures, for example: “From The Treasures of Sunnah” (in Arabic: كنوز السنة ),

"The Real Promise" (in Arabic: الوعد الحقّ), “The Lucifer Diaries” (in Arabic:مذكرات إبليس), and “Wonders Heart” (in Arabic: عجائب القلوب).

== See also ==
- Mohammed Rateb al-Nabulsi
- Abdul Majeed al-Zindani
- Zaghloul El-Naggar
- Islamic attitudes towards science
- I'jaz In Islam.
- Islam in Egypt
