= Science in Islam =

Science in Islam may refer to:

- Islamic science (the history of science in the Islamic World)
- The relation between Islam and science
