= Nabil Al Awadi =

Kuwaiti writer, humanitarian and television presenter

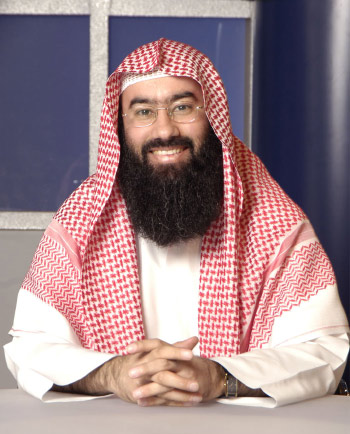
- Born: 7 February 1970 (age 56)
- Occupation: Television presenter
- Years active: 1990s–present
- Known for: his lectures, books, TV

Nabil Al-Awadi (Arabic: نبيل العوضي; born 7 February 1970) is a former Kuwaiti Islamic scholar, humanitarian, television presenter, university professor, journalist and orator.

On 11 April 2025, his citizenship was revoked by the Kuwait government.

== Background and education ==
He had his bachelor's degree in education from the Kuwait University. He traveled to UK to pursue his post-graduate studies and he earned a master's degree in education.

Until February 2013, he was director of the independent Al-Birr Primary School in Birmingham, England.

== Works ==
He made hundreds of series or lectures on different TV channels, such as Iqraa TV, Alrai TV and Al-Resalah.

Part of his TV Series:

- Faithfully Quotes (قبسات ايمانية), on Al-Resalah TV, 2014.
- Best of the stories ( أروع القصص ), on Al-Resalah TV, 2009.
- Honestly Hour ( ساعة صراحة ), on Al Watan TV, & Alrai TV, 2006–2007.
- Honestly ( بكل صراحة ), on Al-Watan TV, 2007 – 2010.
- Stories of the Prophets peace be upon them ( قصص الأنبياء عليهم السلام ), on Al Watan TV, 2007 .
- I knew my way (عرفت طريقي), at 2010 .
- The story of Alfaruk (قصة الفاروق ), on MBC1 TV, 2012.
- Corners (زوايا) on Al Watan TV, 2010 – 2012 .
- Prophetic Biography (السيرة النبوية), on Al Watan TV, 2008.
- Virtues (فضائل), on 2010.
- Scenes "season 1" .
- Scenes "season 2" .
- Scenes "season 3" .
- Scenes "season 4", on Rotana Khalijia.
- Sawâ'Id Al Ikhâa, ( سواعد الإخاء ), on Al-Resalah TV, Iqra, 4Shabab TV .
- Oh Allah, (يا الله), on Almajd TV Network .
- Are they equal? (هل يستويان) . in 2015 .

=== Social media ===
On Twitter he has over 11.1 million followers. And over one million subscribers on YouTube.

== Temporary revocation of citizenship ==
In August 2014, Kuwait revoked his citizenship temporarily for "security reasons", based on article 13 of the Kuwaiti citizenship law. Andrew Gilligan, of the Sunday Telegraph, suggested the revocation was because al-Awadi was a "terror funder". his citizenship was reinstated in 2018.

== Withdrawal of Kuwaiti citizenship 2025 ==
In 11 of April 2025, his Kuwaiti citizenship was revoked by Emiri decree.

== See also ==
- Islam in Kuwait
- Tareq Al-Suwaidan
- Al-Resalah Satellite TV
