= Commission on Scientific Signs in the Quran and Sunnah =

- الهيئة العالمية للإعجاز العلمي في القرآن والسنة
- Formation: 1984
- Founder: Abdul Majeed al-Zindani
- Founded at: Saudi Arabia

The Commission on Scientific Signs in the Quran and Sunnah is an organization established to publicize what it calls "Scientific Signs found in the Quran and Sunna", i.e. references to what it believes are numerous discoveries of science (everything from relativity, quantum mechanics, Big Bang theory, genetics, embryology, to the laser) found in the Quran and Sunnah. It was founded by Sheikh Abdul Majeed al-Zindani with the backing of the Muslim World League in 1984 in Saudi Arabia. The commission is also known as "World Book and Sunnah Association", (Note: As of 21 August 2020, a Google search for "World Book and Sunnah Association" yields "No results", but the facebook page for "the Commission on Scientific Signs in the Quran and Sunnah" includes a "ADDITIONAL CONTACT INFO" link to a website http://www.eajaz.org/ which has an Arabic language page but also redirects to "Electronic Gate for the General Administration of the Book and Sunnah Services". The World Book and Sunnah Association. Archived from the original on 11 August 2021. which does translate into English. and includes among its other departments "Managing the scientific miracles research in the Quran and Sunnah") The International Commission, or World Commission on Scientific Signs of the Qur'an and Sunnah.

Abdullah bin Abdul Aziz Al Muslih replaced Abdul Majeed al-Zindani as general secretary of the commission in 2002-2003. Al-Zindani was one of the spiritual advisors of Osama bin Laden, has been designated a "Specially Designated Global Terrorist" by the US Treasury Department, and is among those belonging to or associated with al-Qaeda, according to the United Nations.

== Foundation, aims and activities ==
According to the "Knowledge Exchange Program", "the Commission on Scientific Signs of the Qur’an and Sunnah" was founded in 1404 AH (1983-4 CE) "in response to a resolution issued by the World Supreme Council of Mosques." Its establishment was "accredited" by the World Supreme Council in 1406 AH (1985-6 CE). In 1423 A.H (2002-2003 CE) a resolution was passed by the "Constitutional Council of the Muslim World League" to "develop" the commission under the name of "The World Commission on Scientific Signs of the Qur’an and Sunnah". Abdullah bin Abdul Aziz Al Muslih replaced Abdul Majeed al-Zindani as general secretary of the commission in 2002-2003, and as of at least 2015 was still at that post. In February 2004, the US Treasury Department designated its founder, Al-Zindani, a "Specially Designated Global Terrorist" (Al-Zindani was one of the spiritual advisors of Osama bin Laden, and is on the UN 1267 Committee's list of individuals belonging to or associated with al-Qaeda.)

The commission describes its mission as "showing, verifying and publishing Scientific Signs" found in the Quran and Sunna, an endeavor that has also been described as attempting to prove that "the Qur'an prophesied the Big Bang theory, space travel and other contemporary scientific breakthroughs," or Bucailleism; an example of seeking scientific foreknowledge in sacred texts.

As of 2006 the commission has organized eight International Conferences on Scientific Signs in the Qur'an and Sunnah. The first, held in Islamabad in 1987, was attended by "200 Muslim delegates from all over the world" and funded "by the Pakistani state to the tune of a couple of million dollars." At the seventh conference in Dubai, "more than 150 scientists and researchers" attended. One of the highlights at the Eighth International Conference in Kuwait was the announcement of a possible cure for AIDS based on "a herbal extract that was prescribed in the Prophetic Sunnah for the treatment of other ailments."

== Controversy ==
A criticism made of the commission is that in its enthusiasm to prove that evidence in favor of Qur'anic scientific miracles “is clear and obvious" and to demonstrate that "a group of eminent non-Muslim scholars in several fields” has testified to this miraculous connection, the commission has spread misleading, out-of-context statements by several of these non-Muslim scholars.

In 1984, a member of the commission, Mustafa Abdul Basit Ahmed, moved to the United States to recruit non-Muslim Western scientists to verify the miraculous signs of the Quran. However, in a 2002 story in the American newspaper The Wall Street Journal, several non-Muslim scientists spoke of questionable practices used by the commission to coax statements from them, such as hard-sell interviews by Sheikh Abdul Majeed al-Zindani, and promises to be “completely neutral” that were not kept.

The commission drew the scientists to its conferences with first-class plane tickets for them and their wives, rooms at the best hotels, $1,000 honoraria, and banquets with Muslim leaders — such as a palace dinner in Islamabad with Pakistani President Mohammed Zia ul-Haq shortly before he was killed in a plane crash. Ahmed also gave at least one scientist a crystal clock.

Marine scientist William W. Hay complained of having fallen into a "trap" in interviews, while embryologist Gerald Goeringer claimed "mutual manipulation" between the scientists and conference organizers. Retired Geologist Professor Alfred Kröner of the University of Mainz has a standard e-mail reply clarifying his "out of context" remarks during one of the conferences and has described the proceedings which resulted in his remarks being used by Muslim apologists.

One product of Abdul Majeed al-Zindani's efforts was a video on "scientific miracles" called "This is Truth", which included clips of Western scientists allegedly expressing their astonishment with the prescience of the Quran on various scientific matters. In 2012, four of the Western scientists featured in "This Is The Truth" -- Alfred Kröner, William W. Hay, Allison (Pete) Palmer, and Tom Armstrong—were featured again in video interviews, this time by the video channel "This Is The Truth Uncut". They told the interviewer ("TheRationalizer") they were misrepresented, their video quotes were taken out of context (often after days of preparation to get them to say words that could be used in the video), and were sometimes quoted in written works saying things they had no recollection whatever of saying.

== Sources ==
- World Book and Sunnah Association (ioqas.org.sa)
- Commission on Scientific Signs in the Quran and Sunnah archived website
