= Zaghloul El-Naggar =

Egyptian geologist and scholar (1933–2025)

- زغلول النجار
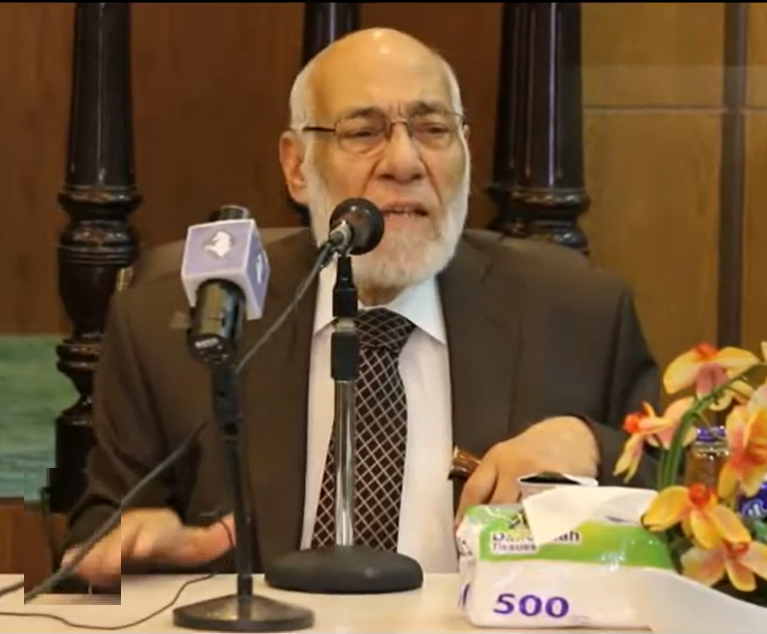
- El-Naggar in 2016
- Born: 17 November 1933; Gharbia, Kingdom of Egypt
- Died: 9 November 2025 (aged 91); Amman, Jordan
- Occupations: Geologist, Chairman, Committee of Scientific Notions in the Glorious Qur'an. Supreme Council of Islamic Affairs, Cairo, Egypt.
- Website: elnaggarzr.com/en

Zaghloul Ragheb Mohammed Al Naggar (Arabic: زغلول النجار, (IPA: [zæɣˈluːl ennɑɡˈɡɑːɾˤ]), 17 November 1933 – 9 November 2025), better known as Zaghloul El-Naggar, was an Egyptian geologist, Islamic scholar and author. The main theme of El-Naggar's books was science in Quran; his philosophy of science is blended with religion. He left his academic career to become the Chairman of Committee of Scientific Notions in the Qur'an, Supreme Council of Islamic Affairs, Cairo, Egypt.

== Background ==
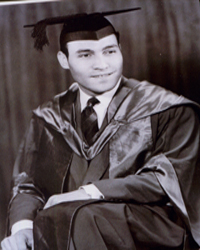
El-Naggar in 1950s

El-Naggar was born on 17 November 1933. He received his bachelor's degree from the University of Cairo. El-Naggar obtained his PhD in geology from the University of Wales in the United Kingdom in 1963 where his thesis title was "Geology and stratigraphic palaeontology of the Esna-Idfu Region, Nile Valley, Egypt, U.A.R.". El-Naggar was an elected Fellow of the Islamic Academy of Sciences (1988), the Geological Society of Egypt and the American Association of Petroleum Geologists, Tulsa, Oklahoma. He was imprisoned because of his political activism and beliefs during his student life. He was considered a grave threat to secular political establishment of Egypt. He was exiled from Egypt in early 1960s and could return to his country only in 1970.

El-Naggar died in Amman, Jordan on 9 November 2025, at the age of 91.

== Works ==
El-Naggar wrote a book entitled The Geological Concept of Mountains in the Qur'an (2003, ISBN 9773630072). It was published by New Vision when El-Naggar was the chair of geology at King Fahd University of Petroleum and Minerals in Dhahran, Saudi Arabia. This book sold fairly well, leading El-Naggar to leave teaching and become the Chairman of Committee of Scientific Notions in the Qur'an.

He published more than 150 scientific studies and articles, none of them peer reviewed, and 45 books in Arabic, English and French. For instance, his book The issue of Scientific Miracles in the Holy Quran (in Arabic:قضية الإعجاز العلمي للقرآن و ضوابط التعامل معها ). Many of those publications deal with what are considered to be scientific miracles in Qur'an.

== Controversial claims and religion ==
El-Naggar said that the power of America would eventually end.

Camel urine was prescribed as a treatment by El-Naggar, which has anti-cancer properties according to a peer-reviewed paper.

He engaged in 9/11 denial.

=== Splitting of the Moon ===
El-Naggar claimed in 2004 that NASA had, in 1978, confirmed in a television program the splitting of the Moon.

== See also ==
- Islamic attitudes towards science
- Quran and miracles
- Abdul Majeed al-Zindani
- Mohammed Rateb al-Nabulsi
