= IEQ =

IEQ may refer to:

- Building science#Indoor environmental quality (IEQ), a measure of air quality
- Integrated Encyclopedia of the Qur'an
