= Integrated Encyclopedia of the Qur'an =

Reference work on the Quran

Integrated Encyclopedia of the Qurʾān
- Editors: Muzaffar Iqbal
- Published: 2013
- Publisher: Center for Islamic Sciences
- ISBN: 978-1-926620-00-8

The Integrated Encyclopedia of the Qurʾān (abbreviated IEQ) is an encyclopedia of the Qur'an. Its General Editor is Muzaffar Iqbal, an Islamic scholar based in Canada. It is published by the Center for Islamic Sciences.

== Background ==
The project started in 2009; the first volume was published in 2013. It was originally conceived as a seven-volume work which would include around 600 entries. The word ‘Integrated’ indicates that the encyclopedia essays all themes, persons, things, places, and events mentioned in the Qur'an.

IEQ was then reconfigured as an open-access online work. The online edition consists of 515 articles which cover all concepts, persons, places, events and things mentioned in the Qurʾān. It is organized alphabetically in English, and its articles are cross-referenced to each other. Major articles begin with the phrase, “This article comprises the following sections”, to make readers aware of the extent of the entry. Each entry has a Bibliography and a "See Also" section for more related entries. The bibliography contains sources that may not be readily accessible or understood by those less familiar with the Qur'an or Arabic.

== Reception ==
The encyclopedia has been mostly well received. Canadian Qur'anic Studies scholar Andrew Rippin called it "sumptuous and carefully produced," "an impressive beginning", and "a considerable contribution to the study of the Qur'an".

== See also ==
- Encyclopaedia of Islam
- Encyclopaedia Iranica
