= Aïchetou Mint Ahmedou =

Mauritanian writer

Aïchetou Mint Ahmedou is a Mauritanian writer, working in French.

Born in Boutilimit, Ahmedou completed her primary and secondary schooling in Nouakchott, where she then studied the sciences. She has written poetry, articles, and stories, many of which have been published locally in Nouakchott, and has produced translations of Arabic-language poetry as well. In the 1990s she began work on a novel, La couleur de vent, which was published in 2014. She has spoken about her work at literary conferences.

== Publications ==
- La couleur du vent : il était une fois à Nouakchott : roman, 2011
