= Moussa Ould Ebnou =

Mauritanian novelist

- موسى ولد ابنو
- Born: 1956 (age 69–70); Boutilimit, Mauritania
- Occupations: Novelist, short story writer
- Writing career
- Language: French, Arabic
- Notable work: Barzakh

Moussa Ould Ebnou (Arabic: موسى ولد ابنو, born 1956) is a professor of philosophy and a novelist from Mauritania.

== Life and career ==
Moussa Ould Ebnou was born in Boutilimit. He received a PhD from the Sorbonne in Paris. In 1984, he became a consultant for the United Nations Sudano-Sahelian Office (UNSO). In 2008, he became a professor of philosophy at the University of Nouakchott. He has also served as an advisor for the Mauritanian government.

He has published two novels in French: L’amour impossible (1990) and Le Barzakh (1994), which were later published in Arabic as الحب المستحيل ("al-Hubb al-Mustahil") (1999), and مدينة الرياح (Madinat al-Riyah) (1996), respectively. He has translated his own work into Arabic.

Ebnou has also published other works in Arabic, including حج الفجار (Hujj al-Fijar) (2003), and الامثال والحكم الشعبية الموريتانية (al-Imthal w'al-Hakm ash-Sha'biya al-Muritaniya).

Barzakh (referred to as The City of Winds) was listed by The National as one of the fifty most important Arabic novels of the twentieth century. The announcement called it "one of the most gripping dystopian tales to come out of the Arab world."

== Works ==
=== In French ===
- The Impossible Love (L’amour impossible, 1990)
  - Arabic translation: الحب المستحيل (al-Hubb al-Mustahil, 1999)
- Barzakh (Le Barzakh, 1994)
  - Arabic translation: مدينة الرياح (Madinat al-Riyah, 1996)
  - English translation: Barzakh: The Land In-Between (2022)

=== In Arabic ===
- The Hajj of Sinners (حج الفجار, Hujj al-Fijar, 2003)
- Popular Mauritanian Proverbs and Sayings (الامثال والحكم الشعبية الموريتانية, al-Imthal w'al-Hakm ash-Sha'biya al-Muritaniya)

== Notes and External Links ==
- UNESCO.org
