= Tareq Al-Suwaidan =

Kuwaiti writer & businessman (born 1953)

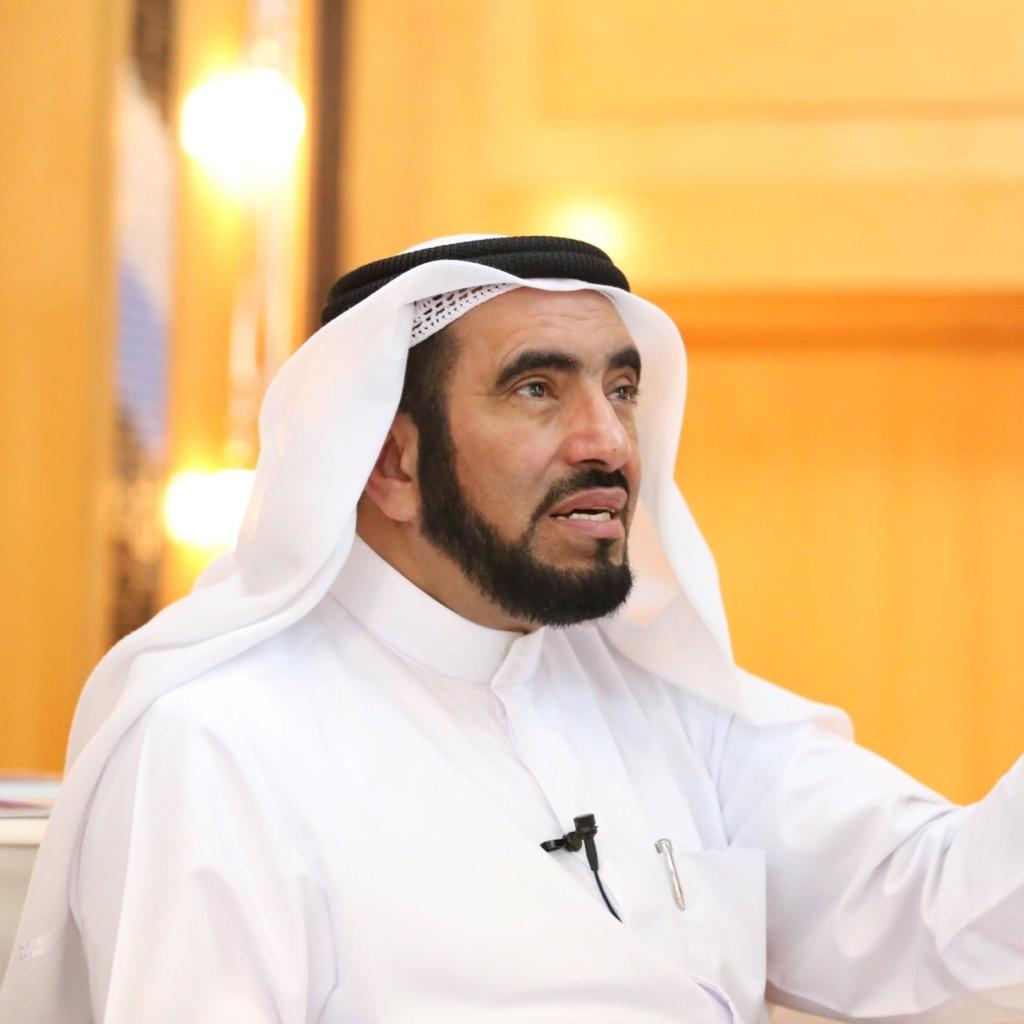
- Born: 15 September 1953 (age 73); Kuwait
- Education: Penn State University; University of Tulsa Petroleum Engineer
- Occupations: Islamic author and speaker, businessman
- Known for: Chairman of Gulf Innovation Group
- Television: General Manager of Al-Resalah TV(2006–2013)
- Children: 6; including Mafaz Al-Suwaidan
- Website: suwaidan.com

Tareq Mohammed Al-Suwaidan (Arabic: طارق محمد السويدان; born September 15, 1953) is a Kuwaiti-born author, motivational speaker, and businessman. He mostly writes about matters related to Islam and has been among the 500 Most Influential Muslims in 2022, 2023 and 2024.

He has written many religious, historical and management books and several of his books were translated into English and French.

== Early life and education ==
Al-Suwaidan was trained in the classical islamic sciences in his youth. He lived and studied in the United States from the age of 17 and remained in the US for 20 years. He graduated from high school, and received a Bachelor of Science in petroleum and natural gas engineering from Penn State University in 1975. He earned a Master of Science and subsequently PhD in 1990 in petroleum engineering from the University of Tulsa.

== Media and management ==
Al-Suwaidan is a TV personality who has prepared and presented numerous Islamic television shows on Islamic subjects ranging from broadcasting of the Quran, stories of Muhammad, notable women and Andalusian history. His shows have aired on Kuwait television, First Channel, Space Channel and MBC.

Al-Suwaidan was formerly the general manager of Al-Resalah Satellite TV, the brainchild of Saudi businessman Prince Al-Waleed bin Talal. In August 2013, Prince Talal fired Suwaidan for his role as the leader of the Muslim Brotherhood in Kuwait. Prince Talal wrote on his Twitter account that he sacked Tarek Al-Suwaidan "for admitting he belongs to the Brotherhood movement." In a letter to Al-Suwaidan, Prince Al Waleed wrote that there was no place for a Muslim Brotherhood member on the channel. Prince Alaweed bin Talal criticized him as having "extremist inclinations".

In 2014, Al-Suwaidan along with Salman al-Ouda got banned by the Saudi authorities to sell their books in the kingdom. Before that he was also barred from Makkah pilgrimage by Saudi Arabia.

== Educational initiatives ==
Al-Suwaidan was one of the founders of the American Creativity Academy in Kuwait, a private institution that offers an American college-preparatory education within the context of Islamic values.

He is also one of the founders of Advanced Generations School (AGS) in Saudi Arabia, a "Canadian school with an Islamic identity." Students study English under the Canadian curriculum, and take Islamic and Arabic classes as well.

He is also the co-founder of the Etqan Global Academy (EGA) school in Qatar, which is an accredited International Baccalaureate (IB) school (PYB), built on a 60 thousand square meters in Al Kheesa area.

== Views and ideology ==
Al-Suwaidan is a strong supporter of women's rights within Islamic sharia law and advocated for reforming traditional understanding of Islam. He has participated in the Doha Debates arguing in favor of women's political and social rights. He said forced marriages are "un-Islamic." During a session with Tim Sebastian at the Doha Debates, he stated that "'Women are equal to men.' This is the basis of Sharia, this is the basis of Islamic law. Now, what happened is that in the past 400 or 500 years, we have been backward, we have been occupied, and tradition has mastered our society and some people are mixing up between Sharia and Islam and the tradition, and thus in the name of Islam, they are putting woman down." Kuwait granted woman the rights in 2005, and he was one of those who were advocating woman rights to those who were blaming Sharia for it. He stated that "I am for the participation of women in building the society and for them taking all positions including the presidency of a country. These are my religious views and I don't hide them."

He supported the Muslim Brotherhood against the 2013 Egyptian coup d'état. He is a member of the Muslim Brotherhood in Kuwait and has been described in US State Department cables as a "moderate Islamist". In 2012 he said "If Islamists start to become tyrants in the countries that were hit by the Arab Spring, we will revolt against them just like we did against their predecessors." and that "Freedom is a holy right and is one of the principles in Islam. ... Freedom is to do and say what a person wishes but in a polite manner and without hurting others." Al-Suwaidan has condemned the 9/11 terrorists saying "these people are very dangerous to themselves, to the Arab world, to the Islamic world itself, and to Islam itself." He said that slavery in Islam was eradicated by liberals only and not by the Islamists, and that "a human being is free in his movements and where he wants to belong, and convictions are what move people, and not force."

In 2006, Al-Suwaidan said that the European Union, as well as the rest of the world, should enact "a law that forbids the insult to religious figures and religious sacred opinions." Al-Suwaidan is one of the signatories of A Common Word Between Us and You, an open letter by Islamic scholars to Christian leaders, calling for peace and understanding.

Al-Suwaidan has also been a harsh critic of the US and the West and at conference of the Islamic Circle of North America in 2000, Al-Suwaidan said: "We must tell the West that we are extending a hand of peace now, but it will not be so for long." "Even if a civilization is ready to crumble – like the West, with all the characteristics of deterioration of past fallen empires – it will not fall until we, the Muslims, strive to give it that last push, the last straw that will break the camel's back." At a meeting of the Islamic Association of Palestine in Chicago in 2000 Al-Suwiadan said "Palestine will not be liberated but through Jihad. Nothing can be achieved without sacrificing blood. The Jews will meet their end at our hands." He was subsequently banned from the US. In May 2007, Al-Suwaidan was listed by U.S. federal prosecutors, along with a group of U.S. Muslim Brotherhood members, as an unindicted co-conspirator in the terrorism financing case against the Holy Land Foundation for Relief and Development which was convicted along with its leaders of financing Hamas. A Federal court subsequently ruled that the list of unindicted co-conspirators should not have been released to the public.

In an April 2012 interview for Al-Quds, a TV station affiliated with Hamas, he said that since politicians were controlled by money and the media which are controlled by the Jews, only "armed resistance" and not Western aid or Western popular sympathy could change the situation in Palestine and Jerusalem. He also said in the interview that the most dangerous thing facing Muslims is the Jews calling them "the greatest enemy." In the reply of accusation of being antisemitic he stated, "I will refuse oppression I will refuse injustice. Whether it's done to a Muslim or done to a Jew, I will refuse injustice," and that "I am against the oppression that is being done to the Palestinian people in Palestine." He also stated that "it is very clear in Islam that we are not anti-Jewish. The Prophet Peace be Upon Him (PBUH) married a girl who was Jewish. ... So we are not against the religion itself, we are not against the people itself." He also stated that "when we speak in Arabic and we say Jews, it is very well understood among Arab people that we do not mean the religion and we do not mean the people of Israel. We are talking about Zionism. As much as when I say the West. Now Australia is in the East, but we include Australia when we say the West. So we have these words that are common. So none of our words mean anti-Jewish or anti the Children of Israel as a nation." He said that the comments were based on a report by MEMRI which he called a "Zionist organization".

In November 2012 a Dubai Police Lieutenant General Dhahi Khalfan Tamim said that suspects arrested in UAE had met with Kuwaiti Muslim Brotherhood members, such as Tareq Al-Suwaidan.

In a sermon to Hamas which was later posted on the internet on 14 July 2014, Al-Suwaidan said Israel was "a deviant country...[that] is destined to be eradicated in its entirety," also saying that "We do not demand a ceasefire. Rather, we demand that the rockets continue to be launched until they bow before us." Al-Suwaidan further stated that "all the mothers of the Islamic nation – not only Palestinian mothers – should suckle their babies on the hatred of the sons of Zion. We hate them. They are our enemies. We should instill this in the souls of our children, until a new generation arises and wipes them off the face of the earth...Each and every one of us, when leaving this hall, should be contemplating a plan how to wipe out Israel."

In October 2013, Al-Suwaidan tweeted that he had been barred from performing the lesser Umrah pilgrimage in Saudi Arabia, stating "I have been banned from entering Saudi Arabia solely for my views and my position against the coup in Egypt and I say that my love for Saudi Arabia and its people is unshaken and that ideas can [never] be banned."

In November 2014, Al-Suwaidan was banned by the Belgium government from attending a Muslim Fair in Brussels on the basis of the comments made in this sermon. On his Twitter account, Al-Suwaidan wrote, "Under pressure from the Zionist Lobby, the Belgium government decided to prevent me from entering the country despite holding a valid visa." He says that the reason they denied him entry was his "candid position regarding Zionism and the barbaric crimes of the Israeli occupation". The Belgium government said that it had decided to prevent Al-Suwaidan from visiting Brussels, because of his "anti-Semitic" remarks in the past. The Belgian Prime Minister and Interior Minister said "This preacher has unacceptable anti-Semitic beliefs and his presence here is a threat to public order." After his ban in Belgium, he stated "I am glad that I disturbed the Zionists to this extent, and I call on everyone, especially scholars and preachers, to raise their voice against Zionism and the barbaric criminal practices of Israel."

In January 2022, during an interview with Al-Estiklal, he stated that "This is the Islamic philosophy; it did not erase the cultures of others. It is this diversity that makes life beautiful. This diversity is what is required, so there is no problem during the integration process to adopt the secondary features of identity, but with retaining the core elements. Muslims who live in Europe, especially from the second and third generations, naturally live as Europeans, but without violating the principles of the Islamic religion" and that "we want every society to have its own unique features, and we want the people of the society to be imbued with this particularity, as long as it does not conflict with the principles of their religion."

Al-Suwaidan used his Twitter account to promote what he calls electronic Jihad. On 17 January 2012, Al Suwaidan tweeted: "I see the need in uniting the efforts of the hackers within the electronic jihad project against the Zionist enemy, and it is an effective and important jihad, and its reward is great – Allah willing." Al-Suwaidan: "I Strongly Encourage Young People To Undertake Electronic Jihad. ... I View This As Better Than 20 Jihad Operations."

In a 4 June 2011 interview on AlQuds TV, Al-Suwaidan said: "The other day, I was asking myself: Why shouldn't I personally go on jihad? First of all, my body cannot tolerate it. Secondly, is what I am doing any less important than jihad? I would like us all to feel that we are in the same trench. There is such a thing as media jihad, political jihad, and a form of jihad that I strongly encourage young people to undertake – electronic jihad. Some of our youth are extremely clever. I hope that a group of hackers will get together, and will wage resistance over the Internet, targeting Israeli and Zionist sites and destroying them electronically."

== Withdrawal of Kuwaiti citizenship ==
In December 2025, media outlets reported that a Kuwaiti Emiri decree had been issued to withdraw the citizenship of Islamic preacher Tariq Al-Suwaidan.

== Publications ==
Al-Suwaidan is the author of 54 books and spoken word audio tape albums.

1. Imam Ahmad Ibn-Hanbal, 2006
2. Secrets of Hajj and Umrah, 2007
3. The Jews: The Illustrated Encyclopedia, 2009 (Note: The aim of this online book is to "attest to, through evidence and accounts, that the falsified religion of the Jews, itself, encourages them to practice treason and treachery, and feeds them to make them a special group among humans, and confers upon them the right to exploit others on the most hideous paths of duplicity.")
4. Stories of the Prophets in Al-Quran, 2012
5. Great Women in Islam, Kindle 2013 - ISBN 978-1490309927
6. The Illustrated History Of Islam, Kindle 2013 - ASIN B07ZJ4MVDS
7. Imam Malik, Kindle 2013 - ASIN B07ZHVZZQ2
8. Imam Al-Shafi'i, Kindle 2013 - ASIN B07ZH8LPG9
9. Prophet Muhammad (SAW): The Hallmark of Leadership, 2015
10. Imam Abu Hanifa An-Numan, Kindle 2019 - ASIN B07ZFPTTCJ
11. The School of Life, 2019
12. Revisiting Our Concepts, 2019
13. The Art of Giving, 2019
14. Skills of Influencing
15. Understanding Religion

== See also ==
- Nabil Al Awadi
- Mohammed Rateb al-Nabulsi
- Mohamad al-Arefe
- Islam in Kuwait
- Al-Resalah Satellite TV
