= Boutilimit =

- Commune and town
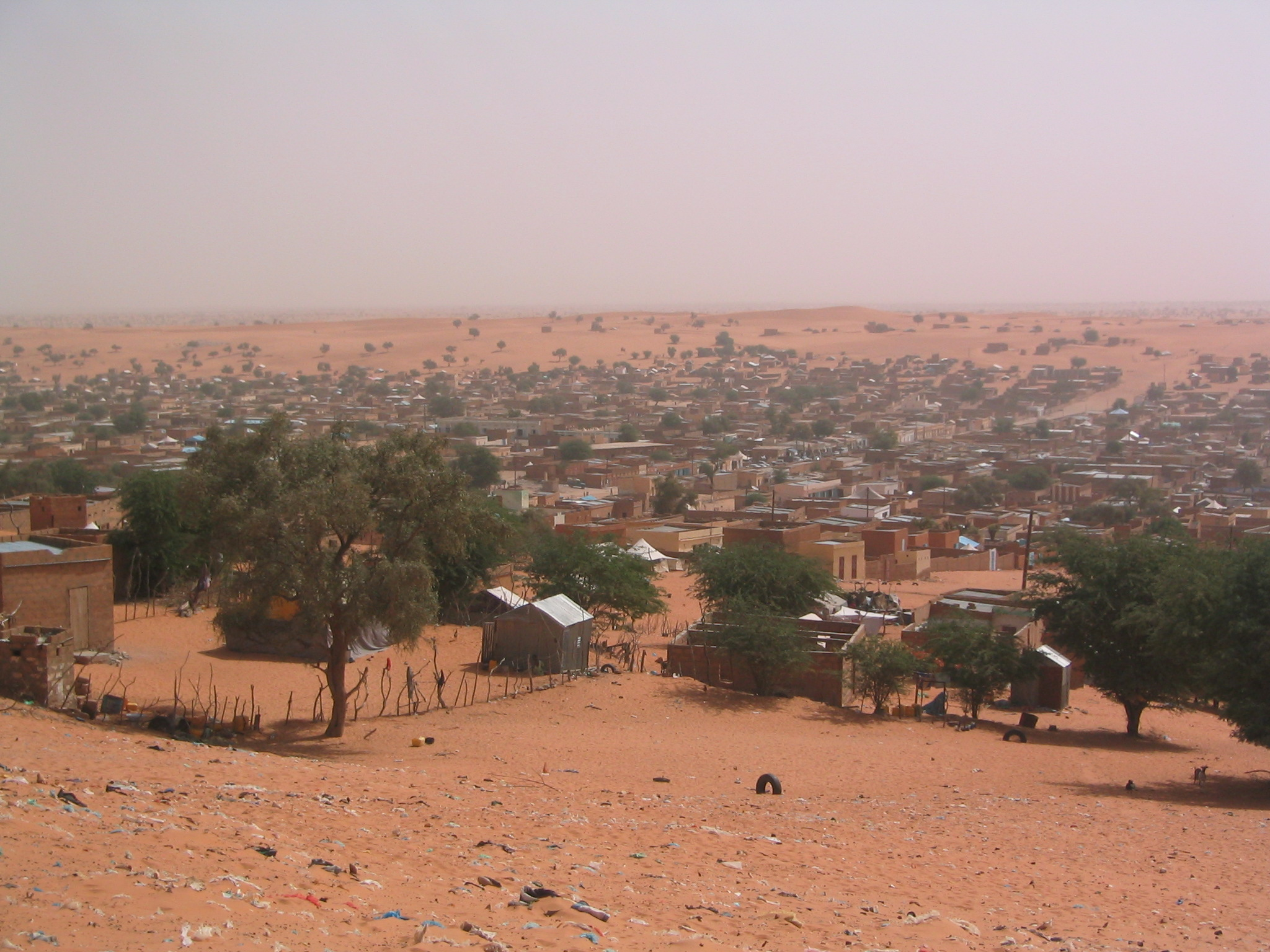

- Location in Mauritania
- Coordinates: 17°31′N 14°46′W
- Country: Mauritania
- Region: Trarza
- Department: Boutilimit (department)

Area
  - Commune and town: 709.2 km^{2} (273.8 sq mi)

Population (2023)
  - Commune and town: 32,347
  - Density: 45.61/km^{2} (118.1/sq mi)
  - Urban: 15,536

Boutilimit (Arabic: بوتلميت) lies 164 km southeast of Mauritania's capital of Nouakchott.

The estimated population in 2013 was 26,926. The estimated population in 2023 was 32,347.

The town is also well known in the region for its production of handicraft items, particularly rugs made from camel or goat hair, as well as silver crafts.

== Notable people ==
Notable people from the town include Moktar Ould Daddah, the nation's first President following independence from France, the writers Aïchetou Mint Ahmedou and Moussa Ould Ebnou, the deputy L’Malouma Said, and the journalist Naha Mint Seyyidi.

Mohammad Al-Hasan Al-Dido, a Mauritanian Muslim scholar, author, writer, and poet, was born in Boutilimit.

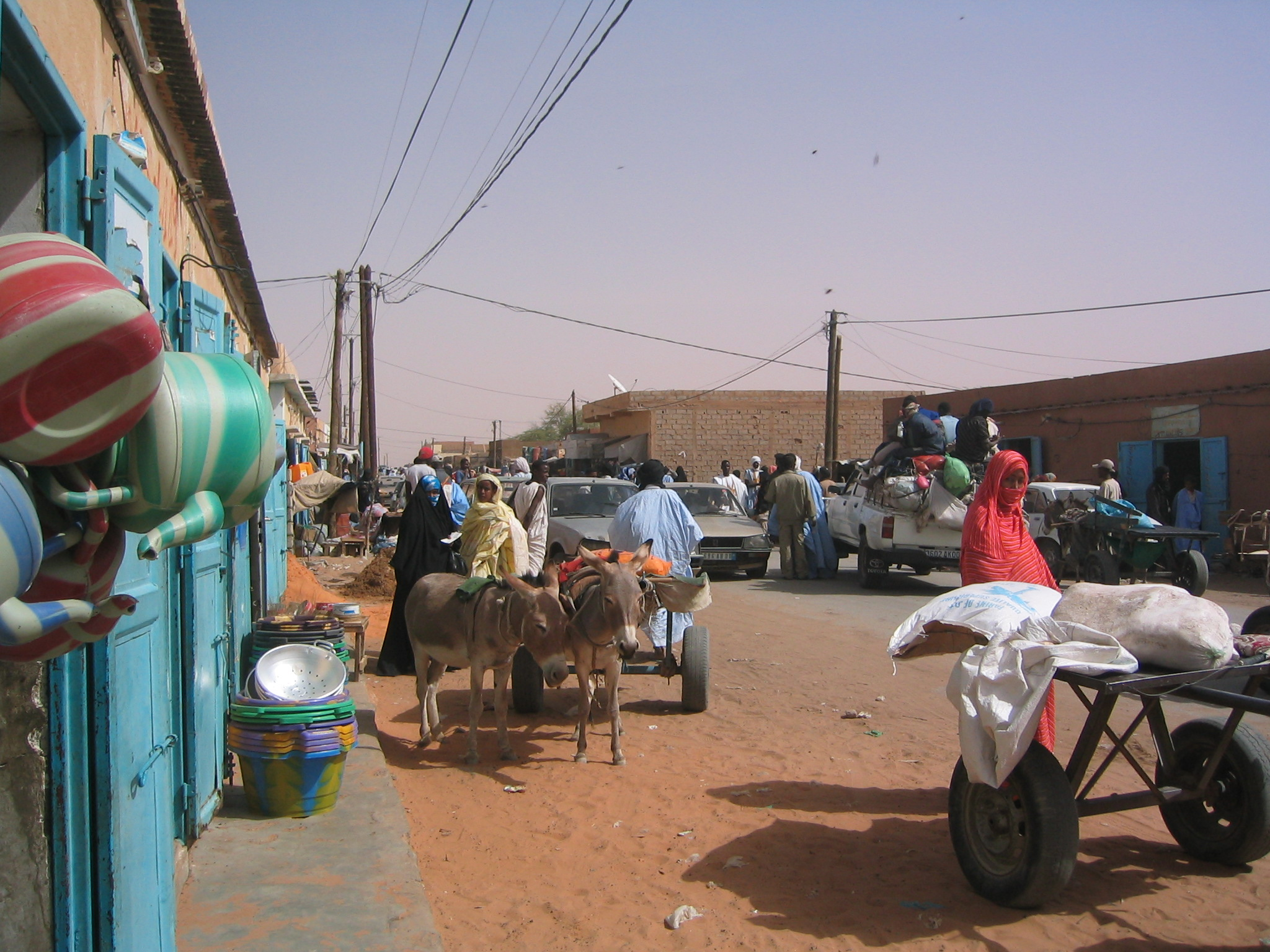
Street scene

== Climate ==
Climate data for Boutilimit
| Month | Jan | Feb | Mar | Apr | May | Jun | Jul | Aug | Sep | Oct | Nov | Dec | Year |
|---|---|---|---|---|---|---|---|---|---|---|---|---|---|
| Mean daily maximum °C (°F) | 29.9 (85.8) | 32.7 (90.9) | 35.7 (96.3) | 37.8 (100.0) | 40.6 (105.1) | 40.7 (105.3) | 37.5 (99.5) | 35.9 (96.6) | 36.6 (97.9) | 37.5 (99.5) | 35.1 (95.2) | 30.1 (86.2) | 35.8 (96.4) |
| Daily mean °C (°F) | 21.8 (71.2) | 25.4 (77.7) | 27.7 (81.9) | 29.7 (85.5) | 33.0 (91.4) | 33.1 (91.6) | 29.9 (85.8) | 30.5 (86.9) | 31.0 (87.8) | 32.2 (90.0) | 26.9 (80.4) | 23.0 (73.4) | 28.7 (83.7) |
| Mean daily minimum °C (°F) | 15.4 (59.7) | 17.0 (62.6) | 18.7 (65.7) | 20.3 (68.5) | 22.8 (73.0) | 24.0 (75.2) | 23.9 (75.0) | 24.0 (75.2) | 24.3 (75.7) | 23.4 (74.1) | 20.4 (68.7) | 16.0 (60.8) | 20.9 (69.6) |
| Average precipitation mm (inches) | 1 (0.0) | 2 (0.1) | 1 (0.0) | 1 (0.0) | 3 (0.1) | 5 (0.2) | 32 (1.3) | 64 (2.5) | 46 (1.8) | 15 (0.6) | 3 (0.1) | 2 (0.1) | 173 (6.8) |
| Average relative humidity (%) | 29 | 28 | 28 | 30 | 34 | 46 | 64 | 70 | 75 | 45 | 34 | 33 | 43 |
| Mean monthly sunshine hours | 269.7 | 259.9 | 310.0 | 324.0 | 325.5 | 300.0 | 303.8 | 279.0 | 264.0 | 266.6 | 267.0 | 251.1 | 3,420.6 |
| Mean daily sunshine hours | 8.7 | 9.2 | 10.0 | 10.8 | 10.5 | 10.0 | 9.8 | 9.0 | 8.8 | 8.6 | 8.9 | 8.1 | 9.4 |
Source: Arab Meteorology Book
