= Mohammed Rateb al-Nabulsi =

Syrian writer (born 1939)

Mohammed Rateb al-Nabulsi Mohammed Rateb Al-Nabulsi
- محمد راتب النابلسي
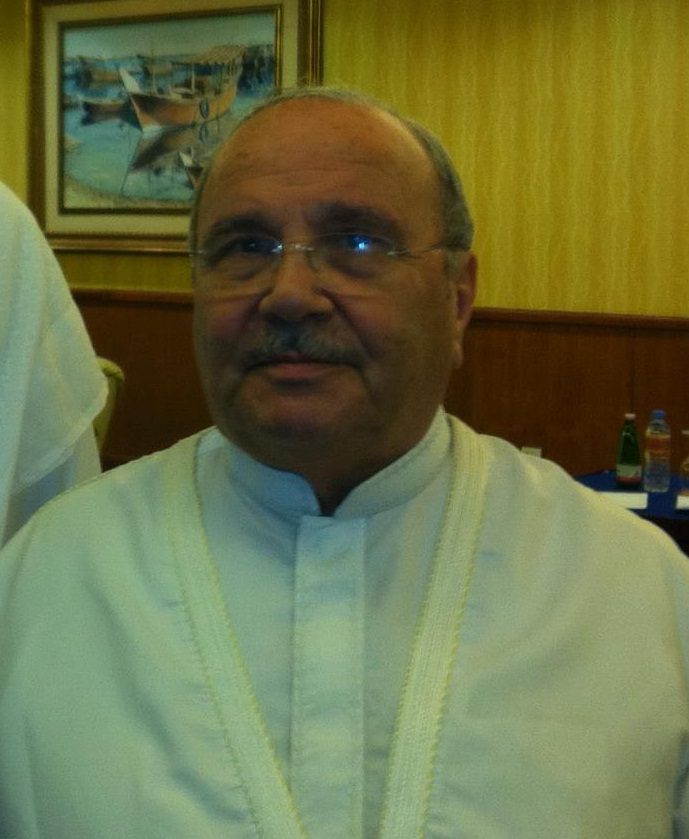
- Born: 26 December 1938 (age 87); Damascus, Syrian Republic
- Education: Master's degree in Arabic arts, University of Lyon. Doctorate degree in education, Trinity College Dublin, 1999
- Known for: His books, I'jaz lectures
- Website: nabulsi.com/en

Mohammed Rateb Al-Nabulsi (Arabic: محمد راتب النابلسي) (January 29, 1939) is a Syrian writer, professor, Islamic scholar, and Co-founder & manager (Nabulsi Encyclopedia of Islamic Science). He was a professor at Damascus University. He was living in Syria but after the Syrian Revolution started in 2011, he went to Jordan. After the fall of the Assad regime he returned to Syria in 2024.

== Education ==
Al Nabulsi was raised in Damascus. After he graduated from high school, he started studying at the faculty of Arts in Damascus University to study Arabic language. He graduated in 1964 with Licentiate degree. In 1966 he got a diploma in Educational qualification. Then he got a master's degree in Arabic arts from University of Lyon and received a Doctorate in education from Trinity College Dublin in 1999.

== Books ==
Al Nabulsi wrote dozens of books, such as:

=== Books translated from Arabic to English ===
- Reviews in Islam, (Arabic: نظرات في الإسلام) .
- Reflections on Islam, (Arabic: تأملات في الإسلام) .
- Bright words and productive meetings with Al Shaarawy, (Arabic: كلمات مضيئة ولقاءات مثمرة مع الشعراوي).
- Encyclopedia of the names of Allah, (Arabic: موسوعة الأسماء الحسنى), in three Books.
- Creed and Quran Miraculousness (in Arabic: العقيدة والإعجاز).
- Constituents of Divine Assignment (in Arabic: مقومات التكليف).
- Ramadan Fatwas (in Arabic: فتاوى رمضان).
- The book of Hajj-Allah is the Greatest- secrets of Hajj (in Arabic: رحلة الحج- الله أكبر- حكم وأسرار).
- Encyclopedia of Scientific I'jaz (inimitability) in Al-Quran and Sunnah (Arabic: موسوعة الإعجاز العلمي في القرآن والسنة), in Two books, which are:
  - The miracles of God in human آيات الله في الإنسان
  - The miracles of God in Universe آيات الله في الآفاق

=== Books in Arabic ===
- Isra and Miraj, (Arabic: الإسراء والمعراج) .
- The Hijra, (Arabic: الهجرة) .
- God is the Greatest, (Arabic: الله أكبر) .

== On TV ==
Al Nabulsi has numerous lectures on different TV channels, such as Iqraa TV, Syria TV, Cham TV, Addounia TV, Al-Resalah TV, Infinity TV, Future TV

Al Nabulsi had lots of lectures and series on TV channels, for example: “Anouar Al Quran (the Quran lights)” series, and “Ala Al-Houda (On the right guidance)”.

== See also ==
- Islam in Syria.
- Qur'an and science
- Qur'an miracles
- Abdul Majeed al-Zindani
- Zaghloul El-Naggar
- I'jaz In Islam.
