= Naha Mint Seyyidi =

Mauritanian journalist (died 2021)

- Born: Boutilimit
- Died: 2021
- Citizenship: Mauritania
- Occupation: Journalist
- Awards: Life time achievement award

Naha Mint Mohamed Lemine Ould Seyyidi (c. 20th century – July 24, 2021) was a Mauritanian journalist. She was considered the first woman to work in media in Mauritania.

== Biography ==
Seyyidi was born in Boutilimit, Mauritania. She was an autodidact, having no formal higher education.

She was considered a pioneer among women journalists in Mauritania and among Arab women journalists in the region as a whole. When the country's national radio broadcaster was launched as the country gained independence around 1960, she became the first woman to work for the station. She later became the first woman to host a television news show in the country.

Her younger sister, Khadaja, was also an early female journalist in the country. The sisters both worked for the French-language broadcaster Journal Télévisé en Français, though Seyyidi also broadcast in Arabic. As a broadcaster, she was an influential voice during Mauritania's post-independence political turbulence.

She was a member of Mauritania's Higher Council of Women beginning in the 1960s. She was also the honorary president of the Mauritanian Union of Women in Media. In 2020, the organization launched the Naha Mint Seyyidi Competition for Women's Issues in Media.

Seyyedi died in Mauritania in 2021.

== Awards and honors ==
Seyyidi was honored in 1967 by Egyptian President Gamal Abdel Nasser, Tunisian President Habib Bourguiba, and President of the United Arab Emirates Zayed bin Sultan Al Nahyan. In 1977, during ceremonies celebrating Mauritania's independence, the first Mauritanian President Moktar Ould Daddah honored her with the Independence Medal.

In 2002, she received a lifetime achievement award from the Mauritanian government.
