= Alfred Kröner =

German geologist (1939–2019)

Alfred Kröner (8 September 1939 – 22 May 2019) was a German Professor of Geology at Johannes Gutenberg University of Mainz in Mainz, Germany. He specialized in the Precambrian geology of Africa and geology of China but worked on many other geologic problems around the world. His research focused on the tectonics of the continental crust, geochronology, geochemistry, palaeomagnetism, structural geology, and petrology. He was especially interested in the Precambrian and Palaeozoic evolution of the continental crust.

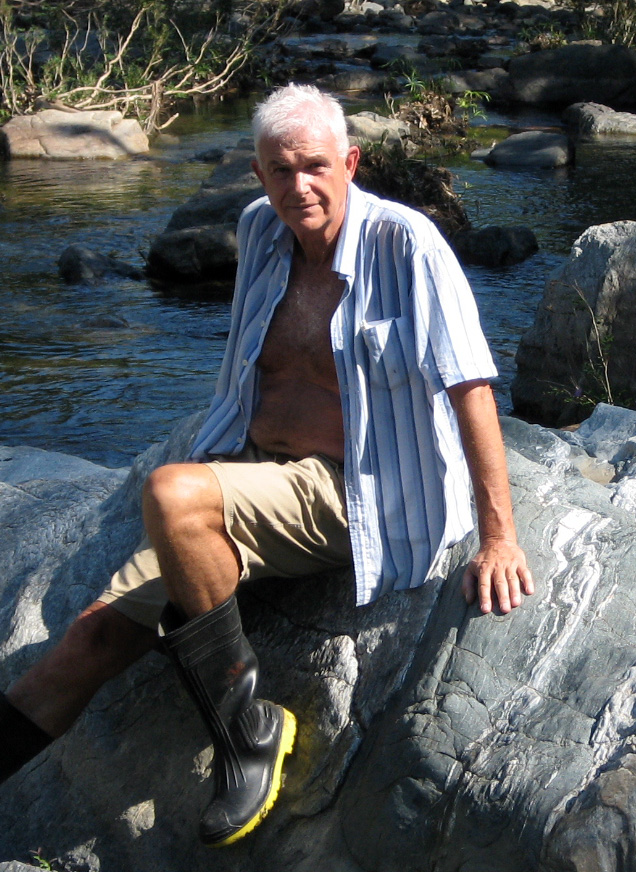
Kroner on the Mabujina Complex, Cuba, 2007

== Career ==
Kröner was born in Kassel. He studied geology at the Technical University in Clausthal-Zellerfeld, Germany, the University of Vienna, Austria, and the Technical University in Munich, Germany, graduating with a Diploma (M.Sc.) in 1965. After 18 months of military service in Germany he continued his studies as a Ph.D. student in the Precambrian Research Unit, University of Cape Town, South Africa, beginning in 1966; he obtained his Ph.D. degree in 1968. After 6 months as exploration geologist in Namibia he returned to Cape Town as a Senior Research Fellow of the Precambrian Research Unit, undertaking research projects in Namaqualand and Namibia and supervising research students. From 1974 to 1976 He was Acting Director of the Precambrian Research Unit at the University of Cape Town. In 1977 he moved back to Germany to take over the Chair of General and Regional Geology at the University of Mainz. He was a visiting scientist at Stanford University, USA, the Australian National University in Canberra, Curtin University of Technology and the University of Western Australia, both in Perth. After his retirement from U. Mainz, he accepted an invitation to start a long-term relationship with the SHRIMP Centre of the Chinese Academy of Geological Sciences (CAGS) in Beijing, where he spent six months every year. From 2008 until 2019 he was Visiting Research Professor at the Beijing SHRIMP Centre. From there, he was able to travel the world to study Precambrian rocks and then bring these samples back to CAGS, where he was able to obtain robust U-Pb zircon ages. He was a member of numerous professional societies, a Fellow of the Geological Society of America and an Honorary Professor of Northwestern University, Xi'an, China. He was co-editor of the journals Precambrian Research (Elsevier) and Terra Nova (Blackwells).

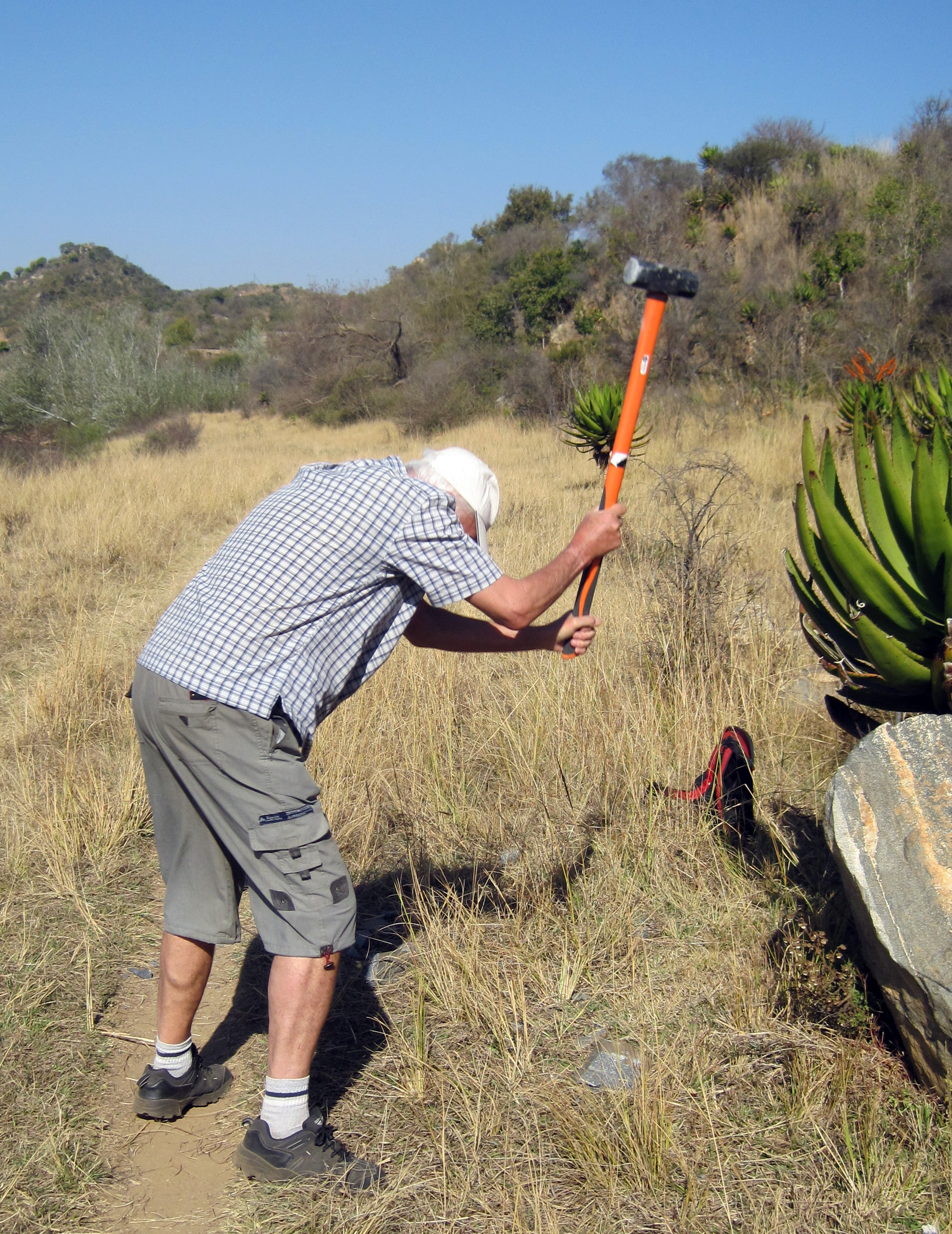
Kröner, age 74, in action in 2013, taking a sample along the Ngwimpisi river in Swaziland

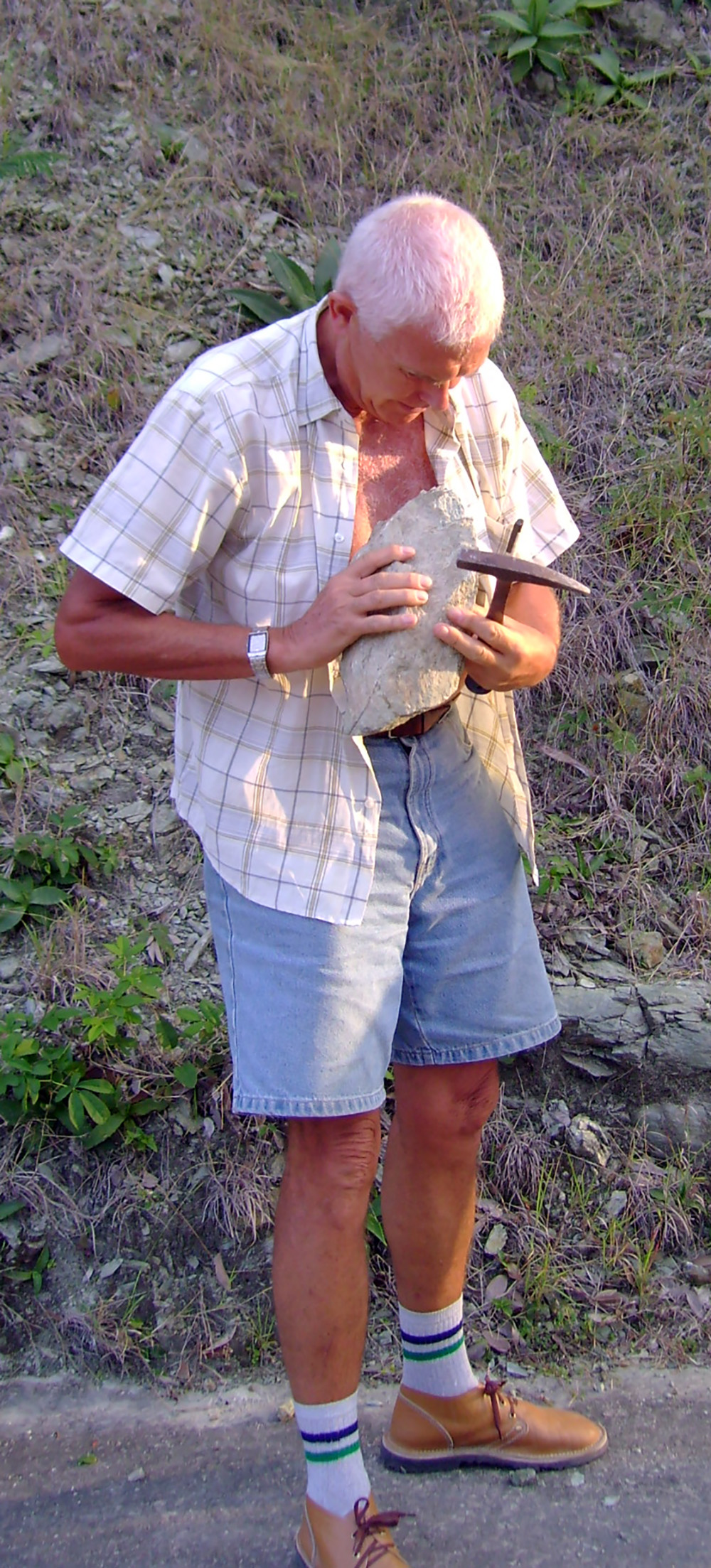
Kröner in eastern Cuba (Purial Massif) in 2007

The American Journal of Science, published by Yale University, in dedicating a special issue to him on his 60th birthday, said that it was

celebrated with a symposium in Mainz. It was here at the Johannes Gutenberg-University that Alfred was appointed full Professor of Geology in 1977. After this, he expanded his activities over several continents as a truly cosmopolitan geoscientist of overwhelming efficiency, recognized and appreciated worldwide in the Geoscience community.

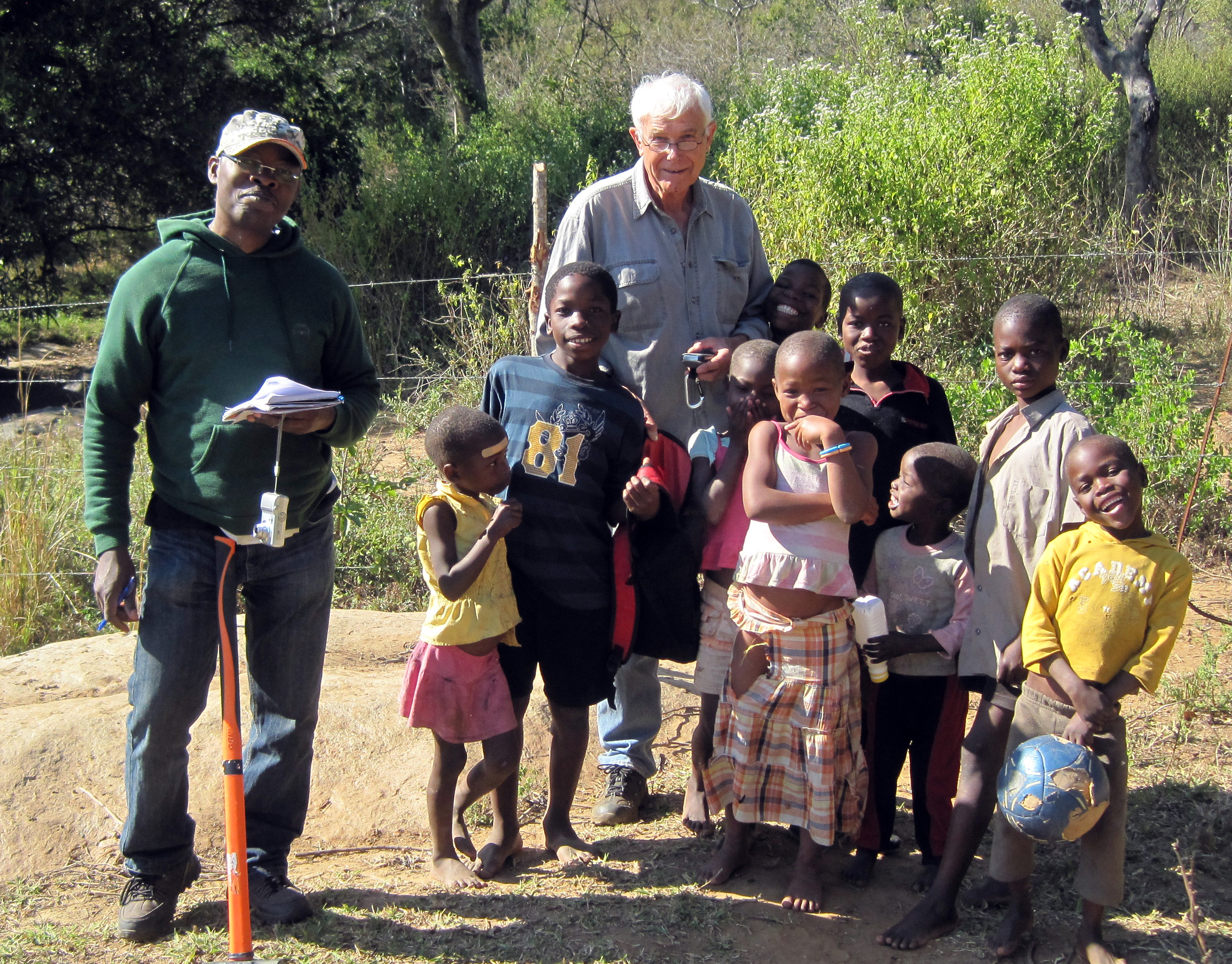
Kröner in Swaziland in 2013 with geologist Emmanuel and local kids

Kröner died in Freiburg.

When he died, Google Scholar showed that he had almost 35,000 citations in the peer-reviewed scientific literature and a Hirsch index of 107.

== Publications ==
=== Books ===
- Late Precambrian formations in the western Richtersveld, Northern Cape Province by A Kröner [Cape Town] : Precambrian Research Unit, University of Cape Town, 1974. ISBN 0-7992-0116-2
- Precambrian plate tectonics by A Kröner. Amsterdam; New York : Elsevier Scientific Pub. Co.; New York : Elsevier North-Holland [distributor], 1981. ISBN 0-444-41910-1
- Field Geology of High-Grade Gneiss Terrains : C. W. Passchier, Myers, JS, and Kroner, A. Springer-Verlag, 1990, (ISBN 3-540-53053-3).
- Precambrian tectonics illustrated by Alfred Kröner; Reinhard Greiling; International Union of Geological Sciences. Stuttgart : Schweizerbart, 1984. ISBN 3-510-65118-9, ISBN 978-3-510-65118-4
- Archaean Geochemistry: The Origin and Evolution of the Archaean Continental Crust GN Hanson, AM Goodwin, A Kröner - 1984
- Geology of Northeast Africa H Schandelmeier, RJ Stern, A Kröner - 1994 - Springer International
