= Mafaz Al-Suwaidan =

American academic, producer, and writer

- Born: Tulsa, Oklahoma, United States
- Education: Harvard University (PhD candidate); Harvard Divinity School (MTS); Emerson College (MFA); Toronto Metropolitan University (BJourn)
- Father: Tareq Al-Suwaidan
- Website: mafazalsuwaidan.com

Mafaz Al-Suwaidan (Arabic: مفاز السويدان) is an American scholar and doctoral candidate at Harvard University. She is a producer and writer for American Muslims (2024), a Webby-nominated PBS film series of documentary films exploring the history of Muslims in the United States.

== Early and personal life ==
Al-Suwaidan was born in Oklahoma and spent some of her youth in Kuwait and Canada. Her father is Tareq Al-Suwaidan, a Kuwaiti Islamic author and speaker, and business professional listed among the 500 Most Influential Muslims.

In 2010, she married Kuwaiti singer-songwriter Humood AlKhudher, but they later separated.

== Education ==
Al-Suwaidan received her undergraduate degree in journalism from Toronto Metropolitan University in 2011. She then worked briefly as a journalist in Kuwait. In 2016, she received her Master of Fine Arts (MFA) degree from Emerson College, in Boston, Massachusetts.

She earned a Master of Theological Study (MTS) degree from Harvard Divinity School in 2018. She is currently a PhD candidate at Harvard University in Philosophy of religion, focused on Islam and Modern thought, with a secondary degree in African and African American Studies. She is a member of the Harvard's Committee on the Study of Religion.

She was the Dorothy Porter & Charles Harris Wesley Fellow for 2024–2025 at the Hutchins Center for African and African American Research at Harvard University. As of the fall 2025, she holds a fellowship at the Abdallah S. Kamel Center for the Study of Islamic Law and Civilization at Yale Law School.

== Activism ==
Al-Suwaidan is a lifelong supporter of social justice, human rights, and particularly, Palestinian liberation.

She participated in conversations and writings about racism in the Arab world in context of the Black Lives Matter movement. She started the #ArabsForBlackLives campaign with Egyptian-American community organizer, Rana Abdel Hamid, about how Arabs can and should work to fight anti-Black racism.

In 2021, when philosopher Cornel West had threatened to (and eventually did) leave Harvard after his request for tenure was denied; Al-Suwaidan, who had trained with West as a master's student, organized a letter of support for him, which was signed by more than 60 other doctoral candidates.

She was one of the representatives of HGSU-UAW who wrote a letter in February 2024 to Shawn Fain, president of the United Auto Workers (UAW), on behalf of the UAW Arab Caucus, demanding the union divest from Israel.

In March 2024, Al-Suwaidan, Rabbi Professor Shaul Magid, and Madeline J. Levy (a PhD candidate) were chosen for a Lowell House panel discussion on Islamophobia and antisemitism. Following criticism of the range of political views offered by the Jewish and Muslim panelists, Lowell House Faculty Deans and the Edmond and Lily Safra Center for Ethics removed themselves as co-sponsors. The event was cancelled when Al-Suwaidan also withdrew.

In July 2025, Al-Suwaidan was chosen to moderate at a book event at Brookline Booksmith in Brookline. Journalist Aymann Ismail was discussing his memoir "Becoming Baba", which is about Muslim parenting in the United States. Heckling protesters showed up to the event to protest the book, which contains several pages about the genocide in Gaza. Protesters stated that Al-Suwaidan was the target of the heckling for her anti-Zionist activism at Harvard University.
