= L'Malouma Saïd =

Mauritanian anti-slavery activist (born 1972)

- المعلومة سعيد
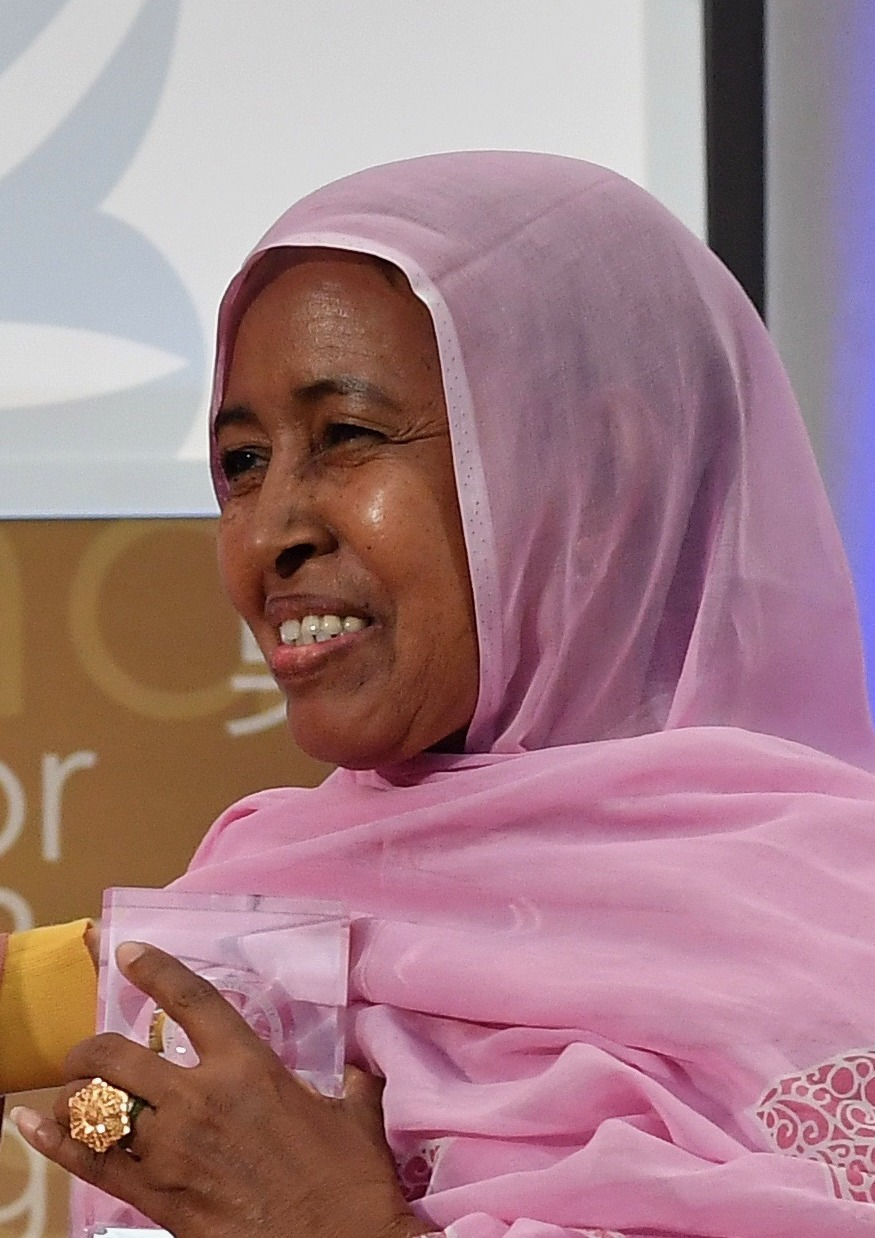
- Born: 1972 (age 53–54); Boutilimit Department
- Occupation: Politician
- Known for: Anti-slavery activism

L'Malouma Saïd (Arabic: المعلومة سعيد; born 1972) is a Mauritanian anti-slavery activist, deputy (Member of Parliament) to the Mauritanian National Assembly.

== Life ==
Saïd was born a slave in the town of Boutilimit, southeast of the Mauritanian capital Nouakchott, in 1972.

At the age of seventeen, she became an activist for the emancipation of the Haratin. She joined the Haratin Liberation Organization (El Hor) in 1990 and took part in the emergence of the first opposition political parties, with the RFD or Ralliement des forces democratiques in 1991, and Action pour le changement or AC in 1995, which engage in particular against slavery. She also takes care of a merchant cooperative and becomes its president. She became responsible for women in the El Hor movement, and a founding member of the anti-slavery organization SOS Esclaves, headed by her husband, Boubacar Ould Messaoud.

In 2006, she was elected to the Mauritanian National Assembly. She is one of four Haratine women elected. She was re-elected in 2013. She is known for her stance on human rights, against discrimination, and for her fight to improve prisons in Mauritania.

In March 2018, Saïd was one of the laureates of the International Women of Courage Award.
