= Muzaffar Iqbal =

Pakistani-Canadian Islamic scholar

Muzaffar Iqbal مظفر اقبال
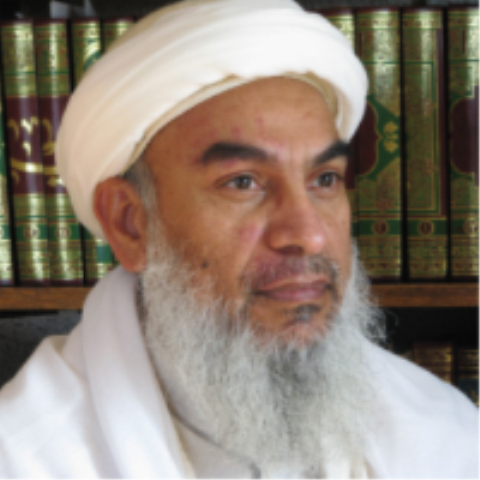
- Iqbal in 2013
- Born: 1954 (age 71–72); Lahore, Punjab. Dominion of Pakistan
- Citizenship: Canada
- Known for: Islam and science, Qur'anic studies and Islam and the West

Academic background
- Education: University of the Punjab; University of Saskatchewan
- Influences: Seyyed Hossein Nasr

Muzaffar Iqbāl (Punjabi/Urdu: مظفر اقبال; born December 3, 1954, in Lahore, Punjab, Pakistan) is a Pakistani-Canadian Islamic scholar and author.

== Career ==
Iqbal is the President of Center for Islamic Sciences, Canada. Previously he has worked at University of Multan, Pakistan (1977–1979), University of Saskatchewan, SK, Canada (1979–84), where he taught chemistry, South-East Asian Studies Department, University of Wisconsin-Madison (1984–85), where he taught Urdu language and literature, Montreal Neurological Institute (MNI) of McGill University (1986–87), where he worked on development of radio-active tracer drugs for imaging brain cancer, Wood Buffalo National Park, Fort Chipewyan, Alberta (1989), where he worked at the Warden's office. Between 1990 and 1999, he lived and worked in Islamabad, Pakistan: During 1992–1996, he was Director (Scientific Information) at the Ministerial Standing Committee on Scientific and Technological Cooperation of the OIC (Organization of Islamic Cooperation), abbreviated as COMSTECH. In 1996, he resigned in protest and in 1998, joined Pakistan Academy of Sciences as Director (International Scientific Cooperation). He moved back to Canada in 1999 and between 1999 and 2002, he was the Director of Science and Religion course program of the Center for Theology and Natural Sciences (CTNS), Berkeley, a research center of the Graduate Theological Union. In 2000, Iqbal established the Center for Islam and Science, Alberta, Canada, (renamed Center for Islamic Sciences in 2013). As the founding President of CIS, Director Iqbal travelled in Europe, the Muslim World, and some parts of Far East in relation to his research and teaching work in Islam and Science discourse. Since 2008, he has devoted most of his work to Qur'anic studies. In 2009, he initiated a project to produce the first English language encyclopedia of the Qur'an exclusively based on fourteen centuries of Islamic scholarship, The Integrated Encyclopedia of the Qur'an (IEQ). The first volume was published in 2013; the second volume, published in 2024, completes one-third of the Project. In 2020, the IEQ project was expanded to include an e-version of IEQ. Iqbal is also the editor of a bi-annual journal devoted to Islamic perspectives on science and civilization, Islamic sciences (formerly, Islam & Science).

Iqbal's published works include 23 books and over 100 papers on Islam, Sufism, Muslims and their relationship with modernity. His work has been translated into Persian, Arabic, Urdu, Malay and Korean.

Iqbal appeared on PBS's Ask the Experts in 2003, discussing "Can We Believe in Both Science and Religion?" In another show in 2003, he joined a panel to discuss "Can Religion Withstand Technology?"

In an article on Islamic science, the New York Times quoted Iqbal as explaining that modern science did not claim to address the purpose of life, whereas in the Islamic intellectual tradition, the question of purpose was integral to the quest for knowledge.

Iqbal was one of the experts called on by the Physics and Cosmology Group of the Center for Theology and the Natural Sciences, alongside scientists including Andrei Linde of Stanford University, John Polkinghorne of Cambridge University, Paul Davies of Macquarie University and Charles Townes of the University of California, Berkeley. Between 1996 and 2003, the group conducted an intensive public dialogue on science and spirituality.

== Reception ==
Roxanne D. Marcotte, reviewing Iqbal's Islam and Science, published in 2002, wrote that it "presents an articulate and concise historical introduction to intellectual developments that have shaped Islamic civilization, both religious and scientific."

The first volume of the Integrated Encyclopedia of the Qur'an has been described by Andrew Rippin as "sumptuous and carefully produced," "an impressive beginning", and "a considerable contribution to the study of the Qur'an".

== Publications ==
Iqbal has written, edited, and translated twenty-three books. He is the General Editor of the Integrated Encyclopedia of the Qur’an, the first English-language reference work on the Qur’an exclusively based on fourteen centuries of Muslim scholarship. He is also the Series Editor for Ashgate's Islam and Science: Historic and Contemporary Perspectives, a four-volume edited work that brings together the most important and influential articles on various aspects of the relationship between Islam and science from the beginning of the twentieth century to the present. He has authored twenty-one books and over one hundred articles covering three broad areas within the framework of Muslim encounter with modernity: the impact of this encounter on Muslim understanding of their own spiritual and intellectual traditions, the role of modern science and technology in the reshaping of the Muslim Ummah, and Qur’anic studies, including Western academic studies on the Qur’an. His books and articles have been translated into Persian, Bahasa Indonesia, Albanian, and Korean.

=== In Urdu ===
- Muzaffar Iqbal. Jang-e Azadi Sey Hasooley Azadi Tak. Lahore: Sang-e-Meel Publishers, 1977. A book on the history of the Pakistan Movement. In Urdu.
- Muzaffar Iqbal. Inkhila (Uprooting). Book I of the fiction trilogy Hijratayn (Exiles). Lahore: The Circle, 1988. In Urdu.
- Muzaffar Iqbal. Inqta (Severance). Book II of the fiction trilogy Hijratayn (Exiles). Islamabad: Leo Books, 1994. In Urdu.
- Muzaffar Iqbal. Herman Melville: Life and Works. Serialized in Savera (1995–1998).

=== In English ===
- Muzaffar Iqbal. Abdullah Hussein: From Sad Generations to a Lonely Tiger. South Asian Centre, University of Wisconsin-Madison, 1985. Repr. as Abdullah Hussein: The Chronicler of Sad Generations. Islamabad: Leo Books, 1993.
- Muzaffar Iqbal and Zafar Ishaq Ansari (Translators). Towards Understanding the Qur'an. Vol. VII. Islamic Foundation, 2001. English translation of Syed Abul Ala Mawdudi's Tafhim al-Qur'an.
- Muzaffar Iqbal. Islam and Science. Aldershot: Ashgate, 2002. Reprinted in the Routledge Revivals series 2017; reprinted in Pakistan as Islam and Science: Explorations in the Fundamental Questions of the Islam and Science Discourse. Lahore: Suheyl Academy, 2004. Persian Translation, Astana Quds, Mashhad, 2010.
- Muzaffar Iqbal. Science and Islam. Greenwood Press, 2007. Repr. with Afterword as The Making of Islamic Science. Islamic Book Trust, 2009.
- Muzaffar Iqbal. Islam, Science, Muslims, and Technology: Seyyed Hossein Nasr in Conversation with Muzaffar Iqbal. Islamic Book Trust, 2007. Repr. Sherwood Park: al-Qalam Publishing, 2007; Tehran: Institute for Humanities and Cultural Studies, 2008; Islamabad: Dost Publications, 2009.
- Muzaffar Iqbal. Dew on Sunburnt Roses and other Quantum Notes. Dost Publications, 2008.
- Muzaffar Iqbal. Dawn in Madinah: A Pilgrim's Passage. Islamic Book Trust, 2008. Repr. Dost Publications, 2009.

== Books edited by Iqbal (literature, English) ==
- Colours of Loneliness: An anthology of Pakistani Literature, Oxford University Press, 1999.
- Pakistani Literature (ed.) vol. 1, 2 and 4, Pakistan Academy of Letters, Islamabad 1992–93.
- Islam and Science: Historic and Contemporary Perspectives, 4 vols., Aldershot: Ashgate, 2011, reprinted by Routledge, 2018.
- Integrated Encyclopedia of the Quran Volume 1. Center for Islamic Sciences, 2013.
- Integrated Encyclopedia of the Quran Volume II. Center for Islamic Sciences, 2024.
