= Precambrian Research =

Scientific journal established in 1974

- Subject: Geology of the Earth and its planetary neighbors
- Language: English
- Edited by: V. Pease

Publication details
- History: 1974-present
- Publisher: Elsevier
- Frequency: 16/year
- Open access: Hybrid
- Impact factor: 3.8 (2022)

Standard abbreviations
- ISO 4: Precambrian Res.

Indexing
- ISSN: 0301-9268

Links
- Journal homepage; Online archive

Precambrian Research is a peer-reviewed scientific journal covering the geology of the Earth and its planetary neighbors. It is published by Elsevier and, as of 2014, the editor-in-chief is V. Pease (Stockholm University). It was established in 1974. According to the Journal Citation Reports, the journal has a 2022 impact factor of 3.8.
