= Abdul Majeed al-Zindani =

Yemeni politician (1942–2024)

Prof. Dr. Abdul Majeed al-Zindani
- عبد المجيد الزنداني
- Born: January 1, 1942; Ibb, Kingdom of Yemen
- Died: April 22, 2024 (aged 82); Istanbul, Turkey
- Occupations: Academic, politician
- Notable work: The Developing Human: Clinically Oriented Embryology with Islamic Additions

Abdul Majeed al-Zindani (Arabic: عبد المجيد الزنداني, romanized: ʿAbd al-Majīd al-Zindānī; January 1, 1942 – April 22, 2024) was a Yemeni Islamist politician and founder and head of the Iman University in Yemen. He was also the head of Al-Islah political movement and founder of the Commission on Scientific Signs in the Quran and Sunnah, based in Saudi Arabia. He has been described by Daniel Golden of the Wall Street Journal as "a charismatic Yemeni academic and politician" and by CNN as "a provocative cleric with a flaming red beard".

== Life and career ==
Al-Zindani spent his early college years in Egypt, and studied at Ain Shams University (first studying biology and chemistry, but then switching to Islamic studies) but did not complete a degree. He returned to Aden in 1966, went to Saudi Arabia in 1967 where he was a senior official in the Islamic Call Organization, and was sent home in 1962 when he was arrested by the ruler of Egypt. He returned to Yemen in 1962 as a delegator to represent his master Al-Zubiri in the conference revolutionary republicans and monarchic forces. Zindani, under the leadership of Al-Zubiri, advocated for a revolution and played a role in mobilizing Yemeni people against the monarchy.

When he returned to Yemen he formed the Yemeni Muslim Brotherhood and devoted his life to politics.

=== Iman University ===
Al-Zindani was the founder and president of the Iman University in Sanaa, Yemen. The institution was founded in 1995 with Yemeni government support. It also received foreign donations from the conservative Wahhabist heritage nations of Saudi Arabia and Qatar, receiving about 400 students annually.

The U.S. Treasury stated that Zindani was loyal to bin Laden and that some students at Iman University had been arrested for political and religious murders. Some believe that the school's curriculum deals mostly, if not exclusively, with Islamic studies, and that it is an incubator of extremism.

The Sunday Times established that Umar Farouk Abdulmutallab, the Northwest Airlines Flight 253 suspected bomber who was arrested on Christmas Day 2009, attended lectures by al-Awlaki at the university in 2005.

=== Political activity ===
Al-Zindani was "a leading member" of Yemen's al-Islah Party (the Yemeni Congregation for Reform), of which Tawakel Karman, who was awarded the 2011 Nobel Peace Prize, was also a member.

==== Commission on Scientific Signs in the Quran and Sunnah ====
Al-Zindani approached the Saudi government's largest charity, the Muslim World League, in 1984 to establish a Commission on Scientific Signs in the Quran and Sunnah, based in Saudi Arabia. He headed the Commission as secretary general until stepping down in 1995. Although he no longer had any official role with the Muslim World League, he was still invited to its events.

A criticism made of the commission is that in its enthusiasm to prove that evidence in favor of Qur'anic scientific miracles "is clear and obvious" and that "a group of eminent non-Muslim scholars in several fields" has testified to this, the commission has spread misleading, out-of-context statements by several of these non-Muslim scholars. In 1984, a member of the commission, Mustafa Abdul Basit Ahmed, moved to the United States to recruit non-Muslim Western scientists to verify the miraculous signs of the Quran. However, in a 2002 story in the American newspaper The Wall Street Journal, several non-Muslim scientists spoke of questionable practices used by the commission to coax statements from them, such as hard-sell interviews by Sheikh Abdul Majeed al-Zindani, and false promises to be "completely neutral."

The commission drew the scientists to its conferences with first-class plane tickets for them and their wives, rooms at the best hotels, $1,000 honoraria, and banquets with Muslim leaders – such as a palace dinner in Islamabad with Pakistani President Mohammed Zia ul-Haq shortly before he was killed in a plane crash. Ahmed also gave at least one scientist a crystal clock.

Marine scientist William Hay complained of having fallen into a "trap" in interviews, while embryologist Gerald Goeringer claimed "mutual manipulation" between the scientists and conference organizers. Retired Geologist Professor Alfred Kröner of the University of Mainz has a standard e-mail reply clarifying his "out of context" remarks during one of the conferences and has described the proceedings which resulted in his remarks being used by Muslim apologists. In a video recorded interview, he describes the events and explains how he was asked to answer purely hypothetical questions and it was from these answers that he was subsequently quote-mined and misrepresented. More recently, the YouTube user TheRationalizer recorded interviews with William Hay, Alison (Pete) Palmer, Prof Tom Armstrong and Alfred Kröner in order to give them the opportunity to put forward their accounts of the events and explain their true opinions in full, without editing.

==== AIDS research ====
Al-Zindani gave a speech praising the quality of scientific and medical research carried out at the Iman University, claiming that they had successfully treated many cases of AIDS. In 20 cases, al-Zindani said that the virus had vanished completely without any side effects, and he called on the UN, which "spends enormous amounts of money to fight the disease," to send "its senior scientists to review [the university's] findings."

Dr. Jamil al-Mughales, the head of the Clinical Immunology Services of King Abdulaziz University, has disputed al-Zindani's results, saying he personally inspected blood tests, and contradicting al-Zindani's claims.

Later, Al-Zindani applied for a patent for a herbal method purporting to treat AIDS; the application was published on the World Intellectual Property Organization website in April 2011.

==== Vice and virtue movement ====
In July 2008, Al-Zindani joined a panel of Islamic clerics and prominent tribal chiefs to announce the creation of a new morality authority. The Meeting for Protecting Virtue and Fighting Vice declared its intention to alert Yemen's police force to infringements of Islamic law. The declaration followed reports of vigilante activity by self-appointed 'morality guardians' in Hodeidah, Aden, and Sana'a.

=== Jyllands-posten cartoon controversy ===
In 2006, Zindani pressed charges against 21 newspapers and their editors in Yemen for reprinting the controversial Muhammad cartoons, originally printed in the Danish newspaper Jyllands-Posten in 2005. On November 25, 2006, al-Zindani won the first case—against the newspaper Al-Rai Al-A'm—and the newspaper was ordered to cease printing for six months, and its editor was sentenced to one year of prison.

=== US ban ===
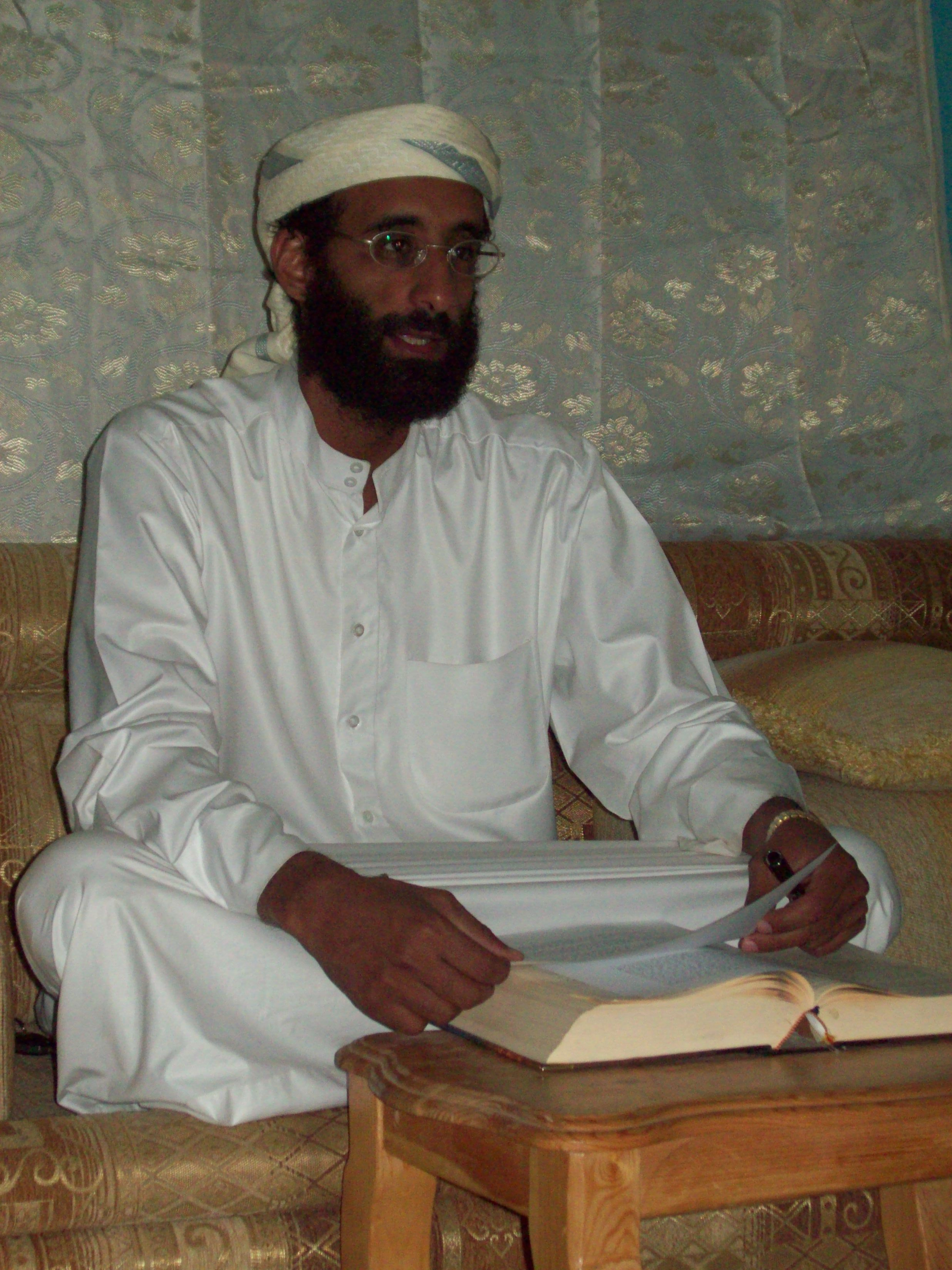
Anwar al-Awlaki, who attended and lectured at the university

On February 24, 2004, the US Treasury Department issued an order labeling Zindani a "Specially Designated Global Terrorist". The department said that Zindani had a "long history of working with bin Laden, notably serving as one of his spiritual leaders", and that he "served as a contact for Ansar al-Islam, an Iraqi and Syrian based terrorist organization linked to al-Qaeda". The department also stated that it suspected students of his Al Iman University of assassinating three American missionaries, and "the number two leader for the Yemeni Socialist Party, Jarallah Omar". Anwar Al Awlaki also took classes and lectured at Iman University, headed by Zindani.

John Walker Lindh is a former student of Iman University linked to terrorist groups. Iman University made several press statements declaring that neither Alawlaki or Abdulmutallab have studied at the university and they didn't attend any lectures at Iman University. The university also asked the American administration to prove their claims.

Zindani's name was subsequently submitted to the UN 1267 Committee's list of individuals belonging to or associated with al-Qaeda. Among the factors offered to Guantanamo detainee Abdul Rahman Mohamed Saleh Naser's Administrative Review Board, justifying his continued extrajudicial detention, were:

1. "The detainee decided to go to Afghanistan after hearing and speaking with Sheik Al Zindani.
2. "Abd Al Majid Zandani was an active supporter of Usama Bin Laden. Zandani was involved in raising funds and recruiting volunteers for the Bin Laden organization. Zandani is also a religious and legal expert for Usama Bin Laden.
3. "Executive Order 13224 designates Shaykh Abd Al Majid Al Zindani as a person who commits, threatens to commit, or supports terrorism."

Zindani said, after the US accusations against him, that he would appear in the Yemeni courts if the Yemeni government asks him to do so. Zindani's argument was that the US administration is using "terrorists list" for political reasons and the US administration would add anyone who raises his voice to defend the sovereignty of his country to that list.

However, after the failure of the UN and the American administration to answer the several requests of the Yemeni Government to provide them with proofs that show the involvement of Zindani in terrorist actions or attempts, the Yemeni government asked the American administration to remove Zindani's name from its "terrorists list".

In mid-January 2010, Zindani said he would call for jihad in the event that US troops were sent to Yemen. He added that Yemen is an independent sovereign state and any foreigner attack in the Yemeni lands would be considered as an attack to all Yemenis.

=== Protests in Yemen ===
Zindani Played an important role in the Yemeni Revolution that raised in 2011 first as a meditator between the opposition and the Yemeni President Ali Abdullah Salih. However, when Zindani realized that Salih was preparing his troops to suppress Yemeni revolutionary youth, he went to "change square" and declared his support to the revolution. The New York Times reported that protests outside the American embassy in Yemen on September 13, 2012 began hours after Zindani urged followers to emulate protests in Libya and Egypt, according to some residents of Sana. Protesters were denouncing a video (Innocence of Muslims) caricaturing the prophet Mohammed and Islam.

=== Houthi takeover in Yemen and death ===
Following the Houthi takeover in Yemen, al-Zindani escaped from Houthis after they took control of the capital Sana’a in 2014, towards the city of Taiz (southwest), before heading to Saudi territories through the port of Al-Wadia (east), in a journey described as an "adventure" after passing through Houthi checkpoints. In October 2017, he was reported to be under house arrest in Saudi Arabia. In November 2020 he moved from Saudi Arabia to Turkey, where he died on April 22, 2024, at the age of 82.
