= Terra Nova (journal) =

- Discipline: Solid Earth Science, Planetary Science
- Language: English
- Edited by: Jean Braun, Georges Calas, Max Coleman, Carlo Doglioni, Klaus Mezger & Jason Phipps Morgan

Publication details
- Publisher: John Wiley & Sons Ltd

Standard abbreviations
- ISO 4: Terra Nova

Indexing
- ISSN: 1365-3121

Links
- Online access

Terra Nova is a peer-reviewed scientific journal about geology and planetary science published by John Wiley & Sons Ltd. As of 2023, it had an impact factor of 2.2.
