= William W. Hay =

American marine geologist (1934–2022)

William Winn Hay (October 12, 1934 – October 27, 2022) was an American geologist, marine geologist, micropaleontologist, paleoceanographer, and paleoclimatologist, primarily associated with the University of Colorado.

== Biography ==
Hay was born October 12, 1934, in Dallas, Texas, the second son of Stephen John and Avella Hay.

== Academic career ==
Hay received his B.S. in biology from Southern Methodist University in 1955, M.S. in geology at the University of Illinois at Urbana in 1958, and Ph.D. in geology at Stanford University in 1960. As an undergraduate and graduate student he also studied at the Ludwig-Maximilians-Universität München (LMU) and the University of Zurich as a Fellow of the Swiss Friends of the USA.

Hay began his academic career at the University of Illinois in Urbana in 1960. From 1968 to 1974, he was jointly professor of geology at the University of Illinois and professor of marine geology and geophysics at the Rosenstiel School of Marine and Atmospheric Sciences (RSMAS) of the University of Miami before serving as chairman of the Division of Marine Geology and Geophysics at RSMAS for 2 years, and Dean from 1976-1980. He was president of Joint Oceanographic Institutions, Inc., in Washington, D.C., from 1979 to 1982.

In 1982, he became director of the University of Colorado at Boulder’s Museum, and in 1983 became professor in the department of geological sciences and joined the Cooperative Institute for Research in the Environmental Sciences (CIRES). From 1990 to 1998, was visiting professor at GEOMAR, a marine geological research institute attached to Christian-Albrecht’s-Universität, Kiel, Germany.

From 1991 to 1996, Hay also held positions at the Institute for Baltic Sea Research in Warnemünde, Germany; University of Vienna’s Institut für Paläontologie; Ernst-Moritz-Arndt University’s Geologische Institut in Greifswald, Germany; and as L.C. Donders Professor at the Institute of Earth Sciences, University of Utrecht, The Netherlands.

Retiring from the University of Colorado in 1998, he became professor of paleoceanology at GEOMAR, retiring in June 2002. He was professor emeritus of geological sciences at the University of Colorado, and lived in Estes Park, Colorado.

Hay was advisor and mentor to approximately 40 graduate students during their Master’s and Doctoral studies, variously at the University of Illinois, University of Miami, Université de Paris, (Orsay), Swiss Federal Institute of Technology, Zürich, Louis Pasteur University (Strasbourg, France), University of Colorado at Boulder, and Christian- Albrechts Universität, Kiel.

His later research interests included global paleoclimatic and paleoceanographic modeling and the global carbon cycle.

== Citation in Quranic discussion ==
Hay has cited in a number of Islamic articles as having confirmed the claim made in the Quran that salt and fresh water do not mix (as claimed in Sura 55:19), or rather having a barrier between them. William Hay was recorded to have said in regard to the "Scientific information" in the Quran that:

"I find it very interesting that this sort of information is in the ancient scriptures of the Holy Qur'ân, and I have no way of knowing where they would have come from. But I think it is extremely interesting that they are there and this work is going on to discover it, the meaning of some of the passages."

And when he was asked about the source of the Qur'an, he replied:

"Well, I would think it must be the divine being."

== Honors ==
Honors and awards received by Hay include the Leopold-von-Buch-Plakette of the Deutsche Geologische Gesellschaft (1976), Alexander von Humboldt Senior Research Scientist Award (1991), the Francis P. Shepard Medal for Marine Geology (1981) and the Twenhofel Medal for Outstanding Contributions to Sedimentary Geology (2006), both from the Society for Sedimentary Geology (SEPM). He was elected to the Deutsche Akademie der Naturforscher Leopoldina in 1986.

== Bibliography ==
- Hay, William W., 2016. Experimenting on a Small Planet - A Scholarly Entertainment. Springer International Publishing, Switzerland, 2nd edition. ISBN 978-3-319-27402-7. This work is an in-depth discussion of past and future climate change. PowerPoint presentations to accompany the book are available at
- Hay, William W., 2021. Experimenting on a Small Planet - A History of Scientific Discoveries, a Future of Climate Change and Global Warming. Springer Nature Switzerland, 3rd edition. ISBN 978-3-030-76338-1, ISBN 978-3-030-76339-8 (ebook).

Third and final edition of his Magnum Opus.

In addition to his book, he was the author or co-author of more than 260 scientific papers.
