= Al Resalah =

Arabic-language satellite television channel

Al-Resalah
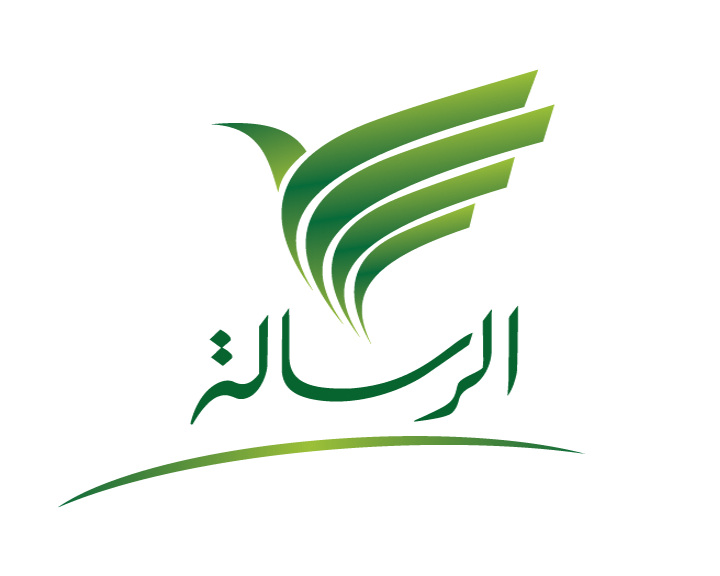
- Type: Satellite television network
- Country: Saudi Arabia
- Availability: Middle East, Europe, North Africa, Internet
- Owner: Prince Al-Waleed bin Talal
- Key people: Tareq Al-Suwaidan (Former General Manager)
- Launch date: 1 March 2006; 19 years ago
- Official website: http://www.alresalah.net

Al-Resalah (Arabic: قناة الرسالة; The Message) is an Arabic language satellite television channel "to present true Islam".

It is funded by Prince Al-Waleed bin Talal of Saudi Arabia, recorded in all over the United Arab Emirates to Morocco and Kuwait, and broadcast from Cairo. Al-Resalah has slots on the Arabsat and Nilesat satellites, serving primarily the Middle East, but North Africa and Europe as well.

The General Manager of Al Resalah was Tareq Al-Suwaidan, a former host at the Middle East Broadcasting Center (MBC) and a leading member of the Kuwaiti Muslim Brotherhood. Tareq Al-Suwaidan was fired from his job in August 2013 by the channel's owner, Prince Alwaleed bin Talal, because of Al-Suwaidan's support for the Muslim Brotherhood.

The head of Al Resalah’s programming in Egypt is Ahmed Abu Haiba, the original producer of Amr Khaled’s first television program.

The channel's advisory committee includes Sheikh Abdullah Bin Sulaiman Al-Manai (Senior Ulema Commission, Saudi Arabia); Dr. Abdallah Omar Naseef (president of the Muslim World Congress); Dr. Hamed Ahmad Al-Refaie (secretary-general of the MWC and president of the International Islamic Forum for Dialogue); Dr. Abdullah Al-Muslih (Commission on Scientific Signs in the Quran and Sunnah); Sheikh Ali Al-Nashwan (executive manager of the prince's Kingdom Holding Company's Humanitarian Division, and religious advisor to the prince); Dr. Abdulaziz Al-Askar (former head of the media department at Imam Muhammad ibn Saud Islamic University); and Dr. Walid Arab Hashem (Shura Council member).

Al Resalah’s website features a list of fatwas by Egypt’s preacher Yusuf Al Qaradawi approving music videos, SMS chatting and hosting non-veiled women on its shows.

== History ==
IslamOnline noted that Iqraa TV was the first Islamic channel created, followed by others such as Al-Fajr TV and Al-Manar. However, Al-Resalah had "taken things a step further, pushing forth into the wider realm of entertainment media". Al-Suwaidan too speaks of a nascent revival that has started not only in Muslim countries, but also within Muslim minorities, and that Al-Resalah hopes to contribute to.

In February 2008 al-Suwaidan explained that Al-Resalah began with a wide range of programmes, but in the end concentrated on religious features, aiming to be within the top ten by Ramadan 2008. He claimed that after only one and a half years, Al-Resalah ranks at 18 out of 400 Arab satellite channels and at number one among religious channels outside of Saudi Arabia. The target audience is Arab, young and female: according to al-Suwaidan, 70% of the viewers are women (60% according to Abu Haiba).

Some members of the Egyptian Muslim Brotherhood have expressed enthusiasm for the station. MEMRI, a nonprofit press monitoring and analysis organization with headquarters in Washington, DC, has accused Al-Resalah of airing anti-Western, anti-Semitic, and pro-al-Qaeda content.
