= Abdullah al-Muhaysini =

Saudi Arabian Salafi cleric

- عَبْد ٱللَّٰه ٱلمُحَيْسِنِي

Sheikh of the Hay'at Tahrir al-Sham
- In office 28 January 2017 – 21 November 2017

Qadi of the Jaish al-Fatah
- In office 24 March 2015 – 27 January 2017

Qadi of the Harakat Ahrar al-Sham al-Islamiyya
- In office Unknown–Unknown

Personal life
- Born: Buraidah, Al-Qassim Region, Saudi Arabia
- Education: Imam Muhammad ibn Saud Islamic University
- Other names: Arabic: عَبْد ٱللَّٰه مُحَمَّد ٱلشَّمَّرِي, romanized: Abdallāh Muḥammad aš-Šammarī, english: Abdullah Mohammed al-Shammari

Religious life
- Religion: Islam

Muslim leader
- Post: Qadi (Judge) of the Army of Conquest; Qadi (Judge) of the Harakat Ahrar al-Sham al-Islamiyya; Sheikh of Tahrir al-Sham

Abdullah al-Muhaysini (Arabic: عَبْد ٱللَّٰه ٱلمُحَيْسِنِي, romanized: ʿAbdallāh al-Muḥaysinī) is a Saudi Arabian Salafi cleric who is known for having served as a religious judge in the Army of Conquest in the Syrian Civil War.

== Early life ==
He was born in the city of Buraidah, al-Qasim, to a known religious family. Attending elementary school here, he continued secondary school and college in Mecca, where he also graduated from the University of Umm al-Qura in the field of Islamic Jurisprudence. Later he studied Comparative Jurisprudence in the Al-Imam Muhammad Ibn Saud Islamic University in Riyadh, writing a master treatise on the rule of war refugees according to Islam.

Muhaysini is married and has children.

His father Muhammad ibn Sulayman al-Muhaysini is a known Quran reciter and has served as the imam and preacher of a local mosque in Mecca. He has at least once been arrested by government authorities for his public prayers.

Abdullah al-Muhaysini arrived in Syria in 2013 after his uncle Omar al-Muhaysini had previously died there fighting the Syrian Arab Army.

== The Syrian civil war ==
Since his arrival in Syria in 2013, Muhaysini actively served as a preacher and judge, delivering sermons in local mosques, issuing religious verdicts and counseling Islamic groups. In addition he has appeared on the front lines a couple of times, motivating Syrian Opposition fighters and raising their morale. After the conquest of Idlib in 2015, he served as the official judge of the Army of Conquest for Idlib city. Working independently, Muhaysini has good ties to a great range of Islamic factions in Syria, which enables him to intervene in conflicts and settle on resolutions.

In late 2013, Muhaysini posted his support for the then-active Madid Ahl al-Sham campaign on Twitter while identifying one of the fundraiser's organizers, Sa'd bin Sa'd Muhammad Shariyan Al Ka'bi, and its location in Qatar. Madid Ahl al-Sham was a Qatar-based fundraising campaign identified by Muhaysini and others for its financial assistance for Jabhat al-Nusra. The U.S. Department of State identified Madid Ahl al-Sham as a "fundraising campaign that was suspected of sending funds to violent extremist elements in Syria." [viii]

In early 2014 Muhaysini served as a mediator, this time between ISIS and its rival jihadist groups, Al Nusra and Ahrar al-Sham. He tried to effect a truce between Islamist factions, which was rejected by ISIS. When al-Qaeda disowned ISIS in early 2014, al-Muhaysini called on ISIS members to defect to al-Nusra Front.

In July 2014 Muhaysini interceded in west Idlib during an FSA/Nusra conflict to mediate.

In 2014, Muhaysini endorsed scholars of the pro-jihad movement like Al-Balawi, Eyad Quneibi, Tareq Abdulhalim, Hani al-Siba'i, Yusuf al-Ahmed, Abdulaziz al-Tureifi, Suleiman al-Ulwan, Abu Qatada al-Filistini, and Abu Muhammad al-Maqdisi.

Lebanese singer Fadel Shaker received a message from Muhaysini in June 2015. Hassan Nasrallah was challenged to a debate by Muhaysini in June 2016.

In September 2015, he released a video showing the "Cubs of al-Aqsa" training camp for children.

After the Russian military intervention in Syria, al-Muhaysini threatened that Syria would be a "tomb for its invaders" or "graveyard for invaders" in response to the Russian intervention and brought up the Soviet–Afghan War. Muhaysini arranged for foreign fighters of multiple backgrounds to repeat the phrase "The Levant is the graveyard of the Russians", in a video message, among them was a fighter claiming to be from "East Turkestan", according to MEMRI. He declared that in Syria, women's participation in some theaters and jihad in general was obligatory after the Russian intervention.

Tawhid wal Jihad's leader Abu Saloh met with Abdullah Muhaysini in late 2015.

In early 2016, Muhaysini denounced the starvation of Sunnis in besieged Madaya, claiming that the starvation would cause the deaths of 40,000 Muslims there.

The Saudi incarceration of Abdulaziz Al Tarifi was decried by Muhaysini in April 2016 who warned against undermining the religious police.

In May 2016, he reportedly called for the substitution of the Turkish currency for the Syrian currency.

In June 2016, denying rumors of his death or injury, Muhaysini gave a speech.

Muhaysini publicly fundraised for the 2016 offensive to break the Siege of Aleppo from donors in Qatar and other Arabian Gulf states. In 2016, Muhaysini thanked donors for providing rockets to fighters in Syria.

In November 2016, Muhaysini tweeted a positive outlook on Trump's election victory for Sunni Muslims. Muhaysini said in a video that Muslims would benefit from open hostility towards them by Trump.

Muhaysini was listed for sanctions by the US Treasury in November 2016. Muhaysini called himself a "national symbol" according to Syrians and expressed his "shock" at being declared a terrorist by the United States Treasury when he spoke to The New York Times. Muhaysini posted a video replying to the terrorist designation by the USA.

=== Media ===
In October 2016, Turkish newspaper Yeni Şafak interviewed Muhaysini, praising Turkey for its role in Syria and denouncing Iran.

Muhaysini was many times interviewed by American journalist Bilal Abdul Kareem, who leads a pro-opposition news agency called "On the Ground News TV'' (OGN TV) that reports from Syria.

=== Turkistan Islamic Party ===
al-Muhaysini has close relations with the Turkistan Islamic Party (TIP).

He was featured, along with Hani al Siba'ee, Abu Qatada, and Abdurazak al-Mahdi in a Turkistan Islamic Party video in August 2015. In August 2015, Abdullah Al-Muhaysini praised the Turkistan Islamic Party fighters in their attacks against the "Nusayris" of Assad's army (Alawites).

At the end of 2015, the Turkistan Islamic Party released a video titled "A Message to the Turkestanis" (رسالة الى التركستانيين) featuring Abdullah Al-Muhaysini, an Al-Qaeda cleric of Saudi origin. Muhaysini urged the "Turkistani Musims" to raise their children to love death like "infidels" love life.

At the end of 2015, the Turkistan Islamic Party released a new video titled "Importance of Martyrdom Operations in Our Current Time" (أهمية العمليات الإستشهادية في زمننا الحاضر) (زامانىمىزدىكى پىدائىيلىق ئەمەلىيىتىنىڭ ئەھمىيىتى) by Abdullah al-Muhaysini.

In 2016, the Turkish Islamist publisher Beyaz Minare Kitap (White Minaret Book) published a Turkish language book titled "Türkistan'dan Şehadete Hicret Hikayeleri 1" containing the biographies of Turkistan Islamic Party fighters along with praise of TIP fighters by Abdullah al-Muhaysini.

Doğu Türkistan Bülteni Haber Ajansı reported that the Turkistan Islamic Party was praised by Abu Qatada along with Abdul Razzaq al Mahdi, Abu Muhammad al-Maqdisi, Muhaysini and Zawahiri in late 2016.

In 2016, Muhaysini visited Turkistan Islamic Party fighters before the battle and performed dua. Khan Tuman in Aleppo then came under attack by the TIP. A picture of Muhaysini with a Turkistan Islamic Party fighter in Khan Touman was released by the Turkistan Islamic Party after the battle. They displayed weapons and munitions seized during the battle. Corpses of what the TIP labelled as "Rawafid" (Shia) fighters and pictures of "Iranian" prisoners were released by the TIP.

The Turkistan Islamic Party in Syria released "Blessed Are the Strangers #6" featuring a speech by Hasan Mahsum, as well as by Army of Conquest leader Abdullah al-Muhaysini and fellow scholar Abdurazak al Mahdi at the start of 2017. In the video Abdul Razzaq al-Mahdi and Abdullah al-Muhaysini asked Muslims with money to aid the cause of the Turkistan Islamic Party and praised the Uyghur fighters for their role in the Syrian Civil War fighting against the Syrian government.

=== Tahrir al-Sham ===
In January 2017, after attacks on Jabhat Ahl al-Sham by Jabhat Fateh al-Sham, Jabhat Fateh al-Sham was asked to desist by Muhaysini.

Muhaysini, Abu Taher Al Hamawi, and Abdelrazzak Mehdi worked on the formation of the group Tahrir al-Sham (HTS) in January 2017. They are members of the group and appeared in its founding declaration. Attendance at a speech by Moheiseni was manipulated by drawing IDP impoverished people with promises of motorbikes and refrigerators through a raffle by HTS.

Muhaysini and the Turkistan Islamic Party negotiated between Tahrir al-Sham and Liwa al-Aqsa in the Idlib Governorate clashes (2017).

In late 2017, Muhaysini was reported to have defected from HTS. He later, in May 2023, apparently due to fear of being targeted by HTS, reportedly relocated to Turkey.

=== Fall of the Assad regime ===
Following the fall of the Assad regime in December 2024, Muhaysini visited the Umayyad Mosque in Damascus and held a speech.

== Controversy ==
There is a considerable amount of controversy surrounding Muhaysini.

In 2015, Muhaysini reportedly vowed to exterminate Alawite men and wrote that Alawite women could potentially be executed as apostates. Instructions on treatment of children and women of Alawites were given by Muhaysini on Twitter in 2015.

Virgins in the afterlife were promised before the battle of Khan Touman to suicide fighters by Muhaysini. In 2016, virgins whose spit would allegedly sweeten oceans in the afterlife were promised by Muhaysini to fighters before preparing for battle in Aleppo. Muhaysini launched 100 Elephant rockets against Aleppo at the beginning of the attempt to break the siege and thanked Persian Gulf businessmen and Turkey for funding the rockets.

The Saudi newspaper Okaz called Muhaysini a takfiri and a terrorist and accused him of trying to "Afghanize" Syria after he launched a mass recruitment campaign for jihad in Syria in May 2016.

In late 2016, Muhaysini released a video of himself congratulating a Saudi boy from Buraidah he was going to send off to be a suicide bomber, telling his mother that he would go to paradise and be rewarded with virgins, according to MEMRI. The Saudi newspaper Okaz denounced Muhaysini for sending off the Saudi boy as a suicide bomber in Aleppo after promising him virgins in the afterlife. Muhaysini responded against Okaz over the Takfiri label.

On 9 June 2017, he was one of 69 individuals designated by Saudi Arabia, United Arab Emirates, Egypt and Bahrain that have financed terrorist organizations and received support from Qatar.

In 2025, he openly advocated for democracy. 11 years ago, he called democracy and kufr and expressed his rejection of it.

When asked about the accession of the new regime of Damascus to the Global coalition of the United States to combat IS, Muhaysini replied that allegedly this step is a "religious duty of the new regime", and that allegedly Ahmad al-Sharaa asked the opinion of 20 people calling themselves "scholars and sheikhs" from Syria and not only that allegedly all of them approved this, and some of them informed the Syrian president that joining the Global alliance to combat terrorism is mandatory واجب شرعي "from the point of view of Sharia".

Remarkably, a few years ago Muhaysini referred to the possibility of cooperation with the Global coalition as a forbidden action and disbelief leading out of religion.

Muhaysini resented the users of social networks who spread his previous statements of many years ago, in which he reproaches the same thing for which he now praises the new regime, stating that "scholars change their opinion not because their religion has changed, but because their knowledge has expanded".
