= Abdul-Rahman Al-Sudais =

Imam in Mecca

His Excellency Sheikh Abdul Rahman Al-Sudais
- عبد الرحمن السديس
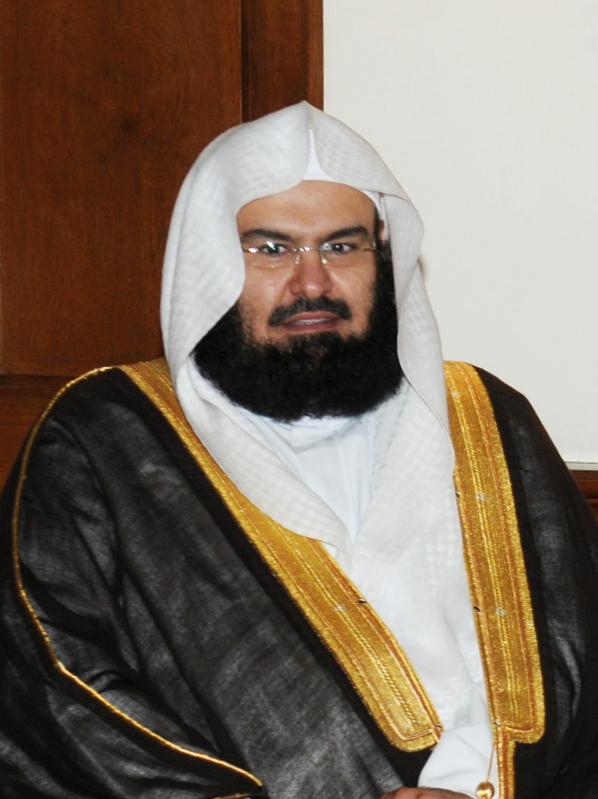
- Sudais in 2011

President of the Affairs of the Two Holy Mosques
- Incumbent
- Assumed office 8 May 2012
- Monarchs: King Abdullah; King Salman
- Deputy: Saad Al Mahameed

Imam of Masjid Al Haram
- Incumbent
- Assumed office 1984
- Monarchs: King Fahd; King Abdullah; King Salman

Personal life
- Born: 23 November 1963 (age 62) Al-Bukayriyah, Al-Qassim Province, Saudi Arabia
- Education: Umm al-Qura University; King Saud University
- Website: www.gph.gov.sa

Religious life
- Religion: Islam
- Denomination: Sunni
- Jurisprudence: Hanbali
- Creed: Athari
- Movement: Salafi
- Abdul-Rahman Al-Sudais' voice Reciting the Throne Verse

Abdul Rahman ibn Abdul Aziz al-Sudais (Arabic: عَبْدُ ٱلرَّحْمَٰنِ بْنُ عَبْدِ ٱلْعَزِيزِ ٱلسُّدَيْسِ, romanized: ʻAbd ar-Raḥman ibn ʻAbd al-ʻAziz as-Sudais; born 23 November 1963), better known as al-Sudais, is the Chief Imam of the Grand Mosque, Masjid al-Haram in Makkah and the President of the Affairs of the Two Holy Mosques. A Qāriʾ; In 2005 he was chosen the Dubai International Holy Qur'an Award's "Islamic Personality Of the Year".

Al-Sudais has preached Islam's opposition to "explosions and terrorism", and has called for peaceful inter-faith dialogue, but also been criticized for vilifying non-Muslims. He has denounced the treatment of Palestinians by Israeli settlers and the state of Israel, and called for more aid to be sent to Palestinians. In 2016, he delivered the Hajj sermon to a multitude of pilgrims gathered at Arafat after prayers.

== Life and career ==
Al-Sudais comes from the Anazzah clan, and he had memorized the Quran by the age of 12. Growing up in Riyadh, al-Sudais studied at the Al Muthana Bin Harith Elementary School, and afterwards the Riyadh Scientific Institution from which he graduated in 1979 with a grade of excellent. He obtained a degree in Sharia from Riyadh University in 1983, his Master's in Islamic fundamentals from the Sharia College of Imam Muhammad bin Saud Islamic University in 1987 and received his Ph.D. in Islamic Sharia from Umm al-Qura University in 1995 while working there as an assistant professor after serving at Riyadh University.

Sudais took up his imamate in 1984, at just 22-years of age, and conducted his first sermon at Masjid al-Haram in July 1984, other than this Sheikh Saud al-Shuraim - has been his partner in Taraweeh Prayers from 1994 till 2006, and again in 2014, 2019 and 2020. They were titled "Twins of the Haram". In 2005-2020, Sheikh Abdullah Awad al-Juhany and other imams of Masjid al-Haram such as Sheikh Yasser al-Dosari and Sheikh Bander Baleela took over al-Shuraim's position as imam of the first Rakat of the Khatm al-Quran (End of the Quran) Taraweeh prayer.

In 2005, al-Sudais was named by the Dubai International Holy Quran Award (DIHQA) Organising Committee as its 9th annual "Islamic Personality Of the Year" in recognition of his devotion to the Quran and Islam. When accepting his award in Dubai, he said: "The message of Islam and Muslims is modesty, fairness, security, stability, sympathy, harmony and kindness."

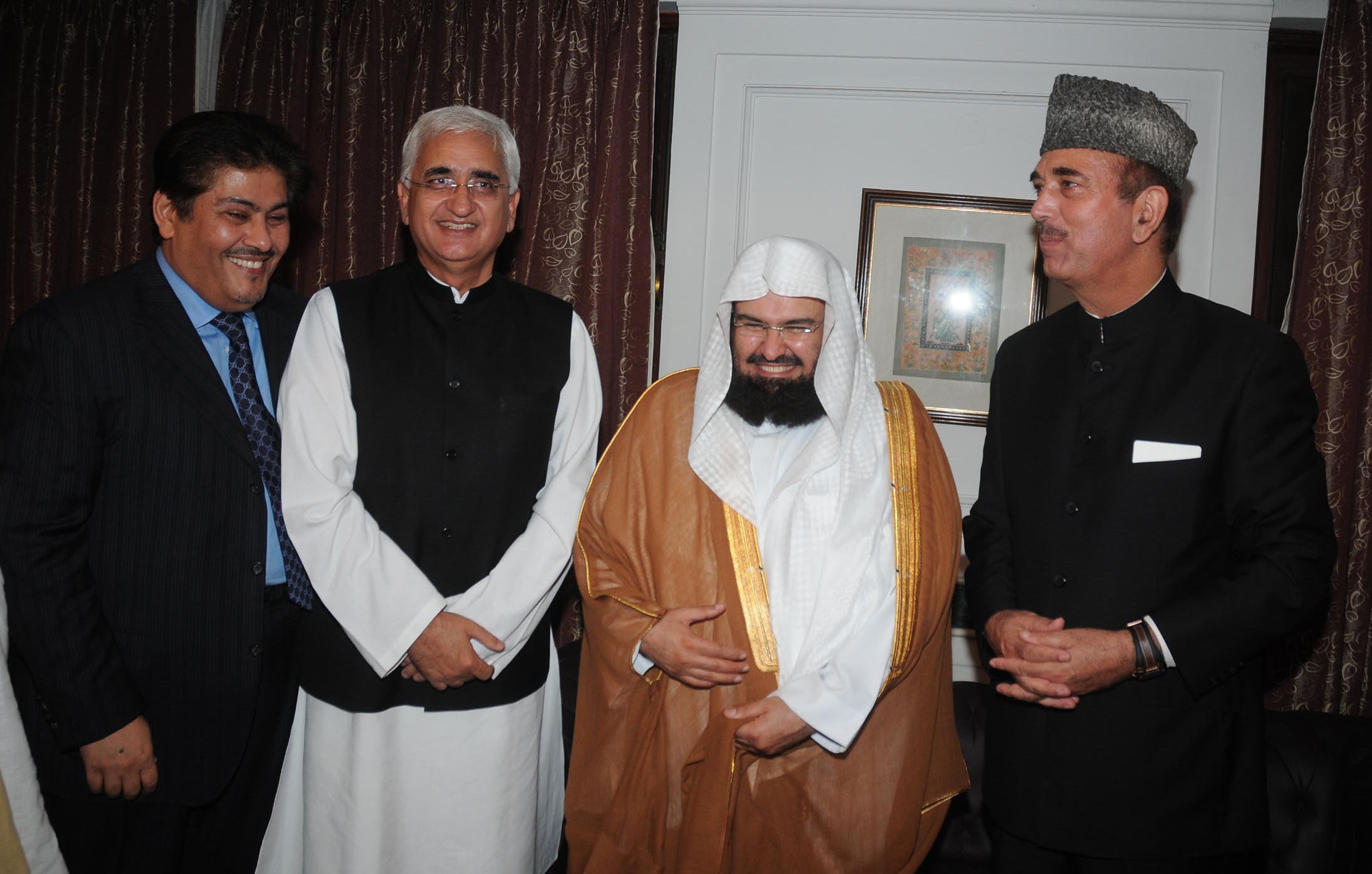
Al-Sudais with Indian Health Minister Ghulam Nabi Azad (right) in 2011.

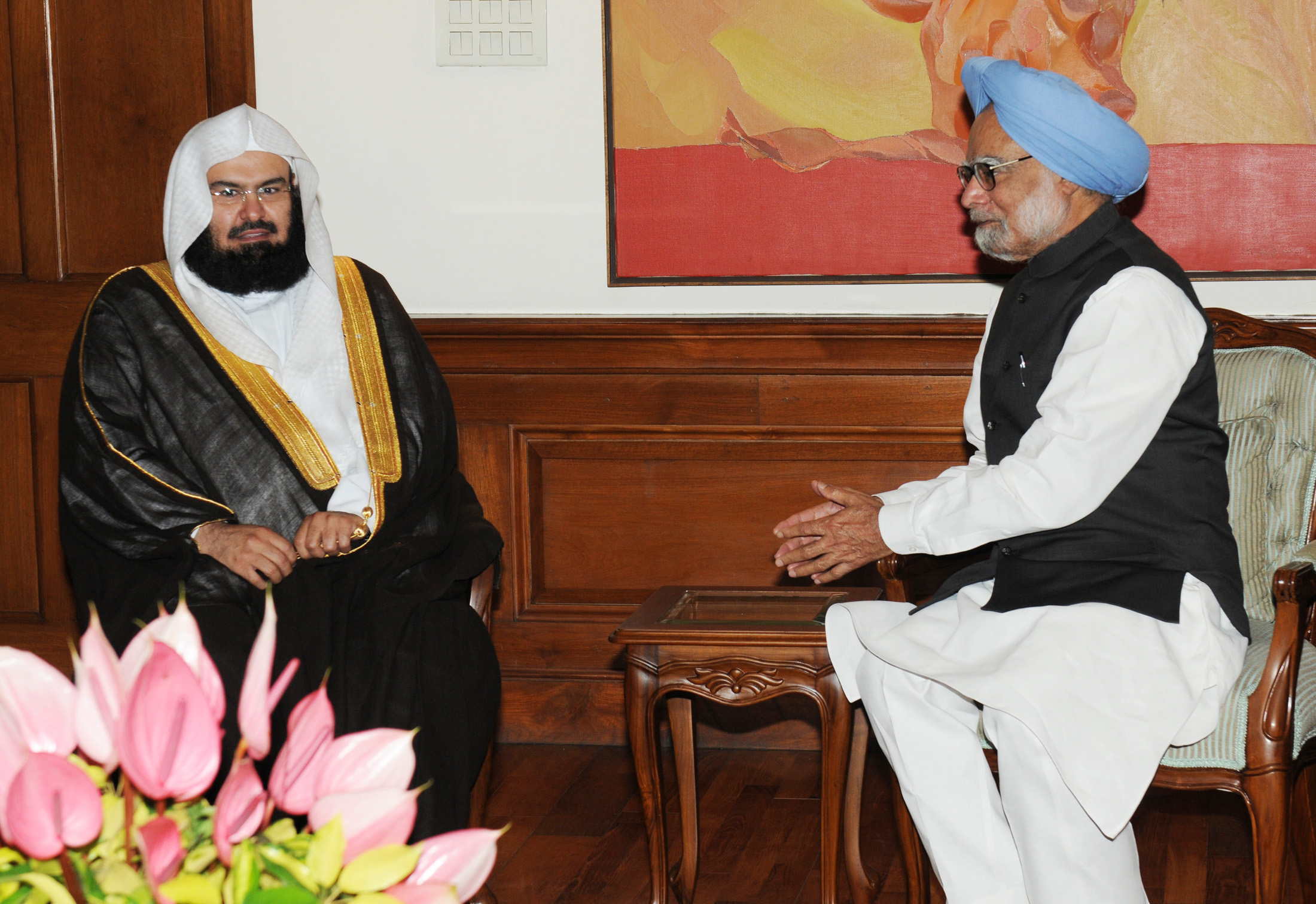
Al-Sudais with Indian Prime Minister Manmohan Singh.

From 2010 to 2012, he visited India, Pakistan, Malaysia and Britain. Among his activities was hosting a seminar at the Higher Institute for Advanced Islamic Studies in Malaysia in 2011, where he spoke about Islamic civilization against the backdrop of modern challenges.

He was appointed head of the "Presidency for the Two Holy Mosques at the rank of minister" by royal decree on 8 May 2012. He is also a member of the Arabic Language Academy at Mecca.

Abdul Razzaq al-Mahdi, Nabil al-Awadi, Tariq Abdelhaleem, and Hani al-Sibai who are linked to al-Qaeda, in addition to others like Adnan al-Aroor, Abd al-Aziz al-Fawzan, Mohamad al-Arefe, Abdul Rahman al-Sudais, Abdul-Aziz ibn Abdullah al-Shaykh and others were included on a death list by ISIS.

In 2017, al-Sudais supervised the film One Day in the Haram, a film about the Haram in Makkah, told through the eyes of the workers.

== Views, statements, prayers ==
=== Conflict resolution among Muslims ===
In 2003, Sudais stated that he believes that youth need to be taught Islamic law, including the precepts of the prohibition on killing oneself and the prohibition against attacking non-Muslims living in Islamic countries. Sudais has also said that Islamic youth should not "indiscriminately hurl the label of atheism and not to confuse between legitimate jihad and...the terrorizing of peaceable people."

Sudais has said that there is no room for extremism and sectarianism in Islam and that Islam teaches a moderate path. He said the solution to problems that Muslims face in Palestine, Somalia, Iraq, Kashmir, Yemen and Afghanistan lies in following the teachings of Islam in letter and spirit. He called for resolution of conflicts through dialogue and negotiations taking into consideration the social and economic benefits that can be achieved by resolving these disputes.

Sudais also criticized the Lal Masjid administration during the 2007 Red Mosque crisis in Islamabad, Pakistan. He urged the militants and the government to agree to a peaceful resolution through dialogue and urged both parties to protect peace.

Sudais is also known for his sermons calling on believers to help other Muslims in war-torn regions. He has actively spoken out against the persecution of Palestinians by Israeli settlers and the state of Israel, and has pleaded for medical supplies and food to be sent to the Palestinians.

=== Sin and drought ===
In a sermon on 13 November 2006, al-Sudais preached that the ongoing drought was caused by the proliferation of sin in Saudi society and the behavior of women in the kingdom who allegedly were "unveiling, mingling with men, and being indifferent to the hijab".

=== Prayers for inter-faith peace ===
In June 2004, Sudais led a following of 10,000 in prayers for inter-faith peace and harmony in London. Racial Equality Minister Fiona Mactaggart attended Sudais' sermon at the East London Mosque. Prince Charles, who was in Washington, took part by a pre-recorded message Britain's chief Rabbi, Jonathan Sacks, sent a message of support.

=== Remarks on Jews ===
In his sermon of April 19, 2002, broadcast on Saudi 1, al-Sudais referred to the story in the Quran 2:65 which the Jews turned into "monkeys and pigs".

Read the history and you will know that yesterday's Jews were bad predecessors and today's Jews are worse successors. They are killers of prophets and the scum of the earth. God hurled his curses and indignation on them and made them monkeys and pigs and worshippers [sic] of tyrants. These are the Jews, a continuous lineage of meanness, cunning, obstinacy, tyranny, evil, and corruption....May God's curses follow them until the Day of Judgement....Thus, they deserve the curse of God, His angels, and all people.

In 2007, Sudais prayed to God to "terminate" the Jews and has claimed that the Israelis aspired to tear down the al-Aqsa mosque and build their temple upon its ruins.

In 2020, Sudais changed his tone. In a sermon on Saudi state television, Sudais called for avoiding "passionate emotions and fiery enthusiasm" towards Jews, arguing the best way to persuade them towards Islam was to "treat them well". He pointed out that the prophet Muhammad was good to his Jewish neighbor. The sermon came just a few weeks after the UAE normalized relations with Israel.

=== Call for all-out war against Iran ===
On 31 March 2015, an audio recording of al-Sudais was circulated online, accompanied by a photo with a caption stating "Imam of the grand mosque in Mecca calls for all-out war against Shiites." In the recording al-Sudais called for an all-out war against the Shia:

Our war with Iran, say that out loud, is a war between Sunnis and Shiites. Our war with Iran...is truly sectarian. If it was not sectarian, we will make it sectarian... The Jews and cross [referring to Christians] I swear by Allah that they will have their days... The prophet said Rome will be conquered... Our disagreement with Rafidha [a derogatory term referring to Shia Muslims] will not be removed nor our suicide to fight them...as long as they are on the face of the earth...

In view of these statements by al-Sudais, Ahmed Abdul Hussein, the editor-in-chief of an Iraqi news agency, stated, "Remember the date 3/31/2015, the day the Shiite-Sunni war was announced. It will last more than crusade wars."

== Controversy ==
=== Antisemitism ===
Following his 2002 speech, al-Sudais has been described as an antisemite for publicly praying to God to 'terminate' the Jews, whom he called "the scum of humanity ... the rats of the world ... prophet killers ... pigs and monkeys", and as a result has been barred from conferences in the United States and been refused entry to Canada.

Al-Sudais has been listed as an example of theological antisemitism by the Anti-Defamation League, when he called curses down upon Jews and labeled them "scum of the earth" in his sermons.

The International Broadcasting Bureau also has reported the antisemitism of Sudais's April 2002 sermon.

In a May 2003 interview with NBC's Tim Russert, the foreign policy adviser to the Saudi crown prince, Adel al-Jubeir, confirmed Al-Sudais's statements, agreed that they were "clearly not right", and stated that he was reprimanded, but was still allowed to preach. He also said that "if he [Sudais] had a choice he would retract these words – he would not have said these words."

Al-Sudais has not only criticised Jews, but other non-Muslims, such as Hindus and Christians. John Ware on the BBC program Panorama entitled "A Question of Leadership" from August 21, 2005, cited Al-Sudais referring to Christians as "cross-worshippers" and Hindus as "idol worshippers". Ware pointed out the discrepancy between Sudais's sermons to Saudis with his speech to Western audiences.

The Muslim Council of Britain questioned the veracity of quotes given in the interview, calling them "deliberately garbled" and the program as a whole "deeply unfair". The council urged caution, and while condemning any form of antisemitic remarks, requested verification that these words were indeed spoken by al-Sudais. After a series of exchanges, the BBC's Panorama editor, Mike Robinson, posted a response to each of the Muslim Council's allegations, accusing them of "unwarranted and wildly inaccurate attacks" and "bad faith allegations".

In August 2009, the Board of Deputies of British Jews protested a visit by al-Sudais to Britain in which he gave lectures at several mosques and attended an event with Tory MP Tony Baldry. Baldry subsequently defended his decision to work with al-Sudais, stating that "If I had written a text of what a moderate Muslim would say, his would have been a word-perfect example."

== See also ==
- Saud al-Shuraim
- Saad al-Ghamdi
- Abdullah Awad al-Juhany
- Maheer al-Mu'aiqly
- Bandar Baleela
- Yasir al-Dawsari
