= Sulaiman Al-Alwan =

Saudi Arabian scholar

Imam Shaykh al-Islam Sulaiman ibn Nasir al-Alwan
- سليمان بن ناصر بن عبد الله العلوان

Personal life
- Born: Sulayman ibn Nasir ibn Abdillah al-Alwan; 1969 (age 56–57) Buraidah, Saudi Arabia
- Era: Modern
- Region: Middle East
- Main interest(s): Hadith, politics, Jihad
- Notable idea: Jihad
- Notable work: Forty Hadith Jihadiyyah - Sulaiman Al Alwan
- Other name: Abu Abdullah
- Occupation: Islamic scholar, Muhaddith, Allamah

Religious life
- Religion: Islam
- Denomination: Sunni
- Jurisprudence: Hanbali
- Creed: Athari
- Movement: Salafi, Jihad, Salafi Jihadism

Muslim leader
- Disciple of: Muhammad ibn Salih al-Uthaymin, Ibn Baz, Al-Shu'aybi
- Influenced by: Ahmad ibn Hanbal, Ibn Taymiyya, Hamoud al Aqla al Shuebi, Al-Uthaymin, Ibn Baz, Ibn Qayyim, Abdul-Rahman bin Nasir al-Barrak, Muhammad ibn Abd al-Wahhab
- Influenced: Abdullah al-Muhaysini, Abd al-Aziz al-Tarifi

Shaykh Sulaiman al-Alwan (Arabic: سليمان العلوان) is a Saudi Arabian Islamic scholar and a 'Muhaddith' (hadith specialist). Sulaymān bin Nāṣir bin ʿAbdillāh al-ʿAlwān, born 1969) is a Saudi Islamic scholar and Salafist preacher. He is known to have memorised the Nine Major Books of Hadith. At a young age, he memorised a lot of texts in different Islamic sciences alongside the explanations of these texts.

== Fatwa ==
In 2000, he issued a Fatwa endorsing the use of suicide bombings against Israel, and in 2001 he supported the destruction of the Buddhas of Bamiyan by the Taliban. Al-Alwan's mosque in Al-Qassim Province was criticised by moderate Islamic scholars as a "terrorist factory". Among his students was Abdulaziz al-Omari, one of the plane hijackers in the September 11 attacks. After the September 11 attacks, al-Alwan issued two fatwas (21 September 2001 and 19 October 2001), in which he declared that any Muslim who supported the Americans in Afghanistan was a disbeliever, and called on all Muslims to support the Afghans and Taliban by any means, including jihad. In January 2002, Alwan and two other radical Saudi clerics, Hamoud al-Aqla al-Shuebi and Ali al-Khudair, wrote a letter to Taliban leader Mullah Omar praising him and referred to him as the Commander of the faithful.

== Prison ==
On 31 March 2003, 11 days after the start of the Iraq War, al-Alwan published an open letter in which he called on the Iraqi people to fight the American soldiers and use suicide bombings against them. On 28 April 2004, Saudi authorities arrested al-Alwan and after being held for nine years without trial, he was released on 5 December 2012.

In October 2013, Alwan was sentenced to a 15-year prison term; charges included questioning the legitimacy of the country's rulers. He was due to be released in 2019.

== See also ==
- Nasir al-Fahd
- Ali al-Khudair
- Abd al-Aziz al-Tarifi
