= Hani al-Sibai =

Egyptian terrorist

- Born: 1961 (age 63–64)
- Other names: Arabic: هاني السباعي; Hani Mohammed Yusuf al-Siba'i; هاني محمد يوسف السباعي; Hani al-Said al-Siba'i Yusuf; هاني السيد السباعي يوسف
- Known for: Convicted of terrorism in absentia

Hani Mohammed Yusuf al-Siba'i (هاني محمد يوسف السباعي) (born 1 March 1961 in Qaylubiyah, Egypt) is an Egyptian Islamic scholar who was a member of Egyptian Islamic Jihad and now lives in London as a political refugee. Efforts to deport him have failed. He is a supporter of al-Qaeda and is used as a scholarly reference by the movement. The leader of al-Qaeda, Ayman al-Zawahiri, listed him as one of four scholars that Muslims worldwide should follow, alongside Abu Muhammad al-Maqdisi, Abu Qatada and Dr. Tariq Abdelhaleem.

== Biography ==
Al-Siba'i fought as part of the mujahideen in the Soviet–Afghan War according to his own autobiography.

Al-Siba'i arrived in Britain in 1994 claiming that he had been tortured by the Egyptian police because he represented Islamist clients. His claim for asylum was rejected in 1998 and he was later arrested on terrorism charges but the charges were dropped.

He sought and was granted refugee status in the United Kingdom prior to his 1998 arrest in connection with Operation Challenge. He was accused of membership in the terrorist group Egyptian Islamic Jihad.

It was his defence of Islamists, that got him into trouble with the Egyptian government. Egyptian prosecutors were able to prove in court that he was one of the fourteen members of the shura of Egyptian Islamic Jihad. Egyptian authorities convicted him in absentia in the 1999 case of the returnees from Albania and sentenced him to 15 years imprisonment.

Al-Siba'i has appeared on Arab TV stations including al-Jazeera where, on the day after the July 7 bombings in London, he expressed his support for the September 11 attacks.

In September 2005, he was one of seven Egyptians whose names were added to the UN 1267 Committee's list of banned individuals. A few days later he was added to the list of Specially Designated Nationals maintained by the US Treasury Office of Foreign Assets Control, as a supporter of al-Qaeda or an allied group.

In 2009 and 2010, al-Seba'i was, along with others subject to Treasury Control Orders, a participant in HM Treasury v Ahmed. Their joint victory in the Supreme Court forced the government of Gordon Brown to create the Terrorist Asset-Freezing (Temporary Provisions) Act 2010. The court deemed the TCOs, which had been issued as the result of a UN directive, to be ultra vires, because the executive could not delegate powers to the UN (later to be returned in the directive) which it had not been granted by Parliament.

In 2013, an organiser of Ansar al-Sharia (Tunisia) cited al-Siba'i as one of five influential thinkers from whom the terrorists in Tunisia obtain their encouragement: "Sheikh Hani Sabahi is also respected in our movement. We have a steady contact with him and he is very sympathetic to our experience."

In March 2015, Hani al-Seba'i was cut off from a live television interview with Lebanese reporter Rima Karaki, after he told her to "shut up" and said "It's beneath me to be interviewed by you. You are a woman who . . ." The interview went viral shortly after being released causing public outrage over his sexist remark. The video was viewed by more than five million viewers on YouTube within a week.

He receives financial benefits from the British Government.

Abdullah al Muhaysini, Hani al-Sibai, Abu Qatada, and Abdurazak al Mahdi were all featured in a Turkistan Islamic Party in Syria video.

Hani al-Siba'i cited Justin McCarthy's work while engaging in Armenian Genocide denial. Hani al-Sibai claimed America committed atrocities and genocide against Native Americans and said Trump resembles all American Presidents in character.

Al-Siba'i claimed that antagonism against Muslim, Ottoman Turks is the reason for serving Turkey during Christmas in England, and also claimed that pariahs and drug dealers made up most of the Turkish population in Europe in his defense of Islamism and attacks on Atatürk's secularism.

Brexit's impact was commented on by al-Sibai who welcomed the potential dissolution of the EU despite what he described as "right-wingers" and "racists" leading Brexit.

Tariq Abdelhaleem declared liberals and secularists as "infidels" and called for them to be killed, in his hopes of accelerate a violent clash between Islamists and secularists and liberals. His work was published by jihadist fugitive Hani al-Siba'i who is wanted in Egypt. Hani al-Sibai wrote an article defending Tariq Abdul Haleem from criticism. Tariq Abdul Haleem issued a joint statement with Hani al-Siba’i on ISIS in 2014.

Abdul Razzaq al-Mahdi, Nabil Al-Awadi, Tariq Abdelhaleem, and Hani al-Siba'i who are linked to Al-Qaeda, in addition to others like Adnan al-Aroor, Abd Al-Aziz Al-Fawzan, Mohamad al-Arefe, Abdul Rahman Al-Sudais, Abdul-Aziz ibn Abdullah Al Shaykh and others were included on a death list by ISIS.
