= Adnan al-Arur =

Salafi Cleric from Hama, Syria

- Born: 1948 (age 77–78) CE / 1368 AH; Hama, Syria
- Occupations: Scientific director for research and publishing in Riyadh and Salafi cleric
- Children: 11 (3 girls and 8 boys)
- Website: www.islamwasat.com

Shaykh Adnan Muhammad al-Arur (Arabic: الشيخ عدنان محمد العرعور, born 1948) is a Sunni Muslim scholar from Hama, Syria. He is one of the symbolic figures of the anti-government Syrian uprising.

Al-Aroor appears regularly on TV stations in Saudi Arabia, including the widely watched satellite channel al-Safa, where he is known for his programs criticizing non-Salafi Islamic groups fighting against the government. He became widely known and promoted after the start of the Syrian Revolution as the non-official face of the anti-government movement in Syria. With a net worth of 1.8 million dollars, he favors arming the Syrian opposition and a foreign military intervention.

According to The Economist: "Those who tuned in to Mr Arour's weekly show were attracted less by his Sunni triumphalism than by his theatrical appeals for all Syrians to rise and fight, something opposition intellectuals in exile neglected to do. But as Syria's misery has ground on, sectarian fault lines have inexorably widened. Mr Arour's views, once widely dismissed as extreme, now look closer to the terrorism and extremism, at least among the three-quarters of Syrians who are non-Sunni". Aroor fled Syria after losing support due to his extremist Salafist views which promoted sectarian hatred and genocide. After the Sunni rebels conquered Damascus, he has returned to Syria ending his 53 years of exile, according to Zahid Akhtar from DOAM- Documenting Oppression Against Muslims.

In 2017, He was included along with Yusuf al-Qaradawi, Abdulaziz Al al-Sheikh, Tariq Abdelhaleem, Abdul-Razzaq al-Mahdi, Hani al-Sibai, Abdul-Rahman al-Sudais, Abd Al-Aziz Al-Fawzan, Nabil al-Awadi, Muhammad al-'Arifi, and others on a death list by ISIS.
