= Al-Shu'aybi =

Saudi Islamic scholar

Hamoud al-Aqla Al-Shu'aybi

Personal life
- Education: Imam Muhammad ibn Saud Islamic University
- Occupation: University professor

Religious life
- Religion: Islam
- Denomination: Sunni
- Creed: Athari
- Movement: Salafi

Muslim leader
- Influenced by: Muhammad ibn Abd al-Wahhab, Ibn Taymiyya, Muhammad ibn Ibrahim Al ash-Sheikh, Ibn Baz

Hamoud al-Aqla (Arabic: حمود العقلاء; died late 2001), commonly known as Shaykh al-Shu'aybi (Arabic: الشعيبي, romanized: al-Shuʿaybī) was a Saudi-born Islamic scholar.

== Views ==
He has been seen as a radical element since at least 1994 when he was quoted by Osama bin Laden in his Open Letter to Bin Baz on the Invalidity of his Fatwa on Peace with the Jews, and several weeks after the Invasion of Afghanistan. Al-Shu'aybi authored a book The Preferred View on the Ruling of Asking the Infidels for Help, that is said (by ) to have been "seminal in convincing a generation they should stand against—and hate—the encroachments of the West."

He supported the September 11 attacks and issued a Fatwa praising the Taliban government shortly after their destruction of the Buddha sculptures in Bamiyan for creating "the only country in the world in which there are no man-made laws".

The CIA accused many Guantanamo detainee of obeying his fatwa and used it to torture them without any evidence.

== Legacy ==
Some students of al-Shuaybi are based out of the very conservative city of Buraydah, capital of al-Qasim Province in Saudi Arabia. The most important of his students are Nasir al-Fahd, Ali al-Khudair, Hamoud al-Khaldi, and Sulaiman al-Alwan. As of 2010, the four had been in prison since 2003, following the May 2003 suicide bombings of residential compounds in Riyadh that killed 34 people, and which they reportedly supported. The school helped to legitimize the jihadi movement's fight against the Saudi state and aided in the recruitment of new supporters when the movement began to emerge in Saudi Arabia in late-1999 and early-2000.
