= Institute of Islamic and Arabic Sciences in America =

Islamic educational institution in Virginia, United States

Institute of Islamic and Arabic Sciences in America is the Virginia-based American satellite campus of Saudi Arabia's Imam Muhammad ibn Saud Islamic University.

== Background ==
The Institute of Islamic and Arabic Sciences in America (IIASA) was established in 1988 as a nonprofit organization in Fairfax, Virginia. It is a satellite of Imam Muhammad ibn Saud Islamic University in Riyadh, Saudi Arabia.

IIASA is funded by, and serves as an arm of, the Saudi embassy's Religious Affairs Department. The institute's Board Chairman is the former Saudi ambassador to America (from 1983 to 2005), Prince Bandar Bin Sultan.

On December 22, 2003, Senator Charles Grassley of the Senate Finance Committee included IIASA in a list of U.S.-based, Saudi-established nonprofits and charities suspected of laundering funds used for terrorism.

In January 2005 the US State Department revoked the diplomatic visas of 16 staffers at the IIASA. According to U.S. and Saudi officials it was "part of the attempt" by the US and Saudi Arabia "to curb the spread of extremist Islamic rhetoric" in the US and "ensure that all Saudi Embassy employees are engaged in legitimate diplomatic activity."

Controversial Saudi cleric and professor at Imam Muhammad ibn Saud Islamic University, Abd Al-Aziz Fawzan Al-Fawzan, taught at IIASA for a while.
