= Abu Muhammad al-Tahawi =

Abd al-Qadir Shahada, known as Abu Muhammad al-Tahawi, is a Jordanian Islamic scholar who is among the leaders of the Salafi movement in Jordan.

== Biography ==
He is from Irbid.

He was arrested on April 15, 2011, during the 2011–12 Jordanian protests, during which he had attended a protest in Zarqa. He was later released.

On 30 October 2012, he told the BBC that "jihad in Syria is obligatory for any able Muslim in order to help his brothers there."

While in prison in September 2013, Tahawi criticized the Jordanian legal system. In a letter, he told the Al-Nour Party in Egypt to not “trade God’s law for the law of the world."

Shortly after Abu Muhammad al-Maqdisi was released from prison in June 2014 he sharply criticized the Islamic State. Abu Muhammad al-Tahawi expressed neutral position on dispute between Nusra Front and Islamic State.

But on September 30, 2014, while they were both imprisoned, he and Abu Muhammad al-Maqdisi issued a statement calling on Abu Qatada to cease his criticism of the Islamic State.
