= Rola Bahnam =

Iraqi television presenter

Rola Bahnam (Arabic: رولا بهنام) or often spelt Rula Bahnam, is a Lebanese TV presenter, Media personality and Model of Iraqi descent. She is mostly known for working in Future TV and now presenting the TV Show "Isma Wi Naseeb" "Perfect Bride" on LBC.

== Early life ==
Rola was born in Mosul to an Iraqi father and a Lebanese mother. She holds a degree in architecture. She is married to a Businessman named Jaber Jaafar and has a son and a daughter, Karim and Yasmine. She holds three nationalities: Iraqi, Lebanese, and British.

According to Lebanese news sources, Rola Bahnam is the owner of a property in the coastal town Amsheet being built over a protected seal cave since 2022. The legally contested and publicly protested construction is accused to damage the integrity of the cave threatening the maritime life inhabiting it. Construction continues despite the protests and contested legality of the project.

== Career ==
Bahnam worked as a model and participated once with the Lebanese girl band, The 4 Cats in their first song, "Aachra, Hdaach, Tnaach", after which she left the team in 1998. She began her career in 1998 on Future TV through "Elite Model Look", a TV program for discovering fashion models and represented more like "Open Night" with Rima Karaki and Rima Maktabi, then "Fashion", after which "Rola On Air", and "Song Number One" in 2004. After a long absence from television, she returned with the TV program "Qisma W Naseeb" and hosted its first season on the screen of LBC in 2007 then "Design Magazine" program specialized in the world of architecture and designs on the Abu Dhabi Channel in 2010.
