= Al-Tahawi (surname) =

Al-Tahawi (Arabic: الطحاوي or الطحاوى) is an Arabic surname. Notable people with the surname include:

- Al-Tahawi (853–933), Egyptian Islamic jurist
- Abu Muhammad al-Tahawi (fl. 2011–2014), Jordanian Islamic scholar
- Miral al-Tahawy (fl. 1995), Egyptian novelist
- Mona Eltahawy (born 1967), Egyptian-American journalist
