= Abd Al-Aziz Fawzan Al-Fawzan =

Saudi Arabian scholar and author

Abd Al-Aziz Al-Fawzan

Personal life
- Born: 1964 (age 61–62) Saudi Arabia
- Education: Imam Muhammad ibn Saud Islamic University
- Other name: Abd Al-Aziz Fawzan Al-Fawzan

Religious life
- Religion: Islam
- Denomination: Sunni
- Jurisprudence: Hanbali
- Creed: Athari
- Movement: Salafism

Muslim leader
- Influenced by: Saleh al-Fawzan

Abd Al-Aziz Fawzan Al-Fawzan (Arabic: عبد العزيز فوزان الفوزان, romanized: ʻAbd Al-ʻAzīz Fawzān Al-Fawzān) is an Islamic scholar and author in Saudi Arabia. He is also known as Abd Al-Aziz Al-Fawzan or Abd al-Aziz b. Fawzan al-Fawzan.

== Background and education ==
He is a Saudi Professor of Islamic Law at Imam Muhammad ibn Saud Islamic University and a member of the Teacher's Board, al-Imam University. In the past, he taught at the Institute of Islamic and Arabic Sciences in America (IIASA).

== Views ==
Al-Fawzan speaks frequently on Saudi TV, and has reportedly been highly critical of Christianity and the United States.

In 2005, of Christians he has reportedly said, "Someone who denies Allah, worships Christ, son of Mary, and claims that God is one third of a trinity – so you like these things he says and does? Don’t you hate the faith of such a polytheist who says God is one third of a trinity, or who worships Christ, son of Mary?" He further commented that Muslims should have positive hatred, which is to feel compassion and mercy and to try to help people convert to Islam and submit to one god.

In October 2008, on America and the 2008 financial crisis, he said, "America is collapsing, according to the same scenario of the Russian collapse."

== Reception ==
In 2017, He was included along with Yusuf al-Qaradawi, Abdulaziz Al al-Sheikh, Adnan al-Arur, Tariq Abdelhaleem, Abdul-Razzaq al-Mahdi, Hani al-Sibai, Abdul-Rahman al-Sudais, Nabil al-Awadi, Muhammad al-'Arifi, and others on a death list by ISIS.
