= Ali al-Khudair =

Saudi Arabian thinker and scholar

Shaykh Ali al-Khudayr
- علي بن خضير بن فهد الخضير

Personal life
- Born: Ali ibn Khudayr ibn Fahd al-Khudayr; 1954 (age 71–72) Riyadh, Saudi Arabia
- Era: Modern
- Main interest(s): Hadith, politics, Jihad
- Notable idea: Jihad
- Occupation: Islamic scholar, Allamah

Religious life
- Religion: Islam
- Denomination: Sunni
- Jurisprudence: Hanbali
- Creed: Athari
- Movement: Salafi, Jihad, Salafi Jihadism

Muslim leader
- Disciple of: Muhammad ibn Salih al-Uthaymin, Al-Shu'aybi
- Influenced by: Ahmad ibn Hanbal, Ibn Taymiyya, Hamoud al Aqla al Shuebi, Al-Uthaymin, Ibn Baz, Ibn Qayyim, Abdul-Rahman bin Nasir al-Barrak, Muhammad ibn Abd al-Wahhab
- Influenced: Yusuf al-Ayiri

Ali al-Khudair (Arabic: علي بن خضير بن فهد الخضير, romanized: 'Alī ibn Khuḍayr ibn Fahd al-Khuḍayr; 1954) is a Saudi Islamic scholar who has been held in detention since May 2003. He has been called a member of the "al-Shu'aybi school", named after his teacher, Hamad b. Uqala' al-Shu'aybi.

== Early life and education ==
Ali al-Khudair was born in Riyadh, Saudi Arabia, in the year of 1374 Hijri, corresponding to 1954. He began his pursuit of Islamic knowledge during his high school years, starting with the memorization and recitation of the Qur'an under the supervision of the local scholar Abdul Ra'uf al-Hannawi. Early mentors to al-Khudair during this time included Ali ibn Abdullah al-Jardan and Muhammed al-Muheezi. Al-Muheezi was a prominent judge dating back to the era of Grand Mufti Muhammed ibn Ibrahim Al ash-Sheikh. After completing his secondary education, he enrolled in the Imam Muhammed ibn Saud Islamic University in Riyadh, where he graduated from the Faculty of Usul ad-Din in 1403 AH (c. 1983 CE).

After graduating, he began his full-time religious studies under Hamud ibn Uqla al-Shu'aybi, who he had studied theological subjects such as Tawhid and Aqidah intensely under him until his death in 2001. He additionally studied Fiqh under Muhammad ibn Saleh al-Uthaymin from 1400 AH to 1403 AH (c. 1979 - 1982 CE). He also studied Nahw, Hadith and al-Fara'idh (Islamic inheritance law) under Muhammed ibn Salih al-Mansur from 1409 AH to 1413 AH (c. 1988 to 1992). He furthermore sought knowledge under Muhammed Sulayman al-Aleet, and studied classical texts on Islamic asceticism, including Kitab az-Zuhud by Imam Waki and al-Wara' by Ahmed ibn Hanbal.

Al-Khudair began delivering lectures and lessons in Saudi mosques in 1405 AH (c. 1985 CE), initially focusing on Hadith terminology. In 1992, he authored a letter of protest to the Amir of the al-Qasim region, objecting to the organization of a large sporting event in Buraydah. He had also signed the 'Memorandum of Advice' alongside al-Shu'aybi, Salman al-Ouda and Safar al-Hawali. After the arrest of al-Ouda in September 1994, al-Khudair escalated his opposition by organising a group called the "Society for the Defense of the Muslim Scholars, where he began distributing dissident material produced by the Committee for the Defence of Legitimate Rights. These activities ultimately led to his arrest and imprisonment in October 1994. During his imprisonment, al-Khudair met and became acquainted with Nasir al-Fahd.

== Views ==
After being freed in 1998, Ali al-Khudair had emerged as "one of the most prominent radical sheikhs in Burayda", and had issued fatwas against several Saudi Arabian thinkers, among them Turki al-Hamad, Mansour al-Naqeedan and Abdullah Abusamh declaring them as infidel.

His taped sermons and religious decrees are reported to have influenced many young people in Saudi Arabia.

After the 9/11 attacks on New York and Washington DC, he issued a fatwa calling on his followers to rejoice in the attacks and listed American "crimes" that justified the attacks "killing and displacing Muslims, aiding the Muslims' enemies against them, spreading secularism, forcefully imposing blasphemy on peoples and states, and persecuting the mujahideen."

== Arrest and Imprisonment ==
In February 2003, al-Khudair went into hiding after being placed on a wanted list by Saudi authorities. On May 27, 2003, he was arrested by Saudi security forces during a raid on a residential building in Medina alongside two prominent scholars, Nasir al-Fahd and Ahmad al-Khalidi. The three had been hiding in Medina while communicating with their supporters on the internet for three months.

Days after his arrest, an Islamist Web site posted a message from Osama bin Laden warning the Saudi government not to harm the cleric. Bin Laden described al-Khudair as "our most prominent supporter" and according to Mohamad Bazzi, cautioned that if he was hurt, Al-Qaeda's response would be "as great as the sheikh’s high standing with us".

According to Ain-al-Yaqeen, in November 2003 interview with Saudi television, al-Khudair "recanted and condemned the suicide bombings which took place in Riyadh" and withdrew the fatwas he had issued declaring Turki al-Hamad, Mansour al-Naqeedan and Abdullah Abusamh infidels, which was later proven to be false.
