= Karaki =

Karaki or al-Karaki is an Arabic surname. Notable people with the surname include:

- Ali Karaki (1967–2024), Lebanese militant
- Khaled Al-Karaki (born 1946), Jordanian author, poet, academic and politician
- Mirza Mohammad Karaki (fl. 17th century), Iranian cleric and statesman
- Rima Karaki, Lebanese news anchor
