= Abdul Razzaq al-Mahdi =

Syrian Islamist cleric (born 1961)

Abdul-Razzaq bin Ghalib al-Mahdi
- عبد الرزاق بن غالب المهدي

Personal life
- Born: 1961 (age 64–65) Al-Salihiyah, Damascus, Syria
- Website: http://abderrazakalmahdi.com/ (offline)

Religious life
- Religion: Sunni Islam

Senior posting
- Post: Religious cleric in Tahrir al-Sham (former); Specializes in Hadith

Abdul-Razzaq al-Mahdi (Arabic: عبد الزراق المهدي), is a Syrian Islamist cleric who was actively involved fighting in the Syrian Civil War against the Ba'athist government. He originates from Damascus's Al-Salihiyah district and was born in 1961.

== Study and graduation ==
He began studying Islamic Sciences in 1977 in the al-Fathu’l Islami institution in Damascus, where his teachers included Abdur Razzaq al-Halabi, the mufti of Hanafis. He also studied under Abdul Qader Arnaout.

He briefly left Syria for Tunisia, where he preached and taught. After the outbreak of the Syrian Civil War he returned to Syria to support fighters opposing the government.

A fatwa allowing abandoned homes to be seized was withdrawn by Abdulrazzaq al Mahdi. A video was posted of Abdul Razzaq al Mahdi pleading for Muslims to intervene against what he called were "cursed Shiite rafidha" in December 2016 during the Battle of Aleppo.

After the death of Muhammad Surur, Abdul Razzaq al-Mahdi released condolences upon him and commented on his influence. Al Mahdi posted a video calling for unity under the leadership of Islamic clerics.

In an article published in the 19th edition of the Turkistan Islamic Party's magazine "Islamic Turkistan", Abdurazak al Mahdi praised Sultan Satuq Bughra Khan's conversion to Islam and Qutayba bin Muslim's conquest.

Abdullah al Muhaysini, Hani al Siba'ee, Abu Qatada, and Abdurazak al Mahdi were all featured in a Turkistan Islamic Party video.

The Turkistan Islamic Party in Syria released "Blessed Are the Strangers #6" featuring a speech by Hasan Mahsum, as well as by Army of Conquest leader Abdullah al-Muhaysini and fellow Abdul Razzaq al Mahdi.

Doğu Türkistan Bülteni Haber Ajansı reported that the Turkistan Islamic Party was praised by Abu Qatada along with Abdul Razzaq al Mahdi, Maqdisi, Muhaysini and Zawahiri.

Abdul Razzaq al-Mahdi and Abdullah al-Muhaysini asked Muslims with money to aid the cause of the Uyghur Turkistan Islamic Party and praised the Uyghur foreign fighters for their role in the Syrian Civil War fighting against the Syrian government.

Muhaysini, Abu Taher Al Hamawi, and Abdelrazzak Mehdi worked on the formation of the group Hay'at Tahrir al-Sham. They are members of the group and appeared in its founding declaration. However some months later on 8 March 2017 Abdul Razzaq al-Mahdi announced his split from the group in his official Telegram channel as he had not been able to hinder some injustices and did thus not wish to take share in the responsibility. This came in the wake of the Rebel infighting in South Idlib and Northern Hama between Tahrir al-Sham and Liwa al-Aqsa, an ISIS affiliate left over from the late Jund al-Aqsa movement after its fusion. Liwa al-Aqsa had been accused of harassing other groups and kidnapping people as they considered most groups to be apostates, which emanated from their extreme views in takfir. Since his split from the group, al-Mahdi continues his Islamic preaching activities independently and hosts some programs along with answering jurisprudential (relating fiqh - the permissibility or prohibition of actions) questions of his followers online through Telegram.

Abdul Razzaq al-Mahdi along with Nabil Al-Awadi, Tariq Abdelhaleem, and Hani al-Sibai, in addition to others like Adnan al-Aroor, Abd Al-Aziz Al-Fawzan, Mohamad al-Arefe, Abdul Rahman Al-Sudais, Abdul-Aziz ibn Abdullah Al Shaykh and others were included on a death list by ISIS.

== Works ==
Activities of the Abdul Razzaq al-Mahdı in revising books were concentrated on the subject of Hadith, particularly the fields of Takhrij (researching variants of the hadith), Tashih (authentifying hadiths) and Tadyif (classifying to be “weak”).

=== Tafsir ===
- Tafsiru’l Qurani’l Azim by Ibn Kathir, 5 volumes
- Tafsiru’l Qurtubi, al-Jami’ li’l-Ahkami’l Quran, 10 volumes
- Tafsiru’sh Shawkani, Fathu’l Qadir; 5 volumes
- Ahkamu’l Quran by Ibn al-Arabi; 4 volumes
- Tafsiru’l Baghawi; 5 volumes
- Tafsiru’l Kashaf by Zamahshari; 5 volumes, including an Appendix
- al-Bahru’l Muhit by Abu Hayyan; 8 volumes
- at-Tashīl by Ibn Juzayy; 2 volumes
- Adwau’l Bayan by al Shanqiti
- Fathul Bayan by Sadiq Hasan Khan

=== Islamic sciences ===
- at-Tamhid by Ibn Abdilbarr
- Fathul Qadir by Ibn Humām; 5 volumes [Hanafi fiqh]
- al-Lubāb; 3 volumes [Hanafi fiqh]
- al-Uddah Sharhul 'Umdah
- ar-Rawdul Murabba’
- Bidāyatul Mujtahid by Ibn Rushd (Averroes)
- al-I’tisam by al-Shātibi
- Fathul Majid
- Shariah by Ajuri
- Tarikhul Madina by Ibn an-Najjar
- Zadul Ma’ad by Ibn Qayyim
- Talbisu Iblis by Ibn Jawzi
- Mukthasar Zadul Ma’ād and Mukhtasar as-Sīrah by Muhammad ibn Abdulwahhab

=== Miscellaneous ===
- Kitabu'l Adhkar by an-Nawawī
- ar-Rihlatu fi talabil hadith by al-Khatīb al-Baghdadi
- al-Khatim by al-Bayhaqī with an introduction
- Muwatta; 4 volumes revision with a lengthy and detailed takhrij of the hadiths, especially those concerning balaaghah, mursal ones and mawquf hadiths considered marfu' along with a beneficent commentary. It has not been printed later.
