= Abd al-Aziz al-Tarifi =

Saudi Arabian Islamic scholar (born 1976)

Abdulaziz al-Tarifi
- عبد العزيز الطريفي
- Title: Allama, Muhaddith

Personal life
- Born: 29 November 1976 (age 49) Kuwait
- Education: Imam Muhammad ibn Saud Islamic University

Religious life
- Religion: Islam
- Denomination: Sunni
- Jurisprudence: Hanbali
- Creed: Athari
- Movement: Salafism

Muslim leader
- Influenced by: Ahmad bin Hanbal, Ibn Taymiyya, Ibn al-Qayyim, Muhammad Ibn Abd al-Wahhab, Ibn Baz, Ibn Uthaymin, Abdul-Rahman al-Barrak

Abdulaziz al-Tarifi (Arabic: عبد العزيز بن مرزوق الطريفي, romanized: ʿAbd al-ʿAzīz bin Marzūq aṭ-Ṭarīfī; born 29 November 1976) is a Saudi Arabian Islamic scholar who is recognized for his knowledge in Hadith and Fiqh. He is particularly known for his ability to recall from memory a hadith from the major hadith collections.

== Biography ==
Abdulaziz Al-Tarefe was born 29 November 1976, (7/12/1396 AH) in Kuwait. As a child, he moved between Kuwait and Mosul.

He settled in the Saudi capital, Riyadh.

== Education ==
Sheikh Abdul Aziz Al-Tarefe (also called as 'Abdul 'Aziz At-Turaifi) began memorising Islamic texts at the age of 13. Al-Tarefe finished his university studies at the College of Sharia at Imam Muhammad bin Saud Islamic University in the city of Riyadh.

== Occupation ==
Sheikh Tarefe was a researcher for the Ministry of the Islamic Affairs, then the director of Studies and Research in the Center for Research and Studies, and then an Islamic researcher in the same center.

== Arrest ==
He was arrested in April 2016, though the reason for his arrest is still not fully known. As of August 2026 he is still detained.
