= Sumaya Alnasser =

Saudi Arabian businesswoman

- Born: June 23, 1982 (age 44); Riyadh, KSA
- Education: Imam Mohammad Ibn Saud Islamic University
- Occupations: life and career coach; businesswoman
- Years active: 2003–present
- Website: sumaya369.net

Sumaya Alnasser (Arabic: سمية الناصر; born 1982) is a Saudi Arabian writer, thinker, and businesswoman, specializing in self-development and personal growth. With several published works to her name, she has conducted workshops and delivered lectures designed to enhance personal skills and foster self-awareness.

== Early life and education ==
Alnasser was born in Riyadh with congenital hip dysplasia. She graduated from Imam Mohammad Ibn Saud Islamic University, Riyadh, Saudi Arabia, in 2011 with a bachelor's degree and later received her Ph.D. in theology from the same institute in 2014. She began reading self-help books at the age of 12, after a childhood made difficult by frequent hospital visits and surgeries.

== Career ==
Alnasser has a Ph.D. in theology from Imam Mohammad Ibn Saud Islamic University, Riyadh, Saudi Arabia. She began coaching in 2003 and has since authored books and articles. Over the years, she has trained more than 200,000 people and delivered more than 12,000 hours of coaching.

Alnasser founded Sumaya369, a life and wellness coaching program, in 2016.

In 2018, Alnasser was chosen by the global organization Peace Without Borders to be the first Saudi ambassador for peace. She was chosen by Forbes as one of the 100 most influential women in the Middle East in 2018 by Forbes.

The same year, she launched the first-ever Arabic-guided Meditation CD, The Back Door, which features fourteen tracks focused on different topics.

== Affiliations, awards, and achievements ==
- Member of the International Coaching Federation (IFC)
- Presented the first Arabic meditation audio CD available on iTunes, Google Play, and Amazon.
- Won the Bama International Award in 2018 for being the most influential humanitarian figure.
- Presenter of the radio program Why? on Panorama FM.
- Member of the Arab Federation for Training
- Received award and honor of the Sayidaty Award for Excellence and Creativity in its fourth session under the auspices of Prince Saud bin Nayef bin Abdulaziz, Governor of the Eastern Province.

== Books ==
Sumaya has published around 100 books.

- The Surgeon of Love.
- Inner Peace
- What have you done.
- He Talked to Me and Said.
- How to Master the Game of Life.
- He Talked to Me and Said II.
- How to Master the Game of Life.
- 90 Secrets That Will Make You Feel at Peace.
- Stop.. Don’t Worry.
- He Told Me.
- Do it.
- Stay Positive.

== Personal life ==
Alnasser currently resides in Los Angeles.
