= One Day in the Haram =

2017 Saudi documentary film by Abrar Hussain

- One Day in the Haram Official Film Poster
- Directed by: Abrar Hussain
- Written by: Abrar Hussain
- Produced by: Abdululeh Al Ahmary
- Cinematography: Abrar Hussain
- Edited by: Abdullah Alharazy
- Music by: Abdullah Rolle
- Production company: Arabia Pictures
- Release date: September 2017
- Running time: 85 minutes
- Country: Saudi Arabia
- Language: English/Arabic
- Budget: $266,652

One Day in the Haram is a 2017 feature length documentary film about the Haram in Makkah. The film was produced as a collaboration between Arabia Pictures and Al Reasah Haramin. For the first time in history, witness the inner workings of the Haram, as seen through the eyes of the workers, over a full day period. Director Abrar Hussain spent over a year researching different aspects of the Haram, a place so revered that non-Muslims are forbidden from even setting foot in it, to bring a complete vision of the workings of the Haram.

== Background ==
In an interview with Twasul, Executive Producer Abdululeh Al Ahmary said that the work came at the "initiative of the Custodians of the Two Holy Mosques, specifically by its president, Dr. Abdul Rahman Al-Sudais, which aims to raise awareness of the modern Haram, and to spread the true image of Muslims, their culture, and the definition of the Holiest place on Earth". Al Ahamary continues, "The aim of this work is also to show dedication and faith, in addition to instilling peace in the hearts of the viewers of the film."

The film was written and directed by Abrar Hussain, a British film producer. Previously a Series Producer at Islam Channel, Hussain directed and produced the popular returning TV shows Model Mosque (2007) and Faith Off (2008). Hussain presented the final of Model Mosque at the Global Peace and Unity (GPU) event in 2007, in-front of a live audience of 30,000 people. Judges on the Model Mosque show included Salma Yaqoob and Iqbal Saccranie. Both Model Mosque and Faith Off were positively received by the mainstream media, with BBC One, The Guardian, and ABC News Australia, reporting positively on the show.

Hussain began the pre-preproduction on One Day in the Haram in June 2015. Initial research included working closely with the Haram media department Al-Reasah Haramain. In an interview with Arab News, Hussain said he "wants to show how successfully the mosque is run, how organized its departments are, and how seriously its workers take their jobs". As part of the research Hussain conducted detailed analysis of 60 different departments within the Haram, and interviews many of the employees of these departments, to ascertain which departments and employees would be the best fit for the film.

== Synopsis ==
One Day in the Haram is a film about the Haram, told through the eyes of the workers. The workers represent the human face of the Haram, and the film explores the work they do as well as the spiritual motivation of the employees. Hussain organised the film across the five daily prayers (Fajr, Dhur, Asr, Magrib and Isha) focusing on the jobs carried out by different departments of the Haram within these time frames.

Key scenes include a focus on the social media of the haram, the cleaning department, the Imams, ZamZam water, religious affairs, maintenance, IT department, and the Kiswah cloth.

The film is introduced by the president of the Custodians of the Two Holy Mosques, Dr. Abdul Rahman Al-Sudais.

== Production ==
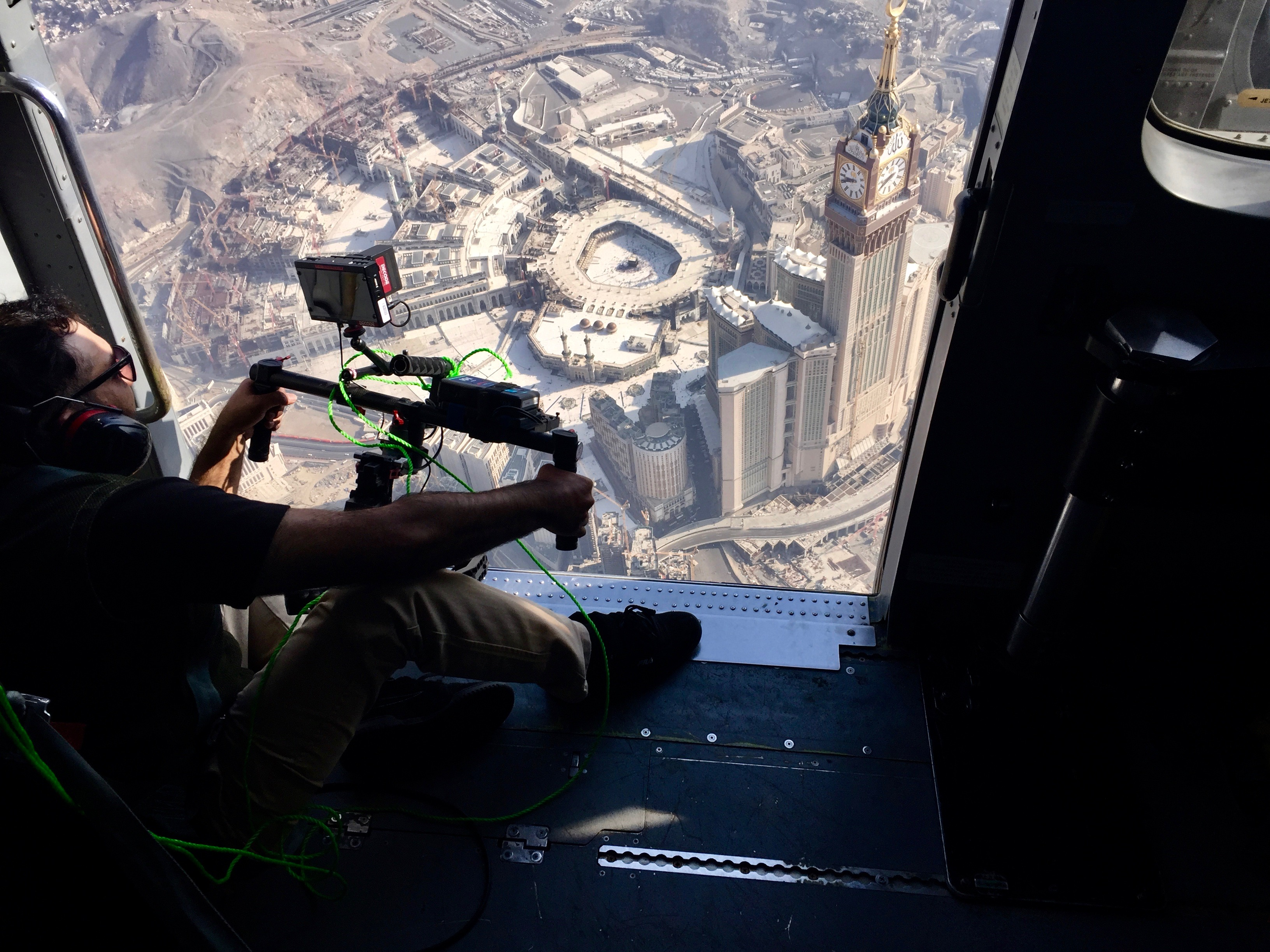
Director, Abrar Hussain, filming the documentary One Day in the Haram from a helicopter

The production crew for One Day in the Haram consisted of two camera units and 25 crew members overall. The film was shot on the Arri Alexa Mini and a mixture of Fujinon zoom lenses and Zeiss CP2 prime lenses. The film was shot at 4K resolution, with many sequences filmed in slow motion at 200 FPS.

As well as the ground filming the production obtained permissions for four helicopter flights over Makkah airspace. The film also featured low flying drone filming, using the DJI Matrice 600 and the DJI Inspire.

== See also ==
- List of Islamic films
