= Nasir al-Fahd =

Saudi Arabian Islamic scholar

Sheikh Nasir al-Fahd
- ناصر الفهد

Personal life
- Born: Naser bin Hamad al Fahd; 1968 (age 57–58) Riyadh
- Other name: Abu Mus'ab
- Occupation: Professor

Religious life
- Religion: Islam
- Denomination: Sunni
- Creed: Athari
- Movement: Salafism

Muslim leader
- Influenced by: Ibn Taymiyya, Hamoud al Aqla al Shuebi

Nasir al-Fahd (Arabic: ناصر بن حمد بن حمين الفهد, romanized: Nāṣir b. Ḥamad b. Ḥumayyin al-Fahd; born 1968) is a Saudi Arabian Salafist Islamic scholar who has been held in detention since May 2003. He was arrested by the Saudi Arabian government after "preaching to his followers to rise up against the infidels" and has since been held without charge as a political prisoner.

== Biography ==
Nasir al-Fahd was born in Riyadh, Saudi Arabia, in the month of Shawwal, 1388 AH (c. Dec 1968 CE). His lineage traces back to the Otaibah. After finishing high school, he began to study engineering at Al-Malik Saud University. In his third year, he changed direction and left to study shari'a (Islamic law) . There he met several prominent shuyukh, and memorized the Qur'an in three months He graduated from Imam Muhammad ibn Saud Islamic University, College of Shari'ah in Riyadh, in Rajab 1412 AH (c. Jan/Feb 1992 CE). Following his graduation, he was appointed as a teaching assistant at the university’s College of Usul al-Din, within the Department of Aqidah and Contemporary Ideologies.

Al-Fahd remained in his academic role at the university He remained in detention for nearly three years until his release in Rajab 1418 AH (c. November/December 1997 CE). Upon his release, he was officially dismissed from his teaching position at the university.

In 1992, al-Fahd was appointed as a dean at Umm al-Qura University, until he was arrested in Rabi' al-Awwal 1415 AH (c. August/September 1994 CE) after writing a poem deriding the "loose morals" of the wife of Saudi Interior Minister Prince Nayef bin Abdulaziz Al Saud. Al-Fahd and other clerics associated with this school, such as Ali al-Khudair and Sulaiman Al-Alwan, became influential among jihadists. They condemned the actions of the Saudi state and provided backing from the Quran for their positions. Al-Fahd wrote in support of the Taliban's destruction of the ancient Buddhas of Bamiyan in Afghanistan. He declared that any Muslim who aided the United States war effort in any manner in Afghanistan or Iraq was an infidel. In a 2003 fatwa, al-Fahd approved of the possession of Weapons of Mass Destruction by Muslim nations to protect Muslims from harm that could be caused by other countries possessing such weapons.

== Arrest and Imprisonment ==
Al-Fahd was arrested in May 2003 by the Saudi Arabian government. He believes that the Saudi state is an apostate regime because it has supported the United States in some of their actions, such as allowing the presence of US troops in the Arabian peninsula to attack Iraq. He defines this as a war against Islam that is focused on killing Muslims.

Al-Fahd is among the 5,000 Saudis being held as "security prisoners" by the Saudi government at al-Ha'ir prison. Accounts and allegations from his family detailed that the Saudi Emergency Forces raided his cell during his confinement, assaulting him, shackling his hands and feet, and dragging him on his back through the prison hallways. According to his son, Musab al-Fahd, the physical abuse resulted in total paralysis of his left hand for a full month. In another instance, Intelligence personnel forced him to sit on an intensely heated iron plate for four hours, causing a severe medical condition that rendered him unable to reach the facilities and forced him to perform his prayers using only movements. Furthermore, he was dragged in chains toward punishment cells and slammed onto the floor twice, which shattered his tooth and molar, while his glasses were destroyed and he was bound kneeling for 11 consecutive nights.

Despite this, some of his fatwas have been able to be smuggled out of prison. In 2014, a pro-IS media group published 'Fatawa al-Ha'iriyyah', a collection of Islamic rulings and answers written by al-Fahd.

== Writings ==
Described as an "extremely bright, charismatic and a very prolific writer", he authored 85 books and treatises. Some of his publications include:

- al-dawla al-uthmaniyya wa mawqif da‘wat al-shaykh muhammad bin ‘abd al-wahhab minha [The Ottoman State and the Position of the Call of Sheikh Muhammad ibn Abd al-Wahhab on it], 1993.
- haqiqat al-hadara al-islamiyya [The Truth of Muslim Civilisation], 1993.
- shi‘r ahmad shawqi fi’l-mizan [The Poetry of Ahmad Shawqi in the Balance], 1994.

During his time at the College of Shari'ah, al-Fahd studied under a prominent group of Islamic scholars, including:

- Sheikh Abdul-Aziz bin Abdullah Al-Rajhi
- Sheikh Abdul-Aziz bin Abdullah Al-Sheikh (Grand Mufti of Saudi Arabia)
- Sheikh Saleh Al-Aatram
- Sheikh Abdullah Al-Rukban
- Sheikh Zaid bin Fayad
- Sheikh Ahmad Ma'bad

== See also ==
- Sulaiman Al-Alwan
- Ali al-Khudair
