= Institute of Translation and Arabization =

Saudi academic institute

- معهد الترجمة والتعريب
- Type: Public
- Established: December 25, 2011
- Dean: Dr. Ahmed Abdullah Albanyan
- Location: Riyadh, Kingdom of Saudi Arabia
- Website: http://tai.imamu.edu.sa

The Institute of Translation and Arabization (TAI) (Arabic: معهد الترجمة والتعريب) is the first Saudi academic institute specialized in translation and Arabization services. (Note: In this context, translation refers to translation from Arabic into foreign languages, while Arabization refers to translation from foreign languages into Arabic.) It is one of Imam Muhammad ibn Saud Islamic University specialized Institutions.

== About the Institute ==
=== Establishment ===
A Royal approval was issued regarding the establishment of the Institute of Translation and Arabization at Imam Muhammad Ibn Saud Islamic University pursuant to the Higher Education Council's resolution number (39/66/1432) issued in the Council's sixty-sixth session and dated in 20 Shawwal 1432 AH (18 September 2011) based on the University Council's resolution number (2220–1430-1431 AH) issued in the sixth session and dated in 17 Jumada II 1431 AH (31 May 2010). The Institute started its work as of 30 Muharram 1433 AH (25 December 2011) with the appointment of its first Dean. Despite the Institute's recent establishment, the University's efforts in translation and Arabization are long-standing and began since its establishment.

=== Vision ===
To make the Institute of Translation and Arabization a leading institution in conveying the enriched fields of science and knowledge in Islam, Arabic and humanities to the non-native speakers of Arabic. And to take part in Arabizing various fields of knowledge and science for the benefit of Arabic speakers.

=== Mission ===
To provide a motivational ground run by the best qualified staff in the fields of translation and Arabization in order to enrich the University disciplines with theoretical and applied knowledge from different languages in a way that would meet the needs of different community sectors and reflect the University's global mission.

== Objectives ==
1. Reflecting the Kingdom of Saudi Arabia’s global mission through the Institute's translation services to convey the achievements of scholars, researchers and faculty members in Saudi universities and scientific centers in the fields of humanities, Islamic and social sciences to beneficiaries worldwide.
2. Participating in realizing the Custodian of the Two Holy Mosques King Abdullah Ibn Abdulaziz’s vision in making a scholarly communication with the developed countries for mutual benefits and to boost interfaith and intercultural dialogue.
3. Enriching the scientific and cultural content of the University's scientific disciplines by Arabizing books and scientific references.
4. Presenting the University's clear image through reflecting its interest in Translation and Arabization.
5. Translating journals, books and distinguished research, issued by the University, to other languages.
6. Re-Arabizing scientific books that lost their Arabic origin.
7. Translating scientific terms, compiling terminological dictionaries in cooperation with the University's academic departments and similar scientific institutions and working on standardizing and publicizing them.
8. Assisting religious and legal bodies in Saudi Arabia in Arabizing terms related to their field of work.
9. Translating laws, regulations, agreements and documents.
10. Arabizing laws, regulations, agreements and documents.
11. Providing translation, interpretation and editing services to beneficiary bodies inside and outside the Kingdom of Saudi Arabia.
12. Conducting research related to the field of translation.

== Institute Services ==
- Translation & Arabization
- Research & Development
- Training

== See also ==
- Imam Muhammad Ibn Saud Islamic University
