= Turki al-Hamad =

Saudi Arabian political analyst, journalist, and novelist

- تركي الحمد
- Born: Turki al-Hamad; 10 March 1952 (age 74); Al-Karak, Jordan
- Occupations: Journalist, novelist

Turki al-Hamad (Arabic: تركي الحمد, Turki al-Ḥamad; born 10 March 1952) is a Saudi Arabian political analyst, journalist, and novelist, best known for his trilogy about the coming-of-age of Hisham al-Abir, a Saudi Arabian teenager, the first installment of which, Adama, was published in 1998. Although banned in Saudi Arabia, Bahrain, and Kuwait, the Arabic edition of the trilogy—called in Arabic Atyaf al-Aziqah al-Mahjurah (Phantoms of the Deserted Alley)—has sold 20,000 copies.

The novels explore the issues of sexuality, underground political movements, scientific truth, rationalism, and religious freedom against the backdrop of the late 1960s and early 1970s, a volatile period in Saudi Arabia, sandwiched between the 1967 Six-Day War and the 1973 oil crisis. Hamad is quoted on the cover of one of his novels: "Where I live there are three taboos: religion, politics and sex. It is forbidden to speak about these. I wrote this trilogy to get things moving."

As a result of his work, four fatwas have been issued against him by the country's religious clerics, and he has been named as an apostate in a statement by al-Qaeda. He continues nevertheless to live in Riyadh, calling the fatwas "more of a nuisance than anything else," according to the Daily Star.

== Early life ==
Al-Hamad was born in Jordan to a family of merchants that originated from Buraidah, Al-Qassim Region in Saudi Arabia. The family moved when he was a child to Dammam in the eastern province of Saudi Arabia. He later moved to the United States, where he obtained his Ph.D. from the University of Southern California, later returning to Riyadh to teach political science. He retired in 1995 to take up writing full-time.

== His novels and the response ==
After the first of four fatwas was issued in 1999, Crown Prince Abdullah, who succeeded to the throne of Saudi Arabia in August 2005, offered al-Hamad bodyguards for his protection.

The next three were issued after the publication of the third in the trilogy, Karadib, in which the main character wonders whether God and the devil are the same thing, and which the clerics regarded as heresy. As a result, he was threatened by the mutaween by e-mail, and accused of apostasy by al-Qaeda. One fatwa was withdrawn in 2003 by Sheikh Ali Al-Khudair, a well-known Saudi scholar. Karadib will be published in English in 2006.

Al-Hamad's latest novel, The Winds of Paradise, is about the September 11, 2001 attacks and was published in Arabic in 2005. It has been described as a "thinly disguised sketch of the lives of four of the hijackers."

He has elsewhere called 9/11 the "consequence of a chronic disease in the Arab psyche," a "culture of illusion":

It is an illusion when we think that all the world is against us, and [an] illusion when we think that there will not be any existence for us without the perishing of the others. It is illusion when we have either to get the best for ourselves or we have to die. According to this logic either we possess all the rain or let the rain to be stopped if we were thirsty. It is also an illusion if we think that the past is the route to the future and it is illusion if we think that the world without us will not be able to survive; for this reason they compete against each other to exploit us like hyenas struggling for their prey. The greater illusion is that we are God's angels on His land and all the rest of the world are devils.

== Arrest ==
Al-Hamad was arrested December 24, 2012, after a series of tweets on religion and other topics. The arrest was ordered by Saudi Interior Minister Prince Muhammad bin Nayef, however the charges against al-Hamad were not announced. He was freed in 2013.

== Bibliography ==
- Adama, novel, 2003, ISBN 0-86356-311-2
- Shumaisi, novel, 2004, ISBN 978-0-86356-911-1
- Al-Thiqafa al-`Arabiyya Amam Tahaddiyat al-Taghayyur, الثقافة العربية أمام تحدّيات التغيّر (Arab Culture Faces the Challenges of Change)
- Al-Karadib, novel
- Al-Thiqafa al-`Arabiyya fi `Asri 'l-`Awlama, الثقافة العربية في عصر العولمة (Arab Culture in the Age of Globalisation)
- Sharq al-Wadi, شرق الوادي (East of the valley)
- Al-Siyasa Bayn al-Halal wa 'l-Haram, السياسة بين الحلال و الحرام (Politics between the Licit and the Forbidden)
- Riyh Al-Janna (Heaven's Wind) ريح الجنة
