= Fouad Hussein =

Jordanian journalist and author

Fouad Hussein is a Jordanian journalist and author of the 2005 Arabic language book Al-Zarqawi: The Second Generation of Al Qaeda. It is based on interviews with senior Islamic militants, including Abu Musab al-Zarqawi, the late leader of Al-Qaeda in Iraq, and Saif al-Adel, a high-ranking member of al-Qaeda and Islamic Jihad. Hussein first met Zarqawi and Zarqawi's mentor Abu Muhammad al-Maqdisi in 1996 in a Jordanian jail. At the time, Hussein was being held as a political prisoner. Since its release, Hussein's book has garnered heavy press coverage and analysis in Iran. In the book Hussein describes what he says is al-Qaeda's grand strategy, a sequence of events that spreads over nearly 20 years.

== First phase, "The First Awakening" ==
The stage began with the September 11th attacks, which were meant to lure the United States into military conflict in the Middle East. This stage, Hussein claimed, ended with the American capture of Baghdad in early April 2003.

== Second phase, "Eye-Opening" ==
Al-Qaeda would become more than just an organization, but a popular trend fueled by the American occupation of Iraq and the Arab media through mediums like the Internet. This would last through 2006.

== Third stage, "Arising and Standing Up" ==
Al-Qaeda would begin focusing its energies on attacking the secular governments in Syria and Turkey and also against Israel until 2010

== Fourth stage, "Toppling the regimes" ==
Continuous weakening of American strength in the Middle East while also causing the capitulation of governments across the Arab world.

== Fifth stage, "Declaration of Caliphate" ==
From 2013 to 2016, Hussein said the Islamic movement would have shifted the balance of power in the Middle East away from the West and Israel, and the Islamists would be supported by new allies such as China. In this environment a new caliphate will be established. Al Qaeda, he wrote, also expected the Americans to go after Iran's principal ally in the region, Syria. The removal of the Assad regime - a long-time goal of jihadis - would allow the country to be infiltrated by Al Qaeda, putting the terrorists within reach, at last, of Israel.

== Sixth phase, "Total Confrontation" ==
Lasting until 2020, it is when an Islamic army and the newly formed caliphate would defeat the non-believers in a global conflict.

== Final phase, "Definitive Victory" ==
The caliphate would rule the world, because the rest of the world will be so beaten down by the "one-and-a-half billion Muslims".

== 2014 Assessment ==
Stage Four happened to pass with Arab Spring revolutions.

Stage Five was completed with ISIS's declaration of caliphate.
