= General Presidency of Haramain =

Saudi government agency

- General Presidency for the Affairs of the Masjid al-Haram and Masjid an-Nabawi
- الرئاسة العامة لشئون المسجد الحرام و المسجد النبوي

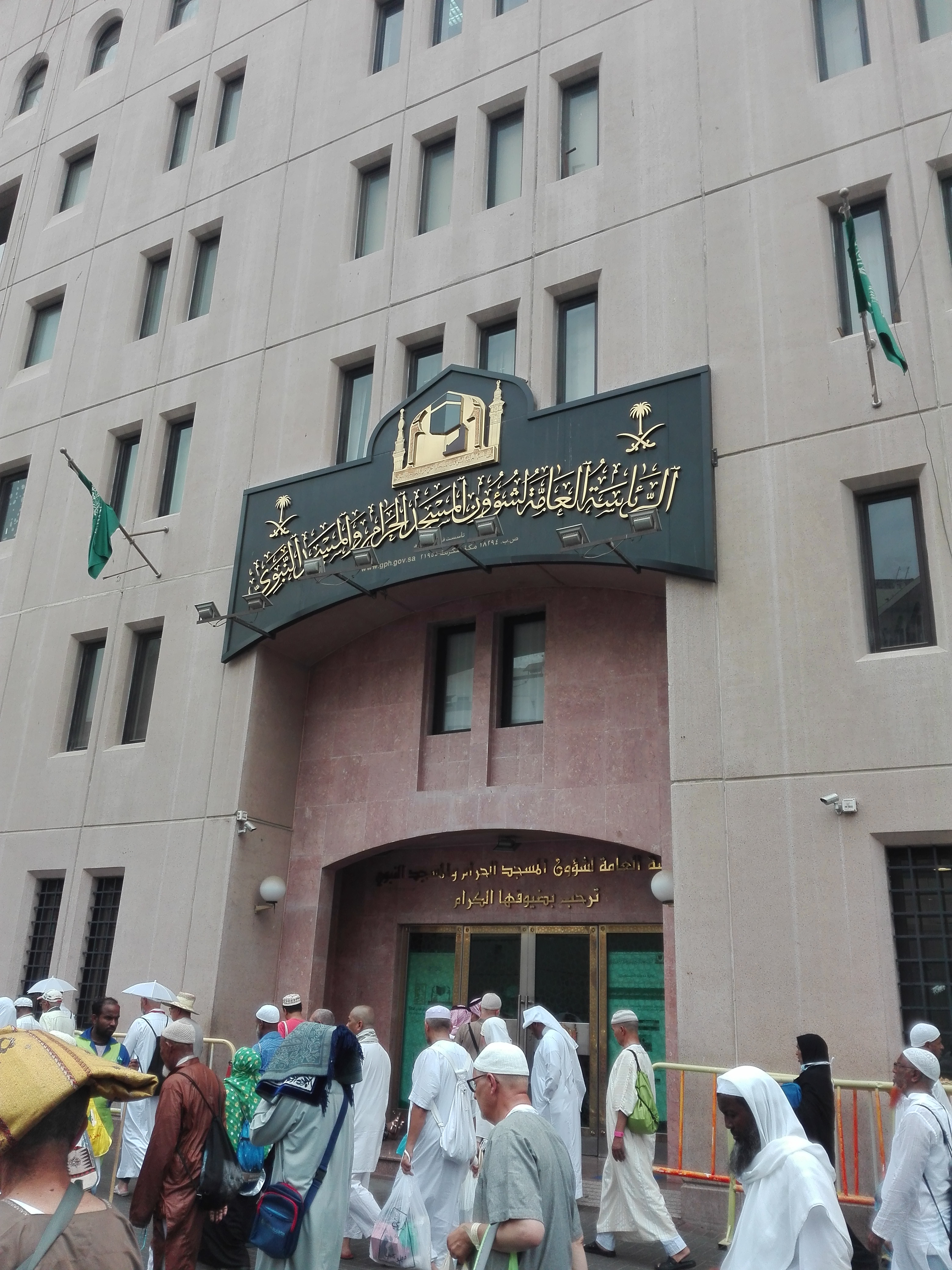
- Named after: Masjid al-Haram, Al-Masjid an-Nabawi
- Formation: 8 May 2012
- Type: Governmental
- Headquarters: within Masjid al-Haram
- Location: Mecca, Saudi Arabia
- Official language: Arabic (working language); English and other languages for pilgrims
- President: Abdul-Rahman Al-Sudais
- Chairman of the Board of Directors: Tawfig Al-Rabiah
- Subsidiaries: Agency for the Affairs of the Prophet’s Mosque; King Abdulaziz Complex for Holy Kaaba Kiswa

The General Presidency for the Affairs of Masjid al-Haram and Masjid an-Nabawi (Arabic: الهيئة العامة للعناية بشؤون المسجد الحرام و المسجد النبوي) is a Saudi government agency responsible for the development and administration of the Islamic holy sites of the Masjid al-Haram and the Masjid an-Nabawi, facilitated by its religious, technical, and administrative departments. The agency was founded on 8 May 2012 through a royal decree by King Abdullah of Saudi Arabia. Headquartered at the Masjid al-Haram in Mecca, the agency is overseen by the President, who is appointed by royal order.

The incumbent President of the agency is Abdul-Rahman al-Sudais, imam of the Masjid al-Haram, who was appointed the president of the agency the same day it was formed. His term has since been renewed thrice by King Salman of Saudi Arabia.

== History ==
The General Presidency was founded on 8 May 2012 through a royal decree by King Abdullah of Saudi Arabia, who also appointed Abdul-Rahman al-Sudais as its president. He has been re-appointed to the position thrice since by King Salman of Saudi Arabia, in 2016 and 2020 and 2024 and is the current incumbent.

== Administration ==
The agency oversees several other departments overseeing various other aspects of the two mosques, such as the Kiswah factory. The administration of the Masjid an-Nabawi is carried out by the Agency of the General Presidency of the Affairs of the Prophet's Mosque, a subagency of the General Presidency for the Affairs of Masjid al-Haram and Masjid al-Nabawi.

The President of the agency is appointed for a 4-year term by the King of Saudi Arabia.
