= State Security Court =

The State Security Court is a judicial institution in Jordan. It deals with cases regarding state security, but also with drug offences and other types of cases. The defendants in the court can be both military personnel as well as civilians.

The Court has faced criticism for lack of independence from the executive, unfair trials, and civilians being defendants in a militarized court.

== History ==
The State Security Court was derived from earlier military courts from the time when Jordan was under martial law.

In September 2011, King Abdullah II of Jordan limited the possibilities of the Court to adjudicate over civilians. There would be only four types of offences over which it was to have jurisdiction: high treason, espionage, terrorism, and drug trafficking. The changes to the law were to take effect in three years. The Parliament of Jordan had voted against proposals to remove all jurisdiction over civilians in the court.

== Legal process ==
The judges on the State Security Court are both civilians and military personnel. The court can adjudicate in cases against military and civilians.

The jurisdiction of the court lies in both external as internal state security, drug offences and others. The State Security Court's cases are in principle open to the public, unless the court decides otherwise.

The amended Press and Publication Law of March 2010 forbids journalists from being referred to the State Security Court on cases regarding freedom of expression or speech.

The decisisions of the court can be appealed before the High Court.

== Criticism ==
Human Rights Watch has criticized the State Security Court's lack of independence from the executive, as the Prime Minister appoints the judges on the court. It furthermore criticized the inclusion of offenses related to peaceful speech. The criticism was made after protests in Jordan in 2012 led to detainees being charged in the court.

Amnesty International has criticized the State Security Court for having unfair trials.

The Bureau of Democracy, Human Rights, and Labor of the United States Department of State in its 2010 Human Rights Report on Jordan noted that attorneys only get to meet their clients shortly before the court case starts.

The United Nations Human Rights Committee has recommended abolishing the State Security Court to Jordan.
