= Tariq Abdelhaleem =

Egyptian Islamist

Personal life
- Born: 1 September 1948 (age 77) Cairo, Egypt
- Children: Shareef Abdelhaleem
- Parent(s): Abdul Hafeedh Ahmad, Zaynab Abdul Azeez Saleem al-Bishri
- Known for: Praised by Ayman al-Zawahiri, declaring liberals and secularists as "infidels," calling for violent jihad, advising jihadist groups such as Al-Qaeda, calling for the shedding of blood against Egyptian leader Abdel Fattah el-Sisi.
- Occupation: Islamist cleric, former head of Dar al-Arqam institution, civil engineer

Religious life
- Religion: Islam

Muslim leader
- Based in: Mississauga, Ontario, Canada
- Previous post: Head of the Dar al-Arqam institute

Tariq Abdelhaleem (طارق عبد الحليم; born 1 September 1948) is an Egyptian Islamist cleric and scholar residing in Mississauga, Ontario, Canada, and the former head of the Dar al-Arqam Institution there.

Tariq Abdelhaleem, along with Abu Qatada, Abu Muhammad al-Maqdisi, and Hani al-Sibai was praised by Ayman al-Zawahiri, the leader of Al-Qaeda. Although being used as a scholarly reference by the group, he has no direct affiliation.

== Early life ==
He was born on September 1, 1948, in the al-Jami' ul-Isma'ili area of Cairo. His father was Abdul Hafeedh Ahmad, a former head of tax cassations and a lawyer with Upper Egypt origins in Qena Governorate.

His maternal great-grandfathe a native of the Beheira Governorate, was Salim Al-Bishri, a Shaykh al-Islām and grand imam of Al-Azhar University from 1899 until 1903 and then again from 1909 until 1917. His maternal grandfather was Abdul Azeez al Bishri, a memorizer of Hadith, and his mother was Zaynab Abdul Azeez Saleem al-Bishri.

== Ideology and causes ==
In an article in the Arab Times, Abdelhaleem was credited for helping refute the 9/11 Truth movement conspiracy film 911: In Plane Site.

Abdelhaleem declared liberals and secularists as "infidels", in the hopes of accelerating a clash between Islamists and secularists and liberals. His work was published by Hani al-Siba'i who is wanted in Egypt. Hani al-Sibai wrote an article defending Tariq Abdelhaleem from criticism. Tariq Abdelhaleem issued a joint statement with Hani al-Siba'i condemning ISIS in 2014.

In the aftermath of the overthrow of the Egyptian president Mohamed Morsi and the Muslim Brotherhood, Tariq Abdelhaleem posted a video of himself called a "message to the Mujahideen of Egypt" calling for jihad against Egyptian leader Abdel Fattah el-Sisi, cursing Sisi, calling him "a Jew", and accusing Sisi of being pro-Christian, and of supporting the Coptic Pope.

In an article published in the 19th edition of the Turkistan Islamic Party's magazine "Islamic Turkistan" Tariq Abdelhaleem named Buddhists as the enemy of Turkistan.^{:38} In the magazine, Abdelhaleem singled out the Persian Gulf, Jordan, the Levant, and Egypt as places of an internal enemy of Islam and the Caucasus, Chechnya, Afghanistan, and Turkistan as places of an occupying enemy of Islam.^{:44}

== Works ==
In the nineties of the last century, Dr. Abdelhaleem contributed to Physics research by introducing a genuine and unprecedented definition of time, in his own words: "Time is a displacement of Location" https://tariq-abdelhaleem.net/ar/post/73545.

- الأعمال الكاملة (The Complete Works) - A compilation of the author's lifetime work gathered in 8 volumes, including topics such as Islamic jurisprudence, principles of Islamic Jurisprudence, history, political Islam, history of the Egyptian revolution, history of contemporary Arab politics, etc.
- الجواب المفيد في حكم جاهل التوحيد (The Beneficial Answer Regarding Ignorance of Tawheed) - Arguably the author's most famous and influential book, in which he details how ignorance affects the different branches of faith. It is also known for its introduction, written by the former Grand Mufti of Saudi Arabia, Abdul-Aziz Ibn Baz.
- مفتاح الدخول إلى علم الأصول (The Key to the Science of the Principles of Jurisprudence) - An introductory book for beginners to the science of the principles of jurisprudence.
- حقيقة الإيمان (The Essence of Faith) - An outline of Islamic faith based on that of classical scholars.
- دفاع عن الشريعة (Defence of the Shariah) - A book supporting the Sharia and its merits.
- مقالات في السياسة والشريعة والحياة (Words Regarding Politics, Sharia, and Life)
- دراسات في الفرق (Sect Series) - A series of multiple books explaining the beliefs, creeds, and practices of various Islamic sects such as Sufism, Mu'tazilism, Ash'arism, and Maturidism.
- المصلحة في الشريعة الإسلامية (Public Interest in Islamic Sharia).
- فتوى شيخ الإسلام في من بدل شرائع الإسلام (The Judgment of Ibn Taymiyyah Regarding Those who alter the Law of God) - An analysis of what Ibn Taymiyyah has said regarding those who change Islamic guidelines.

== See also ==
- Wagdy Ghoneim
- Sayyid Qutb
- Muhammad Surur
- Abdul Razzaq al-Mahdi
- Abdullah al-Muhaysini
