= Abu Muhammad al-Maqdisi =

Palestinian Islamist writer (born 1959)

Abu Muhammad al-Maqdisi أبو محمد المقدسي

Personal life
- Born: Assem ibn Muhammad ibn Tahir al-Barqawi; 1959 (age 66–67) Nablus, Jordanian West Bank
- Era: Modern
- Main interest(s): Preaching militant Islam and opposing any form of democracy
- Education: University of Mosul

Religious life
- Religion: Islam
- Denomination: Salafi Jihadism

Muslim leader
- Influenced by: Muhammad Surur Sayyid Qutb
- Influenced: Abu Musab al-Zarqawi Turki al-Binali

Abu Muhammad al-Maqdisi, whose real name is Assem ibn Muhammad ibn Tahir al-Barqawi, is a Palestinian writer and Salafi Islamist scholar. Al-Maqdisi is known for popularizing several significant themes within radical Islam, including the theological concept of Al-Wala' wal-Bara'. He is regarded as one of the earliest public Islamists to openly denounce the Saudi royal family as apostates from Islam. Al-Maqdisi posits that democracy functions as a religion in its own right and has accused Muslim advocates of democracy of apostasy. Additionally, he is recognized as the mentor of Jordanian jihadist Abu Musab al-Zarqawi, who served as the initial leader of al-Qaeda in Iraq. In 2004, a significant ideological and methodological divide emerged between al-Maqdisi and al-Zarqawi due to the latter's declaration of takfir against all Iraqi Shīʿites. Al-Maqdisi advocated for targeted killings of Shīʿites instead, to prevent al-Zarqawi's approach from becoming counterproductive.

As of 2012, al-Maqdisi's writings maintained a wide following. A study by the Combating Terrorism Center at the United States Military Academy (USMA) concluded that al-Maqdisi "is the most influential living jihadi theorist" and that "by all measures, Maqdisi is the key contemporary ideologue in the jihadi intellectual universe." The jihadist website Minbar at-Tawhid wal-Jihad, which al-Maqdisi owned at the time, remained operational as, according to the USMA report, "al-Qa`ida [sic]'s main online library".

== Background ==
Maqdisi was born in 1959 in Nablus, West Bank. At a young age, his family immigrated to Kuwait. He later studied at the University of Mosul in Iraq, where he began to adopt an Islamist worldview.

He traveled around Kuwait and Saudi Arabia to visit numerous religious students and sheikhs. However, he concluded that many of these figures were ignorant of the true state of affairs in the Muslim world. He then began to study the writings of Sayyid Qutb and Hassan al-Banna and the methods of the Muslim Brotherhood.

Maqdisi traveled to Pakistan and Afghanistan and met with many Afghan jihadi groups , he spent three years in Peshawar, a hub for the Afghan Jihad, as a professor of religion. There, he met Abu Musab al-Zarqawi and published influential works, including Millat Ibrahim and Al-Kawashif al-Jaliyya fi Kufr al-Dawla al-Sa'udiyya, the latter condemning the Saudi state as infidels. He also confronted members of Takfir wal-Hijra and wrote a book refuting their extreme views. In 1992, he returned to Jordan and denounced the Jordanian government for its perceived insufficiently Islamist policies. Furthermore, he was the first prominent Islamist scholar to brand the House of Saud as unbelievers or takfir and to consider the adoption of democracy as tantamount to apostasy. His teachings gained many adherents, drawing the attention of the Jordanian government, leading to his arrest and imprisonment. During his 1995–1999 imprisonment with al-Zarqawi, he strongly influenced al-Zarqawi, shaping his Islamist ideology. Their strategic plans were described by Fouad Hussein in his book Al-Zarqawi: The Second Generation of Al Qaeda.

After their release, al-Zarqawi departed for Afghanistan, while Maqdisi remained in Jordan. He was later rearrested on terrorism charges for conspiring to attack American targets in Jordan. He was released in July 2005 but arrested again after an interview with Qatari state-affiliated Al Jazeera. In 2009, he defended himself against "younger extremists accus[ing] him of going soft" by quoting the American Combating Terrorism Center at West Point, which identified him "as a dangerous and influential jihadi theorist."

Maqdisi served a five-year term in a Jordanian prison for allegedly jeopardizing state security and recruiting jihadists to fight in Afghanistan. The Jordanian government released him in June 2014, likely due to their opposition to the Islamic State of Iraq and the Levant. On 21 September 2014, he advocated for the release of British national Alan Henning, who was held by the Islamic State. Al-Maqdisi stated, "Henning worked with a charitable organization led by Muslims, which sent several aid convoys to help the Syrian people. Is it reasonable that his reward is being kidnapped and slaughtered? ... He should be rewarded with thanks...We call on the (Islamic) State to release this man (Henning) and other aid group employees who enter the land of Muslims with a guarantee of protection ... according to the judgment of Shariah law."

In 2009, Maqdisi advised against joining the Yemeni government in its conflict with the Houthis, a Shia insurgent group. He also urged Yemenis to avoid supporting what he described as the country's then-pro-Western government, advocating for its replacement.

=== Jihadi relationships ===
East Turkestan Bulletin News Agency reported that al-Filistini praised the Turkistan Islamic Party along with Abdul Razzaq al Mahdi, al-Maqdisi, Abdullah al-Muhaysini, and Ayman al-Zawahiri.

Al-Muhaysini referenced al-Maqdisi and Abu Qatada.

Al-Maqdisi offered condolences upon the death of Omar Abdel-Rahman.

Tariq Abdelhaleem criticized Barqawi on Twitter for his criticism of Hay'at Tahrir al-Sham. Abdelhaleem criticized Barqawi's statement on al-Sham. Abdelhaleem tweeted a defense of Abu Jaber Sheikh in response to Barqawi. Maqdisi criticized Nusra. Al-Maqdisi slammed a spokesman of the Hayat Tahrir al-Sham (HTS).

Euphrates Shield was also attacked and criticized by al-Maqdisi.

== Views ==
=== Democracy ===
Al-Maqdisi elucidated his perspective on democracy in his book, "Democracy: A Religion".

“By legislating man-made laws rather than divine ones, they challenge the sovereignty of the Deity. This of course is shirk [idolatry] and is the most severe of the sins that one can commit against Allah. Because these legislators disbelieve in Allah and His divine law, it is the duty of every Muslim to fight them through jihad.”

Al-Maqdisi defines democracy as:

“political philosophy that draws adherents to it, much like socialism and communism. In this way, it competes with true religions such as Islam. In fact, democracy is greater than the cogs that put it to work, for if the people would demand of their representatives to inject the law with a more Islamic flavor, they would be told it contradicts democracy.”

== Works ==
- This is our Aqeedah
- Millat Ibrahim
- Democracy is a Religion
- The Obvious Proofs of the Saudi State's Disbelief
- ...So, Do Not Fear Them!
- Expecting the Best from Allah
- Delighting The Sight by Exposing the Doubts of Contemporary Murjiah
- Meezaanul-I'itidaal li-taqyim kitaab ul-Mawrid al-Zilaal fi-Tanbeeh ala' Akthaa al-Dhilaal
