= Rima Karaki =

- Known for: Journalist at Future TV and Al Jadeed television stations

Rima Karaki (Arabic: ريما كركي) is a Lebanese television show host, author and columnist.

== Career ==
Karaki studied Computer Management at American University of Beirut. In 1998, she became the presenter of Alam al Sabah (عالم الصباح) on the Lebanese TV station Future TV. She later joined Al Jadeed in 2014, presenting the program Lel Nasher (للنشر), on Al Jadeed. She gained international notice from her interview with Hani al-Sibai. She later worked for Dubai TV in 2018, Alhurra in 2021, and Rotana Media Group in 2024.

== Hani Al-Sibai interview ==
In March 2015, Karaki interviewed al-Qaeda supporter and former Iraqi Islamic Jihad member the Islamist scholar Hani al-Sibai. During the live television interview she cut him off after he had told her to "shut up" and said "It's beneath me to be interviewed by you. You are a woman who . . ." The interview went viral shortly after being released causing public outrage over his sexist remark. The video was viewed by more than five million viewers on YouTube within a week. Karaki stopped the interview after three minutes, saying: “Just one second. Either there is mutual respect or the conversation is over.” And she cut off his mic.

== Books ==
- Tonight I will confess (2009)
