= Abdul-Rahman al-Barrak =

Saudi Salafi cleric

Abdul-Rahman bin Nasir al-Barrak

Personal life
- Born: 1933 (age 92–93) Al Bukayriah, Al-Qassim Province
- Era: Modern era
- Region: Saudi Arabia

Religious life
- Religion: Islam
- Jurisprudence: Hanbali
- Creed: Athari
- Movement: Salafism

Muslim leader
- Influenced by: Ahmad ibn Hanbal, Ibn Taymiyya, Ibn Qayyim al-Jawziyya, Muhammad ibn Abd al-Wahhab
- Influenced: Sulaiman Al-Alwan

Abdul-Rahman bin Nasir al-Barrak (Arabic: عبد الرحمن بن ناصر البراك, born 1933 or 1934) is a Saudi Salafi cleric.

In 1994, al-Barrak and other Saudi clerics were mentioned by name and praised by Osama bin Laden for opposing then-Grand Mufti Abd al-Aziz ibn Baz in his Open Letter to Shaykh Bin Baz on the Invalidity of his Fatwa on Peace with the Jews.

His website was banned in Saudi Arabia because it was “promoting bold ideas and theses”.

== Fatwas ==
Al-Barrak has drawn attention for issuing controversial fatwas, or religious edicts. One such fatwa called for strict gender segregation. The fatwa states, "Whoever allows(makes halal) this mixing ... allows forbidden things, and whoever allows them is a kafir and this means defection from Islam ... Either he retracts or he must be killed ... because he disavows and does not observe the Sharia."

In March 2008, al-Barrak issued a fatwa that two writers for the newspaper Al Riyadh, Abdullah bin Bejad al-Otaibi and Yousef Aba al-Khail, should be tried for apostasy for their "heretical articles" regarding the categorization of "unbelievers" and put to death if they did not repent.
