= Abu Qatada al-Filistini =

Islamic cleric, alleged al-Qaeda member (born 1959)

- أبو قتادة الفلسطيني
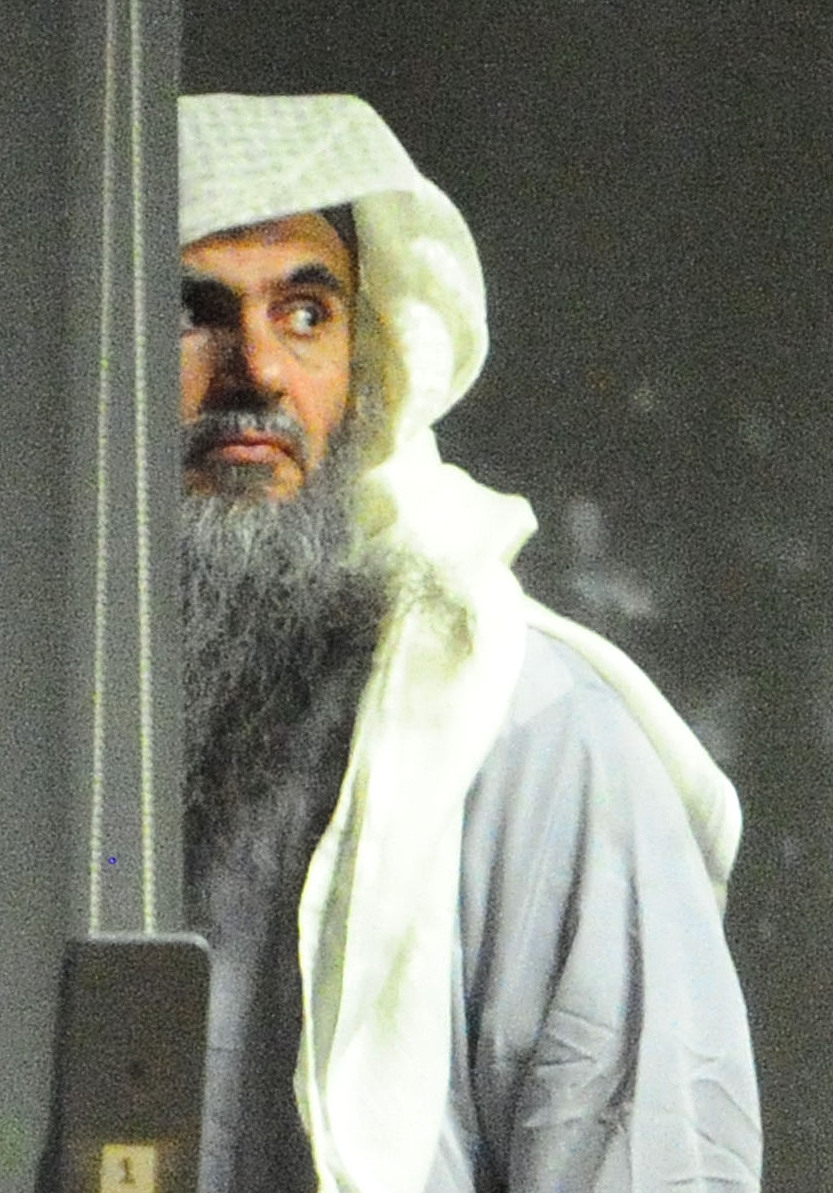
- Abu Qatada during his deportation to Jordan on 7 July 2013
- Born: Omar Mahmoud Othman; 30 December 1960 (age 65); Bethlehem, Jordan-annexed West Bank
- Other name: Abu Omar
- Citizenship: Jordanian
- Known for: Alleged links with terrorism, imprisonment without trial

Omar Mahmoud Othman (Arabic: عمر بن محمود بن عثمان, romanized: 'Umar ibn Maḥmūd ibn 'Uṯmān; born 30 December 1960), (Note: Abu Qatada's personal name (ism) is Omar. Officially, this is followed by his patronymic (nasab), consisting of his father's personal name (ibn Mahmoud) and sometimes that of his paternal grandfather (ibn Othman). The name 'Abu Qatada' is a kunya that is used in preference to his official name; the two words form a single unit, and calling him 'Qatada' is incorrect. The name 'Abu Omar' is an alternative kunya that he has used. 'Al-Filistini' is a surname (nisba) meaning 'the Palestinian'. Although never used, his full name is Abu Qatada Omar ibn Mahmoud ibn Othman al-Filistini.) better known as his nom de guerre Abu Qatada al-Filistini (/ˈɑːbuː kəˈtɑːdə/ AH-boo kə-TAH-də; Arabic: أبو قتادة الفلسطيني, romanized: 'Abū Qatāda al-Filisṭīnī), is a Jordanian Salafi cleric. Abu Qatada was accused of having links to terrorist organisations and frequently imprisoned in the United Kingdom without formal charges or prosecution before being deported to Jordan, where he was acquitted of multiple terrorism charges.

Abu Qatada claimed asylum in the United Kingdom in 1993 on a forged passport. In 1999, he was convicted in absentia in Jordan of planning thwarted terror plots during Jordan's millennium eve and was sentenced to lifetime imprisonment with hard labour. Abu Qatada was repeatedly imprisoned and released in the United Kingdom after he was first detained under anti-terrorism laws in 2002 but was not prosecuted for any crime. The Algerian government described Abu Qatada as being involved with Islamists in London and possibly elsewhere. After initially barring the United Kingdom from deporting Abu Qatada to Jordan, in May 2012 the European Court of Human Rights denied him leave to appeal against deportation.

On 12 November 2012, the UK Special Immigration Appeals Commission (SIAC) upheld Abu Qatada's appeal against deportation and released him on restrictive bail conditions. The Home Secretary Theresa May said the government would appeal against the decision. He was deported to Jordan on 7 July 2013, after the UK and Jordanian governments agreed and ratified a treaty satisfying the need for clarification that evidence potentially gained through torture would not be used against him in his forthcoming trial.

On 26 June 2014, Abu Qatada was retried as is required by the Jordanian legal system if the defendant is returned to the country. He was found not guilty by a Jordanian court of terrorism charges relating to one alleged 1999 plot. He remained in prison pending a verdict that was due September 2014 on a second alleged plot. On 24 September 2014, a panel of civilian judges sitting at Amman's State Security Court cleared him of being involved in a thwarted plot aimed at Western and Israeli targets in Jordan during the millennium celebrations in 2000 due to "insufficient evidence". Evidence used to convict him in the previous trial was disregarded, per the treaty signed between the United Kingdom and Jordan, as they may have been potentially acquired through torture.

Despite his history with militancy, scholar of Islam Daniel Lav argues that it should not hide his scholarly credentials in traditional Islamic studies, as "he certainly has connections to al-Qaʻida, but he is also the author of a polemic against the theological views of a nineteenth-century rector of al-Azhar, coauthor of a reference work on the eleventh-century scholar Ibn Hazm's evaluations of transmitters of hadith, and editor of an influential twentieth-century Wahhabi work of theology." In the same tone, Victoria Brittain, a former associate foreign editor of The Guardian, and who knows him personally, also says that "the man behind the myth is a scholar with wide intellectual and cultural interests. He wrote books while he was in prison. His home is filled with books."

== Life ==
Abu Qatada, who was born Omar Mahmoud Othman, has Jordanian nationality because he was born in Bethlehem in the West Bank in 1960, which at that time was ruled by Jordan. In 1989, he went to Peshawar in Pakistan where he served as a professor of sharia sciences. He obtained his Bachelor's in Islamic jurisprudence in 1984 while in Jordan and his Master's in the same subject from the Peshawar University, where he became a lecturer through the influence of another Jordanian-Palestinian influential jihadi cleric, Abu Muhammad al-Maqdisi. Abu Qatada said that while in Pakistan he had no relationship to Al-Qaeda, which was just beginning to form in Afghanistan at that time. In 1991, after the Gulf War, Abu Qatada was expelled from Kuwait, along with many other Palestinians. He returned to Jordan, but in September 1993, he fled with his wife and five children to the UK, using a forged UAE passport. Citing religious persecution and stating he had been tortured in Jordan, Abu Qatada requested asylum, which was granted in June 1994.

Around 1994, Abu Qatada started up and was editor-in-Chief of a weekly magazine, Usrat al-Ansar, a Groupe Islamique Armé (GIA) propaganda outlet. Abu Qatada provided the intellectual and ideological support for the journal, which became "a trusted source of news and information about the GIA for Islamists around the world."

Abu Qatada was granted leave to remain to 30 June 1998. On 8 May 1998, he applied for indefinite leave to remain. This application had not been determined before Abu Qatada's arrest on 23 October 2002. On that date British authorities detained him under the Anti-terrorism, Crime and Security Act 2001.

Abu Qatada resided in the United Kingdom until 7 July 2013, when he was deported back to Jordan to face retrials for alleged involvement in varied Jordanian mayhem. He was freed after both Jordanian retrials, in which by formal agreement with the UK government evidence obtained by torture was discarded. His imprisonment ended in September 2014.

According to Conservative politician Boris Johnson, Abu Qatada's residence in Britain is estimated to have cost the British taxpayer at least £500,000 in benefit payments to his family and other expenses by early 2012. The Daily Telegraph claimed the cost to be as high as £3 million by May 2012, a figure that was not confirmed by the British Home Office.

== Views ==
Abu Qatada belonged to the Salafi sect, though he strongly criticised the followers of fellow Salafi Rabee al-Madkhali for being too closely aligned to the Saudi government. At the same time Abu Qatada praised fellow Salafi writer Nasiruddin Albani and considered him a great scholar.

In 1995, Abu Qatada reportedly issued a fatwa stating that it is justified to kill both Muslims who renounce their faith and their families. In 1997, Abu Qatada called on Muslims to kill the wives and children of Egyptian police and army officers.

In October 1999, he gave a speech at London's Four Feathers mosque in which he "effectively issued a fatwa authorising the killing of Jews, including Jewish children", according to the British case against him. He reportedly told his congregation that American citizens "should be attacked, wherever they were" and that "there was no difference between English, Jews and Americans".

In a sermon on 14 September 2001, he described the 9/11 attacks as part of a wider battle between Christendom and Islam. In autumn 2002, a poem praising Osama bin Laden and glorifying the attacks appeared online. It was attributed to Abu Qatada. In another sermon he stated that it was not a sin for a Muslim to kill a non-believer for the sake of Islam.

The contents of an article written by him for Al-Risalah, the propaganda magazine of al-Qaeda in Syria, were reported by several news outlets. In it he said that Islam will dominate every land and the "state of Jews" will collapse by the "grace of Allah". He also attacked the Shias in the article calling by them the derogatory term "Rawafidh" and said "Allah exposes our enemies from amongst the filthy Rawafidh, heretics, and their beloved friends from amongst the polytheists".

In January 2016, Abu Qatada released a video on his YouTube account, the 24th installment of a project entitled 1,000 Books before Death, discussing The Protocols of the Elders of Zion and in which he stated (as translated by MEMRI), that blood libel accusation against Jews is true, stating that "This Jewish blood matzos ... there is a text in the Talmud ... It says that the matzos eaten by the Jews on their holiday must be consecrated with the blood of a man from among the Gentiles. Usually they take a Christian because they cannot overpower a Muslim. This actually happened, yet they [the BBC] treat it as a mockery." In the same video, Abu Qatada alleged that "The Jews control the world and that is a fact. The Jews run the global economy, that is a fact. Do you want me to give you the numbers? Can any rational person who has read the history of the Bolshevik Revolution deny that it was won due to the support of the Jews, and the Jewish money of the Rothschild family? Can anyone deny that Lenin was Jewish? Can any rational person dare say that there is even one Communist party in the world that was not founded by the Jews?"

== Links and influence ==
Although Abu Qatada distanced himself from al-Qaeda following his arrest in London in 2001, Fawaz Gerges remarks that Abu Qatada had extensive contacts with al-Qaeda operatives in Afghanistan at the time. Jason Burke notes, "Qutada [sic] has impeccable traditional and modern Salafist credentials and had acted as the in-house alim to radical groups, particularly in Algeria, from his base in northwest London since 1994". In 2001, after bin Laden was criticised by a Salafist faction for issuing fatwas, he turned to Abu Qatada for support, and the support was forthcoming.

According to the indictment of the Madrid al-Qaeda cell prepared by Spanish prosecutors in 2001, Abu Qatada was "considered the spiritual leader" of al-Qaeda in Europe and other groups including the Armed Islamic Group (GIA), the Salafist Group for Preaching and Combat (GSPC), and the Tunisian Combat Group. Abu Qatada has been called by The Times a preacher or advisor to al-Qaeda terrorists Zacarias Moussaoui and Richard Reid. According to The Independent, videos of Abu Qatada's sermons were found in the Hamburg apartment of Mohamed Atta when it was searched after the 11 September 2001 attacks, which Atta led.

When questioned in the UK in February 2001, Abu Qatada was in possession of £170,000 cash and £805 in an envelope labelled "for the Mujahedin in Chechnya". Mr Justice Collins, then chairman of the Special Immigration Appeals Commission (SIAC) that rejected his appeal against detention without charge or trial in 2004, said that Abu Qatada was "heavily involved, indeed was at the centre in the United Kingdom of terrorist activities associated with al-Qaeda. He is a truly dangerous individual". Abu Qatada was subsequently released in 2005, never having been charged with any crime. Abu Qatada's name is included in the UN al-Qaeda sanction list pursuant to United Nations Security Council Resolution 1267.

In 2005, Abu Qatada recorded a video message to the kidnappers of peace activist Norman Kember, appealing for Kember to be released. BBC journalist Alan Johnston was kidnapped in Gaza on 13 March 2007. Johnston's captors, the Doghmush clan who headed the Army of Islam, demanded the release of dozens of captives, including Abu Qatada. Abu Qatada offered to help negotiate Johnston's release. In April 2012, the al-Qaeda-linked Somali group Al-Shabaab threatened an attack against the UK if Abu Qatada was deported.

On 7 February 2012, The Daily Telegraph reported that a senior manager at the BBC had instructed its journalists not to call Abu Qatada an extremist. The BBC subsequently used the form of words "accused of being one of the UK's most dangerous extremist preachers". Others have described him as "a prominent political refugee".

== Persona non-grata ==
Abu Qatada was reported in February 2012 as being wanted on terrorism charges in the United States, Belgium, Spain, France, Germany, Italy and Algeria. Jordan convicted Abu Qatada in absentia; but the conviction did not hold when he appealed in person, after his removal from the UK, where he had spent over a decade in front of various courts in an ultimately vain attempt to avoid deportation. Summaries of these two procedures are given below, in the next two sections.

=== Convictions in Jordan and retrial acquittals ===
In 1999, Abu Qatada was sentenced in absentia by Jordan to life imprisonment with hard labour for conspiracy to carry out terror attacks, and subsequently he was convicted in 2000 to a further 25 years for his involvement in a plot to bomb tourists attending millennium celebrations in Jordan. The 1999 conviction related to events described by the US State Department in 1998 as involving the "Reform and Defiance Movement—a small, mostly indigenous radical Islamic group" targeting the Modern American School and a major hotel between mid-March and early May, with bombings which caused minor property damage but no casualties. (Note: Referred to in the 2009 Law Lords judgement as the "'Reform and Challenge' case".)

In 2008, the UK Court of Appeal concluded "that his 1999 conviction for terrorism was based on evidence extracted through torture". At Abu Qatada's 2012 SIAC hearing, Mr Justice Mitting observed that the evidence presented by Jordan against Abu Qatada "seems extremely thin". Overall, between 2007 and his deportation in 2013, as many as 12 senior British judges in various courts recognised the torture origins of the evidence against him.

Upon returning to Jordan in July 2013, he exercised his right under Jordanian law to a retrial since he was originally convicted in absentia. A Jordanian military court refused to grant him bail during the retrial as he faced terrorism charges. His trial took place in the State Security Court in Amman. On 26 June 2014, Abu Qatada was found not guilty of the charges relating to the 1998 bombings. On 24 September 2014, a panel of civilian judges sitting at Amman's State Security Court cleared him of being involved in the thwarted plot aimed at the millennium celebrations in 2000, as previous evidence was overturned.

=== Arrest and detention in UK ===
In February 2001, Abu Qatada was arrested and questioned in connection with a German terror cell. There was insufficient evidence against him, and all charges were dropped. Tapes of his sermons were later discovered in a Hamburg flat used by the 9/11 hijackers. The Home Office stated that Abu Qatada was the spiritual guide to the 9/11 ringleader Mohamed Atta.

In the wake of 9/11, new anti-terror legislation was quickly introduced in the UK. Abu Qatada, who had hitherto lived with his family in Acton, west London, disappeared. His disappearance and his previous alleged contacts with MI5, prompted speculation by the Times that he was working with British intelligence and had agreed to provide them with information on suspects in the "war on terror". The Times reported that "Britain ignored warnings—which began before the 11 September attacks—from half a dozen friendly governments about Abu Qatada's links with terrorist groups and refused to arrest him. Intelligence chiefs hid from European allies their intention to use the cleric as a key informer against Islamic militants in Britain."

According to The Guardian:

The US, aided by the UK, on behalf of its key ally Jordan, went so far as to kidnap UK residents Jamil el-Banna and Bisher al-Rawi on a business trip in Africa, torture them in Bagram airbase in Afghanistan, and take them to Guantánamo Bay in order to interrogate them about Othman [aka Abu Qatada]. When those men sued the British authorities for what they had done, parliament was persuaded to create secret courts to adjudicate on secret defences.

Members of the EDL and others besieged the Abu Qatada's family home every Saturday, and the police only put an end to the severe, and reportedly terrifying, harassment after a court case forced them to. The duration and location of his detention—without charge or trial—was described by one British judge as "lamentable ... extraordinary ... hardly, if at all, acceptable".

==== 2002–2008 ====
In October 2002, Abu Qatada was arrested in south London and taken to Belmarsh Prison. Here he began a long legal battle against deportation. In October 2002, the then Home Secretary, David Blunkett, detained Abu Qatada indefinitely without trial under Part 4 of the Anti-terrorism, Crime and Security Act 2001 (ATCSA), which at that time provided for such detention. The Special Immigration Appeals Commission subsequently rejected an appeal by Abu Qatada to be released from detention without trial.

Abu Qatada claimed he feared he would be tortured were he to return to Jordan. During this period Abu Qatada lived in a legal twilight as Asim Qureshi, of UK-based human rights group CagePrisoners, explained: "He has not been able to see the evidence against him neither has his lawyer. The only person representing him is a special advocate who is not allowed to speak to him or his solicitor. There you have the bizarre situation where someone is representing him who has never met him or his lawyer."

In 2005, Part 4 of ATCSA was replaced by the Prevention of Terrorism Act 2005, which replaced detentions with control orders, and Abu Qatada was released under such a control order. Five months later, on 12 August 2005, Abu Qatada was detained again pending deportation to Jordan. A British court ruled on 26 February 2007 that he could be deported to Jordan.

==== 2008–2011 ====
On 9 April 2008, the Court of Appeal ruled that Abu Qatada could not be returned to Jordan as he would face a further trial where there was a strong probability that evidence obtained by torture might be used; therefore, extradition would amount to a breach of the United Kingdom's obligations under Article 6 of the European Convention on Human Rights. He was released on bail by the Special Immigration Appeals Commission on 8 May 2008, subject to a 22-hour home curfew and other restrictions. His bail security was provided by former terrorist hostage Norman Kember, whose release Abu Qatada had requested before Kember's rescue by the SAS in 2006.

In November 2008, Abu Qatada was rearrested at his home. The Special Immigration Appeals Commission revoked his bail, stating he had not broken bail conditions, but might do at some time in the future. The commission accepted the government's claim that Abu Qatada posed a significant risk of absconding, and returned him to prison pending his possible deportation.

On 18 February 2009, the House of Lords ruled that Abu Qatada could be deported to Jordan, with Lord Hoffmann declaring that "There is in my opinion no authority for a rule that ... the risk of the use of evidence obtained by torture necessarily amounts to a flagrant denial of justice". On the same day Home Secretary Jacqui Smith served a deportation order against Abu Qatada. No step was taken to enforce the order pending Abu Qatada's appeal to the European Court of Human Rights (ECHR). In the same month the ECHR awarded Abu Qatada £2,500 in a lawsuit he filed against the UK, after judges ruled that his detention without trial in the UK breached his human rights.

==== 2012–2014 ====
On 17 January 2012, the European Court of Human Rights ruled that Abu Qatada could not be deported to Jordan as that would be a violation of his right to a fair trial under Article 6 of the European Convention on Human Rights. This was the first time the court ruled that such an expulsion would be a violation of Article 6. The Special Immigration Appeals Commission subsequently ruled that Abu Qatada should be bailed on highly prescriptive terms for three months while the British government sought further reassurances from Jordan. Under the UN Convention Against Torture, to which the UK is a signatory, states are obliged to refrain from complicity in torture, and thus are forbidden from deporting people to places where a real risk of torture exists. Torture was rife at the time in Jordan and Human Rights Watch has documented allegations of severe abuse, specifically against Islamist detainees. Abu Qatada was released on bail on 13 February 2012. He was prohibited from using a mobile phone, computer or the internet, and subject to an electronically monitored 22-hour curfew that only allowed him to leave home twice a day for a maximum of one hour.

On 17 April 2012, Abu Qatada was rearrested at his home in London. In a statement the same day the Home Secretary, Theresa May, said that reassurances and information received from Jordan meant that Abu Qatada could now be deported. His lawyers said they had lodged an appeal at the European Court of Human Rights, amidst confusion whether the three-month deadline for reappealing following 17 January ruling had passed or not.

On 20 April 2012, Abu Qatada requested the Home Secretary to revoke the deportation order of 18 February 2009. On 18 May 2012, the Home Secretary notified Abu Qatada of her refusal to revoke the order. The European Court of Human Rights had already denied Abu Qatada leave to appeal earlier in the month without specifying a reason, normally taken to indicate that the court considers no new issues have arisen. Abu Qatada was granted leave to appeal in the UK and the case was heard by the Special Immigration Appeals Commission (SIAC). On 12 November 2012, SIAC upheld the appeal, ruling that Abu Qatada was still at risk of having evidence obtained under torture used against him and that the Home Secretary was wrong not to revoke the deportation order against him. Abu Qatada was granted bail on restrictive conditions. The Home Secretary Theresa May said the government would appeal the decision. Abu Qatada's solicitor Gareth Peirce, commenting on the ruling, said: "It is important to reaffirm this country's position that we abhor the use of torture and a case that was predicated upon evidence from witnesses who have been tortured is rejected—rejected by the courts of this country as by the European Court". Nevertheless the ruling attracted criticism that SIAC had effectively overturned the 2009 ruling of the House of Lords, at the time the highest court of the land. The Prime Minister David Cameron expressed his frustration that Abu Qatada was still in the UK.

In March 2013, Abu Qatada was rearrested after allegedly breaching his bail conditions. On 27 March, the Court of Appeal rejected the Home Secretary's appeal from the November 2012 SIAC ruling and, in April 2013, denied her leave to appeal, on the basis that "states cannot expel someone where there is a real risk that they will face a trial based on evidence obtained by torture".

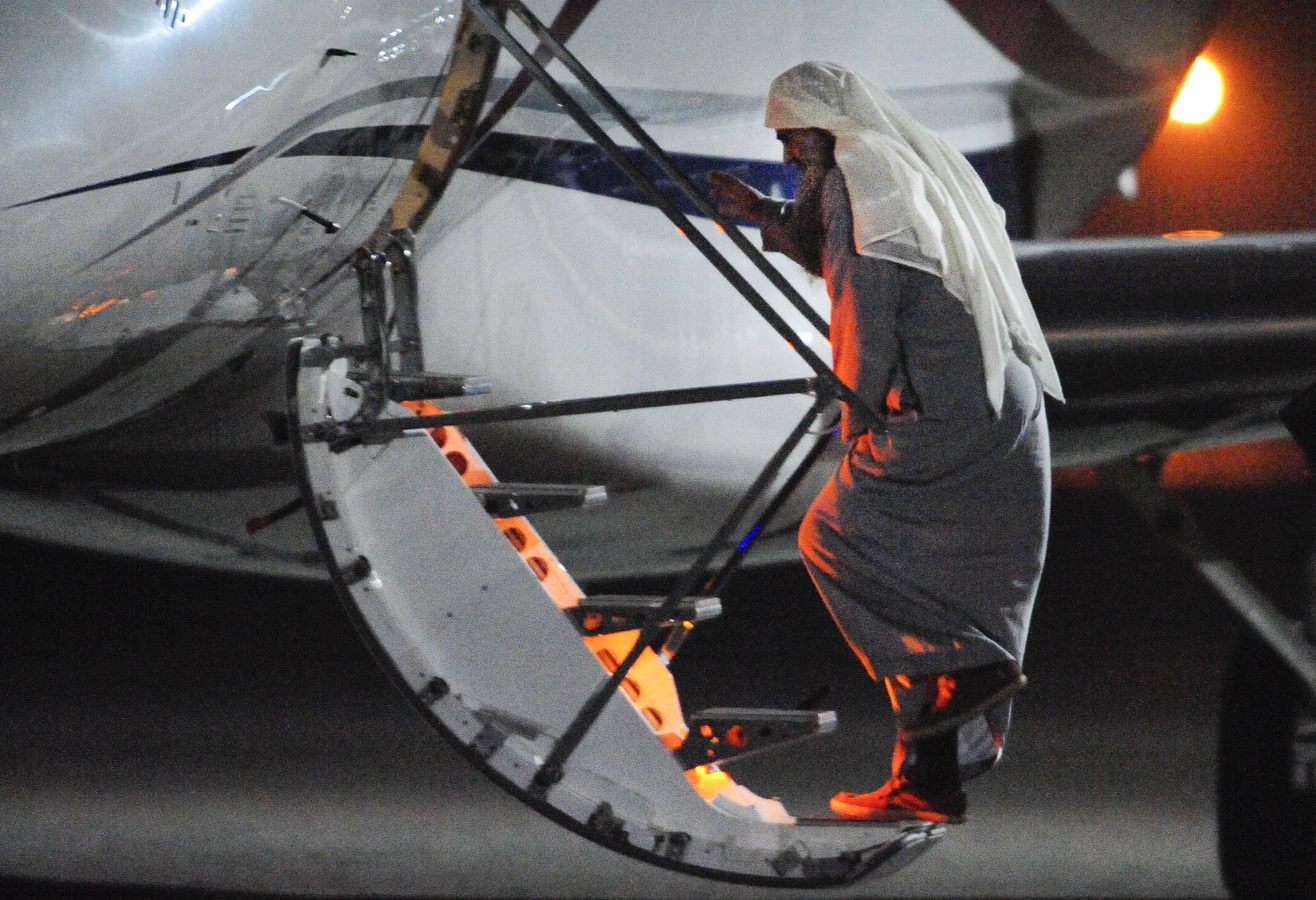
Qatada boards a plane for deportation to Jordan.

In May 2013, Abu Qatada pledged he would leave the UK if the UK and Jordanian governments agreed and ratified a treaty clarifying that evidence gained through torture would not be used against him in his forthcoming trial. On 7 July 2013, following the ratification of such a treaty, Abu Qatada was deported from the United Kingdom on a plane bound for Jordan from RAF Northolt.

Abu Qatada's struggle against deportation, and the underlying UK policy of "deportation with assurances", were documented in a study by the UK's Independent Reviewer of Terrorism Legislation.

In June 2014, a court in Jordan cleared Abu Qatada of involvement in a 1998 bombing campaign, and in September 2014 he was cleared of planning to attack millennium celebrations. He was released from prison on 24 September 2014.

== Works cited ==
- Kepel, Giles (2002). Jihad : the trail of political Islam. Harvard University Press. OCLC 48851110.
- Nesser, Petter (2013). "Abū Qatāda and Palestine". Die Welt des Islams. 53 (3–4): 416–448. doi:10.1163/15685152-5334P0005.
- "RB (Algeria) (FC) and another (Appellants) v Secretary of State for the Home Department (Respondent) OO (Jordan) (Original Respondent and Cross-appellant) v Secretary of State for the Home Department (Original Appellant and Cross-respondent)" (PDF). House of Lords. 18 February 2009.
