= Imam Mohammad Ibn Saud Islamic University =

Islamic University in Riyadh, Saudi Arabia

- جامعة الإمام محمد بن سعود الإسلامية
- Type: Public
- Established: 1974; 52 years ago
- Founders: Muhammad ibn Ibrahim Ash-Sheikh
- Rector: Ahmed bin Salem bin Mohammed Al-Ameri
- Academic staff: 4000+
- Students: 60,000+
- Location: Riyadh, Saudi Arabia; 24.814869092990563°N 46.71139425517835°E
- Campus: Urban
- Website: imamu.edu.sa/en

Imam Mohammad Ibn Saud Islamic University (IMSIU) (Arabic: جامعة الإمام محمد بن سعود الإسلامية), commonly known as Al-Imam University (IMAMU) (Arabic: إمامو), is a public university in the sub-municipality of Shemal in Riyadh, Saudi Arabia. It was founded in 1950 as an Islamic seminary by Muhammad ibn Ibrahim ash-Sheikh, the first Grand Mufti of Saudi Arabia. It was renamed the College of Sharia in 1953, before becoming a full-fledged university through amalgamations of other colleges and assuming its current name in 1974. The university also has overseas presence in Indonesia and Djibouti.

The foundation stone of its current university building was laid on 5 January 1982 during the reign of King Khalid Ibn Abdul-Aziz Al Saud. It was opened in 1990. The university includes 14 colleges, 3 higher institutes, 70 scientific institutes inside the Kingdom, and five institutes outside the Kingdom in Indonesia and Djibouti. It currently has more than 60,000 students and 4,000 faculty members.

== History ==
In 1950, King Abdulaziz assigned Muhammad ibn Ibrahim to establish an Islamic institute in Riyadh. Imam Mohammad ibn Saud Islamic University was founded in 1974. The university was named after the emir of Diriyah and founder of First Saudi State, Muhammad bin Saud Al Muqrin.

== Colleges ==
College of Engineering

- Department of Civil Engineering
- Department of Mechanical Engineering
- Department of Electrical Engineering
- Department of Chemical Engineering
- Department of Architectural Engineering

College of Medicine

- Department of Pediatrics
- Department of Internal Medicine
- Department of Educational Medicine
- Department of Pharmacology
- Department of Anatomy
- Department of Family and Community Medicine
- Department of General Surgery
- Department of Obstetrics and Gynecology
- Department of Ophthalmology
- Department of Dermatology
- Department of Anesthesiology
- Department of ENT
- Department of Public health
- Department of Clinical Neurosciences
- Department of Pathology
- Department of Biochemistry
- Department of Forensic Medicine
- Department of Emergency Medicine
- Department of Physiology

College of Computer and Information Sciences

- Department of Computer Science
- Department of Information Systems
- Department of Information Management
- Department of Information Technology

College of Sciences

- Department of Mathematics and Statistics
- Department of Physics
- Department of Chemistry
- Department of Biology

College of Economics and Administrative Sciences

- Department of Economics
- Department of Business Administration
- Department of Accounting
- Department of Finance and Investment
- Department of Banking
- Department of Insurance and Risk Management

College of Social Sciences

- Department of Psychology
- Department of Sociology and Social Service
- Department of History and Civilization
- Department of Geography

College of Arabic Language

- Department of Literature
- Department of Rhetoric, Criticism and the Methodology of Islamic Literature
- Department of Grammar and Linguistics

College of Media and Communication

- Department of Journalism and Electronic Publishing
- Department of Radio, Television and Film
- Department of Public Relations
- Department of Advertising and marketing communication
- Department of Graphics and Multimedia
- Department of Specialized Media

College of Languages and Translation

- Department of English Language and Literature

College of Sharia

- Department of Sharia And Islamic studies
- Department of Principles of Fiqh
- Department of Fiqh
- Department of Islamic Culture
- Department of Laws

College of the Fundamentals of Religion

- Department of Holy Quran and its Sciences
- Department of the Prophetic Sunnah and its Sciences
- Department of Creed and Contemporary Doctrines

College of Continuing Education and Community Services

- Department of Administrative Sciences and Humanities
- Department of applied Sciences

College of Shari’ah [Divine Legislations] and Islamic Studies, Al-Ahsa Province

- Department of Divine Laws
- Department of Fundamentals of Religion
- Department of Arabic Language
- Department of English Language
- Department of Geography
- Department of Administration
- Department of Laws
- Department of Computer Sciences and Information

College of Education

- Department of Foundations of Education
- Department of Educational Planning and Management
- Department of Curricula and Teaching Methods
- Department of Special Education

== Institutes ==
The Higher Institute of Judicial

- Department of Comparative Jurisprudence
- Department of Sharia Policy

The Higher Institute of Dawah and Ihtisaab

- Department of Preaching of Islam
- Department of Hisbah and Observation
- Department of Contemporary Islamic Studies

The Arabic Teaching Institute

- Department of Arabic Language and Islamic Sciences
- Department of Language Preparation
- Department of Applied Linguistics

== Student aid and housing ==
The university offers science and health major students 990 SR/month ($264), and humanities students 840 SR/month ($224), a 75% discount on foreign books, and fully furnished residences at the university housing/hostels complex, food within the university restaurant, free medical treatment, and full return tickets to their home country.

The university library is the Prince Sultan Library For Science and Knowledge. The library was founded in 1952, and was shared with a variety of schools in the city. The library is a partner of the World Digital Library.

== Curriculum ==
The university is organized into fourteen colleges. The fourteen colleges focus on: Shari'ah, Da'wah, Arabic, social sciences, media studies, language and translation, computer science and information science, economics and administrative sciences, formal science, medicine, and engineering. The University is home to the Institute of Translation and Arabization, a facility dedicated to the translation of Arabic texts to foreign languages, and translation of foreign language texts into Arabic (Arabization).

== Extracurricular activities ==
The university publishes a newspaper named Mir'at al-Jami`ah (Arabic: مرآة الجامعة) (English: University Mirror).

== Sports and traditions ==
Imam Mohammad bin Saud Islamic University has a football team, a volleyball team, and a stadium.

== Notable alumni ==
- Abd Al-Aziz Fawzan Al-Fawzan
- Saleh Al-Fawzan
- Saud Al-Shuraim
- Abdullah Mohammed Al-Hugail
- Mohammad Al-Hasan Al-Dido
- Ahmed Bin Taleb Bin Hameed
- Sumaya Alnasser
- Yasser Al-Dosari
- Ali Abdullah Jaber
- Khandaker Abdullah Jahangir

== See also ==
- List of Islamic educational institutions
- List of universities and colleges in Saudi Arabia
