= Salafi jihadism =

Transnational Sunni Islamist religious-political ideology

Salafi jihadism, also known as Salafi-jihadism, jihadist Salafism and revolutionary Salafism, is a religiopolitical Sunni Islamist ideology that seeks to establish a global caliphate through armed struggle. It is named for its characteristic combination of jihadism – the belief among some Muslims that armed struggle with political rivals is an efficient and theologically legitimate method of socio-political change – and Salafism, a movement to interpret sacred Islamic texts "in their most literal, traditional sense", which adherents claim will bring about the return to "true Islam".

The term "jihadist salafists" was coined by French political scientist Gilles Kepel. Kepel used it to refer to international volunteers of the jihad against the Soviet Union in Afghanistan, who, after the Soviet withdrawal and loss of American-Saudi funding, sought new paths to engage in jihad. Isolated from their national and social class origins and seeking to "rationalize" their "existence and behavior", some Arab volunteers as well as local Islamists expanded the targets of their jihad to include the United States and other countries with Muslim causes around the world.

Jihadist and Salafist elements of the new "hybrid" ideology developed by international volunteers (Arab-Afghan mujahideen) had not been joined previously because mainstream Salafis, dubbed by some Western commentators as "good Salafis", had mostly adhered to political quietism and eschewed political activities and partisan allegiances. Jihad had been viewed as potentially divisive for the broader Muslim community and as a distraction from the studying and practicing of Islam. Prominent Quietist Salafi scholars have denounced doctrines of Salafi jihadism as Bid'ah ("innovation") and "heretical", strongly forbidding Muslims from participating or assisting in any armed underground activity against any government. (Note: "Defining Salafism and Its Importance:- Foundational to understanding the threat is knowing the meaning behind key terms associated with the global Salafi-Jihadist ideology. Salafism is often conflated or misinterpreted in texts and publications. Literally, the word Salafis means 'pious forefathers,' which is most often understood to mean 'the first three generations of Muslims.' The foundation for this statement can be found in Sahih al-Bukhari's compilation, which quotes Muhammad as saying, 'The best of my community [i.e. Muslims] are my generation, then those who come after them and then whose who follow them.' Proximity to Muhammad in the temporal sense matters in that the saying and actions of the early companions of Muhammad carry greater relevance and authority. Of course, the hadiths (a written collection of traditions based on the sayings of Muhammad), and principally the compilations of al-Bukhari and Muslim are held in highest regard.[6] And how these hadiths were understood by the early community of Muslims and acted upon matters greatly. This is essential to understand because Muslims, including Salafis, do not derive their religious beliefs and practices exclusively from the Quran, but also from the hadith, making its contents just as important for Islamic theology and law. The hadiths are also the locus from which Salafi-Jihadists derive many of the violent scriptural references which they use as justification for their methodology and behavior.) Jihadist salafists often dismiss the quietist scholars as "'sheikist" traitors, portraying them as palace scholars worried about the patronage of "the oil sheiks of the Arabian peninsula" rather than pure Islam, and contend that they are not dividing the Muslim community because, in their view, the rulers of Muslim-majority countries and other self-proclaimed Muslims they attack are not actually part of the community, having deviated from Islam and become apostates or false Muslims.

Early ideologues of the movement were Arab Afghan veterans of the Afghan jihad, such as Abu Qatada al-Filistini, the naturalized Spanish Syrian Abu Musab, and Mustapha Kamel known as Abu Hamza al-Masri, among others. The jihadist ideology of Qutbism has been identified variously as the ideological foundation of the movement, a closely related Islamist ideology, or a variety of revolutionary Salafism. While Salafism had little presence in Europe during the 1980s, Salafi jihadists had by the mid-2000s acquired "a burgeoning presence in Europe, having attempted more than 30 terrorist attacks among E.U. countries since 2001". While many see the influence and activities of Salafi jihadists as in decline after 2000 (at least in the United States), others see the movement as growing in the wake of the Arab Spring, the breakdown of state control in Libya and Syria in 2014, and the U.S. withdrawal from Afghanistan in 2021.

== Definitions ==
In the words of Madawi al Rasheed, Salafi jihadism is "a hybrid construction deeply rooted in the last three decades of the twentieth century that is desperate to anchor itself in an authentic Islamic tradition, yet reflecting serious borrowing from the discourse of Western modernity".

According to Madawi Al Rasheed, ideology of Jihadi-Salafism is a post-modern hybridity whose sources can be found in the past and present, in both the Muslim world and Western world. Thus, it is the outcome of cross-fertilisation of sources that are both transnational and local, resulting in a devastating ideology that re-invents the past to induce a "cataclysmic war between two binary oppositions". Contemporary Salafi-Jihadis are primarily products of modernity rather than an extension of traditional Muslim societies. Thus, Jihadis seek to create a mimicry of the West of which they want to be part of, but reject the other leading to violence. However, more than the ideology itself, it is the circumstances that explain the appeal of Jihadis which is the real cause of violence. The traditional Mujahideen of the previous eras, such as 'Omar al-Mukhtar, 'Abd al-Qadir, al-Jaza'iri and 'Izz al-Din al-Qassam were a different category of people, products of different social circumstances who sought to liberate occupied lands from foreign imperialist and colonial penetrations. Although they gained solidarity across the Islamic World, they were not transnational actors. Salafi-Jihadis on the other hand, die for an imagined globalised faith, shares Western modernity (despite its critique), and advocate a neo-liberal free-market rationale, in their quest for a global World Order. Thus Jihadi-Salafism has as much to do with the West as with Salafism or religion in general.

Another definition of Salafi jihadism, offered by Mohammed M. Hafez, is an "extreme form of Sunni Islamism that rejects democracy and Shia rule". Hafez distinguished them from apolitical and conservative Salafi scholars (such as Muhammad Nasiruddin al-Albani, Muhammad ibn al Uthaymeen, Abd al-Aziz ibn Baz, Wasiullah Abbas, Zubair Ali Zai, and Abdul-Azeez ibn Abdullaah Aal ash-Shaikh) but also from the sahwa movement associated with Salman al-Ouda or Safar Al-Hawali. According to Michael Horowitz, Salafi jihad is an ideology that identifies the "alleged source of the Muslims' conundrum" in the "persistent attacks and humiliation of Muslims on the part of an anti-Islamic alliance of what it terms 'Crusaders', 'Zionists', and 'apostates'." The concept was described by the American-Israeli scholar Martin Kramer as an academic term that "will inevitably be [simplified to] jihadism or the jihadist movement in popular usage."

== Tenets ==
According to political scientist Gilles Kepel, Salafist jihadism combined "respect for the sacred texts in their most literal form, ... with an absolute commitment to jihad, whose number-one target had to be America, perceived as the greatest enemy of the faith." 13th-century Hanbalite jurist Taqi al-Din Ahmad ibn Taymiyya (1328 C.E/ 728 A.H), a maverick cleric known for his fierce anti-Mongol stances, is the most authoritative classical theologian in Salafi-jihadist discourse.

According to Mohammed M. Hafez, contemporary jihadi Salafism is characterized by "five features":

- immense emphasis on the concept of tawhid (unity of God);
- God's sovereignty (hakimiyyat Allah), which defines right and wrong, good and evil, and which supersedes human reasoning is applicable in all places on earth and at all times, and makes unnecessary and un-Islamic other ideologies such as liberalism or humanism;
- the rejection of all religious innovation (bid‘ah) in Islam;
- the permissibility and necessity of takfir (the declaring of a Muslim to be outside the creed, so that they may face execution);
- and on the centrality of jihad against infidel regimes.

Another researcher, Thomas Hegghammer, has outlined five objectives shared by jihadis:

- Changing the social and political organisation of the state (an example, being the Armed Islamic Group (GIA) and the former Salafist Group for Preaching and Combat (GSPC) which fought to overthrow the Algerian state and replace it with an Islamic state).
- Establishing sovereignty on a territory perceived as occupied or dominated by non-Muslims (an example being the Pakistan-based Lashkar-e-Taiba (Soldiers of the Pure) in Indian-administered Kashmir and the Caucasus Emirate in the Russian Federation).
- Defending the Muslim community (ummah) from external non-Muslim perceived threats, either the "near enemy" (al-adou al-qarib, this includes jihadists Arabs who travelled to Bosnia and Chechnya to defend local Muslims against non-Muslim armies) or the "far enemy" (al-adou al-baid, often affiliates of Al-Qaeda attacking the West).
- Correcting other Muslims' moral behaviour. (In Indonesia, vigilantes first used sticks and stones to attack those they considered "deviant" in behavior before moving on to guns and bombs.)
- Intimidating and marginalising other Muslim sects (an example being Lashkar-e-Jhangvi which has carried out violent attacks on Pakistani Shia for decades, and killings in Iraq).

Robin Wright notes the importance in Salafi jihadist groups of

- the formal process of taking an oath of allegiance (Bay'ah) to a leader. (This can be by individuals to an emir or by a local group to a transglobal group.)
- "marbling", i.e. pretending to cut ties to a less-than-popular global movement when "strategically or financially convenient". (An example is the cutting of ties to al-Qaeda by the Syrian group Al-Nusra Front with al-Qaeda's approval.)

Al Jazeera journalist Jamal Al Sharif describes Salafi jihadism as combining "the doctrinal content and approach of Salafism and organisational models from Muslim Brotherhood organisations. Their motto emerged as 'Salafism in doctrine, modernity in confrontation'".

== Differences from Quietist and Islamist Salafism ==
Much of Salafi-Jihadist discourse borrows heavily from Sayyid Qutb's concept of jahiliyya (pre-Islamic ignorance), hakimiyya (Sovereignty of God) and takfir (excommunication). Prominent contemporary ideologues of Salafi jihadism, such as Abu Muhammad al-Maqdisi and Abu Qatada al Filistini, drew heavily from the works of Sayyid Qutb and adopted concepts of Al-Wala wal Bara from his writings. Maqdisi's interpretation of Al-Wala wal Bara marked a distinct shift from traditional Salafi theology by introducing Takfiri principles to it. Adopting a binary world-view, Maqdisi excommunicated contemporary governments in the Muslim World and their collaborators as apostates. Salafi Jihadists also reject democracy as it contradicts their interpretation of Hakimiyya. Salafi Islamists, while supporting revolutions to topple authoritarian regimes, permit the participation in democratic systems across the world to Islamize the political order through the existing structures. These revolutionary Islamist doctrines advocating violent overthrow of the existing political order, is seen as heretical by Quietist Salafis.

Salafi jihadists distinguish themselves from Quietist salafis whom they label "sheikist", so named because – the jihadists believe – that the "sheikists" had forsaken adoration of God for adoration of "the oil sheiks of the Arabian peninsula, with the Al Saud family at their head". Principal among the sheikist scholars was Abd al-Aziz ibn Baz – "the archetypal court ulema [ulama al-balat]". These allegedly "false" salafi "had to be striven against and eliminated", but even more infuriating was the Salafi Islamists of the Muslim Brotherhood, whom the Salafi jihadists considered excessively moderate and lacking in a stricter literalist interpretation of holy texts.

Quietist Salafi scholarship in turn, denounce Salafi jihadism as a heterodox ideology far-removed from Salafi orthodoxy. Quietist Salafi scholars such as Albani, Ibn Uthaymeen, Ibn Baz, Saleh Al-Fawzan, and Muqbil ibn Hadi condemned rebellion against the rulers as "the most corrupt of innovations", and forbade Muslims "to take it upon himself to execute a ruling" which is under the jurisdiction of the rulers. (Note: "Defining Salafism and Its Importance:- Foundational to understanding the threat is knowing the meaning behind key terms associated with the global Salafi-Jihadist ideology. Salafism is often conflated or misinterpreted in texts and publications. Literally, the word Salafis means 'pious forefathers,' which is most often understood to mean 'the first three generations of Muslims.' The foundation for this statement can be found in Sahih al-Bukhari's compilation, which quotes Muhammad as saying, 'The best of my community [i.e. Muslims] are my generation, then those who come after them and then whose who follow them.' Proximity to Muhammad in the temporal sense matters in that the saying and actions of the early companions of Muhammad carry greater relevance and authority. Of course, the hadiths (a written collection of traditions based on the sayings of Muhammad), and principally the compilations of al-Bukhari and Muslim are held in highest regard, And how these hadiths were understood by the early community of Muslims and acted upon matters greatly. This is essential to understand because Muslims, including Salafis, do not derive their religious beliefs and practices exclusively from the Quran, but also from the hadith, making its contents just as important for Islamic theology and law. The hadiths are also the locus from which Salafi-Jihadists derive many of the violent scriptural references which they use as justification for their methodology and behavior.) Salafi jihadists contend that they are not dividing the Muslim community because, in their view, the rulers of Muslim-majority countries and other self-proclaimed Muslims they attack have deviated from Islam and are actually apostates or false Muslims.

Quietist Salafis criticize Al-Qaeda and Islamic State as Qutbists and often label Salafi Islamists as "Surooris". According to them, these organizations are directly opposed to Salafiyya and its manhaj (methodology). Major doctrines of the Salafi Jihadist movement have its roots in early heterodox sects such as the Kharijites. As a result, heavy creedal disparities exist between traditional Salafis and Salafi Jihadists. Mainstream Salafism, which consists of both quietist and political Salafis, reject the violence of Jihadists. Major Purist Salafi ulema condemn certain Salafi-jihadist organisations as Kharijites.

== History ==
=== Origins ===
The Egyptian Islamist movements of 1950s are generally considered to be the precursors of contemporary Salafi-Jihadist movements. The theological doctrines of the Syrian-Egyptian Islamic scholar Sayyid Rashid Rida (1865–1935 CE) greatly influenced these movements. Amongst his notable ideas included reviving the traditions of the early Muslim generations (Salaf) as well ridding the Islamic World of Western influences and Jahiliyya by specifically looking up to the model of Khulafa Rashidun. Rida's ideas would set the foundations of future Salafi-Jihadist movements and greatly influence Islamists like Hasan al-Banna, Sayyid Qutb, and other Islamic fundamentalist figures. Rashid Rida fervently opposed Western ideas and foreign influences, and his activities were focused on overturning the encroachment of secular laws across the Muslim World following the First World War. Rida believed that deference to man-made laws was tantamount to the polytheism of "Jahiliyya" and campaigned for the re-establishment of a Sunni Caliphate that would unite the Muslims. Only this, Rida asserted, alongside the "return to true and pure Islam" exemplified by the tenets of the Salafiyya movement; could liberate Muslim World from colonialism and restore past Islamic glory. Rida's treatises laid the theological framework of future militants who would eventually establish the Salafi-Jihadi movement.

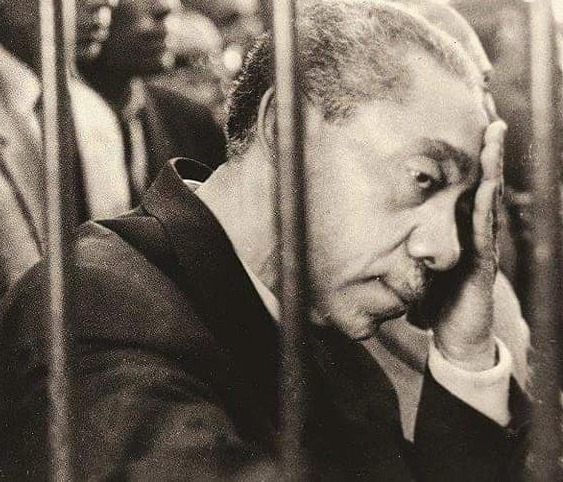
The revolutionary ideals advocated by Islamist scholar Sayyid Qutb through his prison-writings constitute the ideological basis of the Salafi-Jihadi movement

Fore-runners of Salafi jihadism principally includes Egyptian militant Islamist scholar and theoretician Sayyid Qutb, who developed "the intellectual underpinnings", in the 1950s, for what would later become the doctrine of most Jihadist organizations around the world, including Al-Qaeda and ISIS. Going radically further than his predecessors, Qutb called upon Muslims to form an ideologically committed vanguard that would wage armed Jihad against the secular and Western-allied governments in the Arab World, until the restoration of Islamic rule. Sayyid Qutb's brother, Muhammad Qutb was one of Osama bin Laden's teachers at university. Sayyid Qutb has been described as "Al-Qaeda's Philosopher". Ayman al Zawahiri, the Egyptian who was second in command and co-founder of Al-Qaeda, called Qutb, "the most prominent theoretician of the fundamentalist movements".

In his writings, both before and after joining the Muslim Brotherhood Qutb argued that the Muslim world had reached a crisis point and that the Islamic world has been replaced by pagan ignorance of Jahiliyyah, (which directly translates to "ignorance", a term used by Muslims to describe the "dark" ages of pre-Islamic Arabia). When Qutb went abroad for a two-year scholarship to the United States, it is said he came back with extremist radical beliefs. He used what's been often described by scholars as his "genuine literary excellence" to spread these views of western criticism to form the main intellectual doctrine for the Muslim Brotherhood, which later be adopted by most terrorist organizations worldwide.

Qutbism doctrine of Islam interpretation emphasizes how the secular, infidel Muslim leaders and populations have fallen to imitating the western way of life, and that before any prosperity would occur, the Muslim world must revert to the Caliphate-age Shari'ah Law instead of "Man-made laws". He issued ideological & religious debates stating that the violent means are justifiable under Islamic Law for an end as great as returning the Islamic State "days of glory", and these means are often leading a victorious violent holy war (Jihad) against the West.

A part of his writings which have influenced Islamists and terrorist organizations on the nature of The West, can be found in his book "The America that I Have Seen", which he wrote immediately after returning to Egypt from the United States. In it he complained of Western materialism, individual freedoms, economic system, racism, brutal boxing matches, "poor" haircuts, superficiality in conversations and friendships, restrictions on divorce, enthusiasm for sports, lack of artistic feeling, "animal-like" mixing of the sexes (which "went on even in churches"), and strong support for the new Israeli state.

He was appalled by what he perceived as loose sexual openness of American men and women. Qutb noted with disapproval the openly displayed sexuality of American women stating in the same influential book The America that I Have Seen:

the American girl is well acquainted with her body's seductive capacity. She knows it lies in the face, and in expressive eyes, and thirsty lips. She knows seductiveness lies in the round breasts, the full buttocks, and in the shapely thighs, sleek legs – and she shows all this and does not hide it.

On 29 August 1966, Sayyid Qutb was executed by hanging by Egyptian president's Gamal Abdel-Nasser's regime for his alleged role in the president's assassination plot. This would later paint him as an Islamic martyr or shahid (he is often called "Shahid Sayyid Qutb" or Sayyid Qutb al-Shahid by admirers) among supporters & Islamist circles, particularly as the trial was alleged to be a show trial. Qutb wrote his major Islamist works (a commentary of the Qur'an, Fi Zilal al-Qur'an (In the Shade of the Qur'an), and a manifesto of political Islam called Ma'alim fi-l-Tariq (Milestones), while incarcerated and allegedly tortured. This, alongside his allegedly extrajudicial execution, elevated the value of these two major writings, giving his radical, violent Islamist doctrine in his writings a stronger influence over future terrorist organizations.

=== Evolution of Salafi jihadism ===
During the Cold War, the United States and the United Kingdom, launched covert and overt campaigns to encourage and strengthen fundamentalist groups in the Middle East and southern Asia. These groups were seen as a hedge against potential expansion by the Soviet Union, and as a counterweight against nationalist and socialist movements that were seen as a threat to the interests of the Western nations.

In a 2018 interview with The Washington Post, Mohammed bin Salman, the de facto ruler of Saudi Arabia, said that Saudi Arabia's International propagation of the Salafi movement and Wahhabism campaign was "rooted in the Cold War, when allies asked Saudi Arabia to use its resources to prevent inroads in Muslim countries by the Soviet Union." According to some estimates, between the 1960s and 2016, the Saudis funnelled over US$100 billion to spread Wahhabi Salafi Islam. According to political scientist Alex Alexiev, the impetus for the international propagation of Salafism and Wahhabism was "the largest worldwide propaganda campaign ever mounted", David A. Kaplan described it as "dwarfing the Soviets' propaganda efforts at the height of the Cold War". In 2013, the European Parliament identified Wahhabism as the main source of global terrorism.

The crushing defeat of various Arab states in the 1967 Six-Day War led to the de-legitimization of socialist and nationalist ideologies across the Arab world. Their demise provided a fertile ground for the Salafiyya movement, which spread across the Arab world as well as the wider Islamic world. The rise of oil industry in Gulf states also brought in a large-workforce. The workforce embraced Salafi doctrines and founded Salafi organisations as they returned to their home-countries.

Beginning from 1970s, various Islamist and Jihadist factions attempted to idealize traditional Salafiyya, recasting it as a totalizing political system based on the doctrines of Sayyid Qutb. Majority of Salafis traditionally viewed Salafiyya as a scholarly movement that revived the religious faith of Muslims through teaching and devout adherence to Islamic decrees. Additionally, they advocated Salafism to remain uncontaminated from politics. However, a minority sought the establishment of an Islamic system through violent means, based on Sayyid Qutb's concepts of Hakimiyya (Sovereignty of God). They advocated a global Jihad, with clear political overtones, to fight for Muslim liberation across national boundaries. This movement came to be known as Salafi-Jihadism. Groups like Takfir wal-Hijra, who kidnapped and murdered an Egyptian ex-government minister in 1978, also inspired some of "the tactics and methods" used by Al Qaeda.

=== Expansion ===
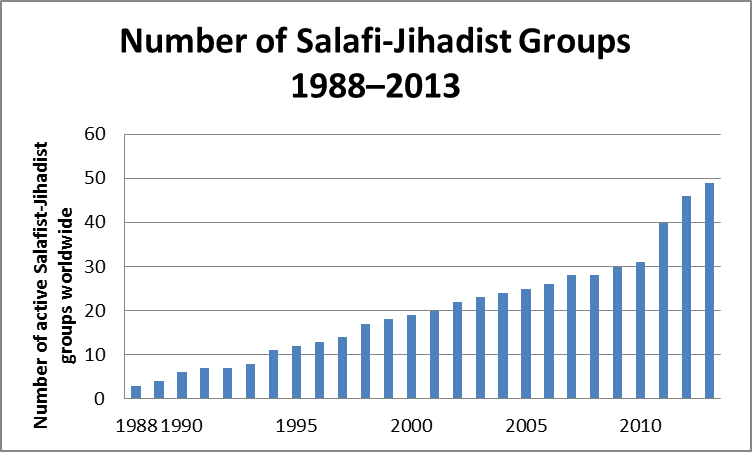
(Data from A Persistent Threat, The Evolution of al Qa'ida and Other Salafi Jihadists, Seth G. Jones, 2014, Figure 3.1)

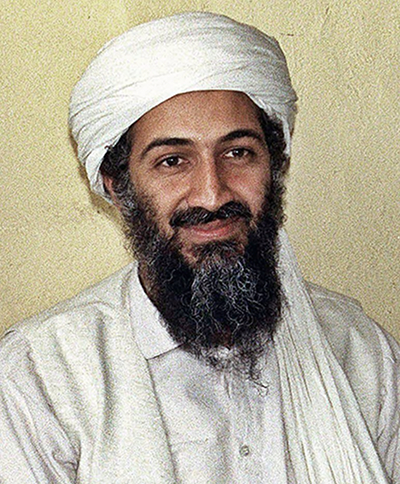
Osama bin Laden, founder of the Salafi jihadist organization al-Qaeda

Gilles Kepel writes that the Salafis whom he encountered in Europe in the 1980s, were "totally apolitical". However, by the mid-1990s, he met some who felt jihad in the form of "violence and terrorism" was "justified to realize their political objectives". The mingling of many Salafists who were alienated from mainstream European society with violent jihadists created "a volatile mixture".

In the 1990s, militant Islamists of the al-Jama'a al-Islamiyya were active in the terrorist attacks on police, government officials, and foreign tourists in Egypt, and the Armed Islamic Group of Algeria was a principal extremist group in the Algerian Civil War. In Afghanistan, the Taliban were adherents of the Deobandi, not the Salafi school of Islam, but they closely co-operated with bin Laden and various Salafi-jihadist leaders. CIA officer Marc Sageman described Salafi jihadism as a "Muslim revivalist social movement" with "roots in Egypt". According to Sageman, Salafi Jihadists are influenced by the strategy of prominent Islamist Egyptians such as Sayyid Qutb and Muhammad 'Abd al-Salam Faraj, who advocated the revolutionary overthrow of secular regimes through Jihad and the establishment of Islamic states.

In his research, Seth Jones of the Rand Corporation finds that Salafi-jihadist numbers and activity have increased from 2007 to 2013. According to his research:

- the number of Salafi jihadist groups increased by over 50% from 2010 to 2013, using Libya and parts of Syria as sanctuary.
- the number of Salafi jihadist fighters "more than doubled from 2010 to 2013" using both low and high estimates. The war in Syria was the single most important attraction for Salafi-jihadist fighters.
- attacks by al-Qaeda–affiliated groups (Islamic State of Iraq and the Levant, al Shabaab, Jabhat al-Nusrah, and al-Qaeda in the Arabian Peninsula)
- despite al-Qaeda's traditional focus on the "far enemy" (US and Europe), approximately 99% of the attacks by al-Qaeda and its affiliates in 2013 were against "near enemy" targets (in North Africa, the Middle East, and other regions outside of the West).

== Leaders, groups and activities ==
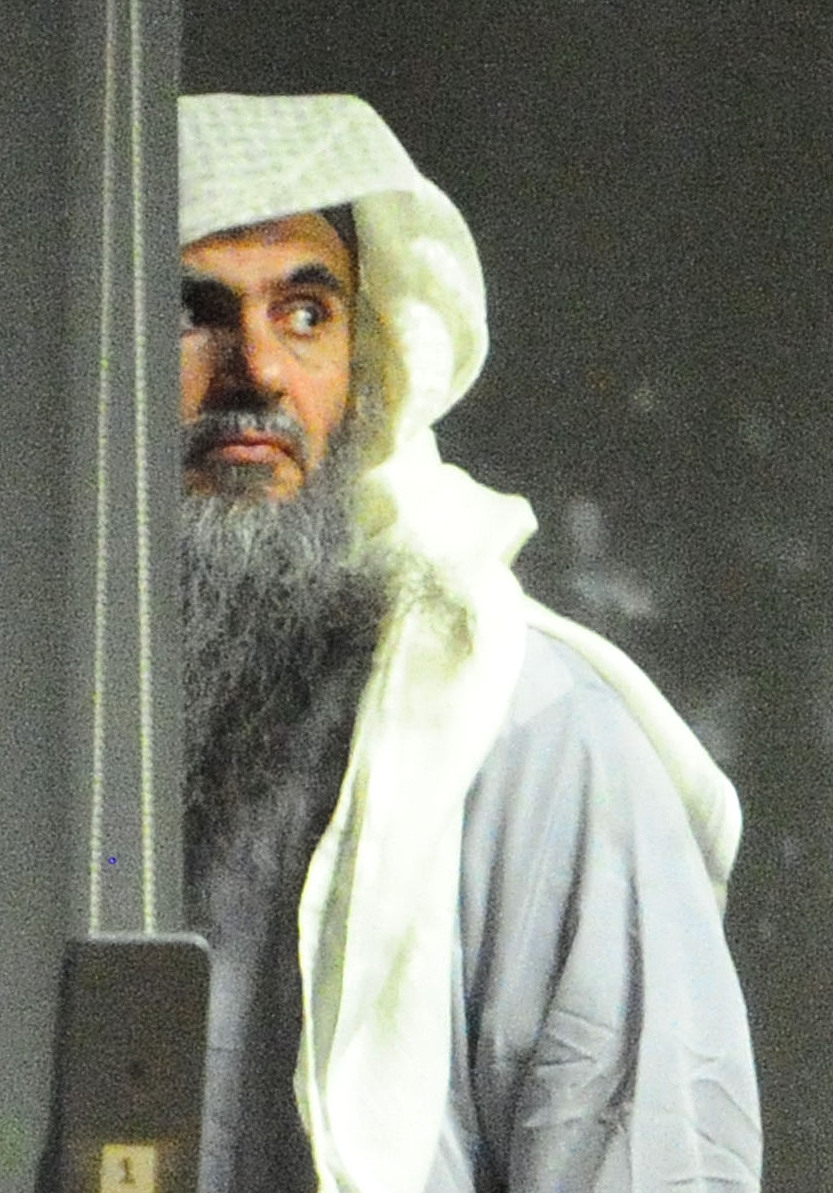
Islamic cleric Abu Qatada al-Falastini

=== Leaders ===
"Theoreticians" of Salafist jihadism included Afghan jihad veterans such as the Palestinian Abu Qatada, the Syrian Mustafa Setmariam Nasar, the Egyptian Mustapha Kamel, known as Abu Hamza al-Masri. Osama bin Laden was its most well-known leader. The dissident Saudi preachers Salman al-Ouda and Safar Al-Hawali, were held in high esteem by this school. Al Qaeda leader Ayman Al Zawahiri would praise Sayyid Qutb, stating that Qutb's call formed the ideological inspiration for the contemporary Salafi-Jihadist movement. Other leading figures in the movement include Anwar al-Awlaki, former leader of Al-Qaeda in the Arabian Peninsula (AQAP); Abu Bakar Bashir, leader of the banned Indonesian militant group (Jema'ah Islamiyah); Nasir al-Fahd, Saudi Arabian Salafi-Jihadist scholar who opposes the Saudi state, and reportedly pledged allegiance to ISIS; Mohammed Yusuf, the founder of the Nigerian Boko Haram; Omar Bakri Muhammad, Abu Bakr al-Baghdadi, leader of terrorist group Islamic State of Iraq and Levant; etc.

=== Development ===
Murad al-Shishani of The Jamestown Foundation states there have been three generations of Salafi-jihadists: those waging jihad in Afghanistan, Bosnia and Iraq. As of the mid-2000s, Arab fighters in Iraq were "the latest and most important development of the global Salafi-jihadi movement". These fighters were usually not Iraqis, but volunteers who had come to Iraq from other countries, mainly Saudi Arabia. Unlike in earlier Salafi jihadi actions, Egyptians "are no longer the chief ethnic group". According to Bruce Livesey Salafist jihadists are currently a "burgeoning presence in Europe, having attempted more than 30 terrorist attacks among EU countries" from September 2001 to the beginning of 2005".

According to Mohammed M. Hafez, in Iraq jihadi salafi are pursuing a "system-collapse strategy" whose goal is to install an "Islamic emirate based on Salafi dominance, similar to the Taliban regime in Afghanistan." In addition to occupation/coalition personnel they target mainly Iraqi security forces and Shia civilians, but also "foreign journalists, translators and transport drivers and the economic and physical infrastructure of Iraq."

=== Groups ===
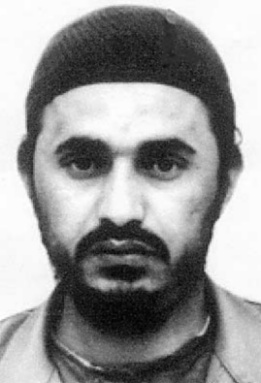
Abu Mus'ab al-Zarqawi, Emir of al-Qaeda in Iraq and prominent Islamist leader who was killed during the anti-American insurgency in Iraq, is widely regarded as an influential figure by Salafi Jihadists

Salafist jihadist groups include Al Qaeda, the now defunct Algerian Armed Islamic Group (GIA), and the Egyptian group Al-Gama'a al-Islamiyya which still exists.

In the Algerian Civil War 1992–1998, the GIA was one of the two major Islamist armed groups (the other being the Armee Islamique du Salut or AIS) fighting the Algerian army and security forces. The GIA included veterans of the Afghanistan jihad and unlike the more moderate AIS, fought to destabilize the Algerian government with terror attacks designed to "create an atmosphere of general insecurity". It considered jihad in Algeria fard ayn or an obligation for all (sane adult male) Muslims, and sought to "purge" Algeria of "the ungodly" and create an Islamic state. It pursued what Gilles Kepel called "wholesale massacres of civilians", targeting French-speaking intellectuals, foreigners, and Islamists deemed too moderate, and took its campaign of bombing to France, which supported the Algerian government against the Islamists. Although over 150,000 were killed in the civil war, the GIA eventually lost popular support and was crushed by the security forces. Remnants of the GIA continued on as "Salafist Group for Preaching and Combat", which as of 2015 calls itself al-Qaeda in the Islamic Maghreb.

Al-Gama'a al-Islamiyya, (the Islamic Group) another Salafist-jihadi movement fought an insurgency against the Egyptian government from 1992 to 1998 during which at least 800 Egyptian policemen and soldiers, jihadists, and civilians were killed. Outside of Egypt it is best known for a November 1997 attack at the Temple of Hatshepsut in Luxor where fifty-eight foreign tourists trapped inside the temple were hunted down and hacked and shot to death. The group declared a ceasefire in March 1999, although as of 2012 it is still active in jihad against the Ba'athist Syrian regime.

Flag of al-Qaeda

Perhaps the most famous and effective Salafist jihadist group was Al-Qaeda. Al-Qaeda evolved from the Maktab al-Khidamat (MAK), or the "Services Office", a Muslim organization founded in 1984 to raise and channel funds and recruit foreign mujahideen for the war against the Soviets in Afghanistan. It was established in Peshawar, Pakistan, by Osama bin Laden and Abdullah Yusuf Azzam. As it became apparent that the jihad had compelled the Soviet military to abandon its mission in Afghanistan, some mujahideen called for the expansion of their operations to include Islamist struggles in other parts of the world, and Al Qaeda was formed by bin Laden on August 11, 1988. Members were to making a pledge (bayat) to follow one's superiors. Al-Qaeda emphasized jihad against the "far enemy", by which it meant the United States. In 1996, it announced its jihad to expel foreign troops and interests from what they considered Islamic lands, and in 1998, it issued a fatwa calling on Muslims to kill Americans and their allies whenever and wherever they could. Among its most notable acts of violence were the 1998 bombings of US embassies in Dar es Salaam and Nairobi that killed over 200 people; and the 9/11 attacks of 2001 that killed almost 3,000 people and caused many billions of dollars in damage.

According to Mohammed M. Hafez, "as of 2006 the two major groups within the jihadi Salafi camp" in Iraq were the Mujahidin Shura Council and the Ansar al Sunna Group. There are also a number of small jihadist Salafist groups in Azerbaijan.

The group leading the Islamist insurgency in Southern Thailand in 2006 by carrying out most of the attacks and cross-border operations, BRN-Koordinasi, favours Salafi ideology. It works in a loosely organized strictly clandestine cell system dependent on hard-line religious leaders for direction.

Jund Ansar Allah is, or was, an armed Salafist jihadist organization in the Gaza Strip. On August 14, 2009, the group's spiritual leader, Sheikh Abdel Latif Moussa, announced during Friday sermon the establishment of an Islamic emirate in the Palestinian territories attacking the ruling authority, the Islamist group Hamas, for failing to enforce Sharia law. Hamas forces responded to his sermon by surrounding his Ibn Taymiyyah mosque complex and attacking it. In the fighting that ensued, 24 people (including Sheikh Abdel Latif Moussa himself) were killed and over 130 were wounded.

In 2011, Salafist jihadists were actively involved with protests against King Abdullah II of Jordan, and the kidnapping and killing of Italian peace activist Vittorio Arrigoni in Hamas-controlled Gaza Strip.

In the North Caucasus region of Russia, the Caucasus Emirate replaced the nationalism of Muslim Chechnya and Dagestan with a hard-line Salafist-takfiri jihadist ideology. They are immensely focused on upholding the concept of tawhid (purist monotheism), and fiercely reject any practice of shirk, taqlid, ijtihad and bid‘ah. They also believe in the complete separation between the Muslim and the non-Muslim, by propagating Al Wala' Wal Bara' and declaring takfir against any Muslim who (they believe) is a mushrik (polytheist) and does not return to the observance of tawhid and the strict literal interpretation of the Quran and the Sunnah as followed by Muhammad and his companions (Sahaba).

Flag of the Islamic State of Iraq and the Levant

In Syria and Iraq both Jabhat al-Nusra and ISIS have been described as Salafist-jihadist. Jabhat al-Nusra has been described as possessing "a hard-line Salafi-Jihadist ideology" and being one of "the most effective" groups fighting the regime. Writing after ISIS victories in Iraq, Hassan Hassan believes ISIS is a reflection of "ideological shakeup of Sunni Islam's traditional Salafism" since the Arab Spring, where salafism, "traditionally inward-looking and loyal to the political establishment", has "steadily, if slowly", been eroded by Salafism-jihadism.

Boko Haram in Nigeria is a Salafi jihadism group that has killed tens of thousands of people, displaced 2.3 million from their homes,

== Activities in Europe ==
=== France ===
In France, in 2015 police say that Salafism is represented in 90 out of 2500 investigated religious communities, which was double the number compared to five years earlier. In November and December 2016, authorities closed four salafist mosque in Ecquevilly, the El Islah mosque in Villiers-sur-Marne and two in Seine-Saint-Denis (Clichy-sous-Bois and Stains).

In December 2017, a Salafi-Jihadist mosque in Marseille was closed by authorities for preaching about violent jihad. In August 2018, after the European Court of Human Rights approved the decision, French authorities deported the Salafi-Jihadist preacher Elhadi Doudi to his home country Algeria because of his radical messages he spread in Marseille.

=== Germany ===
According to Deutsche Welle, Salafism is a growing movement in Germany whose aim of a Caliphate is incompatible with a Western democracy. According to the German Federal Agency for Civic Education, nearly all Islamist terrorists are Salafists, but not all Salafists are terrorists. Therefore, the agency evaluated the Salafist movement beyond the actions by Salafists and analysed the ideological framework of Salafism which is in conflict with the minimal foundations of a democratic and open society. Salafists calling for the death penalty for apostasy is in conflict with freedom of religion. The dualistic view on "true believers" and "false believers" in practice means people being treated unequally on religious grounds. The call for a religious state in the form of a caliphate means that Salafists reject the rule of law and the sovereignty of the people's rule. The Salafist view on gender and society leads to discrimination and the subjugation of women.

Estimates by German interior intelligence service show that it grew from 3,800 members in 2011 to 7,500 members in 2015. In Germany, most of the recruitment to the movement is done on the Internet and also on the streets, a propaganda drive which mostly attracts youth. There are two ideological camps, one advocates Salafi-Activism and directs its recruitment efforts towards non-Muslims and non-Salafist Muslims to gain influence in society. The other and minority movement, the jihadist Salafism, advocates gaining influence by the use of violence and nearly all identified terrorist cells in Germany came from Salafist circles.

In 2015, Sigmar Gabriel, Vice-Chancellor of Germany, spoke out, saying "We need Saudi Arabia to solve the regional conflicts, but we must at the same time make clear that the time to look away is past. Wahhabi mosques are financed all over the world by Saudi Arabia. In Germany, many dangerous Islamists come from these communities." In November 2016, nationwide raids were conducted on the Salafi-Islamist True Religion organization.

According to the German Federal Office for the Protection of the Constitution in Cologne, the number of Salafists in Germany grew from 9,700 in December 2016 to 10,800 in December 2017. In addition to the rise, the Salafist movement in Germany was increasingly fractured which made them harder to monitor by authorities. According to the office, street distributions of Quran took place less frequently which was described as a success for the authorities. Radicalisation changed character, from taking place in mosques and interregional Salafist organisations to more often happening in small circles, which increasingly formed on the internet. A further development was a rise in participation of women. According to the FFGI at Goethe University Frankfurt, wahhabist ideology is spread in Germany as in other European country mostly by an array of informal, personal and organisational networks, where organisations closely associated with the government of Saudi Arabia such as the Muslim World League (WML) and the World Association of Muslim Youth are actively participating.

In February 2017, the German Salafist mosque organisation Berliner Fussilet-Moscheeverein was banned by authorities. Anis Amri, the perpetrator of the 2016 Berlin truck attack, was said to be among its visitors. In March 2017, the German Muslim community organisation Deutschsprachige Islamkreis Hildesheim was also banned after investigators found that its members were preparing to travel to the conflict zone in Syria to fight for the Islamic State. According to the Federal Agency for Civic Education, these examples show that certain Salafist mosques not only concern themselves with religious matters, but also prepare serious crimes and terrorist activities.

=== Sweden ===
Representatives from the mosque in Gävle are promoting this variant of Islam, which is considered extreme in Sweden. According to researcher Aje Carlbom at Malmö University the organisation which is behind the missionary work is the Swedish United Dawah Center, abbreviated SUDC. SUDC is characterised as a salafist group by a researcher of religious history at Stockholm University and it has many links to the British Muslim Abdur Raheem Green. According to professor Mohammed Fazlhashemi, Salafi-Jihadists oppose rational theology and they hate Shia Muslims most of all. Three Muslim community organisations in Malmö reportedly invited antisemitic and homophobic Salafist lecturers such as Salman al-Ouda. One of the organisations, Alhambra is a student society at Malmö University.

In Hässleholm the Ljusets moské (translated: "mosque of the light") is spreading Salafi ideology and portray Shia Muslims as apostates and traitors in social media while the atrocities of the Islamic state are never mentioned. In 2009 the imam Abu al-Hareth at the mosque was sentenced to six years in jail for the attempted murder of a local Shia Muslim from Iraq and another member set fire to a Shia mosque in Malmö. In 2017, Swedish Security Police reported that the number of jihadists in Sweden had risen to thousands from about 200 in 2010. Based on social media analysis, an increase was noted in 2013. According to police in Sweden, Salafist-Jihadists affect the communities where they are active.

According to Swedish researcher Magnus Ranstorp, Salafi-Jihadism is antidemocratic, homophobic and aims to subjugate women and is therefore opposed to a societal order founded on democracy. According to Anas Khalifa, the Salafi movement is present at nearly every major mosque in Sweden "in some form".

=== United Kingdom ===
The report found that Middle Eastern nations are providing financial support to mosques and Islamic educational institutions, which have been linked to the spread of Salafi-Jihadist materials which expoused "an illiberal, bigoted" ideology.

== List of groups ==
According to Seth G. Jones at the RAND Corporation, as of 2014, there were around 50 Salafist-jihadist groups in existence or recently in existence ("present" in the list indicates a group's continued existence as of 2014). (Jones defines Salafi-jihadist groups as those groups which emphasize the importance of returning to a "pure" form of Islam, the form of Islam which was practiced by the Salaf, the pious ancestors; and those groups which believe that violent jihad is fard 'ayn (a personal religious duty).

Salafist-jihadist groups as of 2014
Name of group	Base of operations	Years
Abdullah Azzam Brigades (Yusuf al-Uyayri Battalions)	Saudi Arabia	2009–2015
Abdullah Azzam Brigades (Ziyad al-Jarrah Battalions)	Lebanon	2009–2015
Abu Sayyaf Group (ASG)	Philippines	1991–present
Aden-Abyan Islamic Army (AAIA)	Yemen	1994–2009
Al-Itihaad al-Islamiya (AIAI)	Somalia, Ethiopia	1994–2002
Al-Qaeda (core)	Unknown	1988–present
Al-Qaeda in Aceh (a.k.a. Tanzim al Qa'ida Indonesia for Serambi Makkah)	Indonesia	2009–2011
Al-Qaeda in the Arabian Peninsula (Saudi Arabia)	Saudi Arabia	2002–2008
Al Qaeda in the Arabian Peninsula (Yemen)	Yemen	2008–present
al-Qaeda in the Islamic Maghreb (AQIM, formerly the Salafist Group for Preaching and Combat, GSPC)	Algeria	1998–present
Al Takfir wal al-Hijrah	Egypt (Sinai Peninsula)	2011–present
Al-Mulathamun (Mokhtar Belmokhtar)	Mali, Libya, Algeria	2012–2013
Al-Murabitun (Mokhtar Belmokhtar)	Mali, Libya, Algeria	2013–2017
Alliance for the Re-liberation of Somalia- Union of Islamic Courts (ARS/UIC)	Somalia, Eritrea	2006–2009
Ansar al-Islam	Iraq	2001–2003
Ansar al-Sharia (Egypt)	Egypt	2012–2018
Ansar al-Sharia (Libya)	Libya	2012–2017
Ansar al-Sharia (Mali)	Mali	2012–present
Ansar al-Sharia (Tunisia)	Tunisia	2011–2022
Ansar Bait al-Maqdis (a.k.a. Ansar Jerusalem)	Gaza Strip, Egypt (Sinai Peninsula)	2012–2014
Ansaru	Nigeria	2012–present
Osbat al-Ansar (AAA)	Lebanon	1985–present
Bangsamoro Islamic Freedom Fighters (BIFF, a.k.a. BIFM)	Philippines	2010–present
Boko Haram	Nigeria	2003–present
Chechen Republic of Ichkeria (Basayev faction)	Russia (Chechnya)	1994–2007
East Turkestan Islamic Movement (ETIM, a.k.a. Turkestan Islamic Party)	China (Xinjiang)	1989–present
Egyptian Islamic Jihad (EIJ)	Egypt	1978–2001
Harakat al-Shabaab al-Mujahideen	Somalia	2002–present
Harakat al-Shuada'a al Islamiyah (a.k.a. Islamic Martyr's Movement, IMM)	Libya	1996–2007
Harakat Ansar al-Din	Mali	2011–2017
Hizbul al Islam	Somalia	2009–2010
Imarat Kavkaz (IK, or Caucasus Emirate)	Russia (Chechnya)	2007–2019
Indian Mujahedeen	India	2005–present
Islamic Jihad Union (a.k.a. Islamic Jihad Group)	Uzbekistan	2002–2025
Islamic Movement of Uzbekistan (IMU)	Uzbekistan, Kyrgyzstan	1997–2023
Islamic State of Iraq and the Levant (ISIL)	Iraq, Syria	2004–present
Jabhat al-Nusrah	Syria	2011–2017
Jaish ul-Adl	Iran	2013–2026
Jaish al-Islam (a.k.a. Tawhid and Jihad Brigades)	Gaza Strip, Egypt (Sinai Peninsula)	2005–present
Jamaat Ansarullah (JA)	Tajikistan	2010–present
Jamaah Ansharut Tauhid (JAT)	Indonesia	2008–2014
Jemaah Islamiyah (JI)	Indonesia, Malaysia, Philippines, Singapore	1993–2024
Jondullah	Pakistan	2003–2017
Jund al-Sham	Lebanon, Syria, Gaza Strip, Qatar, Afghanistan	1999–2008
Khalifa Islamiyah Mindanao (KIM)	Philippines	2011-2013
Lashkar-e-Taiba (LeT, a.k.a. Mansoorian)	Pakistan (Kashmir)	1990–present
Libyan Islamic Fighting Group (LIFG)	Libya	1990–2017
Moroccan Islamic Combatant Group (GICM)	Morocco, Western Europe	1998–2013
Movement for Tawhid and Jihad in West Africa (MUJAO)	Mali	2011–2013
Mujahideen Shura Council	Gaza Strip, Egypt (Sinai Peninsula)	2012-2013
Salafia Jihadia (As-Sirat al Moustaquim)	Morocco	1995–present
Tawhid wal Jihad	Iraq	1999–2004
Tunisian Combat Group (TCG)	Tunisia, Western Europe	2000–2011
Firqat al-Ghuraba	Syria	2013–present
Ansar Al-Furqan	Iran	2013–present

=== Ruling strategy ===
In several places and times, jihadis have taken control of an area and they have ruled it as an Islamic state, such as ISIL in Syria and Iraq.

Among jihadists, establishing an uncompromising form of sharia law is a core value and goal, but strategies differ over how quickly this should be done. Observers such as the journalist Robert Worth have described jihadis as being torn between wanting to build a truly Islamic order gradually from the bottom up in order to avoid alienating non-jihadi Muslims (the desire of Osama bin Laden), and not wanting to wait for the creation of an Islamic state.

In Zinjibar, Yemen, AQAP established an "emirate" which lasted from May 2011 until the summer of 2012. It emphasized (and publicized with a media campaign) "uncharacteristically gentle" good governance over its conquered territory rather than strict enforcement of sharia law—rebuilding infrastructure, quashing banditry, and resolving legal disputes. One jihadi veteran of Yemen described its approach towards the local population:

You have to take a gradual approach with them when it comes to religious practices. You can't beat people for drinking alcohol when they don't even know the basics of how to pray. We have to first stop the great sins, and then move gradually to the lesser and lesser ones. ... Try to avoid enforcing Islamic punishments as much as possible unless you are forced to do so.

However AQAP's "clemency drained away under the pressure of war", and the area was taken back by the government. The failure of this model (according to New York Times correspondent Robert Worth), may have "taught" jihadis a lesson on the need to instill fear.

ISIS is believed to have used a manifesto which is titled "The Management of Savagery" as its model. The manifesto emphasizes the need to create areas of "savagery"—i.e., lawlessness—in enemy territory. Once the enemy was too exhausted and weakened from the lawlessness (particularly terrorism) to continue to try to govern its territory, the nucleus of a new caliphate could be established in its place. The author of "The Management of Savagery", did not place a lot of emphasis on winning the sympathy of local Muslims, instead, he placed a lot of emphasis on the use of extreme violence, writing that: "One who previously engaged in jihad knows that it is naught but violence, crudeness, terrorism, frightening [others] and massacring – I am talking about jihad and fighting, not about Islam and one should not confuse them." (Social-media posts from ISIS territory "suggest that individual executions happen more or less continually, and mass executions occur every few weeks", according to journalist Graeme Wood.)

== Views on violence ==
In recent years, the Salafi methodology has come to be associated with the jihad of extremist groups that advocate the killing of innocent civilians. The European Parliament, in a report commissioned in 2013, claimed that Wahhabi and Salafi-Jihadi groups are involved, mainly via Saudi charities, in the support and supply of arms to rebel groups around the world. Some Salafi scholars appear to support violent extremism. The Egyptian Salafi-Jihadist cleric Mahmoud Shaaban "appeared on a religious television channel calling for the deaths of main opposition figures Mohammed ElBaradei – a Nobel Peace Prize laureate – and former presidential candidate Hamdeen Sabahi". Some other Islamic groups, particularly amongst Sufis, have also complained about extremism among some Salafi.

According to the British Researcher Anabel Inge:

"While aspects of their purist creed are shared by Jihadi groups, most—probably the vast majority of—Salafis in Europe are explicitly against terrorism. ... In Britain, the 'Salafi' label has been associated with non-violent, often quietist groups. ... One preacher, for instance, encouraged his online followers to 'mass distribute' an anti-ISIS leaflet he had written, in which he urged anyone with information about terrorist plots to 'inform the authorities'. That same preacher reported receiving death threats from ISIS sympathizers. ... I found no evidence of so-called brainwashing. On the contrary, I found that the Salafi conversion process was largely intellectual, rather than based on social or other pressures."

Traditional Salafis have rejected the use of violence by Salafi-Jihadists. The Saudi scholar Muhammad ibn al Uthaymeen considered suicide bombing to be unlawful and the scholar Abdul Muhsin al-Abbad wrote a treatise entitled: According to which intellect and Religion is Suicide bombings and destruction considered Jihad?. Muhammad Nasiruddin al-Albani stated that "History repeats itself. Everybody claims that the Prophet is their role model. Our Prophet spent the first half of his message making dawah, and he did not start it with jihad". The vast majority of Salafis reject violence, viewing most Salafi-Jihadist groups as deviants, and are amongst their most vehement critics. It has been noted that the Western association of Salafism with violence stems from writings "through the prism of security studies" that were published in the late 20th century and that continue to persist.

== Condemnations and challenges by Muslims ==
Many Muslim leaders, scholarly figures and dozens of Islamic councils have denounced Salafi jihadism as deviant. Numerous Islamic scholars, of both Salafi and non-Salafi persuasions, have written treatises in which they have compared certain Salafi Jihadists groups like Islamic State to Kharijites. Some scholars, Western policy institutes, and political scientists have asserted that Salafi-Jihadism can be a gateway to violent extremism and terrorism.

According to Western analysts, obstacles in countering Salafi jihadism are funding from oil-rich Gulf nations and private donations which are difficult to track, Saudi efforts to propagate Salafiyya movement throughout the Muslim world, resentment for Western hegemony, authoritarian Arab regimes, feeling defenseless against foreign aggression and that "Muslim blood is cheap," weak governance, extremist Salafi preaching that counters moderate voices, and other challenges.

Dutch political scientist Alex P. Schmid states:

"Salafist Jihadism (al-Salafiyya al-Jihadiyya) has managed to establish itself as the dominant ideology of rebellion in the early 21st century, just as Fascism and Communism had been the most violent ideologies of the twentieth century. For a brief moment in 2011, the Arab Spring with its non-violent mass demonstrations, seemed to offer an alternative model of rebellion in the absence of democratic regimes but when these mass uprisings were crushed in all countries except Tunisia, jihadism as a non-mass based method of fighting repression and foreign intervention gained the upper hand in the minds of many militant youths."

== See also ==
- Christian terrorism
- Islamic terrorism
- Islamist anti-Hamas groups in the Gaza Strip
- Hindu terrorism
- Hindutva
