= Saudi crackdown on Islamic scholars =

Governmental crackdown against Islamic scholars in Saudi Arabia

- Date: Late 2017 - present
- Location: Saudi Arabia
- Participants: Various prominent Islamic scholars and thinkers within the country
- Outcome: Many scholars have been arrested and jailed, while others have been banned from speaking or writing.

The Saudi crackdown on Islamic scholars refers to a series of actions taken by the Saudi Arabian government against various prominent Islamic scholars and thinkers within the country. The crackdown began in late 2017 and has continued to the present day, with many scholars being arrested and jailed, while others have been banned from speaking or writing.

Saudi Arabia has a long history of controlling and limiting the activities of Islamic scholars, particularly those who promote dissent or challenge the government's authority. In recent years, there have been several high-profile cases of Saudi authorities cracking down on prominent Islamic scholars, often accusing them of supporting extremism or spreading false information.

Since Mohammad bin Salman, son of Saudi King Salman, was crowned in June 2017 dozens of Islamic scholars, imams, volunteers and members of the royal family have been arrested. Saudi authorities arrested dozens of high-profile Islamic scholars, including Sheikh Salman al-Awda, Sheikh Awad al-Qarni, and Sheikh Ali al-Omari. These arrests were part of a wider crackdown on dissent and criticism of the government, and the scholars were accused of a range of charges, including terrorism, incitement, and supporting extremist groups.

In 2018, the Saudi government also arrested and detained several prominent women's rights activists, including several who had spoken out against the country's strict gender segregation laws. These arrests were widely criticized by human rights groups, who accused the government of silencing dissent and cracking down on basic human rights.

Saudi Arabia's government has made some efforts in recent years to loosen restrictions on religious expression, the country continues to tightly control the activities of Islamic scholars and other religious figures.

== Background ==
Saudi Arabia is a predominantly Muslim country, and its government has long claimed to be the custodian of Islam's two holiest sites, Mecca and Medina. The country has traditionally followed a strict interpretation of Sunni Islam known as Wahhabism, which emphasizes adherence to the Quran and the Hadith, the sayings and actions of Muhammad without relying on traditional interpretations and instead opting for a more literal approach.

Under Vision 2030 Saudi Crown Prince Mohammed bin Salman, Saudi Arabia's conservative society has introduced a number of modern reforms on economic, social and religious, including easing laws to allow women to work and drive for the first time and attend public gatherings, as well as freedom of mixed musical concerts and entertainment, and opening cinema halls.

Speaking to Al Jazeera, Yahya Assiri, a human rights activist from Saudi Arabia in the UK, said that the Saudi authorities were monitoring anyone influential and of social importance. He said that not even those who are silent or who do not oppose the government are safe.

== Crackdown ==
In September 2017, the Saudi government arrested a number of prominent scholars and thinkers, including Salman al-Ouda, Awad al-Qarni, and Ali al-Omari. Sheikh Salman al-Awdah is widely recognized as a progressive Islamic scholar, and UN experts have described him as a "reformist." Al-Qarni, on the other hand, is known as a preacher, academic, and author, while al-Omari is a popular broadcaster.

Over the following months, more scholars were arrested and jailed, while others were banned from speaking or writing. The government accused them of promoting terrorism, spreading false information, and inciting public disorder. For example, Mohammed Alhajji, a well-known Saudi academic and influential figure on Snapchat, was taken into the custody of Saudi authorities. Experts have pointed to this incident as indicative of the Saudi government's intensified actions against social media users. Another instance involves Safar al-Hawali, a distinguished scholar who has been held in confinement for over 7 years as of July 2025. His detainment without trial and necessary accommodations for his disability were ruled to be human rights violations by the United Nations in 2024.

In late 2025, several long-detained scholars saw updates to their status amid continued human rights criticism. Sheikh Saleh Al-Talib, arrested in 2018 for a sermon on speaking against wrongdoing, was released from prison on 29 September 2025 after over seven years but placed under house arrest with electronic monitoring. Other scholars like Naif Al-Sahafi and Mohammed Musa Al-Shareef remained in detention, entering their ninth and eighth years respectively, following unfair trials. Safar al-Hawali's ongoing detention was highlighted in media reports for promoting anti-Western ideologies.

== Criticism ==
The crackdown has been widely criticized by human rights groups and scholars around the world. For example, Yahya Ibrahim Assiri, a Saudi dissident residing in the UK and the founder of the human rights group ALQST, told BBC News that the arrests reflect a broader pattern of preemptive targeting of influential figures, even those not actively dissenting, to consolidate power under Crown Prince Mohammed bin Salman.

Jamal Khashoggi, who was a prominent Saudi journalist and dissident, had decried the numerous arrests orchestrated by the crown prince's government in one of his final columns for The Washington Post. He also highlighted the "public shaming of intellectuals and religious leaders who dare to express opinions contrary to those of my country's leadership."

Some scholars have also accused the government of abandoning traditional Islamic values in favor of political expediency, and of using its religious authority to legitimize its policies and suppress dissent. Various voices, including Khaled A. Beydoun, a law professor and author of "American Islamophobia: Understanding the Roots and Rise of Fear," have expressed their perspectives. In an opinion piece for Al Jazeera, Beydoun conveyed that "Saudi Arabia does not represent Islam" and characterized the Saudi state as being governed by a select few who are both desperate and austere.

Madawi Al-Rasheed, a visiting professor at the Middle East Centre at LSE, has also contributed to the discussion, writing about the ongoing challenges facing Saudi Arabia. She describes the nation as grappling with a perpetual struggle between the forces of modernity and the forces of traditionalism.

Human rights organizations continued to condemn the detentions into late 2025, framing conditional releases like that of Sheikh Saleh Al-Talib as extensions of repression rather than genuine freedom. Reports also noted broader crackdowns on dissent, including arrests tied to pro-Gaza solidarity amid the ongoing conflict, though specific cases involving scholars were not detailed.

== Reactions ==
The crackdown has raised serious concerns about freedom of speech and the government's commitment to human rights and the rule of law.

- Prisoners of Conscience, an organization that tweets as معتقلي الرأي is a human rights organization that tracks the arrests in the kingdom. The group, which monitors 'prisoners of conscience' via social media, documented at least eight additional detentions in September 2017, including scholars and academics, as part of the sweep.

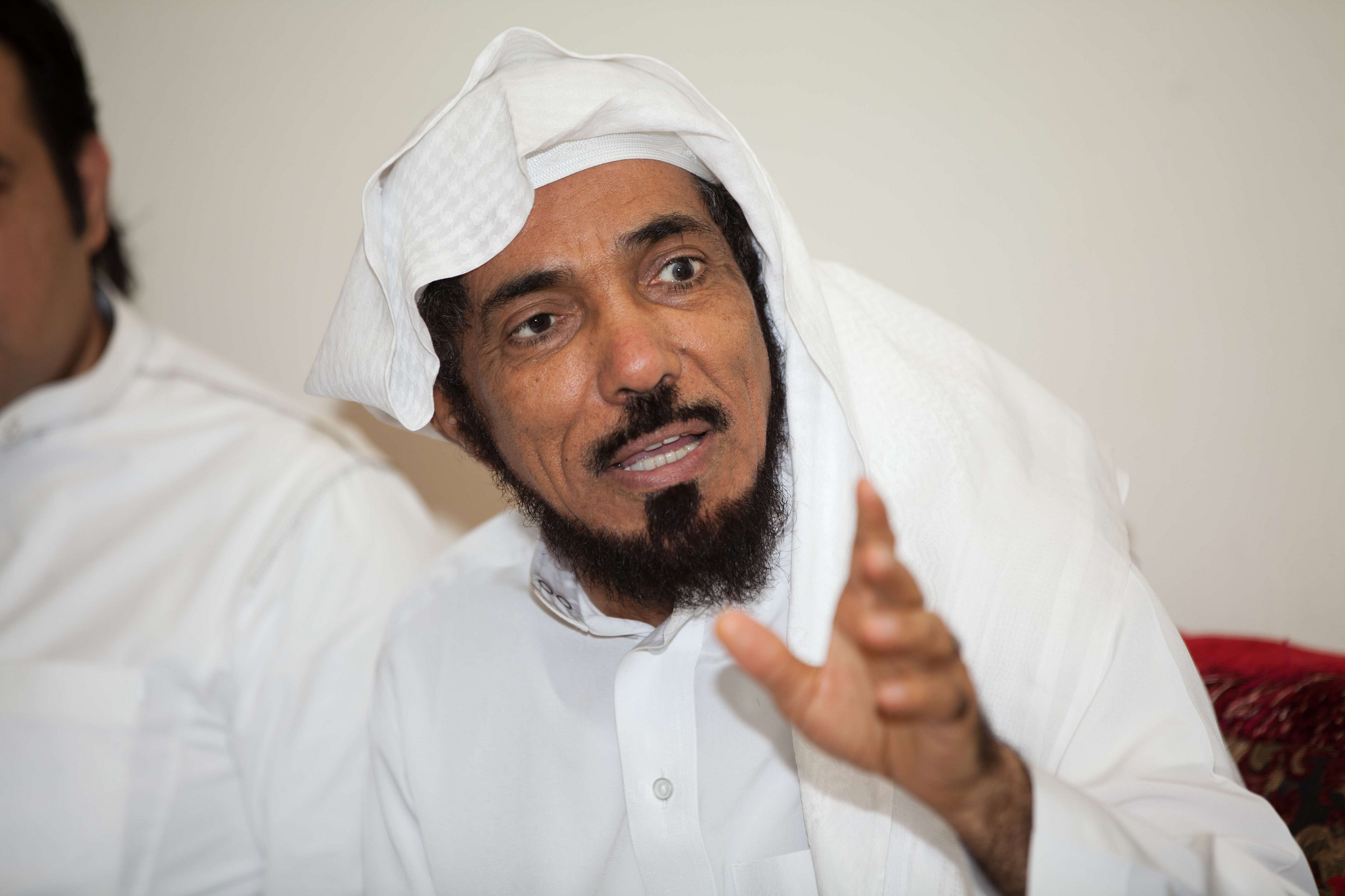
Salman al-Ouda

- Amnesty International has expressed concern over the arrest of Sheikh Salman al-Ouda, who could face the death penalty with two other scholars.
- The arrests of these individuals have also triggered strong condemnation from the United Nations and Human Rights Watch.
- The International Union of Muslim Scholars (IUMS) specifically condemned the 2017 arrests as using scholars as 'pawns in political disputes,' calling for unity in the Gulf amid the Qatar crisis and urging King Salman to intervene. Amnesty International highlighted risks of unfair trials and potential death penalties, while HRW described the sweep as part of an 'ongoing repression campaign' against dissidents

== Arrests ==
Prominent arrests
Arrested	Status	Accusation	Ref(s)
Ibrahim al-Sakran	Released with restrictions	Undermining national security and destabilizing social stability (2016 charges); continued detention post-sentence	
Salman al-Ouda	Detained/Facing death penalty	Terrorism-related charges, including inciting disorder and contacts with the Muslim Brotherhood; arrested in September 2017 amid anti-corruption sweep	
Saleh Al-Talib	Released under house arrest	Criticized mixed public gatherings and sermon calling for speaking against wrongdoing; arrested August 2018 after sermon at Grand Mosque	
Ahmed al-Amari	Died/killed in custody		
Omar Al-Muqbil	Detained	criticised the policies of the General Entertainment Authority (GEA)	
Naif Al-Sahafi	Detained	Part of the 2017 crackdown on scholars and activists; arrested September 2017, secret trial without legal representation	
Safar al-Hawali	Detained	published a book that included criticism of the ruling Saudi royal family over their ties to Israel.	
Abdulaziz al-Tarefe	Detained	Calling the Saudi government an apostate.	
Fahd Al-Qadi	Died in prison	for writing advice letter to Saudi king	
Abd Al-Aziz Fawzan Al-Fawzan	Detained	criticized the arrests of other clerics	
Musa Al-Ghanami	Detained	uncertain	
Mohammed Musa Al-Shareef	Detained	Arrested during the 2017 wave targeting scholars; endured enforced disappearance, denial of family contact, and unfair trial	
Sulaiman Al-Alwan	Detained	criticized the Saudi government and pro-government scholars, allegedly supported Al Qaeda members	
Ali al-Khudair	Detained	Issued fatwa declaring killing Saudi security personnel during confrontations halal, called on Saudis to not cooperate with security forces hunting the suspects of the al-Muhaya bombings	
Nasir al-Fahd	Detained	Issued fatwa declaring killing Saudi security personnel during confrontations halal, called on Saudis to not cooperate with security forces hunting the suspects of the al-Muhaya bombings	
Ahmad al-Khalidi	Detained	Issued fatwa declaring killing Saudi security personnel during confrontations halal, called on Saudis to not cooperate with security forces hunting the suspects of the al-Muhaya bombings	
Awad al-Qarni	Detained/Facing death penalty	Terrorism charges, including spreading false information and supporting extremism; part of 2017 arrests of over 20 clerics	
Ali al-Omari	Detained/Facing death penalty	Accused of terrorism and inciting disorder; broadcaster arrested in 2017 with other prominent figures	
Mohammed Alhajji	Detained	Social media influence seen as promoting dissent; arrested in 2023 despite no political activity, highlighting crackdown on non-political voices	
