= National Assembly Party =

National Assembly Party حزب التجمع الوطني
- Secretary-General: Yahya Assiri
- Spokesperson: Madawi al-Rasheed
- Founded: 23 September 2020; 5 years ago
- Headquarters: London, UK
- Ideology: Parliamentary democracy Anti-House of Saud
- Political position: Catch-all

Website
- the-naas.com

The National Assembly Party (Arabic: حزب التجمع الوطني) or NAAS (Arabic: ناس; lit. 'people') is an opposition party of Saudi Arabia with members (mostly) in exile.

Founded in September 2020 on Saudi National Day, it is the first organized political resistance founded during the rule of King Salman, during which, as of December 2025, political parties remained banned.

== Platform ==
NAAS is described as a pro-democracy group.

The group maintains that the country should be governed with the idea of separation of powers, calling for creation of an elected parliament and an independent judiciary based on a constitution approved by the people. According to the Middle East Eye, the group has not elaborated on its position on the fate of the current monarchy and the House of Saud in their proposed system. The NAAS spokesperson wrote an opinion on the publication titled "a vision for a democratic Saudi Arabia free from the house of Saud".

The party criticizes Saudi Arabia's foreign policy towards countries in the region, terming it as "aggressive".

== History ==
The idea of the opposition party was established through failed experiments or practices that preceded it (Islamist or Leftist), whether they were calling for political participation or separatism.

== Membership ==
Yahya Assiri is the party's general-secretary and Madawi al-Rasheed serves as the spokesperson. In addition to the two, the party's inaugural statement was signed by Ahmed Almshikhs, Saeed al-Ghamdi, Abdullah Al-Ouda (son of Salman al-Ouda) and Omar Al-Zahrani on behalf of the founders. Omar Abdulaziz is also a member.

== See also ==
- List of political parties in Saudi Arabia
- Committee for the Defense of Legitimate Rights, Saudi group created in 1993 that openly opposed the monarchy, based in Saudi Arabia
