= Sa'ad Al-Faqih =

Saudi surgeon and dissident in exile (born 1957)

Saad Rashed Mohammad al-Faqih (Arabic: سعد راشد محمد الفقيه ALA-LC: Saʻd Rāshid Muḥammad al-Faqīh; born February 2, 1957), also known as Saad Al-Fagih, is a Muslim Saudi national and former surgeon who heads the Movement for Islamic Reform in Arabia (MIRA) and lives in London. He was a key player in preparing the "Letter of Demands" of 1991 and the "Memorandum of Advice" the following year. Both documents were endorsed by a considerable number of prominent figures, including Sheikh Bin Baz, Al-Uthaymeen and Salman Al-Ouda, and were then presented to the king at the time, Fahd. In 1994, the Committee for the Defense of Legitimate Rights (CDLR), the then leading Saudi opposition group, which opposed the Saudi government as un-Islamic, was established; Al-Faqih was appointed as the head of CDLR's London office, with another Saudi dissident, Mohammad al-Massari as the spokesperson. The two separated, and al-Faqih went on to set up MIRA in 1996.

Al-Faqih's organisation opposes the current sociopolitical and religious policy of Saudi Arabia. Although he campaigns for religious reform, he prefers not to be referred to as a Wahabbist. He maintains that Islam advocates separation of powers, freedom of expression, transparency and women's rights, in contrast to what he maintains is the current Saudi policy. He is also an anti-royalist, asserting that the Saudi government has lost its religious legitimacy.

== Early life ==
Saad al-Faqih was born in Az Zubayr, southern Iraq, to a Najdi family. He was professor of surgery at King Saud University in Riyadh, Saudi Arabia, until March 1994. He was jailed for his involvement in the country's reform movement. On his release from prison, he became director of the London office of the CDLR. He left CDLR to found MIRA in 1996.

== Terrorism support allegations ==
In December 2004, the United States Department of the Treasury accused al-Faqih of being affiliated with Al Qaeda, alleging that he had maintained relations with the group since 1998. Two days later, the names of al-Faqih and MIRA were added to the UN 1267 Committee's list of individuals and entities belonging to or associated with al-Qaeda. The Treasury statement mentions al-Faqih's past affiliation with Osama bin Laden, Khalid al-Fawwaz, Mustafa Setmariam Nasar, and an obscure al-Qaeda ideologue who writes, or used to write, under the name Lewis Attiyatullah. Al-Faqih has asserted that authorities, such as the United States government, wish to vilify him because they are allies with the current Saudi regime, which he opposes and denies all allegations.

BBC Radio 5 Live reported a claim that in 1996, al-Faqih purchased an Exact-M 22 satellite phone for Osama bin Laden, an allegation which has not even been investigated, nor has he been charged by any court in the world. Al-Faqih confirms that he and MIRA are "totally committed to peaceful agenda.".

He has since been removed from the UN sanctions list after the UN Security Council committee accepted the Ombudsman's recommendation to have him removed. The committee's chairman, German Permanent Representative Peter Wittig, announced in a statement on 3 July 2012 that "after thorough consideration", Dr Al-Faqih and Mira had been removed. "The key question the committee has to consider is whether there is sufficient information to provide a reasonable and credible basis for concluding that an individual, group, undertaking, or entity is associated with al-Qaeda," he added. The UK and Germany reportedly supported Dr Faqih's removal, while the US and Saudi Arabia were among those who opposed it. Dr Al-Faqih said it had been a "laborious battle" to get off the sanctions list. "All that has happened in the last eight years is that an innocent, peaceful activist, acting within the law, has been a victim of a conspiracy by tyrants in the Gulf supported by superpowers," he told the Reuters news agency.
