= Fahd Al-Qadi =

Saudi Arabian Islamic scholar (c.1957–2019)

- Born: c. 1957; Riyadh, Saudi Arabia
- Died: 12 November 2019; Saudi Arabia
- Education: Imam Muhammad ibn Saud University
- Occupations: Islamic scholar, judge, academic
- Movement: Sahwa movement

Sheikh Fahd Al-Qadi (الشيخ فهد القاضي) (c. 1957 - 12 November 2019) was a Saudi Arabian Islamic scholar, judge and academic who died in the prison due to acute pneumonia. He was associated with the Sahwa movement and Committee for the Promotion of Virtue and the Prevention of Vice (Saudi Arabia) Alumnus of Imam Muhammad ibn Saud University.

In 2013, he had objected to a decision by the Saudi Minister of Education to allow female students to attend horse races.

== Early life and education ==
Sheikh Al-Zahid Al-Abed Al-Muhtasib Abi Abdullah Fahd bin Suleiman bin Muhammad Al-Qadi was born in 1377 H in Riyadh. After graduating from high school he studied one semester in Islamic University of Madinah and then graduated from Imam Muhammad ibn Saud University.

== Arrest ==
He was in custody since September 2016 after sending a letter of secret advice to the royal court. In October 2019, he was sentenced to six years in prison. He was arrested along with Abdulaziz al-Tarefe, Ibrahim al-Sakran and Mohammed Al-Hudaif.

== Death ==
Al-Qadi died on 12 November in Saudi prison of pneumonia. His family blamed authorities for his death as a result of medical negligence. He was laid to rest on 13 November 2019 and a large number of people attended his funeral prayers at Al-Rajhi Mosque in Riyadh.
