= Abdullah Al-Ouda =

Saudi academic

- Education: Qassim University; University of Pittsburgh (LLM, SJD)
- Occupations: Legal scholar, director of research for the Gulf Region at Democracy for the Arab World Now, co-founder of the Saudi National Assembly Party
- Known for: Advocacy for political reform and human rights in Saudi Arabia, raising voice for father Salman Al-Ouda
- Parent: Salman Al-Ouda (father)

Abdullah Al-Ouda (Arabic: عبد الله العودة) is a legal scholar from Saudi Arabia. He currently holds the position of director of research for the Gulf Region at Democracy for the Arab World Now and is one of the co-founders of the Saudi National Assembly Party. Alaoudh has been actively involved in advocating for democracy and human rights in Saudi Arabia as a signatory to the Saudi People's Vision for Reform, which outlines a blueprint for these principles in the country.

== Family background ==
Abdullah Al-Ouda was born to Salman Al-Ouda who belonged to the Al-Ouda branch of the aristocratic Bani Khalid. The Bani Khalid had an established Emirate in the Eastern region of the Arabian Peninsula, with control from the town of Kuwait to the Najd during the 17th and 18th centuries before their fall to the Al-Saud Dynasty from the Bani Hanifa.

== Education ==
Abdullah Al-Ouda pursued his LL.M. and S.J.D. degrees from the University of Pittsburgh School of Law. His doctoral research focused on the role of religious institutions in post-revolutionary Arab countries and their significance in the transition to democracy. Prior to this, he completed his bachelor's degree in Islamic law from Qassim University.

== Career ==
In his academic career, Al-Ouda has held various prestigious positions. He was a Sponsored University Associate and Former Senior Fellow at the Alwaleed Center for Muslim-Christian Understanding, located within the Edmund A. Walsh School of Foreign Service at Georgetown University. Additionally, he served as a fellow at the Yaqeen Institute. During 2017–2018, he was a Research Scholar in Law and an Islamic Law & Civilization Research Fellow at Yale Law School.

== Personal life ==
Abdullah Al-Ouda is the son of Salman Al-Ouda, a scholar of Islamic law in Saudi Arabia known for his reformist views.

== Advocacy for his father ==
His father has been in solitary confinement since his arrest on 10 September 2017. The reason for his arrest was an expression of his desire for reconciliation between Saudi Arabia and Qatar, which he conveyed through a tweet. Following his arrest, Saudi authorities held him without any formal charges for a year. However, Attorney General Saud Al Mojeb of Saudi Arabia is seeking the death penalty for Salman Al-Ouda based on 37 charges.

Abdullah Al-Ouda has contributed articles to various international publications, including The Guardian, where he advocates for international pressure to halt his father's execution, as he views it as an act of "state-sanctioned murder." Additionally, he has publicly voiced concerns about the mistreatment his father endured while in detention and has been a vocal advocate for his father's release.
