= Movement for Islamic Reform in Arabia =

The Movement for Islamic Reform in Arabia (MIRA, Arabic: الحركة الإسلامية للإصلاح) was a British-based Saudi oppositionist organization headed by Sa'ad Al-Faqih, who has been a key figure in the reform movement in Saudi Arabia since the Persian Gulf War. According to al-Faqih, "[the] MIRA office in London is the information and media centre of the movement rather than the leadership." MIRA was established in London in April 1996, and its aim, along with that of the Committee for the Defense of Legitimate Rights (CDLR), which seemed to be a front for Hizb ut-Tahrir and Mohammad al-Massari, is to change the ruling system from a monarchy to an Islamic one using political means.

According to a 2005 United States Department of State report on human rights in Saudi Arabia, MIRA was founded in 1996 as a splinter of the Committee for the Defense of Legitimate Rights, both of which "continued to advocate overthrowing the (Saudi) monarchy by force." The report adds: "In December 2004 police arrested 21 persons for taking part in Jeddah in an anti-government protest sponsored by MIRA, whose leader, Sa'ad al-Faqih, was a supporter of international terrorism."

== See also ==
- List of political parties in Saudi Arabia
- Al-Haraka al-Islahiya al-Islamiya
