= Muhammad al-'Arifi =

Saudi Arabian author and Da'i

Muhammad al-Arifi
- محمد العريفي
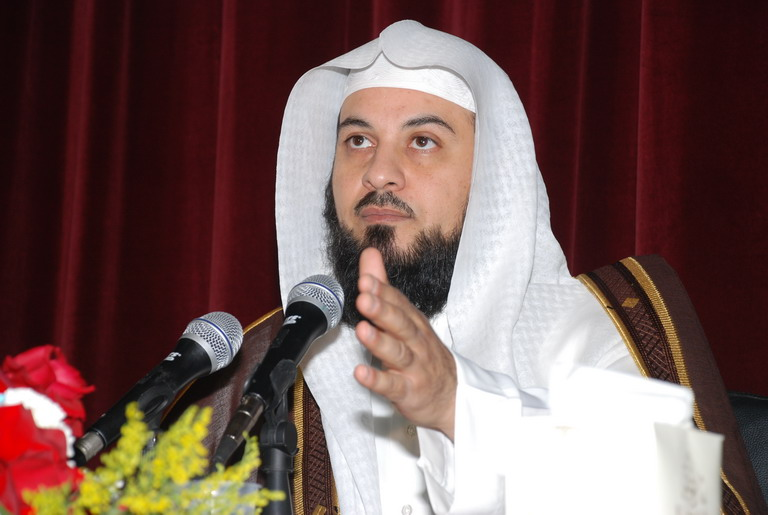
- Born: 15 July 1970 (age 56); Riyadh, Saudi Arabia
- Occupation: scholar
- Years active: 1990-2019
- Website: arefe.ws

Muhammad bin Abdul-Rahman al-Arifi (Arabic: محمد بن عبد الرحمن العريفي; born 15 July 1970) is a Saudi Arabian author and Da'i. He is a graduate of King Saud University and member of the Muslim World League and the Association of Muslim Scholars.

== Events ==
In 2013, Muslim Brotherhood affiliation was denied by Al-Arifi and Adil al-Kalbani, saying that they are affiliated with the Union of Muslim Scholars.

In 2014, He said that jihad in Syria is incumbent and did apologia for al-Nusra while visiting the Imam Muhammad ibn Abd al-Wahhab Mosque in Qatar.

As of 2016, Al-Arifi had over 20 million followers on Twitter.

In 2016, Al-Arifi had a discussion with Saudi Deputy crown prince Mohammad bin Salman Al Saud (MBS) and then tweeted and posted a photo of them smiling together. The discussion was held on the same day as Saudi Vision 2030 began. He asked God to bless MBS and posted his thanks. Al-Arifi met with Mohammed bin Salman again and talked with him and posted the photo of them smiling together on Twitter. They talked about the future of the Islamic world and of the Kingdom (of Saudi Arabia). King Saud University employs Al-Arifi.

Al-Arifi's Twitter account was suspended in 2018.

In February 2021, it was reported that Al-Arifi was under watch by Saudi government authorities and that his moves and actions were being followed using spy devices and a tracking knee band.

== Sanctions ==
In May 2013, Al-Arifi was banned from entering Switzerland for a period of 5 years, for holding extreme views, Switzerland said.

In March 2014, he was banned by the Home Office from returning to Britain after a series of sermons in Cardiff, Birmingham and London. A Home Office spokesperson said: "We can confirm “Al-Arefe” has been excluded from the United Kingdom, The Government makes no apologies for refusing people access to the UK if we believe they represent a threat to our society. Coming here is a privilege that we refuse to extend to those who seek to subvert our shared values."

Denmark banned him from entering the country for two years in May 2017.

== See also ==
- Islam in Saudi Arabia
- Yusuf al-Qaradawi
- Salman al-Ouda
- Aid al-Qarni
- Mohammed Rateb al-Nabulsi
- Tareq Al-Suwaidan
- Omar Abd al-Kafi
