= Omar Al-Muqbil =

Islamic scholar

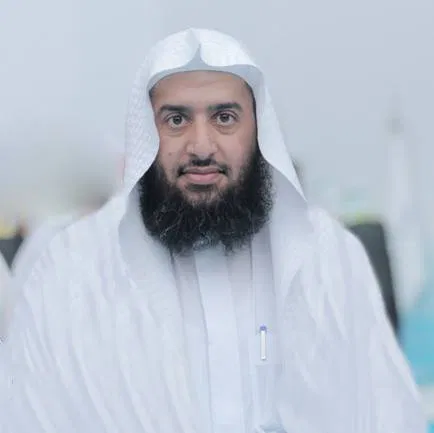
- Al-Muqbil in 2021
- Born: Omar bin Abdullah bin Muhammad bin Saleh; 1972 (age 53–54); Al Mithnab, Saudi Arabia
- Education: Imam Muhammad ibn Saud Islamic University, Qassim University
- Occupations: Islamic scholar, writer, researcher, preacher, professor of Islamic law
- Notable work: "The spread of weak hadiths in contemporary means of communication, causes, manifestations, treatment, an applied study on mobile and the Internet", "The hadiths mentioned in the name of Muhsin", "The stagnation on the apparent meaning of the Prophetic hadith: A critical study"

Omar Al-Muqbil (Arabic: عمر المقبل, born Omar bin Abdullah bin Muhammad bin Saleh; 1972) is a Saudi Islamic scholar, writer, researcher, preacher and professor of Islamic law at Qassim University. He is an alumnus of Imam Muhammad ibn Saud Islamic University and Qassim University. He studied under the Muhammad ibn al Uthaymeen, Abd al-Aziz ibn Baz and Yahya Bin Abdul Aziz Al-Yahya.

== Arrest ==
In September 2019, he was detained after a video circulated in which he criticized the General Entertainment Authority (GEA), saying the body was “erasing the original identity of society”. As of as of February 2025, he remained in detention, despite reports that his sentence had concluded in March 2024.

== Works ==
Al-Muqbil has authored a number of books and publications, including:

- Al Muqbil, Omar. انتشار الأحاديث الضعيفة في وسائل الاتصال المعاصرة، الأسباب، المظاهر، العلاج، دراسة تطبيقية على الجوال والإنترنت [The spread of weak hadiths in contemporary means of communication, causes, manifestations, treatment, an applied study on mobile and the Internet] (in Arabic).
- Al-Muqbil, Omar. الأحاديث الواردة في اسم المحسن [The hadiths mentioned in the name of Muhsin] (in Arabic).
- Al-Muqbil, Omar. الجمود على ظاهر لفظ الحديث النبوي: دراسة نقدية [The stagnation on the apparent meaning of the Prophetic hadith: A critical study] (in Arabic). College of Sharia - Qassim University.
