= Committee for the Defense of Legitimate Rights =

Saudi dissident group created in 1993

- لجنة الدفاع عن الحقوق الشرعية
- Formation: May 3, 1993
- Founder: Six prominent Islamist scholars and academics
- Type: Saudi dissident group
- Purpose: Opposing the Saudi government as un-Islamic
- Headquarters: Riyadh, Saudi Arabia (originally)
- Location: London, United Kingdom (later)
- Key people: Mohammad al-Massari (official spokesman), Sa'ad Al-Faqih

The Committee for the Defense of Legitimate Rights (CDLR; Arabic: لجنة الدفاع عن الحقوق الشرعية) was a British-based Saudi dissident group created in 1993 which opposed the Saudi government as un-Islamic.

The CDLR was the first opposition organization in the Kingdom openly challenging the monarchy, accusing the government and senior ulama of not doing enough to protect the legitimate Islamic rights of the Muslims.

== History ==
Founded in Riyadh on May 3, 1993, by six prominent Islamist scholars and academics, the CDLR served to "pass on the views of the Islamist opposition that were rapidly developing in the universities and mosques" of Saudi Arabia. In its Arabic-language pronouncements, the CDLR maintained a strict "Islamist line," claiming to defend "the rules laid out in the sharia," while its English-language statements denounced violations of human rights in Saudi Arabia.

Using the new media such as faxes and Internet efficiently, the CDLR members from the Kingdom and later from exile in London, challenged the foundation of the Saudi regime, that is, the contract between Saudi rulers and the religious establishment, and criticized the behavior and decisions of the Saudi authorities, and King Fahd in particular.

Following an interview by the BBC of Mohammad al-Massari, its official spokesman, the CDLR's "signatories and their sympathizers promptly lost their jobs and were thrown into jail." The organization was banned, and its members either left Saudi Arabia or went underground. The CDLR was described as "banned and defunct" by the Saudi Civil and Political Rights Association when the latter was created in October 2009.

Following a campaign by Amnesty International, al-Masari was released from prison, and along with Sa'ad Al-Faqih reestablished the CDLR in London, United Kingdom in April 1994. The group made "feverish use" of fax machines and later an Internet website to criticize the ruling family and deliver its message to Saudi Arabia. Their campaign was effective enough that the Saudi royal family threatened the British government with an end to "lucrative defence contracts and other commercial deals" if "Mr Masari was not silenced," and a court battle ensued over Whitehall's attempt to do just that. "In the end, Mr Masari won a legal battle ... but soon after that he faded from public prominence."

In 1996, Faqih broke with al-Masari who was then a member of Hizb ut-Tahrir, "arguing that the Saudi opposition should operate only within the strict boundaries of UK law," and created the rival Movement for Islamic Reform in Arabia (MIRA).

=== Response from the Kingdom ===
The Saudi government strongly responded to the activities of the CDLR. In September 1994, two leaders of the CDLR, Salman al-Ouda and Safar al-Hawali were arrested together with a large number of their followers in the city of Burayda, Qasim region. Moreover, Sheikh Abd al-Aziz Ibn Baz issued a fatwa, stating that unless these two leading figures repented their former conduct, they would be banned from lecturing, meetings and cassette-recording.

== Criticism ==
Scholar Gilles Kepel has described CDLR and Al-Masari as "failing to raise any groundswell of support" within Saudi Arabia and "sadly lacking" in Islamic "doctrinal ... ballast", as became evident after "he was confronted by a barrage of fatwas issued by the regime's ulema supporters." Al-Masari is also criticised for being two-faced, presenting himself as a fighter of human rights abuses and corruption to English language audiences, while regaling Arabic speakers with attacks on Saudi for its lack of shari'a law enforcement and even pronouncing "takfir against all Muslims who obeyed the laws of Riyadh". In particular, his takfir "destroyed much of his support among [Saudi] dissidents."

In 2004, the CDLR was criticised by the U.S. government for expressing its "understanding" of the "bombings of U.S. military facilities in 1995 and 1996 and sympathy for the perpetrators." Its splinter group, the Islamic Reform Movement, has also been denounced as having "implicitly condoned the two terrorist attacks as well, arguing that they were a natural outgrowth of a political system that does not tolerate peaceful dissent."

In the US State Department's 2005 report, the CDLR is described as an extremist organization which seeks the overthrow of the Saudi monarchy by force.

== Reading List ==
- Teitelbaum, Joshua (2000). Holier Than Thou: Saudi Arabia's Islamic Opposition (Man and Poet Series). Brookings Institution, U.S. ISBN 0-944029-35-3.
