= Muhammad Surur =

Syrian Muslim Brotherhood member (1938–2016)

Personal life
- Born: 1938 Hawran, Syria
- Died: 2016 (aged 77–78) Doha, Qatar

Religious life
- Religion: Islam
- Denomination: Sunni
- Movement: Sururism

Muslim leader
- Influenced by: Ibn Taymiyya, Ibn al-Qayyim, Al-Shawkani, Muhammad Ibn Abd al-Wahhab, Muhammad Rashid Rida, Muhammad ibn Ibrahim Al al-Sheikh, Hassan al-Banna, Sayyid Qutb, Muhammad Qutb
- Influenced: Salman al-Awda, Usama bin Laden, Abu Muhammad al-Maqdisi, Abu Musab al-Zarqawi, Abdul-Razzaq al-Mahdi

Muhammad Surur bin Nayif Zayn al-'Abidin (Arabic: محمد سرور بن نايف زين العابدين; 1938 – 11 November 2016) was a former member of the Syrian Muslim Brotherhood. He is credited with establishing the Salafi Islamist movement known as Sururism (or Sururi), which combines "the organisational methods and political worldview of the Muslim Brotherhood with the theological puritanism of Wahhabism". This movement is noted for advancing a politicized version of Wahhabism in Saudi Arabia. Surur called for non-violent criticism of Muslim rulers but opposed efforts to overthrow regimes in Muslim countries, viewing such actions as fitna (civil strife and chaos). In 1984, he authored the widely read anti-Shia book Wa Ja'a Dawr al-Majus (Arabic: وجاء دور المجوس, lit. 'The Era of the Magians Has Come'). This book posits the Iranian Revolution as a strategy for Shiite domination of the Middle East. His writings influenced Abu Musab al-Zarqawi, the leader of Al-Qaeda in Iraq.

== Life ==
He was born in the Hawran region. In the mid-1960s, while still affiliated with the Syrian Muslim Brotherhood, Surur began to express criticism of the group, such as its acceptance of members from the Sufi Brotherhood. These disagreements led to his relocation to Saudi Arabia in 1965. After being expelled from Saudi Arabia in 1974 on charges of subversive activity he moved to Kuwait. There, he established the Dar al-Arqam publishing house. In 1984, Surur settled in the United Kingdom, where he established the Center for Islamic Studies. In 2004, he relocated to Jordan and then to Qatar where he resided until his death.

== Influence ==
Surur admired Muhammad ibn Ibrahim Al al-Sheikh and was himself initially admired by Abu Muhammad al-Maqdisi—who later considered him to be too lenient towards the Muslim rulers. Surur has also influenced Salman al-Ouda.

After the death of Muhammad Surur in Doha, Abdul-Razzaq al-Mahdi sent condolences and commented on his influence.

== Works ==
- Wa Ja'a Dawr al-Majus (The Era of the Magians Has Come)
- al-Salafiyya Bayna al-Wula wa al-Ghula (Salafism between the Rulers and the Extremists)

== See also ==
- Sahwa movement
