= Aidh al-Qarni =

Activist, author, scholar

Aaidh ibn Abdullah al-Qarni
- عائض بن عبد الله القرني
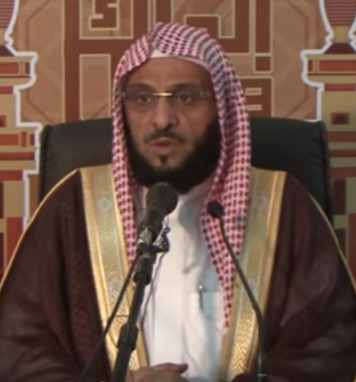

Personal life
- Born: January 1, 1959 (age 67) Saudi Arabia
- Education: Imam Muhammad ibn Saud Islamic University

Religious life
- Religion: Islam
- Movement: Wahhabism

Dr. Aaidh ibn Abdullah al-Qarni (Arabic: عائض بن عبد الله القرني, also spelt al-Qarnee and ʻĀʼiḍ Quranī, born 1 January 1959), is a Saudi Muslim scholar, author, and activist.

Al-Qarni is best known for his self-help book La Tahzan (Don't Be Sad), which is aimed at Muslims and non-Muslims alike.

Al-Quarni is on the United States No Fly List and was barred entry in 2012 and 2015 to attend a convention in Chicago.

Condolences over the death of the son of Salman al-Ouda and his wife were given on Twitter by Aid al-Qarni.

== Books & Poetry Collections ==
- أسعد امرأة في العالم (You Can Be the Happiest Woman in the World (A Treasure Chest Of Reminders))
- "La Tahzan (Don't Be Sad)"
- Taj Al Mada'ih (Poetry of Al Qarni)
- L Alah Al Allh
- Mamlakat Al Bayan
- Masareh Al Ushaq
- Mojtama Al Muthol
- Muhamad Kanak tara
- سلعة الله غالية
- Qisat Al Tamooh
- Siyat Al Qoloob
- Taj Al Madaeh
- Tohaf Nabawiya
- Torjuman Al Sunnah
- على مائدة القرآن
- Wa Jaat Sakarat Al Mawet
- Walaken Konoo Rabaniyin

== Assassination attempt ==
On 1 March 2016, Al-Qarni was shot and wounded in an assassination attempt in Zamboanga City in the Philippines, where he held a lecture at an auditorium of the Western Mindanao State University. He was shot by a man wearing a school uniform of the institution's engineering college as the cleric left the auditorium after the lecture.

The gunman was shot dead and authorities recovered a student's driver license and a local government I.D. identifying a man as a local 21-year old Filipino. The police are not ruling out possibilities that these recovered items were forged and the university couldn't confirm immediately if the man is an enrolled student of the institution.

J.M. Berger of the Program on Extremism at George Washington University suspects that the attempted assassination has links to the militant group, Islamic State since Al-Qarni was listed as a target for assassination in the group's magazine Dabiq. It was later confirmed the gunman was a Sunni Muslim.

== See also ==
- Islam in Saudi Arabia
- Mohamad al-Arefe
- Saleh Al Maghamsi
- Salman al-Ouda
- Qur'an miracles
