= Mohammad al-Massari =

Exiled Saudi physicist and dissident (born 1946)

Mohamed al-Mas'ari محمد المسعري

Personal details
- Born: 8 November 1946 Mecca, Saudi Arabia
- Occupation: Activist
- Known for: Islamist dissident

Military service
- Allegiance: Tajdeed Party

Mohammad al-Mass'ari (Arabic: محمد المسعري, born 8 November 1946, Mecca) is a Britain-based Saudi physicist and political dissident who gained asylum in the United Kingdom in 1994. He runs the Committee for the Defense of Legitimate Rights (CDLR) and is an adviser to the London-based non-profit Islamic Human Rights Commission. In the mid-2000s, he was employed as a lecturer by the physics department of King's College London.

Mohammad al-Massari successfully fought deportation from the United Kingdom in 1996.

== History ==
Al-Massari was born in Mecca to a Saudi father and Egyptian mother. In the early 60s, he went to study in Germany on a state scholarship and received a PhD in theoretical and mathematical physics from the University of Cologne in 1976. He subsequently became a professor at King Saud University. He fled Saudi Arabia in 1993 and gained asylum in the UK.

During the trial of individuals charged with roles in the bombing of the American embassy in Nairobi, evidence was made public that an Exact-M 22 satellite phone purchased by another Saudi dissident Saad Al Faqih, and given to Mohammad al-Massari in 1996, to aid in his deportation battle, received a call from one of the Nairobi suicide bombers eight days before the attack. The phone was also reported to have been used to make calls to arrange an interview of Usama bin Laden by ABC News World News Tonight.

There are reports that attribute to Mohammad al-Massari the assertion that Iraq's leader Saddam Hussein contacted Afghan Arabs in late 2001, following the American invasion, inviting them to find refuge in Iraq. In its report on this assertion, the Middle East Online noted that other experts disputed the claim.

He has been known to declare British troops in Iraq to be legitimate targets for militants, and has hosted videos of bomb attacks and beheadings on his website. He runs a radio station with similar messages, including songs calling for a jihad against coalition forces. Although some government officials have expressed concern over the content of his broadcasts, al-Massari insists that his radio station is not broadcast in Britain and therefore is not under the jurisdiction of the British government.

In March 2003, he made an extended appearance on the BBC series of the television discussion programme After Dark alongside, among others, Albie Sachs, Jim Swire and David Shayler.

In 2004, it was revealed that a corrupt British policeman had used a police computer to research the registration number of the car belonging to al-Massari. The policeman passed on information to a Saudi Arabian intelligence officer. Mohammad al-Massari then had to go into a witness protection program for his own safety.

Al-Massari and his Tajdeed website was mentioned several times in a 2006 analysis of the use of graphics in Islamist terrorist propaganda. The Tajdeed website was taken down in July 2007, possibly in response to publicity generated by a MEMRI report about that site and others like it.

He is the former head of CDLR and is a former member of Hizb ut-Tahrir. He is currently the head of the Party for Islamic Renewal.
