= Safar al-Hawali =

Saudi Arabian scholar (born 1950)

- سفر بن عبدالرحمن الحوالي الغامدي

Personal life
- Born: 1950 (age 75–76) Al Bahah, Saudi Arabia
- Website: www.alhawali.com

Religious life
- Religion: Islam
- Movement: Sahwa

Safar bin Abd al-Rahman al-Hawali al-Ghamdi (Arabic: سفر بن عبدالرحمن الحوالي الغامدي) (born 1950) is a scholar who lives in Mecca. He came to prominence in 1991, as a leader of the Sahwah movement which opposed the presence of US troops on the Arabian Peninsula. In 1993, al-Hawali and Salman al-Ouda were leaders in creating the Committee for the Defense of Legitimate Rights, a group that opposed the Saudi government, for which both were imprisoned from 1994 to 1999.

In July 2018, he was detained by the Saudi authorities, along with his four sons and brother, for writing a 3,000-page book titled Muslims and Western Civilisation. The book is said to include "attacks on Crown Prince Mohammed bin Salman (MBS) and the ruling Saudi royal family over their ties to Israel". As of 2026, al-Hawali remained in detention, with reports of deteriorating health including speech impediments from strokes and renal failure. International human rights organizations and the United Nations have condemned his prolonged solitary confinement and called for his release.

== Biography ==
Safar al-Hawali al-Ghamdi received his doctorate in Islamic theology from Umm al-Qura University, Mecca in 1986. During the 1990s, he was arrested for a period of time by the Saudi authorities for his criticism of the government when he distributed sermons on cassette tapes to incite militants to overthrow the government. Along with another thinker Salman al-Ouda, al-Hawali is said to have led the Sahwa movement (Awakening movement) in Saudi Arabia, a form of Qutbism.

Safar al-Hawali was one of the leaders of The Committee for the Defense of Legitimate Rights (CDLR) that was a Saudi dissident group created in 1993 and was the first ever opposition organization in the Kingdom openly challenging the monarchy, accusing the government and senior ulama of not doing enough to protect the legitimate Islamic rights of the Muslims.

In September 1994, two leaders of the Committee, Salman al-Ouda and Safar al-Hawali were arrested together with a large number of their followers in the city of Burayda, Qasim region. Moreover, Sheikh Abd al-Aziz Ibn Baz issued a fatwa, that unless al-Ouda and al-Hawali repented their former conduct, they would be banned from lecturing, meetings and cassette-recording. In 1999, he and two other scholars were arrested, but were then released without any charge. Hawali has since parted ways with Salman al-Ouda.

=== 2018 arrest and detention ===
In July 2018, Saudi authorities arrested al-Hawali, along with his brother Saadallah and sons Abdulrahman, Abdulrahim, Abdullah, and Abdulmajeed, following the publication of his book Muslims and Western Civilisation, which criticized Saudi foreign policy and ties to Israel. The arrests were part of a broader crackdown on clerics and activists. Al-Hawali's brother and sons were reportedly sentenced to additional years by the Specialized Criminal Court in 2023.

Human rights organizations reported that al-Hawali, in his seventies, suffered from health issues including speech impediments from previous strokes and renal failure requiring medical attention, exacerbated by prolonged solitary confinement in al-Ha'ir Prison. In April 2024, the United Nations Committee on the Rights of Persons with Disabilities ruled that his detention and isolation violated international human rights standards, calling for his immediate release and an independent review. In April 2025, Saudi authorities denied a UN Independent Expert on older persons access to visit al-Hawali during an official country visit. As of 2026, al-Hawali and his family members remained detained.

== Views ==
Like many Saudis, American libertarian politicians and anti-war activists, and indigenous religious communities of the Middle East, former veteran of the Afghan Soviet war Osama bin Laden, and another preacher Salman al-Ouda, al-Hawali opposed the presence of US troops on the Arabian Peninsula. In 1991, al-Hawali delivered a sermon stating: "What is happening in the [Persian] Gulf is part of a larger Western design to dominate the whole Arab and Muslim world." Bin Laden is said to often cite al-Hawali and al-Ouda "to justify his own pronouncements against the United States."

Hawali was invited to the First Meeting of the Saudi National Meeting For Intellectual Dialogue held in June 2003 but declined to attend in protest against the inclusion of `deviants` at the meeting—namely non-Wahhabi religious leaders of the Sunni and Shia Muslim communities of Saudi Arabia. Al-Hawali did, however, condemned al-Qaeda's May 2003 attacks in Riyadh.

== Written works ==
Safar al-Hawali wrote a book on secularism as part of his master thesis at Umm Al-Qura. This research was supervised by Muhammad Qutb, the brother of Sayyid Qutb. Here al-Hawali traced the history of the separation between the church and state and how the idea was imported to the Muslim world. In his Ph.D. research, al-Hawali made an analysis of the separation between the claim of faith and deeds of worship.

In the year 2000, he wrote a treatise on the Second Intifada, entitled The Day of Wrath. He argued that the Biblical prophecies used by Christian fundamentalists to support the state of Israel actually predict its destruction. The treatise was subsequently translated into Hebrew by the Anti-Zionist Neturei Karta group.

After September 11, 2001, al-Hawali wrote an open letter to President Bush.

When 60 American intellectuals issued an article justifying America's war in Iraq, al-Hawali wrote a counter-article, rebutting their claims and pointing to the history of US foreign policy.

Al-Hawali wrote an article in Al-Bayan magazine on unitarianism among Christians. He traced the history of those who reject the doctrine of the Trinity, and believe in One Supreme God. He claimed that monotheists had been subject to great persecution, by both Catholics and Protestants; and that five among the US presidents had been Unitarians. He has also written a book on the history and meaning of Secularism, in his Arabic book Al Ilmaniya. In this book he has identified Church's incapability to cope with challenges of modern world as the main cause of spread of Secular ideologies in Europe.

== Support and criticism ==
He is mentioned in Osama bin Laden's fatwa as a sheikh unjustly arrested allegedly "by orders from the USA."

Samuel P. Huntington included al-Hawali in his famous Clash of Civilizations article. "'It is not the world against Iraq,' as Safar al-Hawali, dean of Islamic Studies at the Umm Al-Qura University in Mecca, put it in a widely circulated tape. 'It is the West against Islam.'"

Al-Hawali was named as a "theologian of terror" in an October 2004 petition to the UN signed by 2,500 Muslim intellectuals calling for a treaty to ban the religious incitement to violence.

== See also ==
- Saudi crackdown on Islamic scholars
