= Ibrahim al-Sakran =

Saudi Islamic scholar (born 1976)

Sheikh Ibrahim al-Sakran
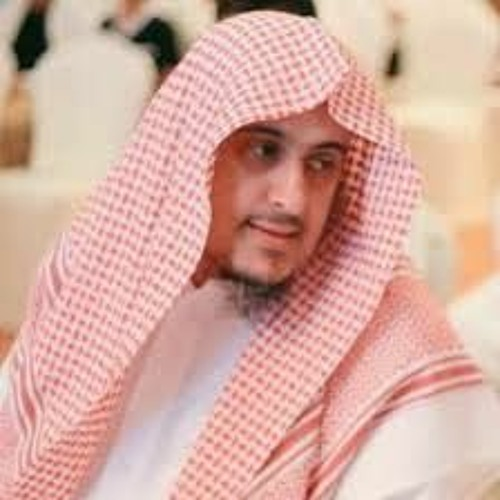
- Born: April 4, 1976 (age 50)
- Education: King Fahd University of Petroleum and Minerals (one year) College of Sharia, Imam Muhammad bin Saud Islamic University (BA) Higher Institute of The Judiciary of Imam Muhammad bin Saud Islamic University (MA in Sharia politics) University of Essex (MA in international trade law)
- Occupations: Islamic scholar, writer, researcher, lawyer, thinker
- Criminal penalty: 5 years of prison
- Criminal status: Released in 2025; subject to travel ban, media ban, and publishing restrictions

Sheikh Ibrahim al-Sakran (born 4 April 1976) is a Saudi Arabian Islamic scholar, writer, researcher, lawyer and thinker.

He was sentenced to five years in prison following his 2016 arrest. He was released in 2020 after serving approximately four years, but was rearrested shortly thereafter.Al-Sakran remained in detention until his release in 2025, after which he has been subject to restrictions including a travel ban, prohibition on media appearances, and a ban on publishing.

== Education ==
He entered the King Fahd University of Petroleum and Minerals and studied for one year and then left the university and went to the College of Sharia at Imam Muhammad bin Saud Islamic University in Riyadh. After graduation he obtained a master's degree in Sharia politics from the Higher Institute of The Judiciary of Imam Muhammad bin Saud Islamic University, then he went to the United Kingdom and received a master's degree in international trade law at the University of Essex in Colchester.

== Arrest ==
In June 2016, Sheikh al-Sakran was arrested at his home in Riyadh by Saudi officials and sentenced to five years of prison. He was then released in 2020 after four years of prison and was rearrested shortly in 2020 after the release.

Following his release in May 2020 after serving part of his five-year sentence, Al-Sakran was rearrested less than a month later without new formal charges or trial. Human rights organizations described the continued detention beyond the original sentence as arbitrary and in violation of international standards. He was reportedly released in 2025, but with strict post-release conditions, including a travel ban, a prohibition from appearing in media, and restrictions on publishing his work.

== See also ==
- Saudi crackdown on Islamic scholars
