= Sahwa movement =

Islamic social mobility movement in Saudi Arabia

Sahwa movement (Arabic: الصحوة, romanized: al-Ṣaḥwa) or al-Sahwa al-Islamiyya (Islamic Awakening) is a religious political movement in Saudi Arabia and other Gulf countries (notably Kuwait and Qatar), which started in the 1960s and reached its apogee in the 1980s. It advocated for an increased reliance on Wahhabi principles in Saudi society by adopting Qutbism. The movement has had an ambivalent relationship with the Saudi authorities, receiving quasi-official sponsorship in the 80s, where it was used as a mobilization vehicle for the Soviet–Afghan War, and during the mid-2000s through mid-2010s, to periods where it was officially proscribed, such as post-1991 Gulf War and after 2015, with many of its proponents either exiled or imprisoned during these periods. The most noticeable effects of the movement were significant restrictions on women's rights, religious freedom, and personal liberties. The movement's core doctrines were shaped by the fundamentalist tenets of Qutbism; such as theological denunciations of democracy and the belief that contemporary governments of the Muslim World have apostatised. In 2018, Mohammed bin Salman, the de facto ruler of Saudi Arabia, said that Saudi Arabia's International propagation of the Salafi movement and Wahhabism campaign was "rooted in the Cold War, when allies asked Saudi Arabia to use its resources to prevent inroads in Muslim countries by the Soviet Union."

Sahwa is a Saudi term that refers to all political Islam movements whose major umbrella is the Qutbi Muslim Brotherhood. Saudi Arabia is almost unique in giving the ulema (the body of Islamic religious leaders and jurists) a direct role in government. The Sahwa-inspired ulema have been a key influence in major government decisions, for example the imposition of the oil embargo in 1973 and the invitation to foreign troops to Saudi Arabia in 1990. In addition, they have had a major role in the judicial and education systems and a monopoly of authority in the sphere of religious and social morals.

The movement came to an end (domestically at least) after the appointment of Crown Prince Mohammad bin Salman in 2017 who declared a return to “moderate Islam”, but the Sahwa's ideas and activists, though persecuted, continue to be popular.

Safar al-Hawali, Muhammad Qutb, Muhammad Surur and Salman al-Ouda are the main scholarly representatives of this movement. The Sahwa movement's calls to forcibly expel American troops from the Islamic World would inspire numerous pan-Islamist militant networks; most noticeably Al-Qaeda. Osama Bin Laden's anti-Americanism was shaped by the major intellectual figures of the Sahwa; who popularised Sayyid Qutb's works and ideas. Saudi suppression of Sahwa trends would lead Bin Laden to excommunicate the government and publicly call to overthrow the Saudi authorities during the early 1990s.

== Origin ==
Muslim Brotherhood members arrived in Saudi Arabia in the 1950s and 1960s seeking refuge from persecution by the Egyptian socialist regime. They always had disputes with Wahhabism. Wahhabism and the Brotherhood influenced each other and this cross-pollination resulted in the birth of a hybrid movement of religious-political dissent known as the Sahwa movement. It reached a peak in the 1990s before being repressed by the Saudi establishment.

Since the Iranian Revolution, however, the idea of clerical rule has become more attractive within Sunni circles. For example, in the Palestinian territories during the early 1980s some Muslim Brothers were unable to find Sunni justifications for active resistance to the Israelis and, therefore, turned to Khomeinist teachings.

== Activities ==
Sahwa members write public petitions and circulate sermons on audio cassettes. Sahwa leaders demand a bigger role for clergy in governing, curbs on the royal family's privileges, greater transparency for public funds, and a more Islamically conservative society as a defense against Western cultural influences.

== Views ==
They oppose the presence of US troops on the Muslim land. In 1991, al-Hawali delivered a sermon stating: "What is happening in the Gulf is part of a larger Western design to dominate the whole Arab and Muslim world."

== See also ==
- Adnan al-Aroor
- Muhammad Surur
