= Madawi al-Rasheed =

Saudi-British professor of social anthropology (born 1962)

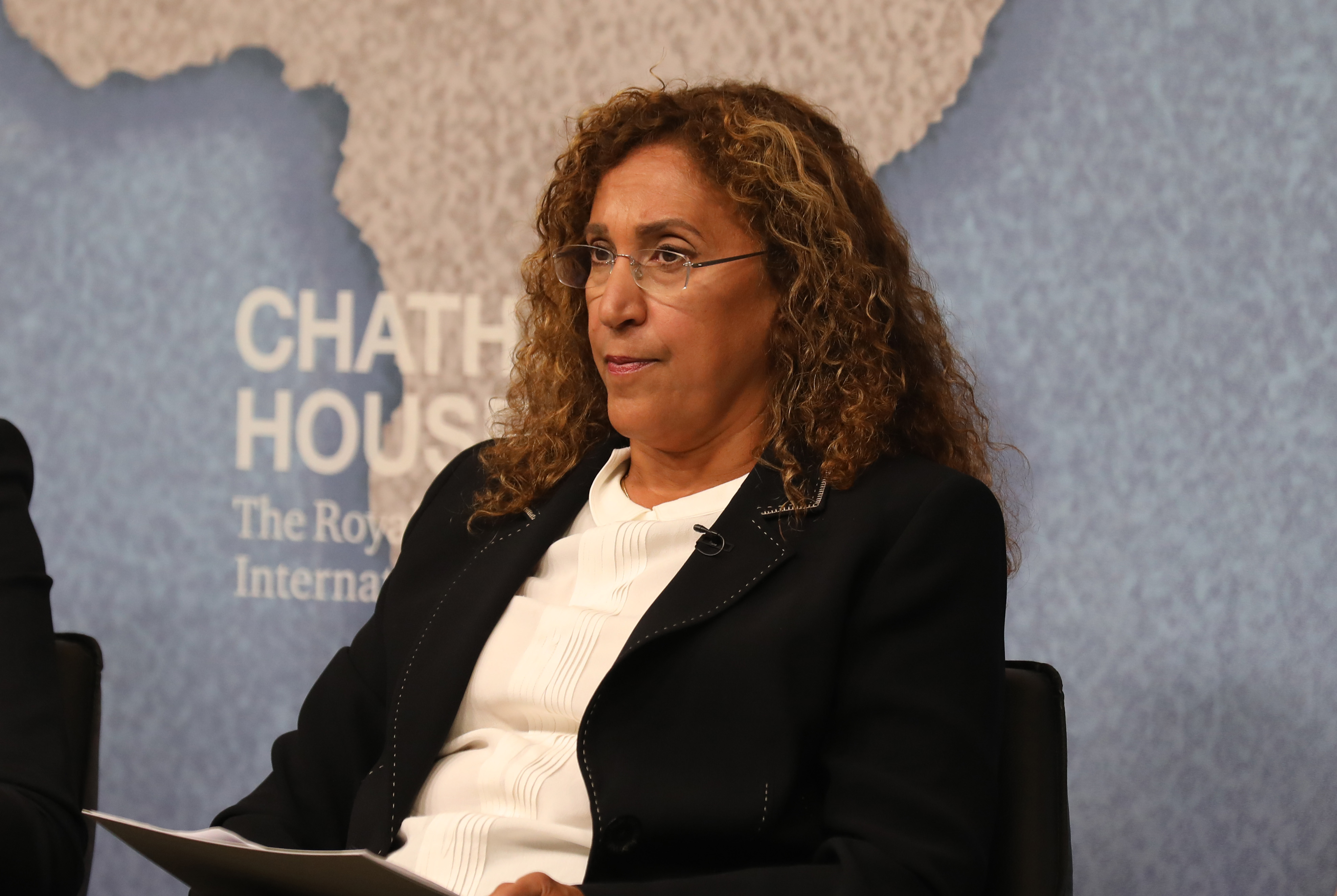
- al-Rasheed in 2018
- Born: October 1962 (age 63); Paris, France
- Education: University of Cambridge
- Political party: National Assembly Party

Madawi al-Rasheed, FBA (Arabic: مضاوي الرشيد; born October 1962) is a British citizen of Saudi origin and a professor of social anthropology. Al-Rasheed has held a position at the Department of Theology and Religious Studies in King's College London and as a Visiting Professor at the Middle East Centre at the London School of Economics and Political Science. She gives occasional lectures in the United States, Europe, and the Middle East. She is the granddaughter of Muhammad bin Talāl al-Rashid, the last prince of the Emirate of Ha'il, which was conquered by the Al-Saud in the early 20th century. She has written several books and articles in academic journals on the Arabian Peninsula, Arab migration, globalisation, gender, and religious transnationalism. As of 2016, she is a Visiting Research Professor at the Middle East Institute at the National University of Singapore.

== Background ==
Al-Rasheed was born in Paris to a Saudi father and a Lebanese mother. Her father descends from the Rashidi dynasty. When al-Rasheed was at a "very early age", the family moved to Saudi Arabia, where al-Rasheed grew up.

In 1975, King Faisal of Saudi Arabia was assassinated by his nephew, Faisal bin Musaid. His mother was a sister of al-Rasheed's father, and the Saudi government accused the Rashidi family of being behind the assassination. Further investigation found this to be untrue, but in 1975, al-Rasheed's family moved to Lebanon, where al‐Rasheed finished her baccalaureate in 1981. She then started her studies in anthropology and sociology at the American University of Beirut.

In 1982, Israel invaded Lebanon. Al-Rasheed went into exile a second time, to the UK, first to Salford University, then to the University of Cambridge, where she obtained her PhD with Ernest Gellner as her supervisor.

In 2005, after an appearance on Al Jazeera TV criticizing the Saudi government, Salman of Saudi Arabia, at the time the governor of Riyadh province, who later became king of Saudi Arabia, telephoned al-Rasheed's father, claiming that her Saudi citizenship was withdrawn as punishment for her television appearance.

Al-Rasheed was one of the targets in the Pegasus spyware scandal, but the attack on her device was apparently unsuccessful.

== Recognition ==
Al-Rasheed was recognized as one of the BBC's 100 women of 2013.

== Selected publications ==
=== Books ===
- 1991 Al-Rasheed M. Politics in an Arabian Oasis: the Rashidi Tribal Dynasty, London: I.B. Tauris
- 1998 Al-Rasheed, M. Iraqi Assyrian Christians in London: the Construction of Ethnicity, New York: Edwin Mellen Press
- 2002 Al-Rasheed, M. A History of Saudi Arabia, Cambridge: Cambridge University Press. Also in Arabic, Spanish and Polish.
- 2005 Al-Rasheed, M. Mazaq Al-islah fi al-Saudiyyah fi al-Qarn al-Wahid wa al-Ishrin, London: al-Saqi
- 2007 Al-Rasheed, M. Contesting the Saudi State: Islamic Voices from a New Generation, Cambridge: Cambridge University Press
- 2010 Al-Rasheed, M. A History of Saudi Arabia, Second Edition, Cambridge: Cambridge University Press
- 2013 Al-Rasheed, M. A Most Masculine State: Gender, Politics and Religion in Saudi Arabia, Cambridge: Cambridge University Press
- 2015 Al-Rasheed, M. Muted Modernists: The Struggle over Divine Politics in Saudi Arabia, Oxford University Press
- 2018 Al-Rasheed. M. Salman's Legacy: The Dilemmas of a New Era in Saudi Arabia, Oxford University Press
- 2020 Al-Rasheed. M. The Son King: Reform and Repression in Saudi Arabia, Hurst Publishers

=== Edited books ===
- 2004 Al-Rasheed, M. & R Vitalis (eds.) Counter-Narratives: History, Contemporary Society and Politics in Saudi Arabia and Yemen, New York, Palgrave
- 2005 Al-Rasheed, M. (ed.) Transnational Connections and the Arab Gulf, London: Routledge.
- 2008 Al-Rasheed, M. (ed.) Kingdom without Borders: Saudi Political, Religious and Media Expansion, London: Hurst and Co.
- 2009 Al-Rasheed, M. & M. Shterin. (eds.) Dying for Faith: Religiously Motivated Violence in the Contemporary World, London: I.B. Tauris.
- 2012 Al-Rasheed, M. Kersten, C. and Shterin, M. (eds,) Demystifying the Caliphate: Historical Memory and Contemporary Contexts, London: Hurst and Co.
