= Salman al-Ouda =

Saudi Muslim Scholar (born 1956)

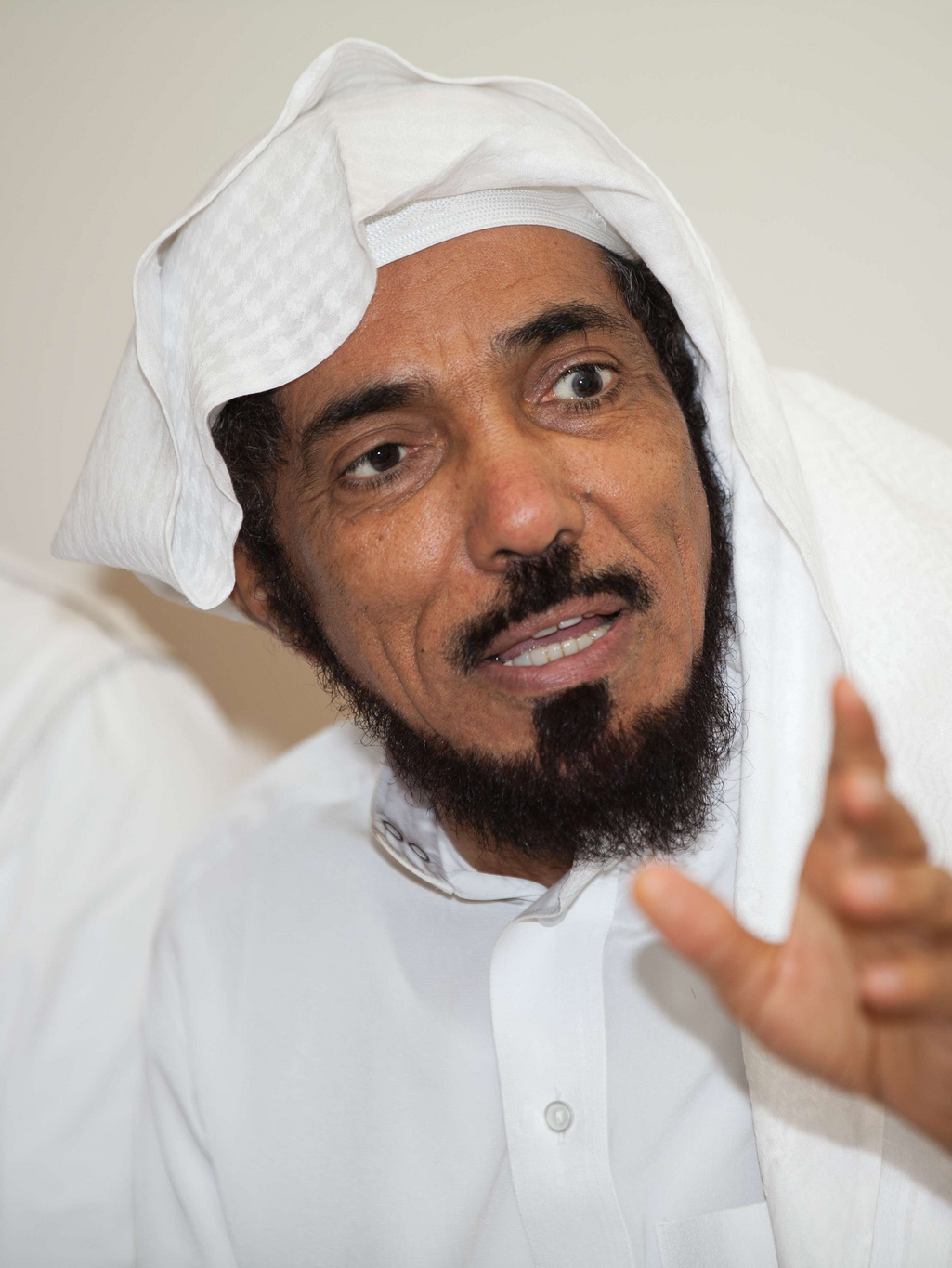
- Salman al-Ouda in May 2012

Personal life
- Born: 14 December 1956 (age 69) al-Qassim, Saudi Arabia
- Children: Abdullah Al-Ouda
- Main interest: Sharia
- Education: the Faculty of Sharia and Religious Principles in al-Qassim

Religious life
- Religion: Islam
- Denomination: Sunni
- Lineage: Bani Khalid
- Jurisprudence: Hanbali
- Movement: Sahwa

Muslim leader
- Influenced by: Ibn Baz, Ibn Jibrin, Muhammad Surur, Sayyid Qutb
- Influenced: Muhammad al-'Arifi, Yasir Qadhi

Salman bin Fahd bin Abdullah al-Ouda (Arabic: سلمان بن فهد بن عبد الله العودة الجبري الخالدي; born 14 December 1956) simply known as Salman al-Ouda (Arabic: سلمان العودة, Salmān al-ʻAwdah), also known by his kunya as Abu Mu'ad (Arabic: أبو معاذ), is a Saudi Islamic scholar. Al-Ouda is a member of the International Union for Muslim Scholars and on its board of trustees. He was a director of the Arabic edition of the website Islam Today and appeared on a number of TV shows and authored newspaper articles.

In 1993, al-Ouda was one of the leaders of the dissident group Committee for the Defense of Legitimate Rights (CDLR) that challenged the Saudi government, for which he was imprisoned during 1994–1999. He was viewed as a government supporter by 2007. He was detained again by the Saudi authorities in September 2017. As of July 2018, he remained in solitary confinement without charge or trial. Officials imposed travel bans on members of his family. He was arrested for his refusal to comply with an order by Saudi authorities to tweet a specific text to support the Saudi-led blockade of Qatar. In the 4 September 2018 legal hearing, prosecutors applied for al-Ouda to be sentenced to death.

== Family background ==
Salman Al-Ouda was born in 1956 in al-Basr, near the city of Burayda in Al-Qassim in central Saudi Arabia to Fahd Al-Ouda who belonged to the Al-Ouda branch of the aristocratic Bani Khalid. The Bani Khalid had an established Emirate in the Eastern region of the Arabian Peninsula, with control from the town of Kuwait to the Najd during the 17th and 18th centuries before their fall to the Al-Saud Dynasty from the Bani Hanifa. He spent his early years in al-Basr, then moved to Burayda.

== Family life ==
Al-Ouda was married to Haya al-Sayari. His eldest son is named Muadh. In January 2017, a traffic accident killed al-Ouda's son Hisham and his wife Haya. Condolences to al-Ouda over this accident were given on Twitter by Mohamad al-Arifi, Aid al-Qarni, Ibrahim al-Dawish, Hassan al-Husseini, Ziyad al-Shahri, Nayef al-Sahfe, Moussa al-Omar, and Muhammad al-Yaqoubi.

== Education ==
Al-Ouda joined an educational institute in Burayda, where he spent six years. He studied under scholars such as Ibn Baz, al-Uthaymin and Ibn Jibrin. In Burayda, he studied Arabic grammar, Hanbali jurisprudence and hadith under the guidance of local sheikhs. He completed a B.A., M.A. and Ph.D. in Islamic jurisprudence at Imam Muhammad bin Sa'ud University.

He graduated from the Faculty of Sharia and Religious Principles in Qassim, then became a teacher at the Scientific Institutes there. He wrote the book (Arabic: أفعل ولا حرج) (English: Do No Wrong), which became well known.

== Career ==
In 1990 Salman al-Ouda was a teacher at the main mosque in Burayda. He gave weekly lessons for the general public at the mosque and other lessons where he gave commentary on the book Bulûgh al-Marâm. He gave daily lessons after the Morning Prayer, where he talked about the authoritative collections of Hadith - Sahîh al-Bukhârî, Sahîh Muslim and discussed the Qur'an. He described the content of the books Kitâb al-Tawhîd by Muhammad ibn Abd al-Wahhab, al-Usûl al-Thalâthah, and Nukhbah al-Fikr.

The 1990–1991 Gulf Crisis and War, in which an American-led coalition of forces aligned against the Iraqi regime of Saddam Hussein in response to its seizure of Kuwait, proved an opportunity for al-Ouda and others to tap into an already-existing current of discontent within the Kingdom. When the then-Grand Mufti Abd al-Aziz bin Baz issued a fatwa lending Islamic justification for the regime to invite American forces to defend Saudi Arabia from Hussein, al-Ouda raised questions about the ability of the Saudi military to defend the Kingdom with so much investment in U.S. armaments. During the war, al-Ouda was a moving force behind two reform petitions addressed to the King. The first, in 1991, was known as the Letter of Demands and was signed by leading Saudi religious, mercantile, and socially prominent figures seeking changes in the form of government, notably the establishment of a Shura (consultative) Council. A year later, the second petition, known as the Memorandum of Advice, which was signed by more than one hundred religious scholars, including establishment Ulama, called for a Shura Council as well as media censorship under religious guidance and review of all the kingdom's laws to insure their conformity with Shari'a. Both petitions expressed loyalty to the house of Sa'ud while opposing the lack of representation in the existing government. Meanwhile, audiotapes of al-Ouda's sermons gained wide circulation and encouraged to other opposition voices after the first Gulf War, as the United States military settled in for a long stay at an airbase outside the capital.

Al-Ouda was one of the leaders of the Committee for the Defense of Legitimate Rights (CDLR) that was a Saudi dissident group created in 1993 and was the first ever opposition organization in the Kingdom openly challenging the absolute monarchy, accusing the government and senior Saudi scholars of not doing enough to protect the legitimate Islamic rights of the Muslims.

== Legal cases ==
In September 1994, Salman al-Ouda was imprisoned for alleged "anti-government activities." He and Safar al-Hawali were arrested together with a large number of their followers in the city of Burayda, Qasim region.

Following his five years of imprisonment for having incited opposition to the Saudi government, al-Ouda emerged "rehabilitated" in 1999 to become one of the kingdom's most prominent religious spokespersons. With a television program and a website in four languages, he was viewed in 2007 as a supporter of the Saudi government, operating under its protection and in competition with the government-sponsored establishment Ulama (clergy). He was also an advocate for Sunni-Shia dialogue, calling for a more inclusive society that would end the marginalization of Saudi Shia citizens.

In May 2017 he was banned along with Bilal Philips and four others from entering Denmark for a period of two years over concerns that they would preach hate towards Danish society and indoctrinate others to commit violence against women and children and disseminate ideas about a caliphate. The name was removed from the list shortly before its expiration (2 May 2019), without explanation.

In September 2017, Al-Ouda, along with other prominent preachers and activists such as Awad Al-Qarni and Ali Al-Omari, were arrested by the Saudi authorities for "terrorism and conspiracy against the state". Calls have been made by "international and Islamic personalities and organisations for their release" and concern has mounted since 37 Saudis were executed in April 2019 for what authorities said were "terrorism-related crimes", one of the charges against Al-Ouda. According to Amnesty International, al-Ouda was arrested "a few hours after posting a tweet welcoming reports of a possible reconciliation between Saudi Arabia and Qatar" which Saudi Crown Prince Muhammad bin Salman had blockaded since June 2017.

As of December 2020, Al-Ouda's son, Abdullah Al-Ouda, stated that his father had "lost almost half of his ability to hear and see" in prison. In an op-ed piece in The New York Times, Abdullah Alaoudh highlighted the deteriorating condition of his father Salman al-Ouda, who was kept in solitary confinement in Saudi Arabia. The Saudi scholar and activist said that due to three years of abuse and isolation, his father's physical and mental condition has been declining at a greater pace. He also appealed President-elect Joe Biden to push the Saudi government to release his father and other political prisoners.

As of 2026, al-Ouda remains detained in al-Ha'ir Prison, with his trial stalled since his last hearing in July 2021. Authorities have repeatedly delayed or suspended proceedings, leaving his case in limbo. He has been held in prolonged solitary confinement for over eight years, which human rights organizations describe as amounting to torture or ill-treatment under international law.

His health has deteriorated significantly due to conditions of detention, including reported partial loss of hearing and eyesight, and inadequate medical care. In April 2025, Saudi authorities denied a United Nations Independent Expert on older persons access to al-Ouda during an official visit to al-Ha'ir Prison.

Amnesty International, Human Rights Watch, and other groups have repeatedly called for his immediate and unconditional release, citing arbitrary detention, unfair trial risks, and violations of freedom of expression and religion.

== Books and online publishing ==
Among the roughly fifty books that he has published are:

- The First Strangers,
- Characteristics of the Strangers,
- Withdrawing from Society and Participating in It',
- A Discussion with Sheikh Muhammad al-Ghazâlî,
- Who has the Right to Engage in Independent Juristic Reasoning?
- Guidelines for Studying Islamic Law.
- The strangers,
- How to differ?
- If I were a bird,
- Ramadan lessons, and
- with Allah.

The anti-government content of some of his books and some of the lessons that he had given was a factor in al-Ouda's 1994–1999 imprisonment. He was quoted by Osama bin Laden in his 1994 Open Letter to Shaykh Bin Baz on the Invalidity of his Fatwa on Peace with the Jews. After his release, al-Ouda resumed his activities from his home, giving lessons from Wednesday to Friday weekly on topics such as Qur'anic commentary, ethics, education, and personal reform.

Al-Ouda stated that he supports peace and tolerance with other religions. He announced that this was a result of deeper understanding of Islamic teachings.

Al-Ouda is in charge of the popular website "IslamToday". He gives classes and lectures over the Internet to a wide range of listeners. He works daily in answering the questions that people send to him in addition to compiling and preparing a number of his writings for publication. He had a show on MBC TV.

In 2006, around 20,000 young British Muslims in London's East End listened to a speech by al-Ouda. Sheikh Salman has over 4,000 Facebook friends and over one million fans through the site. He has 14 million followers on Twitter.

Ownership of one of al-Ouda's works was cited by the Saudi government as an additional charge for the 45 year imprisonment of academic Nourah al-Qahtani. This book was described in The Guardian by al-Ouda's son as "very apolitical".

== Rebuking Osama bin Laden ==
Al-Ouda is known not only for criticizing the September 11 attacks, but also for directly criticizing Osama bin Laden. In 2007, around the sixth anniversary of 11 September, he addressed Al Qaeda's leader on MBC, a widely watched Middle Eastern television network, asking him:

My brother Osama, how much blood has been spilled? How many innocent people, children, elderly, and women have been killed ... in the name of Al Qaeda? Will you be happy to meet God Almighty carrying the burden of these hundreds of thousands or millions of victims on your back?

== See also ==
- Saudi crackdown on Islamic scholars
- Safar al-Hawali
- Nabil Al Awadi
- Mohamad al-Arefe
- Muhammad Surur
- Sahwa movement
