= Qassim University =

University in Saudi Arabia

- جامعة القصيم
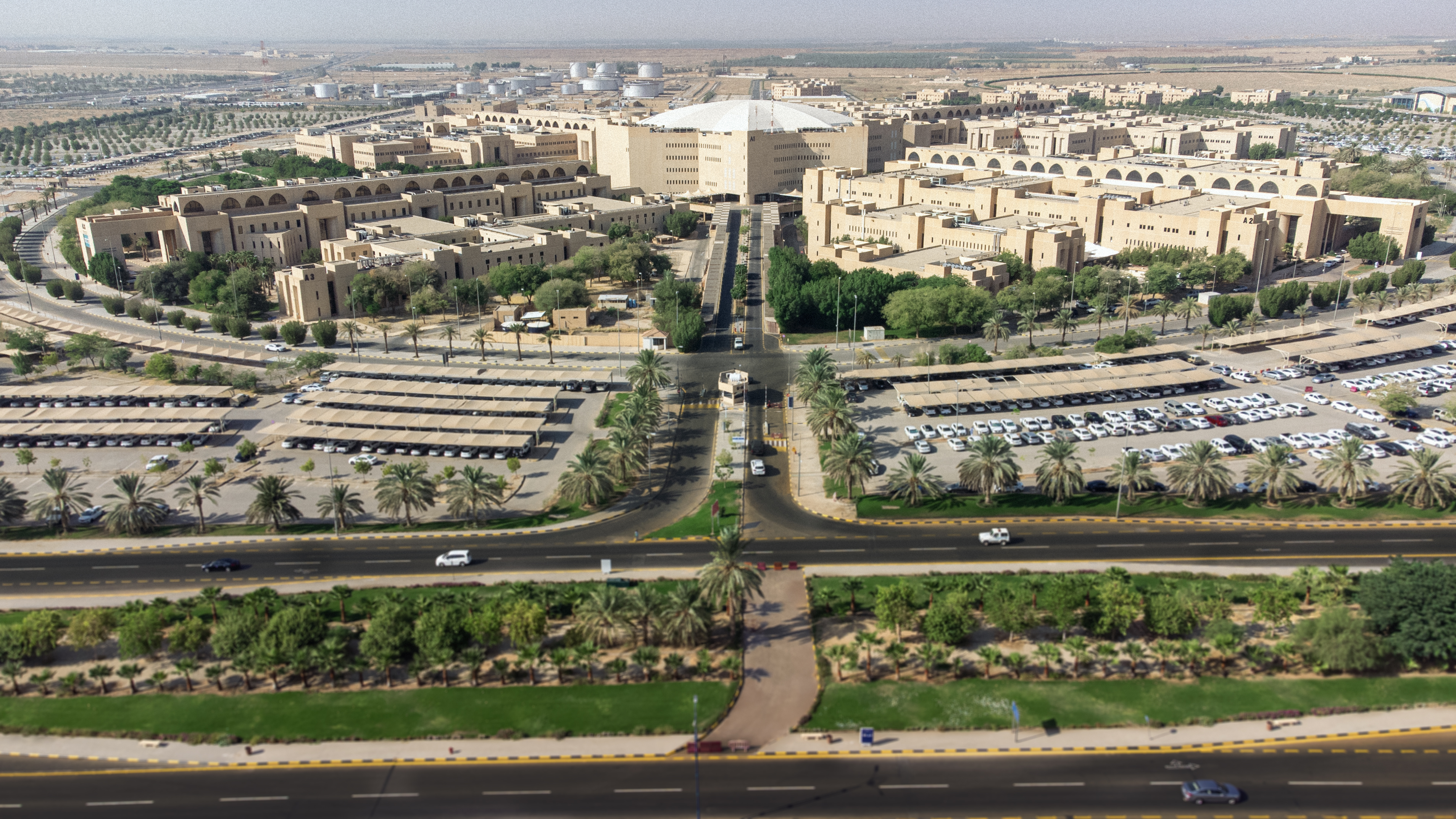
- Type: Public
- Established: 2004; 22 years ago
- Rector: Prof. Muhammad Alsharekh
- Administrative staff: 3,500
- Students: 75,000
- Location: Buraydah, Qassim, Saudi Arabia
- Colors: Blue and white
- Website: http://www.qu.edu.sa/

Qassim University is a major public university in Saudi Arabia. The main campus of Qassim University covers about eight square kilometers in the heart of the region. Qassim University has over 38 Colleges, offering over 30 PhD, 70 master's, 120 Bachelor's and diploma degrees. Qassim University has over 50,000 students. 6000 Faculty and staff members. During 2016/2017 academic year, 7019 male and 9692 female students were newly enrolled at Qassim University. Qassim University is among the top 7 Saudi universities. In 2015, QS ranked Qassim University as 46 among Arab Region Rankings.

Colleges at Qassim University include Sharia College; the College of Arabic Language and Social Sciences; the College of Agricultural and Veterinary Sciences; a College of Economics; a College of Science; a College of Medicine; a College of Engineering; a College of Computer; a College of Applied Medical Sciences; a College of Dentistry and a College of Pharmacy.

There is also a Science College in Al-Zilfi, community colleges.

== Location ==
central hall of new Qassim University building

The main campus is located in the middle of Al-Qassim Province in Mulaida outskirt area 15 km west of Buraydah beside Saudi Aramco (Qassim Branch) and Prince Naif bin Abdulaziz International Airport. Sub-campuses are sited and also there are colleges scattered in several other cities of province.

Qassim University (QU) appeared in the QS World University Rankings for the first time in 2011. According to the QS report, it has shown excellent potential for strengthening its position by harnessing its core strengths in teaching and Research. QU has published Research papers with institutions ranked in top 100 of the 2011 rankings. QU has also shown initiative in arranging International Seminars in order to develop relations with global academic peers.

In November 2015, AACSB has announced that Qassim University has earned accreditation for its College of Business and Economics (CBE). AACSB stands for Association to Advance Collegiate Schools of Business. It was founded in 1916 and it is the longest serving global accrediting body for business schools that offer undergraduate, master's, and doctorate degrees in business and accounting.

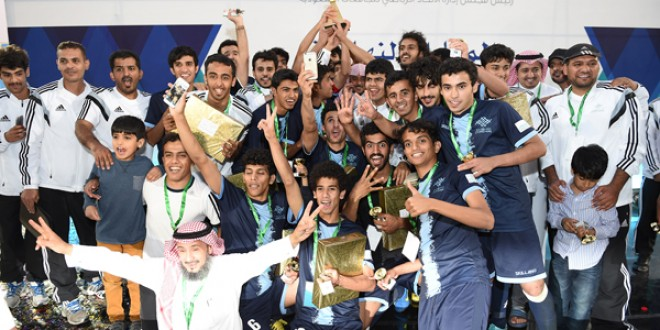
University Sports at Alqassim

== Accreditations ==
University rankings

Global – Overall
- ARWU World: 801–900 (2023)
- QS World: 901–950 (2024)
- THE World: 801–1000 (2024)
- USNWR Global: =1726 (2023)

ABET: Qassim Engineering College EE, CE, and ME B.Sc. programs delivered on the main campus are accredited by the ABET (EAC). Also College of computer has been accredited by ABET.

QS Benchmarking: Qassim University is currently being benchmarked by QS against its national and international peers. The benchmarking provides a detailed map of the university's strengths and weaknesses in various academic markers.

NCAAA: Qassim University is currently undergoing the accreditation process by National Commission for Academic Accreditation and Assessment (NCAAA).

ASIIN e.V : Qassim University is also undergoing the certification of quality management systems in systems accreditation.

COE: Community College in Buraidh obtained the accreditation from The Council on Occupational Education (COE) in July 2012.

== Controversies ==
In 2015, a building under construction on campus collapsed causing the death of 7 migrant workers.

In 2022, news of a ban imposed on female students wearing trousers caused a stir on social media.

== Women and gender issues ==
Issues of exploitation and casualization of women labor were reported in local media as female workers demanded better working conditions. In 2016, a local media website, Sabq, reported that a number of female teachers, who were assigned to teach as casual labor without a signed written contract, were demanding their over due pay for two years.

== Colleges ==
=== Main campus ===
- Preparatory Year Unit
- College of Engineering
- College of Agriculture and Veterinary
- College of Medicine
- College of Dentistry
- College of Applied Medical Science
- College of Computer
- College of Pharmacy
- College of Nursing
- College of Management and Economics
- College of Architecture and Planning
- College of Sciences
- College of Islamic Law Sharia & Religion Principles
- College of Arabic Language and Humanities
- College of Education

=== Sub-campuses ===
- College of Science in Zelfi
- Community College in Buraydah center.
- College of Science and Arts in Buraydah center.
- College of Home Design in Buraydah center.
- College of Medical Rehabilitation in Buraydah center.
- Community College in Unaizah
- College of Medicine and medical science Unaizah
- College of Health Sciences Unaizah
- College of Engineering Unaizah
- College of Science and Arts Unaizah
- College of Science and Arts Ar Rass
- College of Health Sciences Ar Rass
- College of Science and Arts Al-Bukairiyah
- College of Health Sciences Al-Bukairiyah
- College of Science and Arts Al-Methnab
- College of Science and Arts Oqlat-Assogoor
- College of Science and Arts ( Al- Badayea)

=== Women Colleges ===
- Faculty of Dentistry
- Faculty of Applied Medical Sciences (a subsidiary of the main campus).
- Faculty of Pharmacy (a subsidiary of the main campus).
- Computer College (a subsidiary of the main campus).
- College of Human Medicine (a subsidiary of the main campus).
- College of Business (a subsidiary of the main campus).
- Faculty of Health Sciences for Girls in Buraidah (in preparation)
- Faculty of Health Sciences for Girls in Onaizah (in preparation)
- College of Education for Girls in Buraidah (Psychology - Special Education - kindergarten)
- Faculty of Arts and Sciences in Buraidah (English Literature - Arabic language - Islamic Studies - Computer - Preparation of Natural Sciences)
- Faculty of Arts and Sciences in Onaizah (English Literature - Arabic language - Islamic Studies - Preparation of Natural Sciences)
- Faculty of Arts and Sciences in Rass (English Literature - Arabic language - Islamic studies - studies the Koran - Computer Sciences - the preparation of Natural Sciences)
- Faculty of Arts and Sciences in Al-Bukairiyah (English Literature - Arabic language - Preparation Natural Sciences)
- Faculty of Science and Arts in Oqlat-Assogoor (English Literature - Arabic language - Preparation Natural Sciences)
- Faculty of Arts and Sciences in the Muznib (Computer Science - English - Islamic Studies -Mathematics - Physics)
- Faculty Design and Home Economics in Buraidah (Nutrition and Food Science - Art Education - Fashion Design)
- Faculty of Arts and Sciences in Riyadh Al Khabra (Physics - Mathematics - Kindergarten)
- Faculty of Arts and Science in Al-Badayea ( English - Mathematics- Physics)

== See also ==
- List of universities and colleges in Saudi Arabia
- Al-Qassim Province
