= Ideology of the Islamic State =

Extremist interpretation of Salafi jihadism

The Ideology of the Islamic State has been described as a blend of Salafi jihadism, Sunni Islamist fundamentalism, Wahhabism, and Qutbism. Through its official statement of beliefs originally released by its first leader Abu ʿUmar al-Baghdadi in 2007 and subsequently updated from June 2014 onward, the Islamic State defined its creed (ʿaqida) as "a middle way between the extremist Kharijites and the lax Murjiʾites".

Core doctrines of IS include its belief that it represents the restoration of the Caliphate (khilafa) of early Islam – modeled on the first Islamic state in Medina and the Rashidun Caliphate – governed upon the "Prophetic Methodology" (manhaj), to which all Muslims are required to pledge allegiance (bayʿa); that strict adherence to the precepts "established by the Prophet Muhammad and his earliest followers" – specifically the Ṣaḥaba, Ahl al-Bayt, and the wider first three generations of Muslims (Salaf) – is mandatory; that a "defiled" Islam must be purged of apostasy (ridda) and polytheism (shirk), often through sectarian killings; and that the final Day of Judgment by God will follow the defeat of the army of "Rome" by IS.

While scholars debate the extent to which rank-and-file members grasp the nuances of IS theology, the group's official media outlets and leadership have historically stressed the centrality of ʿaqida and manhaj – the primary terms used to define its ideological framework – and demanded strict adherence to them from its members. In a similar vein, Princeton scholar Bernard Haykel, who specializes in the study of IS, argues that many Western observers fail to understand the passionate attachment of IS – including its rank and file – to religious doctrine, noting that "even the foot soldiers spout Qurʾanic verses" constantly. Fawaz A. Gerges likewise writes that "researchers have tended to underestimate the power of the salafi-jihadist ideology" – which he identifies as ISIL ideology – "at their own peril".

== Tenets ==
=== Origins ===
The ideology of the Islamic State is based on the tenets of Al-Qaʿida literature that had ascended in the Jihadist field since the 1980s. The core features of Jihadist literature during this era were outlined by the influential Egyptian Islamist scholar Sayyid Qutb (d. 1966 C.E/ 1386 A.H), who believed that Islamic principles had become titular and condemned his society as being sunk in a state of Jahiliyya (pre-Islamic ignorance). To overcome this state, Qutb proposed the implementation of the Ḥakimiyya doctrine, which espoused the Sovereignty of God in all aspects of life. This was to be achieved by the overthrow of the modern-day nation-states and the subsequent establishment of an Islamic order based on the society of Muhammad and his companions (Sahaba), through armed Jihad. Those Muslims who opposed their principles were considered renegades (Murtaddin) guilty of apostasy. Qutb drew his revolutionary ideals mainly from the works of medieval theologians Ibn Taymiyya (d. 1328 C.E/ 728 A.H) and Ibn al-Qayyim (d. 1350 C.E/ 751 A.H); who strongly condemned the cult of saints and practices related to grave veneration. Qutb re-oriented Ibn Taymiyya's critiques against what he described as the "modern idols", i.e., the contemporary nation-states. These reinvigorated doctrines would shape the Salafi jihadist theology from the 1970s, represented by organisations like Al-Qaʿida, Egyptian Islamic Jihad, etc. The Islamic State regards itself as the true successor of these theological doctrines and accuses Al-Qaʿida leadership under Ayman az-Zawahiri of being deviated. Unlike Al-Qaʿida, IS was also able to implement these doctrines in its territories during its brief stint of power in parts of Iraq and Syria during 2014-2019.

According to Professor Bartosz Bolechów of the University of Warsaw, the ideology of the Islamic State was formed as a consequence of ideological radicalisation in response to the war on terror launched after 9/11. Asserting that the binary worldview of the Islamic State and its ideological evolution is compatible with the conclusions of Terror Management Theory (TMT), Bolechów states:

"Jihadi, revolutionary variant of Salafism is a modern phenomenon inspired initially by the writings of Sayyid Qutb (and then by scholars like Abu Muhammad al-Maqdisi and Abu Basir al-Tartusi) and born as a reaction to Islamic political fragmentation (after the fall of Ottoman Empire), colonization (by Western powers) and modernization.. If Jihadi-Salafism should be understood as a radical fringe of Salafism, the ideology of the Islamic State is so far its most extreme version. Some scholars are calling this variant Neo-Takfirism to stress the fact of its strained or even openly hostile relations with more "traditional" strains of jihadi organizations, its thinkers and leaders. This new variant is definitely an indirect byproduct of 9/11 and direct byproduct of GWOT: the chain of events started by the disruption of Al-Qaeda central in Afghanistan and then continued with an intervention in Iraq.. GWOT basically supported the narrative of the revolutionary Salafism: that counterterrorism is only a pretext used by the West in its historical quest for destroying Islam. It was a leading force and a key factor behind a further radicalization of an already radical worldview."

Egyptian Jihadist theoretician and ideologue Abu ʿAbdullah al-Muhajir, is widely regarded as the "theologian who shaped ISIS". His works provided the most influential inspiration for modern jihadist strategies. Al-Muhajir's legal manual on violence, Fiqh ad-Dimaʾ (The Jurisprudence of Blood), became IS's standard reference for justifying its extraordinary acts of violence. The book has been described by counter-terrorism scholar Orwa Ajjoub as rationalizing and justifying "suicide operations, the mutilation of corpses, beheading, and the killing of children and non-combatants". While jihadist Fiqh (jurisprudence) generally maintains the classical consensus prohibiting the intentional targeting of children and specified categories of non-combatants (Ghayr Muqatilin) among Ahl al-Ḥarb, al-Muhajir circumvents these restrictions by broadly expanding classical legal exceptions such as collateral damage through human shields (Tatarrus) and night raids (Bayat) His theological and legal justifications influenced IS, al-Qaʿida and Boko Haram, as well as several other jihadi terrorist groups.

Fawaz A. Gerges believes that IS has drawn from Salafi-Jihadists' "repertoire of ideas and selectively borrowed whatever fits its unique worldview". In particular, he believes IS has drawn from three works that share an advocacy of offensive Jihad, opposition to any gradualism or political activity, attacking the near enemy, not just the far, observing no limits in killing and brutalizing as extreme violence, as this is following the way of the Prophet and is the best way to bring the enemy to submission. Three works are:

- Management of Savagery (Idarat at-Tawaḥḥush). Written under the pseudonym Abu Bakr al-Najji and published online around 2004. The most famous of the three works, it has been described by several journalists and analysts as influential to IS, and intended to provide a strategy to create a new Islamic Caliphate. Among its important points are that earlier jihadists wasted time on preaching, neglecting killing and destruction. "We must drag all the people to battle and bring the temple down on the heads of everyone". After all, "the worst chaotic condition is by far preferable to stability under the system of apostasy", and even "if the whole Umma [community of Muslims] perishes" during jihadi generated fighting, "they would all be martyrs (šuhadā)ʾ".
- An Introduction to the Jurisprudence of Jihad by Abu ʿAbdullah al-Muhajir. According to this interpretation of jihad "killing Kuffar and fighting them in their Homeland is a necessity even if they do not harm Muslims". It doesn't really matter if enemy killed are considered belligerents or civilians because the main reason for "killing them and confiscating their property" is that "they are not Muslims". While it does not reject the distinction between combatants and non-combatants in general, it utilizes a selective reading of Islamic jurisprudence on war (siyār) to redefine the status of combatant (muqātil) and non-combatant (ghayr muqātil), as well as which methods of warfare are considered legitimate.
- The Essentials of Making Ready [for Jihad] by Sayyid Imam al-Sharif, (also known as Abdel-Qader Ibn Abdel-Aziz or Dr. Fadl). This work focuses on Ḥakimiyya or rule of God, and differs somewhat from the others in encouraging attacks on the far as well as near enemy. Its author asserts that Jihad against the near enemy – meaning any Muslim ruler who governs by non-sharʿi law and is therefore considered a Ṭaghut – is fard al-ʿayn, an islamic obligation generally for every Muslim male 15 and over, unless they have a valid religious excuse (ʿudhr sharʿī). Anyone who avoids Jihad in the path of God betrays Allah, Muhammad, and Islam as whole.

The classical references of IS mainly consist of the medieval legal literature of Ibn Taymiyya, Ibn Qayyim al-Jawziyya and various collections of hadiths and their exegeses. Contemporary scholarly references relied upon by IS include the 19th-century treatises of wahhabi Aal al-Shaykhs, treatises of Sayyid Qutb, Juhayman al-Otaybi, as well as the popular jihadi literature produced by the exponents of the Sahwa movement, Shuʿaybi school and Al-Qaʿida. Major references also consist of the legal works of various scholars influential in the salafi tradition, such as the early 19th-century Yemeni theologian Muhammad Al-Shawkani. The writings of classical theologian Ibn Taymiyya are disproportionately cited throughout IS pamphlets, propaganda videos and magazines. Throughout their works, IS ideologues refer to Ibn Taymiyya by the title "Shaykh al-Islam". As of 2019, Ibn Taymiyya has been cited more than 40,000 times out of all the 300,000 pages published by various AQ and IS Publications. However, IS strategists are highly selective in appropriating the ideas found in scholarly literature; by molding them to align with their revolutionary propaganda and militant ideology.

Ash-Shawkani's tracts condemning the building over graves, in particular, are often abbreviated, re-published and distributed via IS propaganda material and leaflets. During its occupation of Mosul, IS distributed Shawkani's treatises that advocated the "levelling" of tombs and elevated graves, asserting it as a core religious doctrine. Following the doctrines of Shawkani, IS excommunicated those who visit graves to beseech the dead for "supernatural aid" (istighātha fī al-umūr al-ghaybiyya) and assistance in matters in which "only Allah's aid is to be sought". Executions of captured enemy combatants suspected of being "Rafiḍites" are also justified through these writings. Despite resistance from the local populace, IS engaged in a campaign of destroying the tombs of various saints throughout its three-year reign in Mosul.

Various scholars assert that the Islamic State misappropriates classical scholarly fatwas (legal verdicts) to justify their ruthless religious interpretations that diverge from traditional Sunnism, including mainstream Salafism. IS ideologues often accuse their religious critics of being guilty of Taqlid (blind following), for disagreeing with their brutal execution methods and violent tactics like suicide bombings. IS magazines such as Dabiq and Dar al-Islam regularly publish numerous articles fervently denouncing those who fall into Taqlid as "heretics" (Zanadiqa) since "it implies following someone other than Allah and his messenger". Dabiq magazine published an article in 2015 titled "The Evil of Division and Taqlid", which emphasized the obligation to follow Prophetic commands and condemned the practice of imitating scholarly verdicts without a basis in scriptures. An example of this literalism was manifested in the 2015 burning to death of Jordanian pilot Muath al-Kasasbeh which was justified by IS based on Qiṣaṣ ("eye for an eye") principle in the Qurʾan.

=== Demands of the Caliphate ===
Having declared itself to be a new Caliphate (khilāfa), more specifically a " Caliphate on the Prophetic Methodology" (ʿalā minhāj un-Nubuwwa) and Abu Bakr al-Baghdadi to be the new Caliph (khalīfa), IS has declared "We inform the Muslims that, with the announcement of the Caliphate, it has become obligatory for all Muslims to give Bayʾa and support him", and "O Muslims in all places. Whoso is able to emigrate to the Islamic State, let him emigrate. For emigration to the Abode of Islam is obligatory". This holds true for all other jihadi groups, including Al-Qaʿida, which (IS believes) has lost its reason for existing independently.

Salafi Jihadists such as IS believe that only a legitimate authority can undertake the leadership of Jihad, and that the first priority over other areas of combat, such as fighting non-muslim countries, is the purification of islamic society. For example, IS regards the (non-Salafi) Palestinian islamist sunni group Hamas as apostates who have no legitimate authority to lead Jihad and it regards fighting Hamas as the first step before confrontation with Israel.

But IS goes further, ordering all Jihadists everywhere that they obey and must pledge their loyalty to the commander of the faithful — i.e., their now deceased caliph Abu Bakr al-Baghdadi. The Seriousness of IS about this demand for obedience is reflected in its conflict with the Al-Nusra Front in Syria, a group which declined to pledge loyalty to ISIL and opposed them. The fight has involved "beheadings and crucifixions" and killed "thousands of skilled fighters from both sides".

=== Offensive Jihad ===
According to Hayder al-Khoei, the central importance of the restoration of the Caliphate of early Islam to IS's philosophy is symbolized by the Black Standard IS has adopted, a variant of the legendary battle flag of Muhammad displaying the Seal of Muhammad within a white circle, with the phrase above it, "There is no God but Allah".

All traditional islamic scholars (ʿUlamaʾ) believe in Offensive Jihad, but the majority of them also say that Offensive Jihad must be performed by the Caliphate. According to jihadist preacher Anjem Choudary, "Hitherto, we were just defending ourselves," but now IS can fight to the forcible expansion into countries that are ruled by Non-Muslims. Waging of war to expand the Caliphate is an essential duty of the Caliph, so according to its ideological supporters like Anjem Choudary, IS is not just allowed to fight offensively but forbidden not to.

The work The Management of Savagery describes three stages of Jihad.

1. In stage one Shawkat an-Nikaya wa-l-Inhak ("Power of Vexation and Exhaustion") the "will of the enemy" would be broken by destruction of "vital economic and strategic targets such as oil facilities and the tourism infrastructure". Concentrating security forces to protect these sensitive targets will cause the state to weaken and its powers wither, bringing "savagery and chaos." Salafi-Jihadists would then take advantage of this security vacuum, by launching an all-out battle on the thinly dispersed security forces.
2. Once the state has been overthrown, the "administration or management of savagery" (Idarat at-Tawaḥḥush) will follow. The "law of the jungle" will prevail and survivors will "accept any organization, regardless of whether it is made up of good or evil people," and Jihadis will step in to provide organization, administering Shariʿa law.
3. The final stage, "empowerment" (Marhalat at-Tamkin), will establish the islamic state, ruled by a single leader who would then unify diffuse and scattered groups and regions of "savagery" in a Caliphate. Despite the enormous suffering and loss of life caused by the forces of Jihad, through a mixture of persuasion and coercion, they will (according to Najji) win hearts and minds and gain legitimacy and recognition for islamic rule.

=== Importance of Salafism ===
Author Graeme Wood has noted the importance of the "governing precepts that were embedded in Islam by the Prophet Muhammad and his earliest followers" (which together with two succeeding generations of Muslims are known as the Salaf), from which IS insists it "cannot waver".

Virtually every major decision and law promulgated by the Islamic State adheres to what it calls, in its press and pronouncements, and on its billboards, license plates, stationery, and coins, "the Prophetic methodology," which means following the prophecy and example of Muhammad, in punctilious detail.

While other jihadis are salafist in doctrine, IS been more exacting in following early practices by "embracing slavery and crucifixion without apology," as well as a Jizya tax on Christians. It has boasted about its enslavement of Yazidi women in its international magazine Dabiq.

=== Of Jihadi-Salafism ===
The ideology of the Islamic State is based on Jihadi-Salafism, "a distinct ideological movement in Sunni Islam", according to Cole Bunzel of the Brookings Institution and Graeme Wood of The Atlantic. According to their works, and IS itself, it unites two streams of Islamic thought that are the original Muslim Brotherhood and Salafism, though IS regards the modern Muslim Brotherhood and Hamas as traitors and apostates. "We believe that Jihad in God's path is an individual obligation, from the fall of al-Andalus until the liberation of [all] muslim lands, and [that it is an individual obligation] in the presence of a pious person or an impious person." British newspaper The Guardian defines the organisation's ideology as "generally viewed as identical to al-Qaʿida's or the Saudi version of Salafism– adherence to fundamental Islamic tenets." However, the sheer brutality and extreme tendencies of IS have alienated them from mainstream Salafi-Jihadists. Prominent salafi-jihadist ideologues have condemned IS and wrote treatises against them.

One of the most repeated propaganda tropes of IS is the denunciation of its jihadist and other religious opponents as Murjiʾa, an ancient heterodox sect condemned as heretical by mainstream Sunnism. According to Jeffrey Bristol,

"This is an important accusation, for ISIS believes that true Islam is one wholly without sects, even without the traditional four schools of jurisprudence, so that any creation of sectarianism renders one's Islam void."

=== Takfir ===
The Takfiri ideology of groups like Al-Qaʿida and Islamic State has its roots in the writings of the 20th century Egyptian militant Islamist ideologue Sayyid Qutb (1906-1966 C.E), preached against the governments and, in some respects, the societies of the muslim world.

Qutb regarded the muslim world as being sunk in a state of Jahiliyya (pre-Islamic ignorance) and by employing Takfir (excommunication); he demanded violent overthrowal of contemporary regimes. Describing the contemporary conditions of society, Qutb claimed:

"Our whole environment, people's beliefs and ideas, habits and art, rules and laws - is Jahiliyya, even to the extent that what we consider to be Islamic culture, Islamic sources, Islamic philosophy and Islamic thought are also constructs of Jahiliyya!"

IS' sectarianism and takfiri approach is historically rooted in Al-Qaʿida in Iraq (AQI), founded by Abu Mus‘ab az-Zarqawi in 2004. Its ideological roots are found in the writings of Ibn Taymiyya, Muhammad Ibn ‘Abd al-Wahhab and Sayyid Qutb. The Takfir (declaring self-proclaimed Muslims to be apostates, which usually also means calling for their death) of IS on large numbers of Muslims has been a point of difference between itself and other Jihadis such as Al-Qaʿida. IS is "committed to purifying the world by killing vast numbers of people", according to Graeme Wood. According to Jamileh Kadivar, IS has given a higher priority to fighting what it views as Murtaddin "apostates" than Kuffar asli "original disbelievers" (Jews, Christians, Hindus, etc.). Consequently, the majority of the "27,947 terrorist deaths" it has been responsible for as of 2020 (Note: directly or through affiliated groups, from its inception in 2014 to 2020) have been Muslims (Note: according to Jamileh Kadivar based on estimates from Global Terrorism Database, 2020; Herrera, 2019; Human Rights Office of the High Commissioner for Human Rights & United Nations Assistance Mission for Iraq (UNAMI) Human Rights Office, 2014; Ibrahim, 2017; Obeidallah, 2014; 2015) it regards as "Kafir". On the other hand, Troy E. Spier notes that the demarcation of believers and non-believers is more complex than a simple assignation of religious faith. Takfiri ideology is "a significant part" of IS "identity and being" (according to Kadivar), and a message emphasizing the pure Islam of IS supporters and the "otherness", unbelief and apostasy of "other Muslims" permeates its media/propaganda. (Note: "Daesh's official media" includes, "al-Hayat Media Center (including videos, Dabiq, and Rumiyah magazines), Al-Furqan, Ajnad, Al-Himmah publications, Al-Naba newsletter, Al-Bayan Radio, and Wilayat media offices".)

From about 2003 to 2006, Abu Musʿab az-Zarqawi, the head of IS predecessor group, al‑Qaʿida in Iraq, expanded "the range of behavior" that could make large number of self-proclaimed Muslims infidels (Kuffar) – including "in certain cases, selling alcohol or drugs, wearing Western clothes or shaving one's beard, voting in an election – even for a Muslim candidate – and being lax about calling other people apostates". In its official creedal statements, however, IS explicitly denies pronouncing Takfīr against Muslims who commit major sins (Kabāʾir), such as selling or drinking alcohol and theft, provided they do not declare such acts permissible (Istiḥlāl). Meanwhile, Shiʿa Muslim branches such as the Imamites (Twelvers) have been its "main target" in takfīr, as the group accuses them of being Rafiḍa and Ghulat. Az-Zarqawi wrote that "the danger from the Shiʿa ... is greater, and their damage is worse and more destructive to the [islamic] nation (Umma) than the Americans, ... so fighting the Shiites ... will not end until the land is ... purified of them".

IS continued the policy of Takfir, on the vast majority of modern-day Shiʿa groups, Baṭini sects, certain Sufi branches and others. "Those who reject the Takfir of Twelver Shiite scholars" are "disbelievers". The group states that if a Muslim who commits one of the "10 nullifiers (Nawaqiḍ) of Islam" established by Muhammad Ibn ʿAbd al-Wahhab, they become an apostate from Islam. The "third nullifier" was that: "Whoever does not hold the polytheists (Mushrikin) to be disbelievers (Kuffar), or has doubts about their disbelief or considers their ways and beliefs to be correct, has committed disbelief" An "Important memorandum" by the group from 2017 stated:

The Islamic State has not ceased for a single day from making Takfir of the Mushrikin [polytheists], and that it treats the making of the Takfir of the Mushrikin as one of the utmost principles of the religion, which must be known before knowing the prayer and other obligations that are known of the religion by necessity

However, the IS definition of Mushrikin was not limited to those who had multiple gods in their religion. IS included amongst the sins qualifying as one of the nullifiers "adopting democracy or fighting for the sake of patriotism, nationalism or civil state". In IS jurisprudence, however, fighting out of nationalist or patriotic motives does not in itself render an individual an apostate (Murtadd); rather, it constitutes apostasy when aimed at establishing non-sharīʿa governmental or administrative structures (such as a democratic or "civil state") or when actively fighting to resist the implementation of the Sharīʿa. Another example of the willingness to Takfir is a statement not only calling for the revival of slavery (specifically of (Yazidis) but takfiring any Muslim who disagreed with that doctrine.

Yazidi women and children [are to be] divided according to the Shariah amongst the fighters of the Islamic State who participated in the Sinjar operations … Enslaving the families of the kuffar and taking their women as concubines is a firmly established aspect of the Shariah that if one were to deny or mock, he would be denying or mocking the verses of the Koran and the narrations of the Prophet … and thereby apostatizing from Islam.

Despite their similarities in ideology, IS also takfired other islamist and jihadi groups – the Muslim Brotherhood (Al-Ikhwan ul-Muslimin), Al-Nusra Front and Al-Qaʿida. The Muslim Brotherhood in particular has been dubbed a "devastating cancer", "the brothers of Shayṭan, a deviant sect, and the laboring agents of the Crusaders against Islam and its people". It claims that "To actualize the 'New World Order' project, the Crusaders (Christians) found none better than the Murtadd Brotherhood to be the role model for people".

According to Jamileh Kadivar, an examination of IS public statements reveals conflict within the group over takfir – over whether takfir is "one of the principles of the religion," or merely a "requirement/necessity of religion", which has led to "warnings, imprisonment, and execution" of "Sharia office members, judges, and amirs"

=== Importance of violence ===
IS has been noted for what many observers have called "appalling" or "horrifying" brutality, its release of videos and photographs of beheadings, shootings, caged prisoners being burnt alive or submerged gradually until drowned. Among other effects, the group's mass killings and publicizing of them led to a split between it and Al-Qaʿida.

IS' violence is "not some whimsical, crazed fanaticism, but a very deliberate, considered strategy", according to some analysts, who often quote from the tract Management of Savagery This work asserts that "one who previously engaged in Jihad knows that it is naught but violence, crudeness, terrorism, deterrence and massacring." While "savage chaos" is unpleasant it has to be remembered that even "the most abominable of the levels of savagery" are better "than stability under the order of unbelief," i.e. any regime other than IS.

One observer has described IS' publicizing of its mass executions and killing of civilians as part of "a conscious plan designed to instill among believers a sense of meaning that is sacred and sublime, while scaring the hell out of fence-sitters and enemies." Another describes its purpose as to "break" psychologically those under its control "so as to ensure their absolute allegiance through fear and intimidation", while generating "outright hate and vengeance" by its enemies. (That this doctrine has been embraced by at least some lower level IS fighters would seem to be corroborated by German journalist Jürgen Todenhöfer, an opponent of Western intervention in Iraq who spent ten days embedded with IS in Mosul, and noted "something that I don't understand at all is the enthusiasm in their plan of religious cleansing, planning to kill the non-believers ... They were talking about hundreds of millions. They were enthusiastic about it ...")

=== Eschatology ===
One difference between IS and other Islamist and jihadist movements, including al-Qaʿida, is the group's emphasis on eschatology and apocalypticism—that is, a belief that the final Day of Judgment by God are near, and specifically, that the arrival of one known as the Mahdi is close at hand. It has been described as "a major part" of IS' "recruiting pitch." The IS-Caliph, Abu Bakr al-Baghdadi and other leaders have depicted themselves as battling the "Antichrist" (Al-Masiḥ ad-Dajjal) according to Fawaz A. Gerges.

IS believes that it will defeat the army of "Rome" at the town of Dabiq, in fulfilment of prophecy. Following its interpretation of the Hadith of the Twelve Successors, IS also believes that after al-Baghdadi there will be only four more legitimate Caliphs. The noted scholar of militant Islamism William McCants writes:

References to the End Times fill Islamic State propaganda. It is a big selling point with foreign fighters, who want to travel to the lands where the final battles of the apocalypse will take place. The civil wars raging in those countries today [Iraq and Syria] lend credibility to the prophecies. The Islamic State has stoked the apocalyptic fire. [...] For Bin Laden's generation, the apocalypse wasn't a great recruiting pitch. Governments in the Middle East two decades ago were more stable, and sectarianism was more subdued. It was better to recruit by calling to arms against corruption and tyranny than against the Antichrist. Today, though, the apocalyptic recruiting pitch makes more sense.

— William McCants, The ISIS Apocalypse: The History, Strategy, and Doomsday Vision of the Islamic State

=== Differences with Al-Qaeda ===
The roots of the doctrinal divergences between Al-Qaʿida and IS lie in the various theological and policy disagreements between Osama Bin Laden and Abu Musʿab az-Zarqawi; the Jordanian leader of Al-Qaʿida's Iraq franchise (AQI). Usama Bin Ladin believed in Muslim unity (i.e. sectarianism was discouraged) and aimed the war of "vexing and exhausting" at the "far enemy" (United States). On the other hand, Zarqawi pivoted towards eliminating internal enemies, most notably Shiʿa groups and Secularists, whom he regarded as the "near enemy". IS focuses on "grievance (heavily grounded in the feelings of a displaced and impoverished rural class)" which involve a "near enemy". In the wake of the fall of Saddam Hussein, not only were Sunnis removed from power but the capital Baghdad and the Iraqi army were cleansed of Sunnis. This created a "sense of Sunni loss of privilege" and power; "a deep desire for revenge against "usurpers" specifically the "cosmopolitan, affluent elite" and "above all" the "Rafiḍa" and the Iranian Regime.

Al-Qaʿida's leadership criticised both Zarqawi and his successor Abu ʿUmar al-Baghdadi over their anti-shia outlook. Bin Ladin had advocated for a joint front of Shia and Sunni islamist groups to fight together during the Iraqi insurgency against the American occupation of Iraq. However, Zarqawi believed in igniting a sectarian war in Iraq as part of the anti-american insurgency; which eventually culminated in the Iraqi civil war. IS ideologues had adopted wahhabist beliefs that Islam should be "cleansed" or purged of deviant groups that "defiled" the religion, and amplified them in their global jihadist strategy. Al-Qaʿida ideologues also regularly criticise IS for exaggerating the status of the medieval scholar Ibn Taymiyya in their doctrinal and legal manuals; accusing them of disregarding the wider classical Sunni scholarship. Urging Zarqawi to refrain from harming Shia civilians and mosques; Ayman az-Zawahiri wrote:

"such acts affect the protected blood of women, children, and non-combatant Shia public, who are protected because they are excused for their ignorance [of true religious doctrine, unlike Shia clerics]. This is the consensus of the Sunni toward the Shia public and ignorant followers."

By February 2014, Al-Qaʿida had publicly severed its ties to Islamic State and condemned its brutal violence; accusing the organisation of estranging the muslim public from the Jihadist cause. Former British Intelligence officer and diplomat Alastair Crooke sees "two elements" to the difference between IS and Al-Qaʿida:

1. IS believes that original historic Islamic state was formed by "fighting-scholars" and their armed followers. Although it adopted Wahhabi doctrines, IS radically departs from Wahhabi tradition by denying the home of that sect (Saudi Arabia) "any legitimacy as founders of a State, as the head of the Mosque, or as interpreter of the Qurʾan." Instead, IS asserts these attributes for itself and views itself as the sole legitimate State.
2. IS bases its tactics from the book The Management of Savagery which advocates for "No Mercy" with no room for "softness"; since softness is the "ingredient for failure." It promotes a very narrow definition of apostasy. The beheadings and other violent enactments of IS form part of a deliberate strategy to inflict fear and psychologically intimidate its opponents.

Numerous Al-Qaʿida leaders and ideologues penned key treatises contesting the legitimacy of Caliphate claims of the Islamic State, citing precedence from classical, modern and pre-modern islamic jurisprudents such as Ibn Taymiyya, Al-Mawardi, Ibn Khaldun, Muhammad Ibn ʿAbd al-Wahhab, Rashid Rida, etc. In a 10-page tract titled "Taqrib Mafhum al-Khilafat ar-Rashida" (Familiarising the muslim masses with the concept of the Rightly Guided Caliphate), Al-Nusra Front scholar Sami al-ʿUraydi asserts that people cannot be forced to pledge Bayʿa (allegiance) to the Caliphate; rather it needs to be established through Shura (consultation) with the qualified representatives of the Muslim populations. Although a Caliphate can be established forcibly in a lexical sense, the regime of IS cannot be termed "Rightly Guided Caliphate" since it was violently created by forcibly oppressing the muslim population and is led by "Khawarij". Citing Rashid Rida, Al-ʿUraydi writes:

"Sheikh Muhammad Rashid Rida, (may God have mercy on him) says: 'The meaning of this is that; seizing power by force is like eating dead meat and pork in necessity to avoid starvation, is enforced by force and is less [disastrous] than anarchy... and its implication is that it is necessary to strive to always remove it when possible, and it is not permissible to settle on its permanence' "

=== Women and sex roles ===
IS publishes material directed at women. Although women are usually not allowed to take up arms, media groups encourage them to play supportive roles within IS, such as providing first aid, cooking, nursing and sewing skills, in order to become "good wives of Jihad".

A document entitled Women in the Islamic State: Manifesto and Case Study, released 23 January 2015 by the media wing of IS's all-female Al-Khansaa Brigade (issued in Arabic and not translated by IS but by the anti-islamist Quilliam Foundation), emphasized the paramount importance of marriage and motherhood for women and states that under certain conditions, "it is considered legitimate for a girl to be married at the age of nine," – while – "most pure girls will be married by sixteen or seventeen". Women should live a life of "sedentariness", fulfilling their "divine duty of motherhood" at home: "Yes, we say 'stay in your houses,' ....." Under "exceptional circumstances," women may leave home – doctors, teachers, and women studying Islam are exempt from confinement, as are women if they are needed to fight Jihad and ordered to do so by religious leaders when there are not enough men around to protect the country from enemy attack.

In education, the document author envisions a system where girls complete their formal schooling by age 15. Women are encouraged to study, provided the content is not "worldly" knowledge, but religious, for example Shariʿa (islamic law). The proper Muslim women should not study

these worthless worldly sciences in the farthest mountains and the deepest valleys, ... She travels, intent upon learning Western lifestyle and sitting in the midst of another culture, to study the brain cells of crows, grains of sand and the arteries of fish!

If instead she studies Fiqh (islamic jurisprudence), "there is with no need for her to flit here and there to get degrees and so on, just so she can try to prove that her intelligence is greater than a man's."

The treatise decries Western Feminism and the blurring of lines between the roles of each sex, which has caused Muslims to forget how to worship God properly. "Women are not presented with a true picture of man", and men have become emasculated.

Concepts of identical rights, obligations, and social roles among human beings and also between men and women are criticized on the grounds that

Women gain nothing from the idea of their equality with men apart from thorns ... Under 'equality' they have to work and rest on the same days as men even though they have 'monthly complications' and pregnancies and so on, in spite of the nature of her life and responsibilities to their husband, sons and religion."

Despite IS' rejection of identical rights and roles for all mankind, human worth itself is considered within its worldview to be unaffected by these differences.

Residents report that the ISIL dress code for women was both very strict and strictly enforced. Shortly after taking control of Mosul in 2014, residents reported that ISIL distributed from door-to-door a "Bill of the City," detailing its plans for governing the city, and declaring that women should wear a "wide, loose Jilbab, stay in your homes and leave them only in cases of necessity."

The dress code was implemented gradually and completed with the requirement that every part of the female body, including the eyes be covered in public. Some former female residents complained that this prevented them from performing basic tasks such as seeing where they were going; or when shopping seeing what they were buying and what change was being given them.

Thousands of sets of Niqab were distributed to shops in Mosul after the ISIL takeover, and decrees ordered that women wear them along with gloves. ISIL billboards gave details of required apparel for women, stating that outer gowns should be "opaque and not reveal what is beneath" and should "not draw attention." Regulations on dress are enforced by Diwan al-Hisba or "morality police" who issue citations and confiscate IDs. According to The New York Times, "depending on the offense, he was forced to pay a fine, or else either he or his wife was sentenced to a whipping, recent escapees said." In one case, a woman resident complained that she was arrested by a vigilant morality police officer who spotted her lifting her veil to let food enter her mouth while on a family picnic. She was sentenced to 21 lashes administered with "a cable that had metal spikes on the end" and had to be hospitalized afterwards.

The Diwan al-Hisba also enforced laws on behavior for men in Mosul, who were fined and flogged for infractions such as "incorrect beard length, for failure to pray at the sanctioned time, for possession of cigarettes and alcohol".

== Descriptions ==
=== Sunni militant ===
USA Today writes that "The Islamic State is a group of Sunni militants" that "believes in the strict enforcement of Sharia law." In a conversation with Thomas L. Friedman, Mohammad bin Salman Al Saud described IS's message to Saudi and other Arab Muslims as: "The West is trying to enforce its agenda on you — and the Saudi government is helping them — and Iran is trying to colonize the Arab world. So we — ISIS — are defending Islam."

=== Qutbi ===
The Islamic State adheres to global jihadist principles and follows the ideology of al-Qaʿida and many other modern-day jihadist groups. Egyptian scholar Sayyid Qutb is considered the "Father of the Jihadi-Salafi" movement. Major elements of IS ideology are thought to be derived from the Jihadist works of the Qutb and the manuals of the hard-line wings of the Muslim Brotherhood movement, thus followers of the Salafi-Jihadi school are often derogatorily labelled as "Qutbi"..

The central role of Qutbist influence on Daesh is best captured in a saying among Islamic State supporters, attributed to Yemeni journalist Abdulelah Haider Shaye:

"The Islamic State was drafted by Sayyid Qutb, taught by Abdullah Azzam, globalized by Osama bin Laden, transferred to reality by Abu Musab al-Zarqawi, and implemented by al-Baghdadis: Abu Omar and Abu Bakr."

=== Wahhabi ===
Other sources trace the group's roots to Wahhabism. The New York Times wrote:

For their guiding principles, the leaders of the Islamic State ... are open and clear about their almost exclusive commitment to the Wahhabi movement of Sunni Islam. The group circulates images of Wahhabi religious textbooks from Saudi Arabia in the schools it controls. Videos from the group's territory have shown Wahhabi texts plastered on the sides of an official missionary van.

In a seven-page memorandum (titled "That Those Who Perish Would Perish upon Proof"), the Delegated Committee of Islamic stated that while the First Saudi State was established to wage war against the shirk (polytheism) of grave-worship for over 70 years, the IS was established "to wage war against the shirk of the constitution, representing the global system, and it was thus fought by nations in the East and the West." Quoting Ibn Taymiyya, the memorandum declares:

"Of the greatest blessings upon one for whom Allah wants wellness is that He brought him to live in this time, during which Allah is renewing the religion and reviving the slogan of the Muslims and the conditions of the believers and the mujahidin, so that they may be similar to those who preceded them of the Muhajirin and Ansar..."

The Islamic State aims to return to the early days of Islam, rejecting all innovations in the religion, which it believes corrupts its original spirit. It condemns later caliphates and the Ottoman Empire for deviating from what it calls pure Islam. Following Salafi-Jihadi tradition, the Islamic State condemns the followers of secular law as disbelievers, putting the current Saudi government in that category.

According to The Economist, Saudi Wahhabi practices followed by the group include the establishment of religious police to root out "vice" and enforce attendance at Ṣalat prayers, the widespread use of capital punishment, and the destruction or re-purposing of any non-Sunni religious buildings. Bernard Haykel has described al-Baghdadi's creed as "a kind of untamed Wahhabism". Alastair Crooke described the Islamic State as adopting Wahhabi "puritanism," but denying the "Saudi Kingdom any legitimacy as founders of a State, as the head of the Mosque, or as interpreter of the Qur'an. The IS claims all these attributes for itself."

In contrast to the centrality of Caliphate in the discourse and propaganda of the Islamic State, traditional Wahhabi scholars were not known to have called for the re-establishment of a pan-Islamic caliphate. Their doctrines on the Islamic state and just leadership were a reiteration of classical Sunni beliefs and did not amount to a novel political theology. The 18th-century reformer Muhammad ibn Abd al-Wahhab was mainly concerned with implementing religious reforms and purification of faith rather than incorporating the Muslim Umma into a unified political entity headed by a Khalifa. This trend had continued in the Wahhabi treatises of the early twentieth century which didn't call for the re-establishment of a caliphate to fill the power vacuum left after the dissolution of the Ottoman Empire. After their conquest of Mecca, the Wahhabis had not declared it the centre of a new Islamic caliphate.

=== Radical Islamist ===
The BBC defines the group's ideology as "radical Islamist," which "aims to establish a "caliphate", a state ruled by a single political and religious leader according to Islamic law, or Sharia." Furthermore, the BBC adds that "IS members are jihadists who adhere to an extreme interpretation of Sunni Islam and consider themselves the only true believers. They hold that the rest of the world is made up of unbelievers who seek to destroy Islam, justifying attacks against other Muslims and non-Muslims alike."

=== Jihadi-Salafist ===
Cole Bunzel of the Brookings Institution and Graeme Wood of The Atlantic state that the ideology of the Islamic State is based on Jihadi-Salafism, "a distinct ideological movement in Sunni Islam". According to their works, and IS itself, it unites two streams of Islamic thought that are the original Muslim Brotherhood and Salafism."

However, major figures of the Salafi-Jihadist movement have disassociated themselves from IS. The systematic policy of murder, brutality, excommunication (takfir) and anathemization was extreme even for mainstream Salafi-Jihadists. Salafi-Jihadist leader Abu Abdillah Muhammad al-Mansur, a teacher of al-Baghdadi, wrote a treatise refuting IS titled "The Islamic State between Reality and Illusion," wherein he condemned his former student as a deviant and an ignorant person who "did not master one single book in theology or jurisprudence".

=== Global Jihadist ===
Australian National Security informs that "The Islamic State is an Iraq and Syria-based Sunni extremist group and former al‑Qaʿida affiliate that adheres to the global jihadist ideology."

=== Khawarij ===
Sunni critics, including Salafi and jihadist Muftis such as Adnan al-Aroor and Abu Basir al-Tartusi, say that IS and related terrorist groups are not Sunnis, but modern-day Khawarij—Muslims who have stepped outside the mainstream of Islam—serving an imperial anti-Islamic agenda.

=== Islamist-fascist ===
Some journalists, historians, writers and opponents of IS and totalitarian Islamism in Arabic countries have called IS and its self-proclaimed Caliphate's strictly ruled regime "Islamofascism" (other terms which have also been used are "Islamic fascism" and "Islamist fascism").

Similarities exist between the IS militias and fascist regimes, namely their structures, their romanticized images of death, their longing for a violent struggle, their glorification of war and sacrifice, their imperialistic goals, their machismo, their brutal war crimes and the methods of torture which they used against their opponents, their hatred of pacifism, and propaganda which mixes messages about "spirituality" with militant ideals about "forging a new man" through "warfare, action and religious discipline", etc., with the ideals and mentality of "ur-fascist" regimes, and the ideals and mentality of Clerical fascist movements and regimes, for example, WWII. For example, the fanatically extremist Orthodox Christian Romanian fascist Iron Guard movement and the Hungarian extremist Catholic fascist Arrow Cross movement both spread similar messages in order to unite the members of their death squads and paramilitary organizations, boost their morale and school them in ideals about becoming "higher" men through hardness, war, fanatic religious worship, and motivate them to commit acts of intolerance and brutality against members of other races and anyone else who opposed their ideas. Their methods of "punishing" non-believers, as well as political and religious opponents, have also been compared. For example, the Iron Guard hanged Jews on meat-hooks in slaughterhouses during pogroms in Bucharest during the 1940s, and it slaughtered them according to kosher methods and wrote the word "kosher" on their corpses, including the corpses of schoolchildren, in order to desecrate the victims and their religion. During its strict rule of Raqqa, IS published execution videos in which it murdered people on meat-hooks in a Syrian slaughterhouse according to Halal slaughter methods, during the Islamic holiday of ‘Eid al-Adha. Forced participation in religious ceremonies was another indoctrination tool which was used by all of the Clerical fascist puppet-states and IS because they believed that forced participation in religious ceremonies was "necessary" in order to "teach the people" through force.

The modern IS regime and the old Fascist movements openly advocated genocide, and they also committed genocide against minorities and murdered anyone else who did not conform to their worldviews, such as "traitors" to their faiths or countries, members of different ethnic groups, people who practiced different religions, atheists, members of progressive or secular groups (for example, Jewish people, socialists and Slavs in Nazi-occupied Europe and Kurds, Yazidis and members of non-religious Syrian groups in IS-occupied zones), people who their ideologies considered "weak", "decadent", "pacifist", etc. (see the Fascist & Nazi ideas of "purity", supermen and subhumans).

In classical Italian Fascism, and the so-called "ur-fascist" weltanschauung, the belief in performing actions for the sake of actions, the idea that war was a "natural place for the worthy man" and the belief that conservative and extreme traditionalist values should be defended were all important parts of the movement's ideology and "culture of violence"; the same contempt for "weakness", and the glorification/romanticism of engaging in "actions that speak louder than words" (i.e. terrorism and violence) and the belief that going to war is something which "the new man" should "naturally want to do" is just as central and important to IS's ideology, propaganda and recruiting tactics as it was to the European Fascists. Fascism and IS's variant of Islamism are ultra traditionalist and they also have goals and dreams of waging war in order to conquer territory and form an "empire". Fascists want to reconquer territory and restore the glory of the Roman Empire, while IS wants to conquer territory and create its own version of a Caliphate. This view, which is based on machismo, the desire to rule over conquered lands and cities and impose a harsh regime on others with the right of might, is central to both movements' ideologies.

The IS ideology has many similarities to Italian futurism.

=== Comparisons to Revolutionary Marxism ===
Some authors have conceptualized similarities between the ideological aspects espoused by IS and the militant revolutionary strands of Marxist doctrine. Major themes espoused by IS have been compared to various aspects of Marxist worldview such as opposition to the nation-state system, binary categorisations of human societies into oppressed and oppressor classes, advocacy of global revolution to overthrow the prevalent world system, belief in an ideologically dedicated vanguard to carry out the armed revolution, deterministic conceptualisation of history, negation of diplomatic engagement with opponents and emphasis on violent means to change the hostile world order rather than participating in internal reforms. According to political scientist Massimo Ramaioli:

"Al-Baghdadi was not unlike Lenin: leaders of an uncompromising vanguard, hellbent on the rejection of the incumbent historical bloc, ready to deploy violence to upend such order, zealots in their representation of the Enemy. The scientific truth adumbrated by an averred correct understanding of history granted both ISIS and the Bolsheviks brazen confidence and frightful resolve. It revealed in their ideology and attendant political praxis."

== Reception ==
Following the announcement of the Islamic State of Iraq (ISIL's predecessor) in 2006, there was much celebration on Jihadist websites. A number of popular forums added counters that counted the number of days that had passed since the Islamic State's establishment, with a statement underneath: "[a certain number of] days have passed since the announcement of the Islamic State and the [Muslim] community's coming hope…and it will continue to persist by the will of God." However, outside of jihadists online, it was not considered by people as an official state. Abu Umar al-Baghdadi and Abu Hamza al-Muhajir both insisted that the Islamic State of Iraq was not simply a new name for Al-Qaeda in Iraq, but was an actual state. When other Iraq-based Salafi factions like the Islamic Army in Iraq refused to recognize it as a state and give it their allegiance, Abu Umar al-Baghdadi called them "sinners".

== Criticism ==
U.S. Secretary of State John Kerry said in a statement that "[IS] is not Islamic", and denied it was a state, instead calling it a terrorist organization. Neither governments nor peoples recognize it as a legitimate government.

== See also ==
- Hazimism, an offshoot from mainstream ISIS ideology
