= Hazimism =

Salafi-Jihadist trend supporting the doctrine of 'Takfir al-'adhir'

Hazimism, also referred to as the Hazimi movement or known as the Hazimiyyah or Hazimi current, is a movement within the ideology of the Islamic State. The movement was derived from the doctrines of the Saudi-born Muslim scholar Ahmad ibn Umar al-Hazimi, which was adopted by many Tunisian recruits within ISIS.

Hazimis believe that those who do not unconditionally excommunicate (takfir) unbelievers are themselves unbelievers, which opponents argue leads to an unending chain of takfir. Its spread within ISIS triggered prolonged ideological conflict within the group, pitting its followers against the moderate faction led by Turki al-Binali. It has been described as "ultra-extreme" and "even more extreme than ISIS". The movement was eventually branded as extremist by ISIS, who initiated a crackdown on its followers.

Due to al-Hazimi's reluctance to directly comment on the subject of politics, there exist varying beliefs among the Hazimi movement, leading some to argue that it does not present itself as a unique manhaj. Hazimis spans from direct Salafi-jihadist elements currently aligned with Boko Haram and formerly associated with ISIS, to those hesitating to explicitly criticise the Saudi monarchy. Hazimis regard participation in the democratic system or process as grounds for takfir and a nullifier of Islam, considering it equivalent to prostration to an idol.

== Beliefs ==
Contemporary Salafi-Jihadi movements base their beliefs on the teachings of theologian Muhammad ibn Abd al-Wahhab. However, al-Hazimi asserted that the doctrines put forward by contemporary Salafi-jihadi thinkers were not to be blindly followed, challenging the consensual authority of Ibn Taymiyyah. This outlook would completely shake the ideological foundations of the Salafi-jihadi movement. Hazimi's doctrines were also highly influenced by the doctrines of the Egyptian militant Islamist ideologue Sayyid Qutb.

Central to Hazimism is the doctrine of takfir al-'adhir ("excommunication of the excuser"). In his treatise Nullifiers of Islam, Muhammad ibn Abd al-Wahhab writes that those who do not excommunicate (takfir) unbelievers are themselves, unbelievers, whether that is because they doubt their disbelief (kufr) or otherwise. Hazimism differs from mainline Wahabbism by rejecting the concept of al-'udhr bi'l-jahl ("excusing on the basis of ignorance"), which asserts that those who doubt the disbelief of a disbeliever due to their own ignorance are not always disbelievers. This concept is considered by jihadis to be a restraint on excessive takfir.

To justify their claims, various Hazimi ideologues assert that Ibn Taymiyyah was against the principle of al-'udhr bi'l-jahl in affairs of shirk (polytheism). Al-Hazimi categorically rejects al-'udhr bi'l-jahl for actions he considers to be of "greater polytheism" (al-shirk al-akbar) and "greater disbelief" (al-kufr al-akbar), such as voting in elections and supplicating to the dead. Al-Hazimi states that those who refuse to pronounce takfir on the performers of such actions on the basis of al-'udhr bi'l-jahl are themselves unbelievers.

== History ==
=== Al-Hazimi in Tunisia ===
Between December 2011 and May 2012, al-Hazimi delivered four lectures in Tunisia. He was supported by the Islamic Good Society and Hay al-Khadra' Mosques Committee. While the members of the former were arrested for financing terrorism, the latter had maintained links to Ansar al-Sharia in Tunisia (AST). With the aid of the committee, al-Hazimi founded the Ibn Abi Zayd al-Qayrawani Institute for Sharia Sciences, which promoted his teachings. His views were also amplified through AST's Facebook page.

=== Hazimism in ISIS ===
In the following years, several Tunisians who adopted al-Hazimi's views joined ISIS. During the group's conflict with the al-Nusra Front, the Tunisians remained loyal and were rewarded with senior administrative and religious posts. With increasing influence, however, their belief in takfir al-'adhir (excommunication of the excuser) became a source of concern for ISIS leadership. Bahraini scholar Turki al-Binali, who led the group's Office of Research and Studies, prepared a series of lectures and pamphlets against the doctrine. He argued that while al-'udhr bi'l-jahl was invalid in instances of greater polytheism and disbelief, this does not necessarily mean that those who make excuses are disbelievers. In a tweet, he also described the belief as bidʻah (religious innovation). The Binalis, as they were later termed, also claimed the Hazimi view led to an "infinite regress of takfir" (al-takfir bi'l-tasalsul).

In March 2014, audio leaked of several high-level Hazimi officials, including the wāli of Hasakah, pronouncing takfir on the Taliban and Osama bin Laden. A separate leak showed takfir being made on Al-Qaeda in the Islamic Maghreb. In late 2014, 50 Hazimis fled to Turkey while 70 were imprisoned and executed by ISIS after they made takfir on elements of its leadership which did not consider Ayman al-Zawahiri to be a disbeliever. Following their arrest, a pro-Hazimi statement surfaced describing ISIS as a state of disbelievers and Jahmites. Several Hazimi cells were formed afterwards; the breakup of one in Raqqa being featured in Dabiq where they were branded as Kharijites. Despite the crackdown, several groups of Hazimis remained, including one led by a certain Abu Ayyub al-Tunisi and supported by the wāli (governor) of Aleppo. In 2016, Hazimis fought against ISIS in the vicinity of Al-Bab and Jarabulus. Abu Muath al-Jazairi, a senior Hazimi, called ISIS the "Idols' State" and Abu Bakr al-Baghdadi the "taghut" of Syria in his account of the incident.

In a statement published in Al-Naba in April 2017, ISIS' Central Office for Overseeing the Sharia Departments banned the discussion of al-'udhr bi'l-jahl and takfir al-'adhir, but warned that hesitation in takfir was inexcusable. On 17 May 2017, ISIS' Delegated Committee issued a memorandum which condemned al-takfir bi'l-tasalsul but stated that takfir was from the "foundations of the religion", rebuking those who hesitate in making it and branding them as Murji'ites. Shortly afterwards, al-Binali published a response to the memorandum and claimed its intent was to placate the Hazimis. On May 31, al-Binali was killed in a CJTF–OIR airstrike, followed by two other scholars who supported him. The timing was seen as suspicious by the Binalis, who accused the Delegated Committee of leaking their locations. In September 2017, Abu Bakr al-Baghdadi reportedly dismissed and detained several Hazimis, reshuffling the Delegated Committee.

In 2019, Hazimi foreign fighters, including a large contingent of Tunisians, failed a two-day coup attempt against al-Baghdadi. ISIS alleged they were led by Abu Muath al-Jazairi and placed a bounty on him.

=== Known Hazimis ===
Known Hazimis include Ahmad ibn Umar al-Hazimi, the founder of the movement, and his students:

1. Abu Ja'far al-Khattab, a Tunisian foreign fighter who was a member of the Majlis al-Shura of the so-called Islamic State and the Minister of Education.
2. Abu Mus'ab al-Tunisi, a "senior member" of the Islamic State and the Qadi of Deir ez-Zor.
3. Abu Khalid al-Sharqi, the Qadi of Raqqa Province.
4. Abu Muhammad al-Tunisi, the Qadi of Hasakah Province.
5. Abu Usama al-Iraqi, the Wali of Hasakah Province.
6. Abu Umar al-Kuwaiti, a member of the Shura Council who was executed on the orders of Abu Bakr al-Baghdadi.

Many other Hazimis were affluent in the media departments of the so-called Islamic State, such as Abu Muhammad al-Furqan, who operated Al-Hayat Media Center and Amaq News Agency. Shaykh Abu Sulayman ash-Shami, an American born FBI most wanted terrorist, was another Hazimi cleric within the so-called Islamic State's ranks.

=== Post-ISIS ===
In 2017, it was estimated there were about a hundred Hazimis in the Netherlands. Currently, the only major jihadist group that practices Hazimism is Boko Haram.

== See also ==
- Haddadism
- Turki al-Binali
