= Ahmad ibn Umar al-Hazimi =

Saudi Salafi Muslim scholar and theologian

- أحمد بن عمر الحازمي

Personal life
- Born: Mecca, Saudi Arabia
- Education: Umm al-Qura University (BA)
- Known for: Takfir al-'Adhir

Religious life
- Religion: Islam
- Denomination: Sunni
- Jurisprudence: Hanbali
- Creed: Athari
- Movement: Hazimism

Muslim leader
- Influenced by: Ahmad ibn Hanbal, Ibn Taymiyya, Ibn al-Qayyim, Muhammad ibn Abd al-Wahhab, Muhammad ibn al-Uthaymeen

Ahmad ibn Umar al-Hazimi (Arabic: أحمد بن عمر الحازمي, romanized: Aḥmad ibn ʿUmar al-Ḥāzimī) is a Saudi scholar whose interpretation of takfir (excommunication) gave rise to the eponymous Hazimi. A relatively unknown figure until he publicised his teachings in Tunisia after the 2011 revolution, some followers of al-Hazimi's views briefly wielded considerable power within the Islamic State of Iraq and the Levant (ISIL). He was arrested and imprisoned by Saudi authorities in 2015 for unknown reasons.

== Life ==
Born in Mecca, al-Hazimi completed his bachelor's degree at Umm al-Qura University, majoring in the Quran and Sunnah. He also studied under Muslim scholars in the Great Mosque of Mecca, including in logic and Arabic grammar. He served as the imam of his local mosque in Mecca's Al-Zahir neighbourhood.

Over the course of four visits to Tunisia between December 2011 and May 2012, al-Hazimi delivered a series of lectures promoting takfir al-'adhir in association with local Islamist organisations linked with Ansar al-Sharia. With their aid, al-Hazimi established the Ibn Abi Zayd al-Qayrawani Institute for Sharia Sciences in the country, a religious institute that instructed in his views.

Several Tunisian adherents of al-Hazimi's positions later joined ISIL, disseminating the concept of takfir al-'adhir and becoming a potent ideological force within the group. In 2013, al-Hazimi uploaded several online lectures regarding takfir al-'adhir which were attacked by Turki al-Binali, a senior ISIL religious scholar who was the principal opponent of Hazimi influence on the organisation. In the following years, several Hazimis excommunicated ISIL' leadership and revolted against the group, who in turn labelled them as "extremists" and initiated a crackdown on the movement.

On 28 April 2015, al-Hazimi was arrested in Saudi Arabia and later imprisoned.

== Views ==
Muhammad ibn Abd al-Wahhab's "third nullifier of Islam" states that those who do not acknowledge the disbelief of a polytheist commit an act of apostasy. Al-Hazimi extends the nullifier to those who refrain from excommunicating those considered "ignorant", a doctrine known as takfir al-'adhir ("excommunication of the excuser"). Critics argue takfir al-'adhir leads to an indefinite chain of excommunication.

Al-Hazimi's affinity with Salafi jihadism has been debated by its supporters. Despite the adoption of takfir al-'adhir by elements of the movement, al-Hazimi has been described as "not himself a jihadi".

== See also ==
- Mahmud al-Haddad
- Turki al-Binali
