= Mohamed Haddad =

Mohamed Haddad may refer to:

- Mahmud al-Haddad, Egyptian scholar
- Mahmoud El-Haddad (born 1986), Egyptian weightlifter
- Mohamed Ryad Ben Haddad (born 1959), Algerian hurdler
- Mohamed Haddad (boxer) (born 1960), Syrian boxer
- Mohammed al-Haddad (1967–2025), Chief of the General Staff of the Libyan Army
- Mohammed Haddad (born 1975), Bahraini composer
- Mohammad Haddad (born 2006), Jordanian footballer
