= Ikhtilaf =

Scholarly disagreement in Islamic law

Ikhtilāf (Arabic: اختلاف, lit. 'disagreement, difference') is an Islamic scholarly religious disagreement, and is hence the opposite of ijma.

== Direction in Quran ==
According to Verse of Obedience, disagreements about any religious matter are to be arbitrated by referring to the Quran and Sunnah to dismiss ikhtilaf and to avoid taqlid. While those in authority are absent from arbitration in that verse, they are mentioned in verse 4:83, which includes the passage, "And whenever tidings come unto them, whether of security or fear, they spread it about, whereas had they referred it to the Messenger and to those in authority among them, those of them whose task it is to investigate would have known it." This argument has been attributed to Muhammad al-Baqir (d. c. 114/732), which also appears in al-Jami' li-ahkam al-Quran by the Sunni al-Qurtubi (d. 671/1272).

== Hadith ==
The hadith of Muhammad which states that "Allah will ensure my ummah will never collude en-masse upon error" have been mentioned in the books of Tirmidhi, Ibn Majah, Musnah Ahmad, and Darimi. This is often quoted as the primary proof of Ijma as well as rejection of ikhtilaf from the Hadith from the Sunni View.

Some Islamic scholars teach that when there is a scholarly disagreement on a certain issue, it is impermissible to condemn a person who follows a position that is different from one's own. The requirement to command the right and forbid the wrong does not apply when there is ikhtilaf upon a position.

However there is doubt as to the authenticity of this statement as to whether it truly came from Muhammad or not. People often quote this statement as a hadith, but it is not mentioned in the six authentic collections of hadith and its chain of narrators is also not known. There are various versions of this statement. In some versions it is rendered: "The difference of opinions among my Companions is a mercy for you"; alternately, it is rendered as: "The difference of opinions of my Companions is a mercy for my Ummah". Many scholars of hadith consider both of these versions as weak or da'if as far as their narration is concerned.

Muhammad used this supplication to ask Allah to guide him to the solution in disagreements:

It was narrated that ‘Aa’ishah the Mother of the Believers (may Allaah be pleased with her) said: When the Prophet (peace and blessings of Allaah be upon him) got up to pray at night, he would start his prayer with the words: “O Allaah, Lord of Jibra’eel, Mika’eel and Israfeel, Originator of the heavens and the earth, Knower of the unseen and the seen, You judge between Your slaves concerning that wherein they differ. Guide me concerning that wherein they differ of the truth by Your leave, for You guide whomsoever You will to a straight path.”

— Narrated by Muslim (770).

== Jurisprudence ==
The term ikhtilāf al-fuqahā or ikhtilāf al-fiqh, meaning "disagreement of the jurists", refers to the differences of opinions among early Islamic jurists and especially to the genre of works compiling and comparing conflicting opinions. Such compilations were usually organized topically and might contrast different schools of fiqh or differences within a given school. Ikhtilāf al-fuqahā is the title of a work by al-Ṭabarī.

== See also ==
- Ijma
- Adiaphora
- Bid‘ah
- Ghulat
- Uli al-amr
- Seventy-three Sects (Hadith)
- Salat al-Istikharah
- Maslaha
