= Abu Basir al-Tartusi =

Syrian Muslim cleric

Abu Basir al-Tartusi أبو بصير الطرطوسي
- Born: Abd-al Mun'em Mustafa Halima; Tartus, Syria

Abu Basir al-Tartusi is the assumed name of Abd-al Mun'em Mustafa Halima (Arabic: عبد المنعم مصطفى حليمة), a Syrian cleric and jihadist theoretician. He has been described as one of the "primary Salafi opinion-makers guiding the jihadi movement."

Abu Basir was born in the Syrian city of Tartus, but was forced to flee Syria during the 1979–82 Islamist uprising against Hafez al-Assad and emigrated to London.

Abu Basir leveled harsh criticism against the 7 July 2005 London bombings. Two days after the bombing he published a fatwa on his website that protested the killing of British civilians as a “disgraceful and shameful act, with no manhood, bravery, or morality. We cannot approve it nor accept it, and it is denied islamically and politically.” Abu Basir’s fatwa drew angry responses in Jihadi forums, which led him to publish another online declaration, “The Love of Revenge or the Legal Ruling,” on 11 July 2005.

On the other hand, he has condemned Sayyed Imam Al-Sharif's book Rationalizing Jihad in Egypt and the World which calls for a stop to jihad activities both in the West and in Muslim countries, as “numbness and discouragement” because it tells Muslims that they are too weak to engage in jihad or overthrow their oppressive rulers. He is quoted as saying “More than half of the Koran and hundreds of the Prophet’s sayings call for jihad and fighting those unjust tyrants,” Tartusi exclaimed on a jihadist Web site. “What do you want us to do with his huge quantity of Sharia provisions, and how do you want us to understand and interpret them? Where is the benefit in deserting jihad against those tyrants? Because of them, the nation lost its religion, glory, honor, dignity, land, resources, and every precious thing!”

In September 2005 the cleric as well as Saudi Arabia's senior cleric, Sheikh Abdulaziz al-Sheikh, criticized the tactic of sectarian war in Iraq as called for by Abu Musab al-Zarqawi.

A fatwa dated November 1, 2008 and signed by Abu Basir Al-Tartusi appeared on his website and declared Sheikh Yusuf al-Qaradawi to be an apostate. Al-Qaradhawi, who heads the International Union for Muslim Scholars and has a weekly programme called "Sharia and Life" on Al-Jazeera TV, has been called "one of the most prominent clerics in the Muslim world." Among Abu Basir Al-Tartusi's criticisms of Al-Qaradhawi was Al-Qaradhawi's attempts to save the Buddha statues in the Bamyan Valley in Afghanistan from being destroyed by the Taliban; a post-9/11 fatwa by Al-Qaradhawi stating there is nothing wrong with Muslims fighting in the United States Armed Forces against those thought to be responsible for terrorism; a statement allegedly "making light of Allah" in which Al-Qaradhawi criticized elections in some Arab countries where the ruler receives "99.99" percent of the vote, saying "if Allah [Himself] were in the running he wouldn't receive such a share" of the vote; Al-Qaradhawi's "support for democracy, in its permissive, infidel meaning"; his negating the principle of Al Wala' Wal Bara' – exclusive allegiance to Allah and Islam, and repudiation of unbelief and unbelievers – by referring to Copts as 'our Christian brothers', urging the use of the term non-Muslims instead of kuffar, which (according to and Al-Tartusi) are in violation of Quranic verses which forbid Muslims to befriend non-Muslims.

Abu Basir was strongly supportive of opposition to the Syrian government, during the Syrian civil war he established a Facebook page called al-Mu’arada al-islamiya lil-nizam al-souri (Islamic Opposition to the Regime in Syria) and in May 2012 he appeared in an online video clip alongside armed rebels, implying he was taking part in fighting inside Syria. This appeared to be confirmed in an online video in October 2012, apparently filmed near Latakia where he is seen alongside scores of armed rebels in a paramilitary group called Ansar al-Sham. In 2014 the cleric is described as the revolutionary mufti of Syria by a popular Islamic dawah website.

On 17 February 2017, Abu Basir al-Tartusi was criticized and attacked by Tariq Abdelhaleem.

On 3 March 2017, he made a statement demanding a trial of Al-Nusra Front leader Ahmed al-Sharaa for crimes against "Syria's revolution".

== See also ==
- Abu Muhammad al-Maqdisi, Jordan-based Palestinian cleric with close ties to Abu Musab al-Zarqawi.
- Muhammad Surur, Syrian cleric and editor based in London with similar views.
- Abu Qatada al-Filistini, Palestinian cleric and editor based in London, notorious for fueling the Algerian Civil War in the 1990s.
- Salafist jihadism
