= Madkhalism =

Strain of Salafi thought

Madkhalism is a strain of quietist thought within the larger Salafi movement characterised by absolute loyalty towards the ruler of a state, based on the writings of the Saudi scholar Rabee al-Madkhali.

Originating in Saudi Arabia, the movement lost its support base in the country and has mostly been relegated to other countries, with most Saudi Arabians not taking the edicts of Madkhalists seriously. Political scientist Omar Ashour has described the movement as resembling a cult, and English-language media has referred to the group as such. Madkhalism today is mostly popular in Western English-speaking countries and Libya.

In addition to Arab regimes, U.S. policymakers and senior advisors to the U.S. Department of State have also reportedly advised the U.S. government to fund al-Madkhali and his strain of thought.

== History ==
The movement has, in essence, been a reaction against the Muslim Brotherhood, rival Sahwa movement as well as the Qutbi movement; Sayyid Qutb, that movement's figurehead, is considered to be an apostate by Madkhali and his movement. It is strongly backed by the United Arab Emirates.

Rabee al-Madkhali was incredibly influential, most of it through Saudi support, in the early 1990s, during and after the time period the Gulf War was taking place. The Saudi regime attracted great ire from the Sahwa movement, due to their collusion with the US government and the Saudi's allowing US military bases to be set up in the Arabian peninsula. In response, the Saudi government imprisoned the leaders of the movement and strongly promoted al-Madkhali, who supported the regime. Senior US policy makers Will McCants and Jarret Brachman have also advised the US to discreetly fund figures like al-Madkhali to siphon off support for jihadis who advocate for violence against the US military.

At the Madkhalist movement's inception in the early 1990s, the governments of Saudi Arabia and Egypt promoted the group as a counterbalance to more extreme elements of the wider Islamist movement. During this time, a number of radical Jihadists converted to Madkhalism, especially in the Salafist stronghold of Buraidah. In Kuwait, the Madkhali movement was nurtured around individuals who would separate from "mainstream" Salafism in 1981 due to many amongst them entering into the political arena.

After high-ranking members of Saudi Arabia's religious establishment denounced the movement in general, and Saudi Grand Mufti and Permanent Committee head Abdulaziz Al Sheikh's criticism of Rabee al-Madkhali specifically, the movement lost its support base within the wider Arab world. The remaining followers of Madkhali within Saudi Arabia tend to be foreign workers of Western origins, Saudis from Rabee al-Madkhali's hometown, and Kuwaitis and Yemenis. Madkhali also retains a national network of disciples to promote his work and monitor the activities of competitor clerics, and although Madkhalists are outnumbered by followers of Society of the Revival of Islamic Heritage in Kuwait, they retain an extensive international network in the Middle East, Europe and Southeast Asia. Despite losing its audience in its country of origin, the movement had branched outward by the early 2010s, with Madkhalists gaining followers in western Kazakhstan, where the Government of Kazakhstan views them and other Islamists with suspicion. Regardless of these gains, Western analysts have still described the movement as now being relegated to a primarily European phenomenon. Analysts have estimated that Madkhalists and their allies comprise just over half of the Salafist movement in the Netherlands.

On Friday, 24 August 2012, Islamists loyal to Muhammad al-Madkhali, demolished Sufi shrines in Zliten in Libya with construction equipment and bulldozers. The act was condemned by twenty-two NGOs, in addition to the post-war Libyan government's top religious official and UNESCO General Director Irina Bokova. The post-war Libyan government filed a complaint with the Saudi government regarding Muhammad al-Madkhali, who is a professor at the Islamic University of Madinah.

Another break between Madkhalists and the mainstream of purist Salafism has been the reaction to the Arab Spring. While most purist Salafists initially opposed both the Libyan Civil War and the Syrian Civil War, eventually they threw their support behind the opposition in both cases due to the extreme violence on the part of the Gaddafi and Assad regimes; the Madkhalists attacked the mainstream purists for these stances.

As of early 2019, Madkhalists continue to be supported by the Saudi government and have found common cause with Libyan Field Marshal Khalifa Haftar, who has been described as "Libya's most potent warlord", during the Second Libyan Civil War.

Madkhalis have often found themselves supporting opposing political factions in Libya. This is due to the apparently contradictory fatwas issued by Rabee al-Madkhali, Muhammad bin Hadi al-Madkhali and other Salafi scholars.

== Tenets ==
Madkhalism is often compared to Wahhabism, sharing a number of tenets with the wider movement. Media analysts have warned against generalizing such Islamists movements despite their differences, however. Madkhali has borrowed heavily from elder Salafist scholar Muhammad Nasiruddin al-Albani; Madkhali adopted more extreme positions than Albani in his teaching according to Qutbi clerics, however, and Madkhalists were dismayed when Albani praised clerics Safar Al-Hawali and Salman al-Ouda.

A cornerstone of Madkhalist discourse is unquestioning loyalty to governments in public, even those that use extreme and unjustified violence against their subjects. Unlike other Islamist groups which often oppose totalitarian, mostly secular governments in the Middle East, the Madkhalist movement is openly supportive of such regimes. Madkhalists argue that the governments of Arab countries are not to be revolted even if they are oppressive. They hold that God has given the highest Muslim authority this right due to the 59th quranic verse in Surah An-Nisa, which translates as:

“O you who have believed, obey Allah and obey the Messenger and those in authority among you. ”

Relations with governments of countries which are Muslim but not Arab have not always been as smooth. Both Madkhali brothers actively encouraged Muslims inside and outside of Indonesia to join the armed Maluku sectarian conflict which continued from the late 1990s until the early 2000s. In the year 2000, Muhammad al-Madkhali went so far as to declare the prohibition of jihad by then Indonesian President Abdurrahman Wahid, himself an internationally recognized Islamic scholar, as being contrary to sharia law.

Though often lumped together with all other Salafists and Islamists, the Madkhalists have been noted for their opposition to and mutual rivalry with Salafist jihadism. The Madkhalist movement has been described as politically quietist, eschewing the organized political efforts of the mainstream of Salafism and even going as far as to declare religious clerics who participate in modern political system to be heretics or even apostates. Such politically active Salafists are often described by followers of Madkhalism as part of an international conspiracy against "true Salafism." On the other hand, Western intelligence agencies have identified Madkhalists as a group which can be supported and funded discreetly by the US, in comparison to the rest of the groups seen under the wider Salafi movement.

Interaction with non-Muslim societies, where most Madkhalists reside, also distinguishes the movement. While most Salafi Muslims in the Western world are noted for adjusting their religious lifestyles for pragmatic participation in the wider society, Madkhalists in particular are noted for minimizing contact with non-Muslims. Also unlike the wider Islamist movement, Madkhalists don't seem to focus on converting Western societies to Islam due to giving most concern in persuading Muslims to adopt a more orthodox Muslim lifestyle and preferring to simply accept and defend their rights as a minority community.

The polemics of the Madkhalists are markedly different from other Salafist groups as well. A noted feature of Madkhalism during Muslim dogmatic exchanges is clarifying the opponent sect instead of only discourse regarding the topic of discussion. The person of the movement's leader, Rabee al-Madkhali, also carries a heavy focus uncharacteristic of rival movements such as Qutbism. Madkhalists have been described as obsessed with defense of the movement's leader by the Muslim brotherhood who accuse them of often dramatising or exaggerating praise given by Salafist scholars and attempting to stifle or intimidate Salafists with opposing views to those of Madkhali and Madkhalists.

== See also ==
- Haddadism
