= Al-Wala' wal-Bara' =

Concept of "loyalty and disavowal" in Islam

Al-Walāʾ wa-l-Barāʾ (Arabic: ٱلْوَلَاءُ وَٱلْبَرَاءُ, romanized: al-walāʾ wa-l-barāʾ) is an Islamic theological concept that literally translates as "loyalty and disavowal", signifying loving and hating for the sake of God (Allah). Derived from the Qurʾan and Hadith, the principle refers to steadfast devotion to God, Islam, and fellow believers (walāʾ), alongside the theological rejection of polytheism (shirk) and religious hostility toward Islam (barāʾ). While rooted in early Islamic sectarian debates, the doctrine occupies a central place in modern Salafism and Wahhabism, where its application ranges from peaceful social boundary maintenance to politicized ideologies.

== Scriptural basis ==
The concept is derived from the Qurʾan and Hadith literature. The most prominent Quranic proof-text cited for al-barāʾ (disavowal) is Al-Mumtahanah (60:4), which portrays Abraham's dissociation from his polytheistic people and their idolatry:

قَدْ كَانَتْ لَكُمْ أُسْوَةٌ حَسَنَةٌ فِي إِبْرَاهِيمَ وَالَّذِينَ مَعَهُ إِذْ قَالُوا لِقَوْمِهِمْ إِنَّا بُرَآءُ مِنْكُمْ وَمِمَّا تَعْبُدُونَ مِنْ دُونِ اللَّهِ كَفَرْنَا بِكُمْ وَبَدَا بَيْنَنَا وَبَيْنَكُمُ الْعَدَاوَةُ وَالْبَغْضَاءُ أَبَدًا حَتَّىٰ تُؤْمِنُوا بِاللَّهِ وَحْدَهُ إِلَّا قَوْلَ إِبْرَاهِيمَ لِأَبِيهِ لَأَسْتَغْفِرَنَّ لَكَ وَمَا أَمْلِكُ لَكَ مِنَ اللَّهِ مِنْ شَيْءٍ ۖ رَبَّنَا عَلَيْكَ تَوَكَّلْنَا وَإِلَيْكَ أَنَبْنَا وَإِلَيْكَ الْمَصِيرُ

"You have had an excellent example in Abraham and those with him; when they said to their people, 'We are free of you (burāʾu minkum) and of what you worship apart from God (Allah). We renounce you (kafarnā bikum). Enmity and hatred has surfaced between us and you, forever, until you believe in Allah alone'—except for the words of Abraham to his father, 'I will surely ask forgiveness for you, though I do not possess anything for you from Allah.' 'Our Lord, upon You we have relied, and to You we have returned, and to You is the destination.'"

— Quran 60:4

Conversely, al-walāʾ (loyalty and allegiance) is commonly derived from verses in Al-Maʾida, such as 5:55 (إِنَّمَا وَلِيُّكُمُ اللَّهُ وَرَسُولُهُ وَالَّذِينَ آمَنُوا, "Your ally [walīyukum] is none but Allah and His Messenger and those who have believed...") and 5:51, which warns against taking non-believers as awliyāʾ (allies or protectors). In Hadith literature, proponents frequently reference traditions emphasizing religious allegiance, most notably the report: "The strongest bond of faith is to love for the sake of Allah and to hate for the sake of Allah" (أَوْثَقُ عُرَى الْإِيمَانِ الْحُبُّ فِي اللَّهِ وَالْبُغْضُ فِي اللَّهِ, recorded in the collections of Ahmad ibn Hanbal and Abu Dawud).

In classical Quranic exegesis and mainstream Islamic jurisprudence, this disavowal is understood primarily as a theological rejection of polytheism and religious hostility rather than a prohibition of amicable interpersonal relations with non-Muslims. Scholars contextualize verse 60:4 by referencing subsequent verses in the same chapter (Al-Mumtahanah 60:8–9), which explicitly permit kindness (بِرّ, birr) and justice (قِسْط, qisṭ) toward non-Muslims who do not fight Muslims on account of their religion or expel them from their homes. Classical scholars further distinguish between religious allegiance (walāʾ) and natural human affection (مَوَدَّة, mawaddā) or benevolent worldly dealings (مُعَامَلَة, muʿāmala), noting that the Qurʾan permits loving marriage with scriptuary women (5:5, 30:21) and explicitly mandates kind and respectful treatment of non-Muslim parents and relatives in worldly affairs (Luqman 31:15).

== History ==
Historically, the earliest groups to formalize walāya (loyalty) and barāʾa (disavowal) into a distinct doctrinal test of community membership were the early Khawarij and Ibaḍi movements. Later on, a parallel concept (tawalla and tabarra) became central to later Shiʿi theology, denoting allegiance to the Ahl al-Bayt (the Prophet's family) and dissociation from their perceived adversaries. Early Sunni scholars were consequently wary of the terminology due to its association with heterodox sectarianism; the founder of the Hanbali school, Ahmad ibn Hanbal (d. 241 AH / 855 CE), as recorded by Abu Bakr al-Khallal, famously dismissed sectarian declarations of walāya and barāʾa regarding specific historical individuals as a religious innovation (bidʿa).

In the 14th century, the Hanbali scholar Ibn Taymiyya (d. 728 AH / 1328 CE) reoriented the concept away from early sectarian debates. Drawing on Quranic injunctions in his treatise Iqtiḍāʾ al-Ṣirāṭ al-Mustaqīm, he emphasized moral and ritual distinctiveness, arguing that Muslims should avoid imitating (tashabbuh) the religious festivals and practices of non-Muslims in order to preserve Islamic identity.

Influenced by Ibn Taymiyya's writings, Muhammad ibn ʿAbd al-Wahhab (d. 1792 CE) and subsequent Najdi scholars—most notably his grandson Sulayman ibn ʿAbdallah Āl ash-Shaykh (d. 1818) and Hamad ibn ʿAtiq (d. 1883) during the Ottoman–Egyptian campaigns in Arabia—elevated al-walāʾ wa-l-barāʾ into a central pillar of dogma (ʿaqīda) and monotheism (tawḥīd). Through this tradition, the doctrine acquired a prominent role in Wahhabism and modern Salafism.

== Theological and modern interpretations ==
In contemporary Salafi theology, al-walāʾ wa-l-barāʾ is defined as holding fast to all that is pleasing to God and withdrawing from all that is displeasing to Him for His sake. In his widely circulated 1980s treatise on the subject, Saudi scholar Muhammad Saʿid al-Qahtani describes al-walāʾ (loving for the sake of God) as showing devotion to God by following the Sharīʿa, loving what is permissible in the Qurʾan and Sunnah, and supporting fellow believers, while al-barāʾ signifies opposing disbelief (kufr), polytheism (shirk), and those who actively oppose the religion (dīn) of Islam.

Scholars of Islamic studies such as Joas Wagemakers and Mohamed Bin Ali distinguish between several competing interpretations of the doctrine in the modern era:

- Quietist and social-conservative interpretation: Emphasizes personal piety, ritual purity, and cultural boundary maintenance. Proponents focus on avoiding the imitation of non-Muslim religious customs (such as participating in non-Islamic religious holidays) while maintaining that worldly cooperation, trade, fair treatment, and peaceful coexistence with non-Muslims remain permissible under Islamic law.
- Political and Jihadi-Salafi interpretation: Beginning in the late 20th century—most notably through the writings of Juhayman al-Otaybi and later systematized by the ideologue Abu Muhammad al-Maqdisi—militant theorists politicized al-walāʾ wa-l-barāʾ. Al-Maqdisi linked the concept to state legislation and international military alliances, arguing that muslim rulers who govern by secular laws (ṭaġūt) or form military coalitions with non-Muslim powers against Muslims violate al-walāʾ wa-l-barāʾ and thereby commit apostasy (takfīr).
- Mainstream critiques and re-evaluations: Traditional Sunni scholars as well as contemporary Salafi establishment figures have criticized the militant politicization of the doctrine as a distortion of classical Islamic jurisprudence, emphasizing that political treaties, diplomatic relations, and peaceful civic interactions with non-Muslim states and citizens do not constitute prohibited religious allegiance (tawallī).

== See also ==
- Tawalla & Tabarra, similar concept in Shia theology.
- Tawḥid
- Ḥanif
