= Manhaj =

Method, path, or doctrine in Islam

Manhaj (منهج) is an Arabic word meaning method, path or doctrine. In Islam, the systematic method of upholding Aqidah and performing deeds is called Manhaj. It is an important part of Salafism. Salafism consists of two main areas, namely Aqidah and Manhaj. Aqidah refers to the beliefs of Salafis, while Manhaj refers to how these beliefs are practiced. Muhammad Nasiruddin al-Albani, when asked about the importance and difference between these two elements, replied that "Aqidah is more specific than Manhaj." He further emphasized that both Aqidah and Manhaj are inseparable for one to become a Salafi and one cannot become Salafi in Aqidah by applying Manhaj to the Ikhwani Salafi. In the case of Manhaj, it is the element of modern Salafism that bears witness to differences and diversity. Some believe that Salafi Manhaj can also be seen in different forms. For example, Saleh al-Fawzan states that Manhaj means "the method of implementing the beliefs and laws of Islam" and that it comes in three different forms, namely, the method of dealing with religious sources (the Qur'an, the Sunnah, and the well-known sayings of the Ulama), the method of worship or the way of worship and the way of dealing with the community or Ummah.

== Tenets ==
Salafi scholar and professor of Umm al-Qura University Muhammad ibn Umar ibn Salim Bazmul elaborates on this in his book Salafi Manhaj, the discussion of which is as follows:

1. First objective: Definition of Salafi system, its principles, rules for its adherence and mention of its virtues, basic principles of Salafi.
  1. First principle: Establishing the worship of Allah through adherence to the Book (Qur'an) and Sunnah according to the sense of the pious predecessors (al-Salaf al-Salih).
  2. Second Principle: To hold fast the Jamaat and to listen and obey [the Muslim rulers].
  3. Third principle: Being extremely cautious about religious innovations (bid'at) and religious innovators (mubatadiun).
    1. Salafis stay away from gatherings of religiously innovative (bida'i) people.
    2. Provisions regarding following the Salafi system.
    3. Benefits of following the Salafi method.
2. Second objective: Distinctive features of the Salafi system.
  1. The first characteristic: Their allegiance and separation (al-Wala' wa al-Bara') revolved around following the path of the Messenger, may God bless him and grant him peace.
  2. Second characteristic: Their characteristic is that they follow the Sunnah.
  3. Third characteristic: They are moderate and moderate in all their affairs.
  4. Fourth characteristic: They are people who are united and covenantal and they are firm and determined on the truth.
  5. Fifth characteristic: They work towards establishing religion by seeking and applying correct Islamic knowledge.
3. Third objective: Ways to achieve correction according to the Sunnah and ideals of the people of the Jamaat.
  1. First Criterion: The beginning and basis of this amendment is worshiping Allah and uniting Him with Islamic monotheism (Tawhid).
  2. Second Criterion: Correction begins with the individual and it does not begin with the community, the leader or others besides him – in fact each individual should begin with himself then those who are closest to him and then those who are closest to him.
  3. Third Criterion: The importance of knowledge precedes speech and action.
  4. Fourth Criterion: Knowledge should be consistent with the knowledge of the predecessors (al-Salaf al-Salih).
  5. Fifth Criterion: Equipping oneself while calling [to Allah] with the qualities described in the Qur'an, the Hadith of the Prophet, and the narrations of the Salaf.
