= Ulu'l-amr =

Those charged with authority in Islam

In Islamic culture, the term ulu'l-amr (Arabic: أولو الأمر) or uli'l-amr (Arabic: أولي الأمر) refers to "those charged with authority or responsibility or decision, or the settlement of affairs". It is referenced in the 59th verse of the fourth chapter of the Qur'an, and outlines the necessity of Islamic followers to obey the control of Allah, Muhammad and those in authority as long as they too obey Allah and Muhammad. They are seen as the leaders and scholars of Islamic culture.

== Qur'an ==
Obedience to political authorities in Islam refers to Surah Nisa verse 59, known as the 'verse of obedience' (Arabic: آية الطاعة), which calls for obedience to Allah and the Islamic Prophet Muhammad as well as to the ulu'l-amr or incumbent authorities (rulers and ulama), which is obedience to valid Islamic injunctions. Obedience to matters, not to un-Islamic orders.

O believers! Obey Allah, obey the Messenger, and obey those who are in power among you (ulil amri minkum), then if you differ in any matter, refer it to Allah and the Messenger, if you believe in Allah and the Hereafter. This is the best way and ultimately the best.

— Surah Nisa, verse 59

Verse 83 of Surah Nisa also mentions ulu'l-amr or the holder of authority.

And when news of peace or fear reaches them, they suppress it. And if they had been conveyed to the Messenger or to those having authority over them (ulil amri minhum), then the things that are in them that deserve to be searched would have been searched. Indeed, if Allah's grace and mercy had not been upon you, all but a few of you would have followed Satan!

— Surah Nisa, verse 83

== Overview ==
According to scholar Moojan Momen, "One of the key statements in the Qur'an around which much of the exegesis" on the issue of what Islamic doctrine says about who is in charge is based on the verse

"O believers! Obey God and obey the Apostle and those who have been given authority [uulaa'l-amr] among you" (Quran 4:59).

For Sunnīs, the expression "those who have been given authority" (uulaa al-amr) refers to the rulers (caliphs and kings), but for Shīʿas it refers to the Imams. According to the British historian and Orientalist scholar Bernard Lewis, this Quranic verse has been

elaborated in a number of sayings attributed to Muhammad. But there are also sayings that put strict limits on the duty of obedience. Two dicta attributed to the Prophet and universally accepted as authentic are indicative. One says, "there is no obedience in sin"; in other words, if the ruler orders something contrary to the divine law, not only is there no duty of obedience, but there is a duty of disobedience. This is more than the right of revolution that appears in Western political thought. It is a duty of revolution, or at least of disobedience and opposition to authority. The other pronouncement, "do not obey a creature against his creator," again clearly limits the authority of the ruler, whatever form of ruler that may be.

According to the exegetical interpretation of the medieval Sunnī Muslim scholar Ibn Taymiyyah, for this verse "there is no obedience in sin"; that people should ignore the order of the ruler if it would disobey the divine law and shouldn't use this as excuse for revolution because it will spill Muslims' blood. According to Ibn Taymiyyah, the saying "sixty years with an unjust imam is better than one night without a sultan" was confirmed by experience. He believed that the Quranic injunction to "enjoin good and forbid evil" (al-amr bi-l-maʿrūf wa-n-nahy ʿani-l-munkar, found in Quran 3:104, Quran 3:110, and other verses) was the duty of every state functionary with charge over other Muslims, from the caliph to "the schoolmaster in charge of assessing children's handwriting exercises."

== Exegesis of the revelation ==
Sunni scholars says that, and according to hadith of Sihah Sittah and Tafsir Ibn Kathir, the verse of Obedience about ulu'l-amr was revealed about an incident of sahaba Abd Allah ibn Hudhafa. Muhammad once sent him as a military leader of some sahabas, on the way he became furious and told them to make coils of fire, and to plunge into it. However, Imam Asakir Zuhri said, Abdullah was a humorous person. He made this order in jest. After returning from the expedition, the Islamic prophet Muhammad said, obedience to the leader is only wajib in those matters which Allah has permitted.

It was narrated from Ibn 'Abbas (concerning the Verse): "O you who believe! Obey Allah and obey the Messenger (Muhammad) ( يَا أَيُّهَا الَّذِينَ آمَنُوا أَطِيعُوا اللَّهَ وَأَطِيعُوا الرَّسُولَ )". That he said: This was revealed concerning 'Abdullah bin Hudhaifah bin Qais bin 'Adiyy, whom the Messenger of Allah appointed in charge of an expedition"

— Sunan an-Nasa'i 4194

It was narrated from Abu Sa’eed Al-Khudri that the Messenger of Allah (ﷺ) sent ‘Alqamah bin Mujazziz at the head of a detachment, and I was among them. When he reached the battle site, or when he was partway there, a group of the army asked permission to take a different route, and he gave them permission, and appointed ‘Abdullah bin Hudhafah bin Qais As-Sahmi as their leader, and I was one of those who fought alongside him. When we were partway there, the people lit a fire to warm themselves and cook some food. ‘Abdullah, who was a man who liked to joke, said: “Do I not have the right that you should listen to me and obey?” They said: “Yes.” He said: “And if I command you to do something, will you not do it?” They said: “Of course.” He said: “Then I command you to jump into this fire.” Some people got up and got ready to jump, and when he saw that they were about to jump, he said: “Restrain yourselves, for I was joking with you.” When we came to Al-Madinah, they mentioned that to the Prophet (ﷺ), and the Messenger of Allah (ﷺ) said: “Whoever among you commands you to do something that involves disobedience to Allah, do not obey him.”

— Sunan Ibn Majah 2863

== Arbitration and Ikhtilaf ==
After Muhammad's death, the Verse of Obedience stipulates that disagreements or Ikhtilaf are to be arbitrated by referring to the Quran and Sunnah. While those in authority are absent from arbitration here, they are mentioned elsewhere in verse 5:83, which includes the passage, "And whenever tidings come unto them, whether of security or fear, they spread it about, whereas had they referred it to the Messenger and to those in authority among them, those of them whose task it is to investigate would have known it." Lalani attributes to the Twelver Imam al-Baqir (d. c. 114/732) this argument, which also appears in al-Jami' li-ahkam al-Quran by the Sunni al-Qurtubi (d. 671/1272).

According to Verse of Obedience, if there is any debate or ikhtilaf about any religious matter or rule, then Quran orders to retern to Quran and Sunnah to dismiss ikhtilaf and to avoid taqlid.

== The ulu'l-amr today ==
Today, the ulu'l-amr are still quite relevant. Societies whose cultures still rely heavily on Islamic teachings, such as Saudi Arabia, continue to preach the values of following the leadership of the religious authority figures through schools of thought such as Madkhalism, which place emphasis on obeying ulu'l-amr. This has caused issues due to the clash between the traditionalist views of the ulu'l-amr and the progressive desires of the youth. The authority figures believe that their role is to advise their people; however some think they have done more to restrict them and keep them submissive. Whether or not this verse intends to keep the majority of people under the control of a few, it is quite polarizing. It is referred to by political classicists to "make submission to rulers a religious obligation." However, others defend it as necessary to ensure that governments remain inherently religious and devoted to the teachings of the Qur'an.

== Selection ==
Ulil Amr was elected by Ahl al-hall wal-aqd.

== Conditions to be met by Ulu'l-Amr (the ruler) ==
Justice that encompasses its conditions and knowledge that leads to diligence in calamities and rulings. The integrity of the senses of hearing, sight, and tongue, so that what is perceived directly with it is correct, and the integrity of the members from deficiency that prevents the fulfillment of movement and the speed of advancement.

=== Duties of Ulu'l-Amr (the ruler) ===
The duty of the ruler is several things:

1. Preserving religion on its origins.
2. Establishing a fair judiciary among people to preserve their rights.
3. Protecting the country and its security.
4. Applying hudud to preserve the sanctities of God Almighty and the rights of people.
5. Establishing jihad for the sake of God Almighty.
6. Collecting alms and public funds.
7. Distribution of public funds to those who deserve it.
8. Assuming public positions for qualified secretaries.
9. To initiate himself to see things, and browse the conditions; To advance the nation's politics and guard the nation.

=== Ulu'l-Amr's rights ===
Al-Mawardi said: "If the Imam did what we mentioned among the rights of the nation, he fulfilled the right of God Almighty in them and upon them, and he obliged them with rights: obedience and help did not change their condition."

== See also ==
- Verse of Obedience
- Ikhtilaf
- Political aspects of Islam
- Ismah
