= Alastair Crooke =

British diplomat

Alastair Crooke CMG
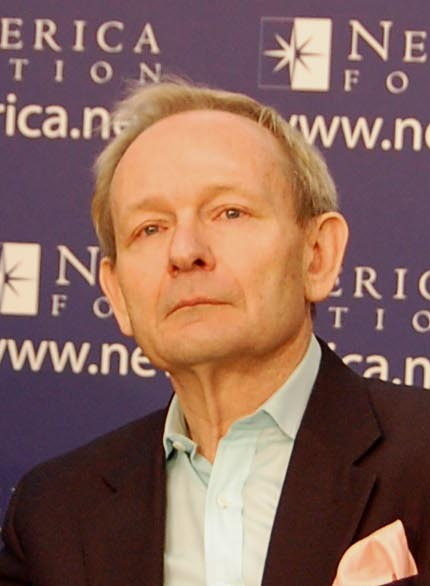
- Alastair Crooke in 2009

Security adviser to the EU special envoy to the Middle East
- In office 1997–2003

Personal details
- Born: 30 June 1949 (age 77) Dún Laoghaire, Ireland
- Children: 5
- Education: University of St Andrews

Alastair Warren Crooke CMG (sometimes misspelled as Alistair Crooke), born 30 June 1949, is a former British diplomat, and is the founder and director of the Beirut-based Conflicts Forum, an organisation that advocates for engagement between political Islam and the West. Previously he was a ranking figure in both British intelligence (MI6) and European Union diplomacy.

== Early life and education ==
Crooke was born in Dún Laoghaire, Ireland, to Frederick Montague Warren and Shona Ann Thomson. His elder brother was Ian W T Crooke, who became an SAS officer, eventually commanding 23 Special Air Service Regiment. Crooke was brought up mostly in Rhodesia (now Zimbabwe). He was educated at Aiglon College in Switzerland and at the University of St. Andrews (1968–1972) in Scotland, from which he obtained an MA in moral philosophy and political economy.

== Career ==
Crooke started his career in London banking for a few years.

Crooke later worked for nearly 30 years in the Secret Intelligence Service (MI6) under diplomatic cover in Northern Ireland, South Africa, Cambodia, Colombia, Pakistan and the Middle East. His early work included helping provide weapons to jihadists fighting the Soviets in Afghanistan and assisting in the Northern Ireland peace process.

In 1997, he became a security adviser to the EU special envoy to the Middle East, and operating out of the British Embassy in Tel Aviv was involved in British attempts to draw Hamas, Islamic Jihad and other Palestinian groups into the political process. He was involved in negotiations to end the Israeli army's siege of Yasser Arafat's compound in Ramallah and the Church of the Nativity in Bethlehem. He assisted the negotiation of several local truces between the Israelis and Palestinians during the early 2000s. Crooke had good contacts with the Israeli military and intelligence services.

He was a member of the Mitchell Committee into the causes of the Second Intifada in 2000.

In 2001, British ambassador to Israel Francis Cornish described him as "a person who worked with the security apparatuses of both sides. He went into action after they stopped trusting each other and developed a special skill to persuade them of the logic of things and to bridge the lack of confidence between them." He had a central role in establishing a Hamas ceasefire in 2002.

His MI6 background was exposed by Israeli newspaper Maariv in 2002. In September 2003, he was instructed to leave the Middle East, against his wishes, because of "personal security reasons" with a British embassy spokesman saying "We do think he's done a really difficult job in difficult conditions and has been outstanding at doing it."

In the 2004 New Year Honours list, he was awarded the CMG for services to the advancement of the Middle East peace process.

Crooke established Conflicts Forum in 2004, largely based in Beirut, with the aim of helping western governments understand Islamist groups and their military resistance to Israel. It was initially funded by some private donors, a small grant from the US Institute of Peace and some European Union funding to run a series of seminars.

== Later life ==
His 2009 book Resistance: The Essence of the Islamist Revolution provides background on what he calls the "Islamist Revolution" in the Middle East, helping to offer strategic insights into the origins and logic of Islamist groups which have adopted military resistance as a tactic, including Hamas and Hezbollah.

In 2011, The Spectator published an apology for a story by Melanie Phillips which contained an allegation about Crooke that the magazine acknowledged was "completely false". The New Statesman reported that damages of "tens of thousands of pounds" were made to Crooke.

Since 2018, he has written frequently for the Russian think tank Strategic Culture Foundation, and since 2023 for the U.S. based Eurasia Review. He is a frequent guest on YouTube podcasts Andrew Napolitano's "Judging Freedom" and Nima Alkhorshid's "Dialogue Works".

== Private life ==
Crooke married in 1976; they had three sons, and later divorced. In 2005 he moved to Beirut with his partner; they had a son and a daughter and married in 2012.
