= Mahmud al-Haddad =

Egyptian Islamic scholar

Shaykh Mahmud al-Haddad

Personal life
- Born: 1954 (age 71–72) Tanta, Egypt
- Notable idea: Haddadism
- Occupation: Islamic scholar

Religious life
- Religion: Islam
- Jurisprudence: Ghayr Muqallid
- Creed: Athari
- Movement: Haddadism

Muslim leader
- Disciple of: Rabi' al-Madkhali

Abu Abdullah Mahmud bin Muhammad al-Haddad (Arabic: أبو عبدالله محمود بن محمد الحداد, romanized: Abū ʻAbd Allāh Maḥmūd bin Muḥammad al-Ḥaddād) is an Egyptian Islamic scholar who is credited with founding the Salafi faction known as Haddadism.

== Biography ==
Al-Haddad was born in Egypt and came to Saudi Arabia to study Salafism and preach it. However, his hardline stances on several issues led to his expulsion from Saudi Arabia.

Al-Haddad's controversial views include that Ibn Taymiyya united with the people of innovation and that the books of al-Nawawi and Ibn Hajar al-Asqalani should be burned. Saudi scholars Rabi' al-Madkhali and Abdulaziz al-Reis harshly criticized al-Haddad for these views.

== See also ==
- Madkhalism
- Hazimism
- Ahmad ibn Umar al-Hazimi
