= Bid'ah =

Innovation in religious matters in Islam

In Islam and sharia (Islamic law), bidʿah (Arabic: بدعة [ˈbɪdʕæ], lit. 'innovation') refers to innovation in religious matters. The category is further divided into bid'ah al-ibadat and bi'da al-mu'amalat. The first category refers to innovations in sacred matters, such as worship, and are generally forbidden as it violates the textual source of the Quran and the Sunnah. The second refers to innovations in the mundane realm and is often permissible, as long as it does not violate the Sharia.

Linguistically, as an Arabic word, the term can be defined more broadly, as "innovation, novelty, heretical doctrine, heresy". In classical Arabic literature outside of religion, bidʻah has been used as a form of praise for outstanding compositions of prose and poetry. The alternative positive concept for bidah is maslaha.

== History ==
The genre of bidʻah literature began to develop in (roughly) the 9th century CE (the third century of Islam). Kitab Al-I'tisam by Al-Shatibi is thought to be one of the first books on the subject extant. The literature writing continued in the Islamic world until the 14th century CE (roughly 8th century AH), when it underwent a lull before re-emerging in the 20th century CE (roughly the 14th century AH).

According to Malise Ruthven, after the 10th century CE "new attempts at ijtihad" (creative reasoning in legal decisions) "came to be condemned as bidah", because the doctrine that the "gates of Ijtihad" were closed began to be accepted. Ijtihad began to be replaced with taqlid ("imitation", i.e. following legal precedents). By the time of the Islamic Middle Ages, according to Muhammad F. Sayeed, "allegation of 'bidah' became a formidable weapon against progress". The consensus against ijtihad and in favor of taqlid lasted until the eighteenth and nineteenth centuries when Ijtihad was resurrected.

In the 15th and 16th centuries C.E., according to Mehram Kamrava, Islam's "conservative default" and opposition to innovation and the institutions they depended on, started to became a serious handicap. Economic instruments — "impersonal contracts, financial exchange mechanisms, corporations and record keeping" — that fostered and protected capital and entrepreneurship and led to the flourishing of rival Europe, were not to be found in Islamic world.

=== Punishment ===
Bernard Lewis writes that accusations of apostasy because of bidʻah were common in early and classical Islam, but practitioners of bidʻah were usually subject not to execution (the traditional punishment for apostasy in Islam), but to something like quarantine or admonition. Only when their innovation "was extreme, persistent, and aggressive" were they "ruthlessly extirpated".

== Definitions and categorizations ==
=== Religious and non-religious types ===
A distinction is sometimes made between the "linguistic" definition of bidʻah in the Arabic language, whose scope includes new concepts, activities, gadgets, etc. that can involve either worldly or religious matters; and the "shariah" definition of Bid'ah, which includes (and forbids) anything introduced to Islam that was not done in the time of Muhammad or the Rashidun.

A number of contemporary Muslim sources (Mufti Muhammad ibn Adam, Darul Iftaa Leicester, UK, Islam Online, Word of Prophet blog) distinguish between religious (the shariah definition above) and non-religious innovation, either declaring non-religious innovation outside of bidʻah, or bidʻah but of a permissible kind.

=== In religious matters ===
==== Definitions of bidʻah ====
- "A newly invented" belief or action "in the religion, in imitation of the Shariah (prescribed Law), by which nearness to Allah is sought, [but] not being supported by any authentic proof – neither in its foundations, nor in the manner in which it is performed" (Abu Ishaq al-Shatibi, 1320 – 1388 C.E.).
- Any practice or a belief which is "possibly contrary to Islam" because it was not present in Islam when the Quran was revealed and Sunnah established by hadith. Muslims disagree over whether any and all bidʻah is rejected, or whether there is bidʻah hasanah (good innovation) that does not contradict "the spirit of Islam" (the "majority" view) (Cyril Glasse).
- "Any modification of accepted religious belief or practice" (Mehram Kamrava).
- "Any innovation that has no roots in the traditional practice (Sunnah) of the Muslim community" (Britannica).
- "Heterodox" Islamic doctrines, (primary meaning of bidʻah in early Islamic history)(Jamaluddin ibn al-Manzur al-Masri).
- Any newly invented matter that is without precedent and is in opposition to the Qur'an and Sunnah (meaning of bidʻah in Islamic law, when used without qualification) (Jamaluddin ibn al-Manzur al-Masri).
- "Any invented way aimed at worshipping or drawing closer to Allah" that is
  - not referred to specifically in Sharia, and
  - for which there is no evidence (daleel) in the Quran or Sunnah, and
  - which was not known at the time of Muhammad and his Companions. (Muhammed Salih Al-Munajjid).
- Religious innovations in Islam which may be divided into two kinds, (Mohammed F. Sayeed, Muzammil H. Siddiqi, President of the Fiqh Council of North America),
  - lawful/good (bidʻah hasanah) also praiseworthy (maḥmūdah), which have "some basis (asl) in the Shari`ah (Islamic law) to make it acceptable";
  - unlawful innovations (bidʻah sayyiah) also blameworthy (madhmūmah), which do not have a basis in the Shari`ah.

==== Good and bad bid'ah ====
According to Al-Shafi'i (founder of the Shafi'i school of Sunni jurisprudence), lawful/good (bidʻah hasanah), are in harmony with the Qur’an, Sunnah, traceable tradition (Athar) and the consensus (Ijma`) of Muslims, and unlawful innovations (bidʻah sayyiah) are not. Others (Al-`Izz ibn `Abdus-Salam) have divided Bid'ah into the five "decisions" of fiqh (al-aḥkām al-khamsa) of obligatory, recommended, allowed, condemned, forbidden. Examples of the five decisions on bid'ah are:

1. among bidʻahs required of the Muslim community (farḍ kifāyah) are the study of Arabic grammar and philology as tools for the proper understanding of the Qurʾān, evaluation of Hadith (traditions or sayings of the Prophet Muhammad) to determine their validity, the refutation of heretics, and the codification of law;
2. strictly forbidden (muḥarramah) are bidʿahs that undermine the principles of orthodoxy and thus constitute unbelief (kufr);
3. recommended (mandūb) is the founding of schools and religious houses;
4. disapproved (makrūh) are the ornamentation of mosques and the decoration of the Qurʾān; and finally
5. the law is indifferent (mubāḥah) to the bidʿahs of fine clothing and good food.

One type of innovation that does not fall into the category of forbidden bidʻah despite involving religion, are acts for which at the time of Muhammad and the Salaf there was no apparent need and so did not exist, but that now are needed to implement some religious objective. Examples being: "building religious institutions, recording the research of Islamic schools of legal thought, writing books on beneficial subjects, establishing sciences in order to understand the Qur’an and Sunnah, using of modern weapons for Jihad, etc…".

==== Bid'ah as only bad ====
A more strict view of bidʻah was taken by Malik ibn Anas who stated:

“Whosoever innovates an innovation believing it to be good (hasana) has indeed claimed that the Prophet (Allah bless him & give him peace) breached the trust of Prophethood, because Allah Almighty says: 'This day I have perfected your religion for you'. Anything that was not part of religion on that day, can not be a part of religion today.”

Since God's Messenger cannot be in error on religious matters, innovation cannot be good.

The strict Ḥanbalī school of fiqh and the Wahhābi movement reject bidʻah "completely, arguing that the duty of a Muslim was to follow the example set by the Prophet (Sunnah) and not try to improve on it", according to Britannica. (This is sometimes called the "technical" definition of bid'ah).

In comparing bidʻah to the Christian concept of heresy, Bernard Lewis says, "the gravamen of a charge of [innovation] against a doctrine was not, primarily, that it was false but that it was new – a breach of custom and tradition, respect for which is reinforced by the belief in the finality and perfection of the Muslim revelation." Bidah differed from heresy in that heresy was a theological offense but bidʻah more a break with social mores.

Other judgements by scholars on bidʻah include:

- Bidʻah is always bad but if a new thing has origins in the Qur'an and Sunnah it is to be called Bid'ah Logaviyya (verbal innovation), (Ibn Taymiyyah). His definition was not widely accepted during his own lifetime.
- Introducing and acting upon a bid'ah in religious matters is a sin and considered one of the enormities in Islam that is obligatory to immediately desist and repent from (Muhammad ibn Ahmad al-Dhahabi).

One scholar explains the basis of this view on "Islam's self-image of timeless perfection", where since its social order is "already flawless, ... innovation cannot yield benefits and may well do harm".

==== Debate between schools of thought ====
Part of the debate amongst Sunni scholars over what qualifies a particular action as a bid'ah in the religion is associated with schools within Islam. Scholars affiliated to the Salafi sects argue for an exclusive, literal definition that entails anything not specifically performed or confirmed by Muhammad.

Practitioners of Sufism, in contrast, argue for an inclusive, holistic definition. Umar Faruq Abd-Allah writes:

[B]id’ah could take on various shades of meaning. When used without qualifying adjectives, it tended to be condemnatory, as, for example, in the statement, "bid'ah must be avoided" Nevertheless, bid'ah was not always something bad. In certain contexts, especially when qualified by adjectives, bid'ah could cover a wide range of meanings from what was praiseworthy to what was completely wrong, as, for example, in the caliph ‘Umar's statement below, "what an excellent bid'ah is this!"

— Umar Faruq Abd-Allah, Innovation and Creativity in Islam

A contemporary example of what some Muslims believe is overly harsh interpretation of bid'ah is given by Murad Wilfried Hofmann who was accused of bidah at Salah prayers in Riyadh Saudi Arabia after he shook hands with other Muslims in the mosque, and said to them "Taqabbala Allahu (May Allah accept your prayer)".

== Hadith of early Muslims ==
=== Against bidʻah ===
A large number hadith narrate Companions of Muhammad or offspring of companions (taba'een) condemning religious innovation in some way.

Ali ibn Abi Talib, of the Rashidun (rightly guided Caliphs), said; "He who innovates or gives protection to an innovator, there is a curse of Allah and that of His angels and that of the whole humanity upon him." Abdullah ibn Umar said: "Every innovation is misguidance, even if the people see it as something good."

Abd Allah ibn Abbas (619–687 CE), a companion of Muhammad and early Islamic scholar also said: "Indeed the most detestable of things to Allah are the innovations." Sufyan al-Thawri, a tabi'i Islamic scholar, Hafiz and jurist, mentions: "Innovation is more beloved to Iblees than sin, since a sin may be repented for but innovation is not repented for." He also said, "Whoever listens to an innovator has left the protection of Allāh and is entrusted with the innovation."

A person once sent salaam to Abdullah ibn Umar who replied: "I do not accept his salaam, as this person has innovated by becoming Qadariyah (A sect which does not believe in destiny.")

Al-Fudayl ibn 'Iyad (died 803 CE) is reputed to have said: "I met the best of people, all of them people of the Sunnah, and they used to forbid from accompanying the people of innovation."

Early scholar Hasan al-Basri (642-728 CE) mentions: "Do not sit with the people of innovation and desires, nor argue with them, nor listen to them".

Ibraaheem ibn Maysarah mentions: "Whoever honours an innovator has aided in the destruction of Islam."

Al-Hasan ibn 'Ali al-Barbahari (867-941 CE) mentions: "The innovators are like scorpions. They bury their heads and bodies in the sand and leave their tails out. When they get the chance they sting; the same with the innovators who conceal themselves amongst the people, when they are able, they do what they desire."

Abu Haatim said: "A sign of the people of innovation is their battling against the people of Narrations."

Abu Uthman al-Sabuni (983-1057 CE) said: "The signs of the people of innovation are clear and obvious. The most apparent of their signs is their severe enmity for those who carry the reports of the Prophet."

Ahmad Sirhindi (1564 – 1624/1625 CE) has explained about Bid'ah in his letter, that according to his view, Bid'ah are the opposite of Sunnah or Hadith traditions of Muhammad.

=== Assuming good and bad bidʻah ===
Companions and at least one early scholar (Al-Shafi'i) have also made statements referring to good bidʻah or which assume a difference between good and bad bidʻah:

Jabir ibn Abd Allah narrated: "The Messenger of Allah ... said: 'Whoever starts a good thing and is followed by others, will have his own reward and a reward equal to that of those who follow him, without it detracting from their reward in any way. Whoever starts a bad thing and is followed by others, will bear the burden of his own sin and a burden equal to that of those who follow him, without it detracting from their burden in any way.'" (al-Tirmidhi, no. 2675, sahih hasan hadith)

Jabir ibn Abd Allah said that Muhammad said that those who introduced a good precedent in Islam which others followed (by people) would be rewarded as would those who followed it, and someone who introduced a bad precedent which others followed would be punished, as would the followers.

Anas ibn Malik said "I heard the Prophet say: 'My nation will not unite on misguidance, so if you see them differing, follow the great majority.'" (Note: The grade of the Hadith is da'eef i.e. weak)

Abu Hurairah said that Muhammad said, "Whoever prayed at night the whole month of Ramadan out of sincere Faith and hoping for a reward from Allah, then all his previous sins will be forgiven." After Muhammad's death the people continued observing that (i.e. Nawafil offered individually, not in congregation), and it remained as it was during the Caliphate of Abu Bakr and in the early days of Umar ibn Al-Khattab's Caliphate. During Ramadan upon seeing people praying in different groups, Umar ordered Ubayy ibn Ka'b to lead the people in congregational prayer. On this Umar said: 'What an excellent Bida (i.e. innovation in religion at that time from an earlier time) this is; but the prayer which they do not perform, but sleep at its time is better than the one they are offering.'

Salman al-Farsi said that when Muhammad was asked by some of the companions about the permissibility and prohibition of certain items, he said "Halal is that which Allah has made Halal in His book, Haram is that which Allah has made Haram in His book and about which he has remained silent is all forgiven."

Abu Hurairah said that at the time of the Fajr prayer Muhammad asked Bilal ibn al-Harith, "Tell me of the best deed you did after embracing Islam, for I heard your footsteps in front of me in Paradise." Bilal replied, "I did not do anything worth mentioning except that whenever I performed ablution during the day or night, I prayed after that ablution as much as was written for me." Ibn Hajar al-Asqalani says in Fath al-Bari that "the hadith shows it is permissible to use personal reasoning (ijtihad) in choosing times for acts of worship, for Bilal reached the conclusion he mentioned by his own inference and the Prophet (Allah bless him and give him peace) confirmed him therein." Similar to this, Khubayb ibn Adiy asked to pray two rak’as before being executed by idolators in Mecca, and was hence the first to establish the sunna of two rak'as for those who are steadfast in going to their death.

Rifaa ibn Rafi narrated: When we were praying behind the Prophet and he raised his head from bowing and said, "Allah hears whoever praises Him," a man behind him said, "Our Lord, Yours is the praise, abundantly, wholesomely, and blessedly."When he rose to leave, the Prophet asked who said it, and when the man replied that it was he, the Prophet said, "I saw thirty-odd angel each striving to be the one to write it." Ibn Hajar al-Asqalani comments in Fath al-Bari that the hadith "indicates the permissibility of initiation new expression of dhikr in the prayer other than the ones related through hadith texts (even though this is still reported in the hadiths), as long as they do not contradict those conveyed by the hadith. It is clear that this is since the above were a mere enhancement and addendum to the know, sunna dhikr."

Imam Shafi'i (767–820 CE) gave the following advice, "An innovation which contradicts the Qurʼan, Sunnah, an Athar or Ijma is a heretical bid'a: if however something new is introduced which is not evil in itself and does not contradict the above mentioned authorities of religious life, then it is a praiseworthy, unobjectional bid'a." This can infer worldly bid'a or technology.

== In Shi'a Islam ==
According to Shi'a Islam the definition of bidʻah is anything that is introduced to Islam as either being fard (Arabic: فرض, lit. 'mandatory'), mustahabb (Arabic: مستحب, lit. 'recommended'), mubah (Arabic: مباح, lit. 'permissible'), makruh (Arabic: مكروه, lit. 'reprehensible') or haram (Arabic: حرام, lit. 'forbidden') that contradicts the Qurʼan or hadith. Any new good practice introduced that does not contradict the Qurʼan or hadith is permissible. However, it is not permissible to say that a new good practice (that does not contradict the Qurʼan or hadith) is obligatory, highly recommended or "sunnah" proper. Hence, the Shiʻa stance mirrors the body of Sunni scholars who proffer the idea of "bidʻah hasana" (Arabic: بدعة حسنة). As a general rule in Shiʻa jurisprudence, anything is permissible except whatever is prohibited through divine revelation (i.e. the Qurʼan or hadith).

== Debates ==
Despite the general understanding of standing scholarly disagreements (Arabic: اختلاف, romanized: ikhtilaf), the notion of lawful innovation is a polarizing issue in the Islamic world. A practical example of this is the debate over the permissibility of the mawlid (Arabic: مولد, lit. 'birth') of the prophet Muhammad. All scholars agree that such celebrations did not exist in the early period of Islamic history, and yet mawlid commemorations are a common element in Muslim societies around the world. Even so, Sunni scholars are divided between emphatic unconditional condemnation and conditional acceptance of the celebration with the former insisting it is a bidʻah and thus automatically unlawful, while the latter argues it nonetheless is contextually permissible.

=== Change over time ===
British historian Sadakat Kadri has noted the change over time in what is considered bidʻah.

Hadith were not written down until the 9th century, at least in part because "traditionists such as Ibn Hanbal considered human literature to be an unholy innovation." This interpretation changed even for very conservative jurists such as Ibn Taymiyyah who wrote dozens of books. Ibn Taymiyyah however considered mathematics, a bidah, a false form of knowledge that "does not bring perfection to the human soul, nor save man from castigation of God, nor lead him to a happy life", and forbade its use in determining the beginning of lunar months. Very conservative Wahhabis allow the broadcast of television but Indian Deobandi forbid their followers from watching it, but make use of the more recent invention the internet to issue fatwas. When the beverage known as coffee was introduced to the market of Cairo sometime between 1580 and 1625 CE, it was considered by the ulama to be a bid'ah so offensive to Islam that the pious were urged to attack and demolish establishments serving it. Yet in the 20th century, even so orthodox and conservative Muslims as Saudi Wahhabis thought nothing of serving coffee.

Traditionally who died of plague and who did not was explained as simply the will of God based on al-Bukhari's al-Sahih hadith, but studying the progress of the Black Death (bubonic plague) in the 14th century, scholar Ibn al-Khatib noted those who died had the plague transmitted to them from "garments, vessels, ear-rings; ... persons ... by infection of a healthy sea-port by an arrival from an infected land" whereas isolated individuals were immune. In the Muqaddimah, Ibn Khaldun defends the science of medicine from suggestions that it is an innovation going against the Sunna. "The medicine mentioned in religious tradition ... is in no way part of the divine revelation." It was simply part of "Arab custom and happened to be mentioned in connection with the circumstances of the Prophet, like other things that were customary in his generation." But was "not mentioned in order to imply that [it] is stipulated by the religious law."

A number of contemporary Muslim sources assure readers that Bidah is confined to religion and has nothing to do with technology, However, at the dawn of the Industrial Revolution, European inventions – "steamships, factories, and the telegraph"—were denounced in the Ottoman Empire as innovations leading to wicked deeds. Mehram Kamrava argues that more than doctrinal purity was involved in these attacks on innovation, as the religious beliefs of the ulama (class of religious scholars) were intertwined with their "financial and institutional" special interests—specifically their monopoly control over law and education, which would be undone by major technological advances.

In his Book of Knowledge Al-Ghazali observed that many phenomena once thought bidʻah had come to be though legally unobjectionable.

[A]mong the accepted practices of our time are decorating and furnishing the mosques, and expending great sums of money on their ornate construction and fine rugs which were then considered innovations. These were introduced by the pilgrims, since the early Muslims seldom placed anything on the ground during prayer. Similarly disputation and debate are among the most honoured disciples of the day and are numbered among the best meritorious works (qarubat): nevertheless they were among the taboos at the time of the Companions. The same is true of the chanting (talhiri) of the Quran and the call for prayer, going to excess in matters of cleanliness and being over fastidious in matters of ceremonial purity, ruling clothes unclean on petty and far-fetched grounds, and, at the same time, being lax in ruling foods lawful and unlawful as well as many other like things.

He quoted Hudhayfah ibn al-Yaman approvingly: "Strange as it may seem, accepted practices of today are the taboos of a day gone by. ... And the taboos of today are the accepted practices of a day yet to come."

== See also ==
- Maslaha – temporary jurisprudence of Islam
- Ghulat
- Glossary of Islam
- Ikhtilaf
- Index of Islam-related articles
- Outline of Islam
- Uli al-amr
- Verse of Obedience
