= Taghut =

Islamic term for idols or idolatry

Taghut (Arabic: طاغوت, ṭāġūt; pl. ṭawāġīt (طواغيت); broadly: "to go beyond the measure") is Islamic terminology denoting the worship of another deity besides God. In traditional theology, the term often connotes idols or demons drawn to blood of pagan sacrifices. They appear wherever a person has been murdered. The pre-Islamic deities al-Lāt and al-ʿUzzā, later also Satan, are associated with that term.

In modern times, the term is also applied to earthly tyrannical power. The modern Islamic philosopher Abul A'la Maududi defines taghut in his Quranic commentary as a creature who not only rebels against God but transgresses his will. Due to these associations, in contemporary political discourse, the term is used to refer to people considered anti-Islamic and agent of Western cultural imperialism. The term was introduced to modern political discourse since the usage surrounding Ayatollah Ruhollah Khomeini during the 1979 Iranian Revolution, through accusations made both by and against Khomeini.

== Etymology ==
The Arabic word ṭāġūt is commonly seen as derived from the three-letter verbal root of ط-غ-ي ṭ-ġ-y, which means to "cross the limits, overstep boundaries," or "to rebel." From this, Taghut denotes one who exceeds their limits.

Manfred Kropp traced it to the Ge'ez (Old Ethiopian) ጣዖት ta'ot, meaning false idol.

Taghut is used together with جِبْت jibt in surah al-Nisa 4:51. Wahib Atallah says that these words are of Egyptian origins and explains these words as Hejazi pronunciations of Copt and Thoth.

== In the Quran ==
The term taghut occurs eight times in the Quran. In Pre-Islamic Arabia referring to pagan deities such as Al-Lat and Al-Uzza.

"Do you not see how those given a share of the Scripture, [evidently] now believe in idols and evil powers? (Taghut) They say of the disbelievers, 'They are more rightly guided than the believers."

— Qur'an, Sura 4 (An-Nisa), ayat 51

This is taken to refer to an actual event in which a group of disbelieving Meccans went to two eminent Jewish figures for counsel on the truth of Muhammad's teachings and were told that the pagans were more rightly guided than Muslims.

"Do you [Prophet] not see those who claim to believe in what has been sent down to you, and in what was sent down before you, yet still want to turn to unjust tyrants for judgement, although they have been ordered to reject them? Satan wants to lead them far astray."

— Qur'an, Sura 4 (An-Nisa), ayat 60

The Arabic taghut is variously interpreted to refer to idols, a specific tyrant, an oracle, or an opponent of the Prophet.

"The believers fight for God's cause, while those who reject faith fight for an unjust cause (taghut). Fight the allies of Satan: Satan's strategies are truly weak."

— Qur'an, Sura 4 (An-Nisa), ayat 76

Again, this term taghut has been used here to designate a demon worshipped by the Quraysh.

"There is no compulsion in religion: true guidance has become distinct from error, so whoever rejects (taghut) false gods and believes in God has grasped the firmest hand-hold, one that will never break. God is all hearing, all knowing."

— Qur'an, Sura 2 (Al-Baqarah), ayat 256

== See also ==
- Ifrit
- Jinn
- Munafiq
- Mumin
- Shirk
- Tawhid
