= Muslim (name) =

muslim
- Pronunciation: Arabic: [muslim] Persian: [muslim, moslem]
- Gender: male

Origin
- Origin: Arabic
- Meaning: muslim

Muslim (Arabic: مُسْلِم muslim), also transliterated as Moslem or Müslüm (Turkish), is an Arabic male given name meaning 'pure, clear, immaculate, clean, taintless, straight, absolute', 'devout, god-fearing, pious, complaisant, obedient, submissive', 'virtuous, chaste, modest, blameless, innocent'. The name Muslim is a diminutive of the name Aslam (أَسْلَم aslam), which both names stems from the male noun-name Salaam. It is also the proper name for the followers of the religion Islam and solely a Muslim name. Notable people with the name include:

== Given name ==
=== Moslem ===
- Moslem Uddin Ahmad (1948–2023), Bangladeshi politician
- Moslem Anatouf (born 2006), Algerian footballer
- Moslem Bahadori (1927–2024), Iranian medical scientist
- Moslem Darabi (born 1981), Iranian strongman
- Moslem Eskandar-Filabi (born 1954), Iranian wrestler
- Moslem Firoozabadi, Iranian footballer
- Moslem Al Freej (born 1988), Saudi footballer
- Moslem Uddin Khan (1930–2013), Bangladeshi politician
- Moslem Malakouti (1924–2014), Grand Ayatollah, Iranian Shiite cleric, Marja
- Moslem Mesigar (born 1984), Iranian beach soccer player
- Moslem Mojademi (born 1996), Iranian footballer
- Moslem Ali Mollah, Bengali politician
- Moslem Niadoost (born 1990), Iranian middle-distance runner
- Moslem Oladghobad (born 1995), Iranian futsal player
- Moslem Rahal (born 1977), Syrian musician and composer
- Moslem Rostamiha (born 1992), Iranian futsal player
- Moslem Uddin (1939–2026), Bangladeshi politician

=== Muslim ===
- Muslim (rapper) (born 1981), Moroccan rapper and entrepreneur
- Muslim Agaýew (born 1974), Turkmen professional football
- Muslim Ahmad (born 1989), Malaysian footballer
- Muslim ibn Aqil (died 680), early Islamic figure
- Muslim Arogundade (1926–??), Nigerian athlete
- Muslim Atayev (1973–2005), Chechen militant
- Muslim ibn Kathir al-Azdi (died 680), companion of Hussain ibn Ali
- Muslim Burut (1943–2021), Bruneian writer
- Muslim Daliyev (born 1964), Russian footballer and football coach
- Muslim Evloev (1995–2020), Russian-Kyrgyzstani freestyle wrestler
- Muslim Gadzhimagomedov (born 1997), Russian boxer
- Muslim Guiamaden (born 1963), Filipino politician
- Muslim Kanji (died 2010), Kenyan cricketer
- Muslim Khan (politician), Indian politician
- Muslim Khan (Taliban spokesman) (1954–2017), Pakistani militant
- Muslim Khuchiev (born 1971), Russian politician
- Muslim ibn Sa'id al-Kilabi, governor of Khurasan for the Umayyad Caliphate (723–724)
- Muslim Magomayev (composer) (1885–1937), Azerbaijani composer and conductor
- Muslim Magomayev (musician) (1942–2008), dubbed the "King of Songs" and the "Soviet Sinatra", Soviet Azerbaijani pop singer
- Muslim Mousa (born 2005), Iraqi footballer
- Muslim Mubarak (born 1985), Iraqi footballer
- Muslim Mulliqi (1934–1998), Kosovar painter
- Muslim Musa (born 1997), Afghan cricketer
- Muslim ibn al-Hajjaj Nishapuri (died 875), hadith scholar
- Muslim ibn Quraysh, (died 1085), Uqaylid king (emir) of Mosul and Aleppo during 1061–1085
- Muslim Sadulaev (born 1995), Russian wrestler
- Muslim Salikhov, Russian martial artist
- Muslim Sattarov (born 1965), Uzbekistani ice dancer
- Muslim Shishani (born 1972), Georgian militant
- Muslim Tatriev (born 1980), Russian politician
- Muslim Tulshaev (born 1994), Russian-German mixed martial artist
- Muslim Uddin, Bangladeshi politician
- Muslim Umar (born 2003), Nigerian footballer
- Muslim ibn Uqba, (died 683) general in the Umayyad Caliphate
- Muslim ibn al-Walid (748–823), Abbasid poet
- Muslim Yar (born 1999), German cricketer

=== Müslüm ===
- Müslüm Aydoğan (born 1989), Turkish footballer
- Müslüm Can (born 1975), Turkish footballer
- Müslüm Doğan (born 1959), Turkish politician
- Müslüm Gürses (1953–2013), Turkish folk singer
- Müslüm Yelken (born 1988), Turkish footballer

== Surname ==
- Ahmed Abou Moslem (born 1981), Egyptian footballer
- Azmi Muslim (born 1986), Malaysian footballer

== See also ==
- Müslüm, Polatlı, village in the District of Polatlı, Ankara Province, Turkey
- Muğancıq Müslüm, village and municipality in the Sharur Rayon of Nakhchivan, Azerbaijan
- Christian (given name)
- Muslim (disambiguation)
