= Muğancıq =

Muğancıq, Mughanjik, Moghanjiq:

- Muğancıq Müslüm
- Muğancıq Mehrab
- Mughanjik
- Mughanjugh
- Moghanjiq
- Moghanjiq, West Azerbaijan
