= Muslimism =

Muslimism may refer to:

- Islam, an Abrahamic religion
- Islamism, an Islamic political ideology

== See also ==
- Muslimist (disambiguation)
- Muslim (disambiguation)
- Islamicism (disambiguation)
