= Muslimist =

Muslimist may refer to:

- Muslim, an adherent of Islam
- Islamist, an adherent of Islamism

== See also ==
- Muslimism (disambiguation)
- Muslim (disambiguation)
- Islamicist (disambiguation)
