= Muslim Khan =

Muslim Khan may refer to:

- Muslim Khan (Taliban spokesman)
- Muslim Khan (politician)
