= Islamism by country =

The religio-political ideology of Islamism (also often called political Islam or Islamic fundamentalism) , according to author Robin Wright, it has significantly redefined politics and borders in the Middle East since modern states gained independence, redefining "politics and even borders" (according to at least one observer (author Robin Wright). It is active in many countries around the world.

Islamism has many different varieties, but has been described an ideology seeking to revive Islam to its past assertiveness and glory, purify it of foreign elements, reassert its role into “social and political as well as personal life"; and in particular reorder "government and society in accordance with laws prescribed by Islam" (aka Sharia).

Central and prominent figures in 20th-century Islamism include Hassan al-Banna (founder of the Muslim Brotherhood), Sayyid Qutb, Abul A'la Maududi, Ruhollah Khomeini (founder of the Islamic Republic of Iran), Hassan Al-Turabi.

Al-Banna and Maududi called for a "reformist" strategy to re-Islamizing society through grassroots social and political activism. Other Islamists (Al-Turabi) have advocated a "revolutionary" strategy of Islamizing society through exercise of state power, or for combining grassroots Islamization with violent revolution (Sayyid Qutb). The term has been applied to non-state reform movements, political parties, militias and revolutionary groups. Islamists emphasize the implementation of sharia, pan-Islamic political unity, the creation of Islamic states, (eventually unified), and rejection of non-Muslim influences—particularly Western or universal economic, military, political, social, or cultural.

At least one author (Graham E. Fuller) has argued for a broader notion of Islamism as a form of identity politics, involving "support for [Muslim] identity, authenticity, broader regionalism, revivalism, [and] revitalization of the community." Islamists themselves prefer terms such as "Islamic movement", or "Islamic activism" to "Islamism", objecting to the insinuation that Islamism is anything other than Islam renewed and revived. In public and academic contexts, the term "Islamism" has been criticized as having been given connotations of violence, extremism, and violations of human rights, by the Western mass media, leading to Islamophobia and stereotyping.

Following the Arab Spring, many post-Islamist currents became heavily involved in democratic politics, while others spawned "the most aggressive and ambitious Islamist militia" to date, such as the Islamic State of Iraq and the Levant (ISIL).

== Afghanistan (Taliban) ==
Flag of the Taliban

In Afghanistan, the mujahideen's victory against the Soviet Union in the 1980s did not lead to justice and prosperity, due to a vicious and destructive civil war between political and tribal warlords, making Afghanistan one of the poorest countries on earth. In 1992, the Democratic Republic of Afghanistan ruled by communist forces collapsed, and democratic Islamist elements of mujahideen founded the Islamic State of Afghanistan. In 1996, a more conservative and anti-democratic Islamist movement known as the Taliban rose to power, defeated most of the warlords and took over roughly 80% of Afghanistan.

The Taliban were spawned by the thousands of madrasahs the Deobandi movement established for impoverished Afghan refugees and supported by governmental and religious groups in neighboring Pakistan. The Taliban differed from other Islamist movements to the point where they might be more properly described as Islamic fundamentalist or neofundamentalist, interested in spreading "an idealized and systematized version of conservative tribal village customs" under the label of Sharia to an entire country. Their ideology was also described as being influenced by Wahhabism, and the extremist jihadism of their guest Osama bin Laden.

The Taliban considered "politics" to be against Sharia and thus did not hold elections. They were led by Abdul Ghani Baradar and Mohammed Omar who was given the title "Amir al-Mu'minin" or Commander of the Faithful, and a pledge of loyalty by several hundred Taliban-selected Pashtun clergy in April 1996. Taliban were overwhelmingly Pashtun and were accused of not sharing power with the approximately 60% of Afghans who belonged to other ethnic groups. (see: Taliban#Ideology and aims)

The Taliban's hosting of Osama bin Laden led to an American-organized attack which drove them from power following the 9/11 attacks. The Taliban continued to fight a vigorous insurgency with suicide bombings and armed attacks being launched against NATO and Afghan government targets. The Taliban re-established control of the country in 2021 following a 2020 peace agreement with the United States and the overthrow of the US-backed government.

== Algeria ==
In 1989, a broad Islamist coalition movement was founded in Algeria known as the FIS or Front Islamique de Salut (the Islamic Salvation Front). Led by Abbassi Madani, and a charismatic Islamist young preacher, Ali Belhadj, it was influenced by Salafism and the jihad in Afghanistan, as well as the Muslim Brotherhood. Taking advantage of economic failure and unpopular social liberalization and secularization of the ruling leftist-nationalist FLN government, it used its preaching to advocate the establishment of a legal system following Sharia law, economic liberalization and development program, education in Arabic rather than French, and gender segregation, with women staying home to alleviate the high rate of unemployment among young Algerian men. The FIS won sweeping victories in local elections and was set to win national elections in 1991, when voting was canceled by a military coup d'état.

As Islamists took up arms to overthrow the government, the FIS's leaders were arrested and it became overshadowed by Islamist guerrilla groups, particularly the Islamic Salvation Army, MIA and Armed Islamic Group (or GIA). A bloody and devastating civil war ensued in which between 150,000 and 200,000 people were killed over the next decade.

The civil war was not a victory for Islamists. By 2002 the main guerrilla groups had either been destroyed or had surrendered. The popularity of Islamist parties has declined to the point that "the Islamist candidate, Abdallah Jaballah, came a distant third with 5% of the vote" in the 2004 presidential election.

== Bangladesh ==
Jamaat-e-Islami Bangladesh is the largest Islamist party in the country and supports the implementation of Sharia law and promotes the country's main right-wing politics. Since 2000, the main political opposition Bangladesh Nationalist Party (BNP) has been allied with it and another Islamic party, Islami Oikya Jote. Some of their leaders and supporters, including former ministers and MPs, have been hanged for alleged war crimes during Bangladesh's struggle for independence and speaking against the ruling Bangladesh Awami League.

== Belgium ==
In the 2012, the party named ISLAM had four candidates and they were elected in Molenbeek and Anderlecht. In 2018, they ran candidates in 28 municipalities. Its policies include schools must offer halal food and women must be able to wear a headscarf anywhere. Another of the Islam Party's goals is to separate men and women on public transportation. The party's president argues this policy will help protect women from sexual harassment.

== Denmark ==
The Islamist movements gradually grew since the 1990s. The first Islamist groups and networks were predominantly influenced by the countries they immigrated from. Those involved had close contact with militant Islamists in the Middle East, South Asia and North Africa. Their operations had supporting militant groups financially as their first priority. Since the 1990s, people from the Islamist movements joined several conflicts to train with or participate in fighting with Islamist militants.

In the 2000s the Islamist movements grew and by 2014 there were militants among the Islamist movements in Copenhagen, Aarhus and Odense. Several people from crime gangs join Islamist movements that sympathise with militant Islamism. The militant Islamist movement were estimated to encompass some hundreds in 2014.

The Danish National Centre for Social Research released a report commissioned by the Ministry of Children, Integration and Social Affairs documenting 15 extremist groups operating in Denmark. Most were non-Muslim far-right or far-left groups, but five were Sunni Islamist groups. These Sunni Islamist groups include Hizb ut-Tahrir Denmark, Dawah-bærere (Dawah Carriers), Kaldet til Islam (The Call to Islam), Dawah-centret (The Dawah Centre), and the Muslimsk Ungdomscenter (The Muslim Youth Centre). All of these Sunni Islamist groups operate in Greater Copenhagen with the exception of Muslimsk Ungdomscenter, which operates in Aarhus. Altogether, roughly 195 to 415 Muslims belong to one of these organizations and most are young men.

== Egypt (Jihadism) ==
While Qutb's ideas became increasingly radical during his imprisonment prior to his execution in 1966, the leadership of the Brotherhood, led by Hasan al-Hudaybi, remained moderate and interested in political negotiation and activism. Fringe or splinter movements inspired by the final writings of Qutb in the mid-1960s (particularly the manifesto Milestones, a.k.a. Ma'alim fi-l-Tariq) did, however, develop and they pursued a more radical direction. By the 1970s, the Brotherhood had renounced violence as a means of achieving its goals.

The path of violence and military struggle was then taken up by the Egyptian Islamic Jihad organization responsible for the assassination of Anwar Sadat in 1981. Unlike earlier anti-colonial movements the extremist group directed its attacks against what it believed were "apostate" leaders of Muslim states, leaders who held secular leanings or who had introduced or promoted Western/foreign ideas and practices into Islamic societies. Its views were outlined in a pamphlet written by Muhammad Abd al-Salaam Farag, in which he states:

...there is no doubt that the first battlefield for jihad is the extermination of these infidel leaders and to replace them by a complete Islamic Order...

Another of the Egyptian groups which employed violence in their struggle for Islamic order was al-Gama'a al-Islamiyya (Islamic Group). Victims of their campaign against the Egyptian state in the 1990s included the head of the counter-terrorism police (Major General Raouf Khayrat), a parliamentary speaker (Rifaat al-Mahgoub), dozens of European tourists and Egyptian bystanders, and over 100 Egyptian police. Ultimately the campaign to overthrow the government was unsuccessful, and the major jihadi group, Jamaa Islamiya (or al-Gama'a al-Islamiyya), renounced violence in 2003. Other lesser known groups include the Islamic Liberation Party, Salvation from Hell and Takfir wal-Hijra, and these groups have variously been involved in activities such as attempted assassinations of political figures, arson of video shops and attempted takeovers of government buildings.

== France ==
The Democratic Union of Muslims (French: Union des démocrates musulmans français, UDMF), a party founded in 2012, planned to take part in 2019 municipal elections. They presented candidate lists for 50 different cities. The UDMF also fielded candidates for European Parliament elections. The rise of the party can be attributed to French Muslim dissatisfaction with mainstream political parties.

Gérald Darmanin, Minister of the Interior of France, said in his book, Le séparatisme Islamiste, ‘Islamism, the most powerful ideology in the world, has deprived Islam of its voice.’

=== Law against Islamist extremism ===
After the murder of Paty, a bill was put forward to fight Islamist extremism and separatism to fight the roots of jihadist violence. It was approved by the National Assembly in February 2021.

A new bill was introduced, which makes it unlawful to threaten a public servant in order to gain an exception or special treatment which carries a penalty of up to five years in prison. The legislation expands the powers of authorities to close places of worship and religious organisations when they promote "hate or violence". The law requires religious funds from abroad exceeding €10,000 to be declared and the relevant accounts to be certified, so as to regulate the donations from countries such as Turkey, Qatar and Saudi Arabia. Millions of euros in funding had previously reached France from countries such as Turkey, Morocco and Saudi Arabia.

It provides stricter rules for allowing home-schooling in order to prevent parents taking children out of school in order to let them pursue their education in underground Islamist institutions. Doctors performing virginity tests would be subject to fines or prison sentences. These changes were prompted by a number of cases of Muslim men trying to have their marriages annulled by accusing their spouse of having had sex before marriage. Authorities will have to refuse residency documents to applicants who practise polygamy. Forced marriage, which The French ministry of the interior states affects 200,000 women in France, was likewise required to be combated with greater scrutiny from registrars.

=== Muslim Brotherhood in France ===
The brotherhood's build-up in France started with Union des organisations islamiques en France (UOIF) which later changed its name to Musulmans de France. The organization primarily consisted of foreign students who entered France from Tunisia and Morocco. By 2020, there were 147 mosques and 18 Islamic schools associated with the brotherhood. UOIF has about 50,000 members distributed among 200 member organizations.

The Brotherhood pursues a communitarianist philiosophy and works against Muslims adopting liberal lifestyles and becoming assimilated into French society. In the long term, they aim towards entering politics by increasing the number of Muslims until they can form a political party of their own.

In January 2026, the French National Assembly adopted a non-binding resolution calling on the European Union to assess whether the Muslim Brotherhood should be added to the EU's list of terrorist organisations. The resolution urged EU institutions to examine the movement's activities and networks in Europe, citing concerns about its ideological influence and alleged links to extremist currents. According to various sources, the vote reflected growing scrutiny in France of the Muslim Brotherhood's role in civil society and its perceived challenge to secular and republican values, while government officials emphasised that the measure did not amount to an immediate designation and that any EU-level decision would require a legal assessment and consensus among member states.

== Gaza (Hamas) ==
The Hamas flag

Hamas is a Palestinian Sunni Islamist organization that governs the Gaza Strip where it has moved to establish sharia law in matters such as separation of the genders, using the lash for punishment, and Islamic dress code. Hamas also has a military resistance wing, the Izz ad-Din al-Qassam Brigades.

For some decades prior to the First Palestine Intifada in 1987, the Muslim Brotherhood in Palestine took a "quiescent" stance towards Israel, focusing on preaching, education and social services, and benefiting from Israel's "indulgence" to build up a network of mosques and charitable organizations. As the First Intifada gathered momentum and Palestinian shopkeepers closed their shops in support of the uprising, the Brotherhood announced the formation of HAMAS ("zeal"), devoted to Jihad against Israel. Rather than being more moderate than the PLO, the 1988 Hamas charter took a more uncompromising stand, calling for the destruction of Israel and the establishment of an Islamic state in Palestine. It was soon competing with and then overtaking the PLO for control of the intifada. The Brotherhood's base of devout middle class found common cause with the impoverished youth of the intifada in their cultural conservatism and antipathy for activities of the secular middle class such as drinking alcohol and going about without hijab.

Hamas has continued to play a significant role in the Israeli-Palestinian conflict. From 2000 to 2007 it killed 542 people in 140 suicide bombing or "martyrdom operations". In the January 2006 legislative election—its first foray into the political process—it won the majority of the seats, and in 2007 it drove the PLO out of Gaza. Hamas has been praised by Muslims for driving Israel out of the Gaza Strip, but criticized for failure to achieve its demands in the 2008–09 and 2014 Gaza Wars despite heavy destruction and significant loss of life.

== Pakistan ==
Early in the history of the state of Pakistan (12 March 1949), a parliamentary resolution (the Objectives Resolution) was adopted in accordance with the vision of founding fathers of Pakistan (Muhammad Iqbal, Muhammad Ali Jinnah, Liaquat Ali Khan), proclaiming:

Sovereignty belongs to Allah alone but He has delegated it to the State of Pakistan through its people for being exercised within the limits prescribed by Him as a sacred trust.

- The State shall exercise its powers and authority through the elected representatives of the people.
- The principles of democracy, freedom, equality, tolerance and social justice, as enunciated by Islam, shall be fully observed.
- Muslims shall be enabled to order their lives in the individual and collective spheres in accordance with the teachings of Islam as set out in the Quran and Sunnah.
- Provision shall be made for the religious minorities to freely profess and practice their religions and develop their cultures.

This resolution later became a key source of inspiration for writers of the Constitution of Pakistan, and is included in the constitution as preamble.

In July 1977, General Zia-ul-Haq overthrew Prime Minister Zulfiqar Ali Bhutto's regime in Pakistan. Ali Bhutto, a leftist in democratic competition with Islamists, had announced banning alcohol and nightclubs within six months, shortly before he was overthrown. Zia-ul-Haq was much more committed to Islamism, and "Islamization" or implementation of Islamic law, became a cornerstone of his eleven-year military dictatorship and Islamism became his "official state ideology". Zia ul Haq was an admirer of Mawdudi and Mawdudi's party Jamaat-e-Islami became the "regime's ideological and political arm". In Pakistan this Islamization from above was "probably" more complete "than under any other regime except those in Iran and Sudan," but Zia-ul-Haq was also criticized by many Islamists for imposing "symbols" rather than substance, and using Islamization to legitimize his means of seizing power. Unlike neighboring Iran, Zia-ul-Haq's policies were intended to "avoid revolutionary excess", and not to strain relations with his American and Persian Gulf state allies. Zia-ul-Haq was killed in 1988 but Islamization remains an important element in Pakistani society.

== Sudan ==
For many years, Sudan had an Islamist regime under the leadership of Hassan al-Turabi. His National Islamic Front first gained influence when strongman General Gaafar al-Nimeiry invited members to serve in his government in 1979. Turabi built a powerful economic base with money from foreign Islamist banking systems, especially those linked with Saudi Arabia. He also recruited and built a cadre of influential loyalists by placing sympathetic students in the university and military academy while serving as minister of education.

After al-Nimeiry was overthrown in 1985 the party did poorly in national elections, but in 1989 it was able to overthrow the elected post-al-Nimeiry government with the help of the military. Turabi was noted for proclaiming his support for the democratic process and a liberal government before coming to power, but strict application of sharia law, torture and mass imprisonment of the opposition, and an intensification of the long-running war in southern Sudan, once in power. The NIF regime also harbored Osama bin Laden for a time (before 9/11), and worked to unify Islamist opposition to the American attack on Iraq in the 1991 Gulf War.

After Sudanese intelligence services were implicated in an assassination attempt on the president of Egypt, UN economic sanctions were imposed on Sudan, a poor country, and Turabi fell from favor. He was imprisoned for a time in 2004–05. Some of the NIF policies, such as the war with the non-Muslim south, have been reversed, though the National Islamic Front still holds considerable power in the government of Omar al-Bashir and National Congress Party, another Islamist party in country.

== Switzerland ==
Switzerland is not normally seen as a center of Islamism, especially when compared to countries such as Belgium or France. However, from 2012 to 2018, the majority of the country's jihadist and would-be jihadist population were radicalized in Switzerland.

== Turkey ==
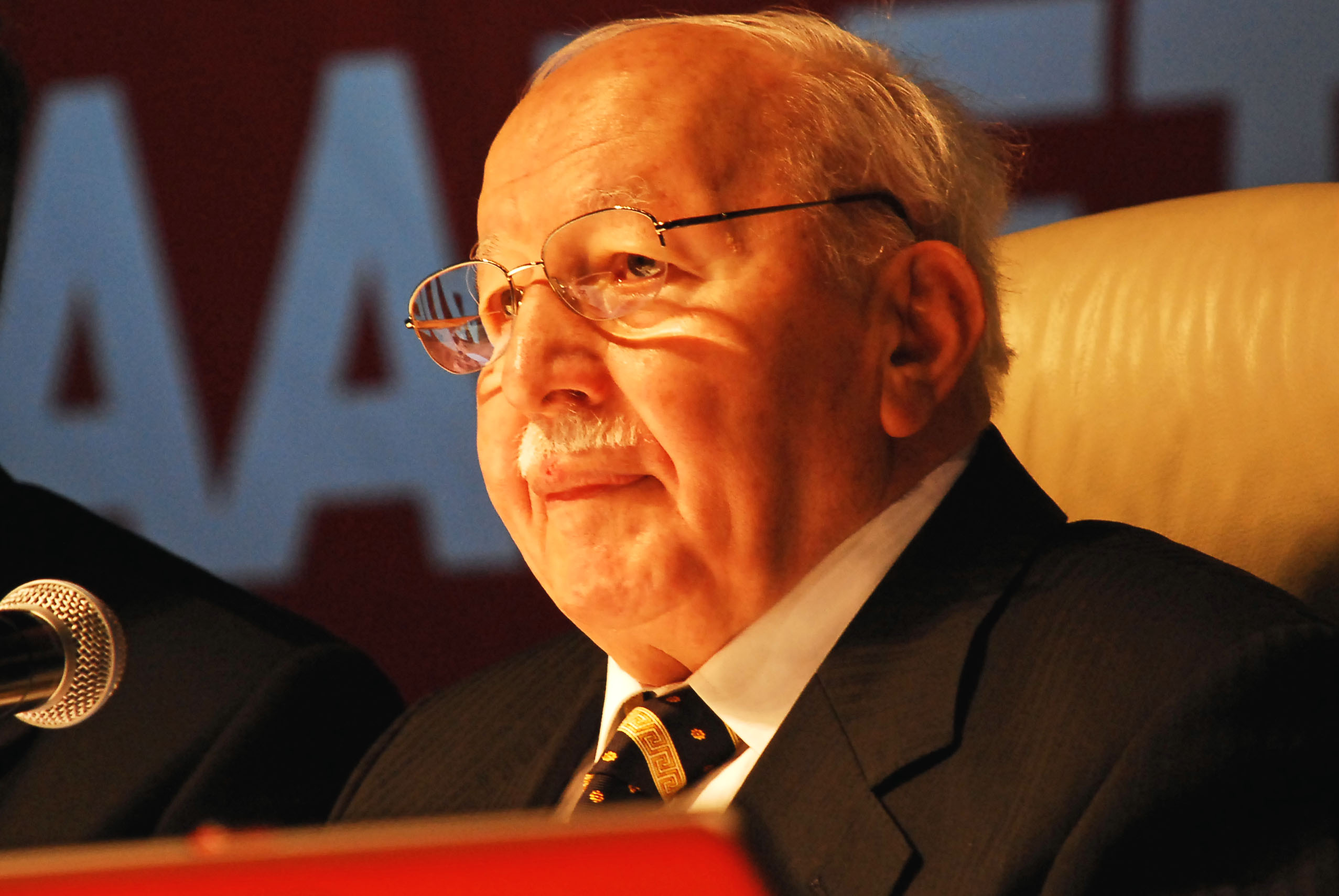
Necmettin Erbakan, elected in 1996, was the second Islamist Prime Minister of Turkey after Şemsettin Günaltay, but was removed from power by a "postmodern coup d'état" in 1997.

Turkey had a number of Islamist parties, often changing names as they were banned by the constitutional court for anti-secular activities. Necmettin Erbakan (1926–2011) was the leader of several of the parties, the National Order Party (Milli Nizam Partisi, 1970–1971), the National Salvation Party (Milli Selamet Partisi, 1972–1981), and the Welfare Party (Refah Partisi, 1983–1998); he also became a member of the Felicity Party (Saadet Partisi, 2003–2011). Current Turkish President Recep Tayyip Erdoğan has long been considered a champion of political Islam. The Justice and Development Party (AKP), which has dominated Turkish politics since 2002, is sometimes described as Islamist, but rejects such classification. Under Erdoğan's rule, Islamists split between Kurdish Islamists and Turkish Islamists.

Political scientist Umut Özkırımlı has characterized Erdoğan's Turkey as an "unabashedly Islamist regime", though also arguing that its authoritarian and anti-pluralist political system shows continuity with earlier traditions of Turkish state-building.

== Contemporary era ==
=== By country ===
- Various Islamist political groups are dominant forces in the political systems of Afghanistan, Iran, Iraq and the Palestinian territories.
- The Green Algeria Alliance is an Islamist coalition of political parties, created for the legislative election of 2012 in Algeria. It includes the Movement of Society for Peace (Hamas), Islamic Renaissance Movement (Ennahda) and the Movement for National Reform (Islah). The alliance is led by Bouguerra Soltani of Hamas. However, the incumbent coalition, comprising the FLN of President Abdelaziz Bouteflika and the RND of Prime Minister Ahmed Ouyahia, held on to power after winning a majority of seats, and the Islamist parties of the Green Algeria Alliance lost seats in the legislative election of 2012.
- Shia Islamist Al Wefaq, Salafi Islamist Al Asalah and Ikhwani(brotherhood) Islamist Al-Menbar Islamic Society are dominant democratic forces in Bahrain.
- In Indonesia, Prosperous Justice Party is an Islamist political party in the country's democratic process. The Islamic Defenders Front, which was disbanded in 2020, was a prominent Indonesian Islamist organization.
- Islamic Action Front is Jordan's Islamist political party and largest democratic political force in the country. The IAF's survival in Jordan is primarily due to its flexibility and less radical approach to politics.
- Hadas or "Islamic Constitutional Movement" is Kuwait's Sunni Islamist party.
- Islamic Group (Lebanon) is a Sunni Islamist political party in Lebanon. Hezbollah is a Shia Islamist political party in Lebanon.
- The Justice and Construction Party is the Muslim Brotherhood's political arm in Libya and the second largest political force in the country. The National Forces Alliance, the largest political group in country, does not believe the country should be run entirely by Sharia law or secular law, but does hold that Sharia should be "the main inspiration for legislation." Party leader Jibril has said the NFA is a moderate Islamic movement that recognises the importance of Islam in political life and favours Sharia as the basis of the law.
- The Pan-Malaysian Islamic Party is a major opposition party in Malaysia which espouses Islamism.
- The Justice and Development Party (Morocco) is the ruling party in Morocco since 29 November 2011, advocating Islamism and Islamic democracy.
- The Muslim Brotherhood of Syria is a Sunni Islamist force in Syria and very loosely affiliated to the Egyptian Muslim Brotherhood. It has also been called the "dominant group" or "dominant force" in the Arab Spring uprising in Syria. The group's stated political positions are moderate and in its most recent April 2012 manifesto it "pledges to respect individual rights", to promote pluralism and democracy.
- The Islamic Renaissance Party of Tajikistan is Tajikistan's Islamist party and the only legal Islamist party in formerly Soviet Central Asia.
- The Ennahda Movement, also known as Renaissance Party or simply Ennahda, is a moderate Islamist political party in Tunisia. On 1 March 2011, after the government of Zine El Abidine Ben Ali collapsed in the wake of the 2011 Tunisian revolution, Tunisia's interim government granted the group permission to form a political party. Since then it has become the biggest and most well-organized party in Tunisia, so far outdistancing its more secular competitors. In the Tunisian Constituent Assembly election of 2011, the first honest election in the country's history with a turnout of 51% of all eligible voters, the party won 37% of the popular vote and 89 (41%) of the 217 assembly seats, far more than any other party.
- Eastern Africa has become a hotbed of violent Islamic extremism since the late 1990s, one of the relevant movements being al-Shabaab, based in Somalia, which emerged in response to the 2006–09 Ethiopian intervention in Somalia.
- West Africa has seen the rise of influential Islamic extremist organizations, notably Boko Haram in Northern Nigeria and al-Qaeda in the Islamic Maghreb in Mali.

=== Hizb ut-Tahrir ===
Hizb ut-Tahrir is an influential international Islamist movement, founded in 1953 by an Islamic Qadi (judge) Taqiuddin al-Nabhani. HT is unique from most other Islamist movements in that the party focuses not on implementation of Sharia on local level or on providing social services, but on unifying the Muslim world under its vision of a new Islamic caliphate spanning from North Africa and the Middle East to much of central and South Asia.

To this end it has drawn up and published a 186-article constitution for its proposed caliphate-state specifying specific policies such as sharia law, a "unitary ruling system" headed by a caliph elected by Muslims, an economy based on the gold standard, public ownership of utilities, public transport, and energy resources, death for apostates and Arabic as the "sole language of the State."

In its focus on the Caliphate, the party takes a different view of Muslim history than some other Islamists such as Muhammad Qutb. HT sees Islam's pivotal turning point as occurring not with the death of Ali, or one of the other four "rightly guided" caliphs in the 7th century, but with the abolition of the Ottoman Caliphate in 1924. This is believed to have ended the true Islamic system, something for which it blames "the disbelieving (Kafir) colonial powers" working through Turkish modernist Mustafa Kemal Atatürk.

HT does not engage in armed jihad or work for a democratic system, but works to take power through "ideological struggle" to change Muslim public opinion, and in particular through elites who will "facilitate" a "change of the government," i.e., launch a "bloodless" coup. It allegedly attempted and failed such coups in 1968 and 1969 in Jordan, and in 1974 in Egypt, and is now banned in both countries.

The party is sometimes described as "Leninist" and "rigidly controlled by its central leadership," with its estimated one million members required to spend "at least two years studying party literature under the guidance of mentors (Murshid)" before taking "the party oath." HT is particularly active in the ex-soviet republics of Central Asia and in Europe.

=== Post-Arab Spring (2011–present) ===
One observer (Quinn Mecham) notes four trends in Islamism rising from the Arab Spring of 2010–11:

- The repression of the Muslim Brotherhood. Primarily by the Egyptian military and courts following the forcible removal of Morsi from office in 2013; but also by Saudi Arabia and a number of Gulf countries (not Qatar).
- Rise of Islamist "state-building" where "state failure" has taken place—most prominently in Syria, Iraq, Libya and Yemen. Islamists have found it easier than competing non-Islamists trying to fill the void of state failure, by securing external funding, weaponry and fighters—"many of which have come from abroad and have rallied around a pan-Islamic identity". The norms of governance in these Islamist areas are militia-based, and the population submit to their authority out of fear, loyalty, other reasons, or some combination. The "most expansive" of these new "models" is the Islamic State.
- Increasing sectarianism at least in part from proxy wars. Fighters are proxies primarily for Saudi Arabia and the Gulf states and for Iran. Islamists are fighting Islamists across sectarian lines in Lebanon (Sunni militants targeting Hezbollah positions), Yemen (between mainstream Sunni Islamists of Islah and the Shiite Zaydi Houthi movement), in Iraq (Islamic State and Iraqi Shiite militias)
- Increased caution and political learning in countries such as Algeria and Jordan where Islamist have chosen not to lead a major challenge against their governments. In Yemen Islah "has sought to frame its ideology in a way that will avoid charges of militancy".

Another observer (Tarek Osman) notes with concern that

- the failure to take power during the Arab Spring has led not to "soul-searching" in major Islamist groups about what went wrong, but instead to "antagonism and fiery anger" and a thirst for revenge. Partisans of political Islam (although this does not include some prominent leaders such as Rached Ghannouchi but is particularly true in Egypt) see themselves as victims of an injustice whose perpetrators are not just "individual conspirators but entire social groups".

=== Islamic State ===
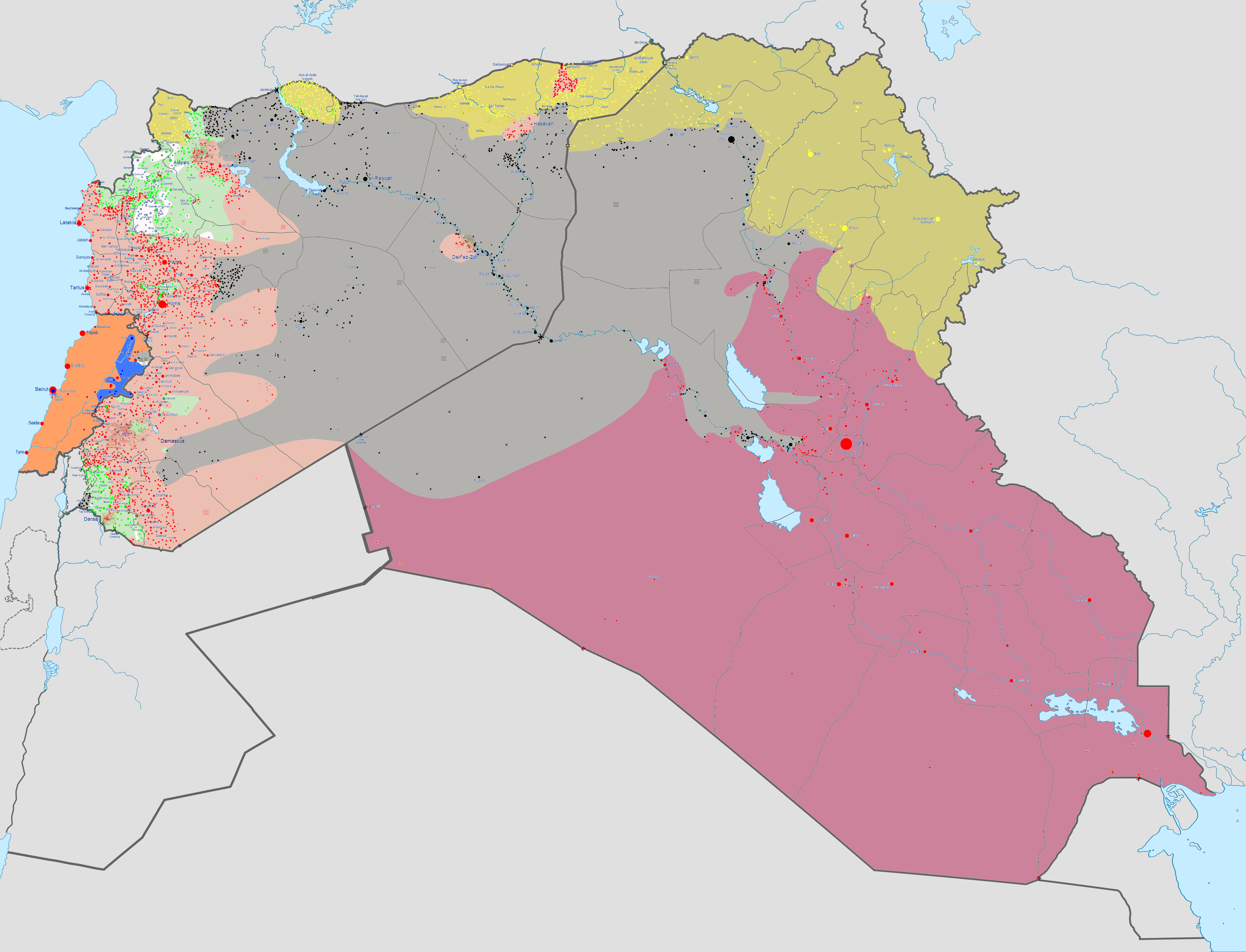
ISIL's territory, in grey, at the time of its greatest territorial extent in May 2015

"The Islamic State", formerly known as the "Islamic State of Iraq and the Levant" and before that the "Islamic State of Iraq", (also called by the Arabic acronym Daesh), is a Wahhabi/Salafi jihadist extremist militant group which is led by and mainly composed of Sunni Arabs from Syria and Iraq. In 2014, the group proclaimed itself a caliphate, with religious, political and military authority over all Muslims worldwide. As of March 2015, it had control over territory occupied by ten million people in Syria and Iraq, and has nominal control over small areas of Libya, Nigeria, and Afghanistan. (While a self-described state, it lacks international recognition.) ISIL also operates or has affiliates in other parts of the world, including North Africa and South Asia

Originating as the Jama'at al-Tawhid wal-Jihad in 1999, ISIL pledged allegiance to al-Qaeda in 2004, participated in the Iraqi insurgency that followed the invasion of Iraq by Western coalition forces in 2003, joined the fight in the Syrian Civil War beginning in 2011, and was expelled from al-Qaeda in early 2014, (which complained of its failure to consult and "notorious intransigence"). ISIL gained prominence after it drove Iraqi government forces out of key cities in western Iraq in an offensive in June that same year. The group is adept at social media, posting Internet videos of beheadings of soldiers, civilians, journalists and aid workers, and is known for its destruction of cultural heritage sites. The United Nations (UN) has held ISIL responsible for human rights abuses and war crimes, and Amnesty International has reported ethnic cleansing by the group on a "historic scale". The group has been designated a terrorist organisation by the UN, the European Union (EU) and member states, the United States, India, Indonesia, Turkey, Saudi Arabia, Syria and other countries.

== See also ==
- Anti-Western sentiment
- Anti-Zionism
- Islamist Shi'ism
- Clash of Civilizations
- Clerical fascism
- Dominionism
- Islamicism (disambiguation)
- Islamofascism
