= Islamicist =

Islamicist may refer to:

- Expert or scholar in Islamic studies
- (incorrectly) Islamic fundamentalist

== See also ==
- Islam (disambiguation)
- Islamicism (disambiguation)
- Muslimist (disambiguation)
