= Yugoslav Muslims =

The term Yugoslav Muslims may refer to

- Yugoslav Muslims in terms of ethnicity: south-Slavic Muslims in former Yugoslavia
- in terms of religion: all adherents of Islam in former Yugoslavia
- in terms of political history: members of Yugoslav Muslim Organization (1919–1941)

== See also ==
- Muslims (disambiguation)
