= Caesar E. Farah =

Professor of history at the University of Minnesota (1929-2009)

- Born: March 13, 1929; Portland, Oregon, U.S.
- Died: November 26, 2009 (aged 80)

Education
- Education: Stanford University (BA); Princeton University (MA, PhD)

Philosophical work
- Era: Modern era
- Region: Islamic studies

Caesar E. Farah (March 13, 1929 – November 26, 2009) was a professor of history at the University of Minnesota.

Farah was born in Portland, Oregon, and received a B.A. (1952) from Stanford University, before then studying at Princeton University, where he received an M.A. (1955) and Ph.D. (1957). After serving as a cultural affairs officer in New Delhi and Karachi, he began his teaching career at Portland State College from 1959 to 1963, teaching history and Near Eastern languages. From 1963 to 1964, Farah taught at Los Angeles State College, and then became Associate Professor of Near Eastern Language and Literature at Indiana University in Bloomington, 1964–1969. He joined the faculty of the University of Minnesota as Professor of Middle Eastern Studies in 1969, and remained there until his retirement in 2008.

== Works ==
- The Eternal Message of Muhammad Dec 28, 1993
- An Arab's Journey to Colonial Spanish America: The Travels of Elias Al-Musili in the Seventeenth Century Nov 2003
- The Sultan's Yemen: 19th-Century Challenges to Ottoman Rule Jun 29, 2002
- Islam: Beliefs and Observances
- Arabs and Young Turks: Ottomanism, Arabian and Islamism in the Ottoman Empire 1908-1918 Jun 22, 1998
- Modernization in the Middle East: The Ottoman Empire and Its Afro-Asian Successors
- Islam Jan 2000
- A guide to current research on Yemen 1987
- The dhayl in medieval Arabic historiography 1967
