= The Muslim Brotherhood: Evolution of an Islamist Movement =

2013 book by Carrie Rosefsky Wickham

The Muslim Brotherhood: Evolution of an Islamist Movement - Updated Edition
- Author: Carrie Rosefsky Wickham
- Language: English
- Subject: Politics, Middle Eastern studies, Islamist Movements, the Muslim Brotherhood
- Genre: Non-fiction
- Publisher: Princeton University Press
- Publication date: 2013, 2015 (Updated Edition)
- Pages: 424
- ISBN: 9780691163642 Updated Edition
- Preceded by: Mobilizing Islam: Religion, Activism, and Political Change in Egypt (2002)

The Muslim Brotherhood: Evolution of an Islamist Movement is a book by American political scientist Carrie Rosefsky Wickham that delves into the history and evolution of the Muslim Brotherhood in Egypt. First published in 2013, then republished as an updated edition in 2015 following the Arab Spring, the book examines the organization's development from its founding in 1928 through its significant political involvement during the 2011-2012 elections, leading to the rise and subsequent fall of the Brotherhood's government under President Muhammad Morsi. Wickham's research is based on over one hundred in-depth interviews and previously inaccessible Arabic-language sources. The book offers insights into the broader implications of the Brotherhood's trajectory for democratic governance, peace, and stability in the Arab world, with a new afterword that discusses the events following Morsi's ouster.

== Overview ==
Wickham explores the history of the Muslim Brotherhood and its political and ideological transformations in Egypt. The book traces the Brotherhood's journey from its inception in 1928, highlighting how it navigated various political landscapes, including periods of repression and brief political empowerment. Drawing on extensive fieldwork and a variety of primary sources, Wickham argues that the changes in the Brotherhood's strategies and ideologies are not merely reactive to external pressures but are also influenced by internal debates and evolving worldviews between three groups within the movement—reformers, pragmatists, and conservatives.

The book examines the period starting from the 1980s, a time when the Brotherhood began participating in Egyptian parliamentary elections as well as elections for seats on the boards of national professional associations. The author explores how this engagement with the broader political environment influenced both individual members and the organization as a whole.

Wickham's analysis is also focused on the Brotherhood's role during pivotal moments of Egypt's modern history, such as its engagement in electoral politics, its response to the Wasat Party initiative, and its vacillation between self-assertion and self-restraint. The book culminates in a discussion of the Brotherhood's involvement in the 2011-2012 elections, which led to the ascension of Muhammad Morsi, a senior figure in the group, as Egypt’s first democratically elected president.

In nine chapters, the book covers the Muslim Brotherhood's history, including its early years, electoral involvement, internal ideological debates, responses to political challenges, role in the Egyptian uprising, and broader impact on the landscape of Egyptian politics. Further, in a comparative section, the book highlights key similarities and differences in the trajectories of contemporary Islamist groups in Egypt, Morocco, Jordan and Kuwait.

=== Afterword to updated edition ===
The book initially went to press when the Muslim Brotherhood was at the zenith of its power, with Muhammad Mursi as Egypt's president. However, within just a year, the Brotherhood's influence crumbled as millions protested against Mursi's rule, leading to a military coup on July 3, 2013. The updated edition concludes with a new afterword where Wickham reflects on the Brotherhood's decline after Morsi's ouster and the broader implications for Islamist movements in the region. In 36 pages, the author examines the rapid rise and fall of the Muslim Brotherhood in Egypt, focusing particularly on the period during and after Muhammad Mursi's presidency. She shows that after Mursi's removal, the Brotherhood faced severe repression reminiscent of the Nasser era, including mass arrests, the shutdown of its media outlets, and the designation of the Brotherhood as a terrorist organization by December 2013.

Wickham’s analysis highlights the complex factors which contributed to the Brotherhood's downfall, noting both internal missteps and external pressures. On one hand, the Brotherhood is criticized for overreaching and failing to govern inclusively. Despite Mursi's promises to be the "president of all Egyptians," his administration was marked by actions that alienated secular opposition groups, such as the appointment of Islamist figures to key state positions and pushing through a controversial constitution. The Brotherhood's strategy is described as one of "self-assertion," where they sought to maximize their influence quickly after their electoral victories, which ultimately backfired as it fueled fears of authoritarianism.

On the other hand, the Brotherhood's fall is also attributed to the entrenched power of the "deep state," which includes the military, judiciary, and security forces loyal to the old Mubarak regime. These groups, the author suggests, were deeply hostile to the Brotherhood and actively worked to undermine its rule, leading to a situation where Mursi and his administration were increasingly isolated and unable to effectively govern.

In the aftermath of Mursi's ouster, the Brotherhood adopted a strategy of nonviolent resistance, rallying around the concept of "shaʾariya" or constitutional legitimacy. The group has framed its struggle as a defense of democracy, though this stance is complicated by the Brotherhood's own ambiguous relationship with democratic principles, especially regarding issues like pluralism and civil rights.

The afterword also discusses the ongoing debate within the Brotherhood about the causes of their downfall, with some members beginning to acknowledge their mistakes. This internal reflection could lead to changes in the group's strategies and goals in the future. The author notes that while the Brotherhood's official rhetoric remains one of defiance, there are also some signs of an emerging trend towards reconciliation and a willingness to engage in dialogue with other political forces in Egypt.

== Reviews ==
Raymond William Baker praised the book as an excellent resource for understanding the Muslim Brotherhood's role in Egypt's political landscape. He noted that despite the book's coverage ending with Mohamed Morsi's election in 2012, the subsequent events have only increased its relevance. Baker highlighted Wickham's nuanced portrayal of the Brotherhood, particularly her debunking of the idea that it is a "monolithic bloc with a fixed trajectory." He also pointed out that while the book had some limitations, such as a liberal bias, its overall contribution to the subject was significant.

Dalal Daoud noted that Wickham's work effectively traced the group's strategic responses and ideological shifts over time, emphasizing how the Brotherhood has adopted more liberal interpretations of Islam. However, Daoud critiqued the book for not fully considering the influence of Egypt's rural conservatism on the Brotherhood's ideology, stating that "the rural element of the Muslim Brotherhood has influenced many of its positions, including the group’s position on women’s role in society." Despite this critique, Daoud acknowledged the book as a valuable contribution to the study of Islamist movements.

Angela Joya highlighted the author's in-depth detailed approach, which she said "dispels simplistic boxing of the Brotherhood into moderate or radical" and instead offers a complex portrayal of the group's evolution within Egypt's changing political and social landscape. She noted that the book forces readers to reconsider common generalizations about Islamic movements, making it a significant contribution to Middle Eastern studies.

Tarek Masoud praised Wickham's nuanced analysis of the Muslim Brotherhood, highlighting her argument that the group cannot simply be categorized as "for" or "against" democracy, nor as "moderate" or "extremist." Masoud commended Wickham for demonstrating that the Brotherhood, like any large collective, contained diverse viewpoints, with some members embracing reform and others clinging to older habits of mind and behavior. He noted Wickham's significant contribution to understanding ideological change within political movements, stating, "Wickham’s account of the dynamics and scope of the Brotherhood’s changes is of undeniable importance."

In her review, Brooke Sherrard praised the book for its examination of the Muslim Brotherhood's development. Sherrard applauded Wickham's avoidance of oversimplifications, emphasizing that labeling the group with terms like "radical" or "moderate" "does violence to its complexity." She said the book provides the tools to foster more sophisticated discussions of Islamism and more generally, to analyze the internal dynamics of political organizations.

However, Sherrard noted that a chapter on Muslim Brotherhood organizations in Jordan, Kuwait, and Morocco felt somewhat out of place in the overall narrative. She suggested that this might have been due to the book being in progress when the Arab Spring occurred. Despite this, Sherrard acknowledged that the chapter still contributed valuable insights into the internal divisions and debates within these movements, adding layers of complexity to Wickham’s broader arguments.

Joshua Sinai's review of the book was largely positive, acknowledging the book as an important and authoritative study on the evolution and influence of the Muslim Brotherhood. Sinai highlighted Wickham's extensive research, which included over 100 in-depth interviews and utilization of numerous Arabic language sources. He praised the book for systematically tracing the Brotherhood's evolution in Egypt from its founding in 1928 to its electoral victories in 2011-2012, as well as comparing its trajectory with similar Islamist movements in other Middle Eastern countries.

Joshua Stacher agreed with Wickham's argument that ideational development within the Brotherhood is influenced by the social environment in which its members operate. She divides the group into reformers, pragmatists, and conservatives, arguing that the group's ideological shifts are more complex than previously thought. However, Stacher criticized the book for overemphasizing the reformists at the expense of other factions within the Brotherhood. He also pointed out that the book's focus is heavily on Egypt, with less attention given to other countries where the Brotherhood operates. Further attention to groups outside Egypt, he suggests, might have enriched the book’s overall theoretical findings.

Lorenzo Vidino stressed Wickham's balanced approach in addressing the complexities surrounding the topic, particularly the debate on whether participation in the political system leads to the moderation of Islamist groups. He also lauded the author for avoiding a polarized view and instead providing an evidence-based analysis that considers the nuanced evolution of Islamist groups, particularly the Egyptian Muslim Brotherhood. Vidino said that while the book's research largely predates the overthrow of Mohammed Mursi, it remains a valuable resource for understanding the possible future directions of the Brotherhood. He wrote:

Wickham’s research seems therefore to show that the truth is somewhere in between. Islamist groups have changed in a direction that could be seen as more ‘moderate’ over time, but some of that change is not entirely genuine.

John Waterbury considered the work as an extensive study of the Muslim Brotherhood, noting that Wickham has researched the group for over 20 years and has conducted interviews with nearly all of its leaders. Waterbury pointed out that although the author suggests that political participation might lead to moderation among Islamists, there is also evidence that state repression can have a similar effect. This nuanced view is further supported by examples from other countries like Morocco, Syria, and Turkey, where Islamist groups have moderated their stances in response to repression.

Lawrence Ziring said the work is meticulous and penetrating. Ziring highlighted Wickham's fluency in Arabic and her ability to shed new light on the Brotherhood's internal struggles, its influence across the Arab world, and its position as a significant political force in Egypt. The reviewer liked the balanced portrayal of the Brotherhood's complex relationship with the Egyptian military and its ongoing struggle to define Egypt's future between secularism and religious governance.

Barbara Zollner emphasized that the book offers a particularly valuable analysis of the Brotherhood's political decisions, challenges, and failures, especially during the period surrounding Egypt's Arab Spring and the subsequent rise and fall of the Brotherhood in power. Zollner also discussed Wickham's challenge to the "participation-moderation" thesis, which argues that political participation directly leads to moderation. Instead, Wickham suggests that religious beliefs can limit political reform.

== Awards and honors ==
- Honorable Mention in the Hubert Morken Award for Best Book (2015).
- Choice's Outstanding Academic Titles (2014).
- The Middle East Channel’s Top Five Books (2013)
