= Müslüm Aydoğan =

Turkish footballer (born 1989)

Personal information
- Date of birth: 12 April 1989 (age 37)
- Place of birth: İzmir, Turkey
- Height: 1.91 m (6 ft 3 in)
- Position: Centre back

Team information
- Current team: Kumluca Belediyespor

Youth career
- Fenerbahçe
- Güngörenspor
- Bahcelievler Olimpikspor
- İstanbulspor

Senior career*
Years	Team	Apps	(Gls)
2007–2013	İstanbulspor	159	(6)
2013–2014	Bandırmaspor	9	(0)
2013–2014	→ Darıca GB (loan)	16	(0)
2014–2015	Kırklarelispor	30	(2)
2015–2016	Kastamonuspor	33	(2)
2016–2017	Dumlupınar TSK	15	(0)
2016–2017	İstanbulspor	0	(0)
2017–2018	24 Erzincanspor	14	(1)
2017–2020	Kırklarelispor	61	(3)
2020–2021	Zonguldak Kömürspor	1	(0)
2021–2022	Maltepespor	4	(0)
2022–2023	Yatağanspor	21	(1)
2023–2024	Keşanspor	21	(0)
2024–2026	Kumluca Belediyespor	46	(0)
2026–2027	Keşanspor	4	(0)

International career
2008	Turkey U19	5	(0)
- * Club domestic league appearances and goals as of 01:34, 4 December 2025 (UTC)

Müslüm Aydoğan (born 12 April 1989) is a Turkish footballer who plays as a centre-back for Keşanspor.
