= Islamicism =

Islamicism may refer to:

- Islamic studies
- Islamic fundamentalism

== See also ==
- Islam (disambiguation)
- Islamicist (disambiguation)
- Muslimism (disambiguation)
