= Islam: Beliefs and Observances =

Islam: Beliefs and Observances is a contemporary book about Islam by Islamic scholar Caesar E. Farah.

== Introduction ==
The book talks about the timely study that encompasses the history of a worldwide religion, starting with its Arabian prophet Muhammad and going on to describe Islam as it is today. The book also gives detailed information on most military sects and their power centers in countries such as Iraq, Pakistan, Iran and Indonesia among others. The book also describes the policies and acts of Western nations that have contributed to antagonism and strategies being developed by the United States and its allies toward the Islamic world in general and terrorism in particular.

The book explains the Quran (Islam's Holy Book) and describes Islamic theology which points out many connections with Judaism and Christianity. The book also describes the core beliefs of Islam and their obligations as they apply to each believer and talks about religion's several sects. The book talks about how Islam's history is broken down according to the countries where it exists as a major political and social force. The text of the book is supplemented with end notes, a comprehensive glossary, a bibliography and an index.

== Excerpts of the book ==
In pages 219-220 of the book, talks about the literature of the Sufis and how it is rich and revealing of mystical search for God. The book also talks about Islam Sufis have left behind endowed body of devotional literature that is enough to evoke the envy of all those who have dedicated themselves to the worship of God. The book also talks about the influence of Sufis in the Sufi world which was persistent, albeit circumscribed.

In pages 242-249 of the book, it talks about the political dislocations resulting from the Crusades and the split of the Abbasid empire at the hands of the Mongols, the rises of multiple dynasties and the disappearance of the caliphate. The deterioration of commerce and other sources of wealth, the stepped up incursions of Turkic and Tartar invaders which contributed to the widespread spirit of uncertainty.

In pages 273–274, the book talks about Islam in America. According to the book, Muslim immigrants from Arab countries, India, Malaysia, Yugoslavia and Albania form small locations mostly in the larger cities although sometimes, it is common to find them in smaller cities as well.

== Reception ==
Writing for the Journal of the American Oriental Society, Alford T. Welch said, "the author's lucid style is to be commended" but lamented how "careless wording has resulted in erroneous statements". The writer William J. Saal thought that the book's overview of "Islam's commandmants" in the Quran's was "an interesting survey" but said that Islam lacks a set of moral principles analogous to the Bible's Ten Commandments. Anwar G. Chejne stated in the Journal of Asian History that although the book has "an overabundance of Arabic technical terms which could have been avoided", "the work has great value and merits the attention of the student of Islam and the general reader".

== See also ==
- List of Sunni books
- List of Shi'a books
