= Islam (disambiguation) =

Islam is an Abrahamic, monotheistic religion. Muslims are those who adhere to that religion. Islam may also refer to:

- Islam (name), surname or male given name

== Film and television ==
- Islam: Empire of Faith, 2000 TV documentary series
- Islam: The Untold Story, 2012 documentary film
- Islam: What the West Needs to Know, 2006 documentary film

== Books ==
- Islam: A Short History, 2000 book by Karen Armstrong
- Islam: Beliefs and Observances, book by Caesar E. Farah
- Islam: Beliefs and Teachings, book by Ghulam Sarwar
- Islam: Past, Present and Future, 2007 book by Hans Küng
- Islam: The Straight Path, 1988 book by John L. Esposito

== Places ==
- Islam Latinski, village in Croatia
- Islam Grčki, village in Croatia

== Other ==
- ISLAM (Belgian political party), a Belgian Islamist political party
