= Muğancıq Mehrab =

Mughanjyg Mehrab
- Municipality
- Azerbaijani: Muğancıq Mehrab
- Location within Azerbaijan
- Coordinates: 39°34′02″N 45°00′15″E
- Country: Azerbaijan
- Autonomous republic: Nakhchivan
- District: Sharur

Population (2005)
  - Total: 623
- Time zone: UTC+4 (AZT)

Muğancıq Mehrab (also Mughanjyg Mehrab) is a municipality and village in the Sharur District of Nakhchivan, Azerbaijan. It is located near the Nakhchivan-Sadarak highway, 1.5 km away from the district center, on the plain. Its population is engaged with beet-growing, vegetable-growing and farming. There is a secondary school, a library, a club and a medical center in the village. It has a population of 623.

== Etymology ==
Settlement was formed as a result of the settling of families belonging to the Iranian Mugh مغ (Magi) priestly tribe under the leadership of a person called Mehrab مهراب. The mughancıq means "small Magi, a small group of Magi".
