= Muğancıq Müslüm =

Mughanjyg Muslum
- Municipality
- Azerbaijani: Muğancıq Müslüm
- Location within Azerbaijan
- Coordinates: 39°33′N 45°01′E
- Country: Azerbaijan
- Autonomous republic: Nakhchivan
- District: Sharur

Population (2005)
  - Total: 749
- Time zone: UTC+4 (AZT)

Muğancıq Müslüm (also, Mughanjyg Muslum and Mughanjyg-Muslum) is a village and municipality in the Sharur District of Nakhchivan, Azerbaijan. It is located in the near of the Nakhchivan-Sadarak highway, on the plain. Its population engages in growing tobaccoand vegetable, hunting, and animal husbandry. There are secondary school, library, club and a medical center in the village. It has a population of 749.

== Etymology ==
Place of residence was formed as a result of the settling the families belonging to the muğanlı (mughanly) tribe under the leadership of a person named Muslum. The name means "muğanlılar belonging to Muslum" or "a piece from muğanlılar which belongs to Muslum".
