= Muslim Khan (politician) =

Indian politician

Member of Uttar Pradesh Legislative Assembly
- In office 2007–2012
- Constituency: Dataganj

Personal details
- Party: Bahujan Samaj Party

Muslim Khan was a member of the Bahujan Samaj Party and the Uttar Pradesh Legislative Assembly, 15th assembly of Dataganj (Assembly constituency) City of Usehat (in office 2007).
