= Muslim (disambiguation) =

Muslims (Arabic: مُسْلِم) are adherents of Islam, an Abrahamic monotheistic religion.

Muslim may also refer to:

- Muslims (ethnic group), a Slavic nationality within former Yugoslavia
- Muslim (name), a male name
- Muslim Quarter (Jerusalem), one of the four quarters of the ancient, walled Old City of Jerusalem
- Muslim FC, Pakistani football club
- A Moslem, 1995 Russian drama film directed by Vladimir Khotinenko
- The Muslim Weekly, a Muslim newspaper published in London
- Muslimah, a defunct Indonesian magazine

== See also ==
- Muslin, a cotton fabric of plain weave
