= Qutbism =

Sunni Islamist ideology developed by Sayyid Qutb

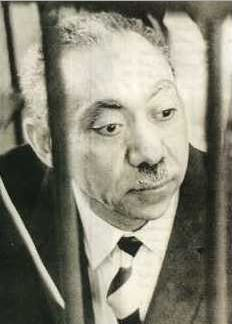
Sayyid Qutb, after whom Qutbism is named

Qutbism (Note: Arabic: ٱلْقُطْبِيَّةِ, romanized: al-Quṭbīyya) is an ideology that advocates Islamic extremist violence in order to establish an Islamic government, in addition to promoting offensive Jihad. Qutbism has been characterized as an Islamic terrorist ideology. Qutbism is also an exonym that refers to the Sunni Islamist beliefs and ideology of Sayyid Qutb, a leading Islamist revolutionary of the Muslim Brotherhood who was executed by the Egyptian government of Gamal Abdel Nasser in 1966. Sayyid Qutb's ideology was influenced by the doctrines of earlier Islamists like Hasan al-Banna and Maududi.

Sayyid Qutb's treatises deeply influenced numerous jihadist ideologues and organizations across the Muslim world. Qutbism has gained prominence due to its influence on notable Jihadist figures of contemporary era such as Abdullah Azzam, Osama bin Laden, Ayman al-Zawahiri, and Saif al-Adel. Its ideas have also been adopted by the Salafi-jihadist militant organization Islamic State (ISIL). It was one inspiration that influenced Ruhollah Khomeini in the development of his own ideology, Khomeinism.

Qutbist literature has been a major source of influence on numerous jihadist movements and organizations that have emerged since the 1970s. These include the Egyptian Islamic Jihad, al-Jama'ah al-Islamiyya, al-Takfir wal-Hijra, the Armed Islamic Group of Algeria (GIA), the Libyan Islamic Fighting Group (LIFG), al-Qaeda, al-Nusra Front, and the Islamic State (ISIL), and others that have sought to implement their strategy of waging offensive Jihad.

== Terminology ==
While adherents of Qutbism are referred to as Qutbists or Qutbiyyun (singular: Qutbi), they rarely refer to themselves with these names (i.e. the word is not an endonym); the name was first and still is used by the sect's opponents (i.e. it is an exonym).

== Tenets ==
The main tenet of the Qutbist ideology is that modern Muslims abandoned true Islam centuries ago, having instead reverted to jahiliyyah. Adherents believe that Islam must be re-established by Qutb's followers.

Qutb outlined his religious and political ideas in his book Ma'alim fi-l-Tariq ("Milestones"). Important principles of Qutbism include:

- Adherence to Sharia as sacred law accessible to humans, without which Islam cannot exist
- Adherence to Sharia as a complete way of life that will bring not only justice, but peace, personal serenity, scientific discovery, complete freedom from servitude, and other benefits;
- Avoidance of Western and non-Islamic "evil and corruption," including socialism, nationalism and consumerist capitalism.
- Vigilance against Western and Jewish conspiracies against Islam;
- A two-pronged attack of
  - preaching to convert and,
  - jihad to forcibly eliminate the "structures" of Jahiliyya;
- Jihad to eliminate Jahiliyya not only from the Islamic homeland but from the face of the Earth, seeing it as mutually exclusive with true Islam.

=== Takfirism ===
Qutb declared Islam "extinct," which implied that any Muslims who do not follow his teachings are not actually Muslim. This was intended to shock Muslims into religious rearmament. When taken literally, takfir refers to ex-communication, thereby declaring all non-Qutbist Muslims to be apostates in violation of Sharia law. Violating this law could potentially be punished by death, according to Islamic law.

Because of these serious consequences, Muslims have traditionally been reluctant to practice takfir, that is, to pronounce professed Muslims as unbelievers, even when in violation of Islamic law. This prospect of fitna, or internal strife, between Qutbists and "takfir-ed" mainstream Muslims, led Qutb to conclude that the Egyptian government was irredeemably evil. As a result, he helped to plan a thwarted series of assassinations of Egyptian officials, the discovery of which let to Qutb's trial and eventual execution. Due in part to this teaching, Qutb's ideology remains controversial among Muslims.

It is unclear whether Qutb's proclamation of jahiliyyah was meant to apply the global Muslim community or to only Muslim governments.

In the 1980s and 1990s, a series of terrorist attacks in Egypt were committed by Islamic extremists believed to be influenced by Qutb. Victims included Egyptian President Anwar Sadat, head of the counter-terrorism police Major General Raouf Khayrat, parliamentary speaker Rifaat el-Mahgoub, dozens of European tourists and Egyptian bystanders, and over one hundred Egyptian police officers. Qutb's takfir against the Egyptian government, which he believed to be irredeemably evil, was a primary motivation for the attacks. Other factors included frustration with Egypt's economic stagnation and rage over President Sadat's policy of reconciliation with Israel.

== History ==
=== Spread of Qutb's ideas ===
Qutb's message was spread through his writings, his followers and especially through his brother, Muhammad Qutb. Muhammad was implicated in the assassination plots that led to Qutb's execution, but he was spared the death penalty. After his release from prison, Muhammad moved to Saudi Arabia along with fellow members of the Muslim Brotherhood. There, he became a professor of Islamic Studies and edited, published and promoted his brother Sayyid's works.

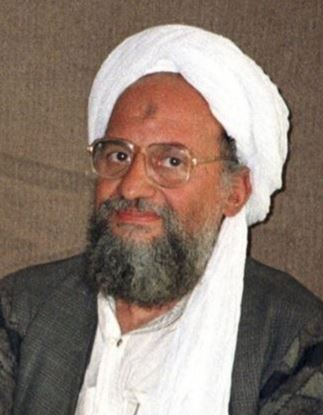
Ayman al-Zawahiri

One of Qutb's key proponents was one of his students, Ayman Al-Zawahiri, who went on to become a member of the Egyptian Islamic Jihad and later a mentor of Osama bin Laden and a leading member of al-Qaeda. He had been first introduced to Sayyad Qutb by his uncle, Mafouz Azzam, who was a close friend to Qutb and taught his nephew that he was an honorable man. Zawahiri paid homage to Qutb in his work Knights under the Prophet's Banner.

Qutbism was propagated by Abdullah Azzam during the Afghan-Soviet War. As the Muslim jihad volunteers from around the world exchanged religious ideas, Qutbism merged with Salafism and Wahhabism, culminating in the formation of Salafi jihadism. Abdullah Azzam was a mentor of bin Laden as well.

Osama bin Laden reportedly regularly attended weekly public lectures by Muhammad Qutb at King Abdulaziz University, and to have read and been deeply influenced by Sayyid Qutb.

The Yemeni Al-Qaeda leader Anwar al-Awlaki also cited Qutb's writings as formative to his ideology.

Many Islamic extremists consider him a father of the movement. Ayman al-Zawahiri, former leader of Al-Qaeda, asserted that Qutb's execution lit "the jihadist fire", and reshaped the direction of the Islamist movement by convincing them that the takfir against Muslim governments made them important targets.

=== Backlash ===
Following Qutb's death, his ideas spread throughout Egypt and other parts of the Arab and Muslim world, prompting a backlash by more traditionalist and conservative Muslims, such as the book Du'ah, la Qudah ("Preachers, not Judges") (1969). The book, written by Muslim Brotherhood Supreme Guide Hassan al-Hudaybi, attacked the idea of Takfir of other Muslims, though it was ostensibly intended as a criticism of Mawdudi.

== Views ==
=== Science and learning ===
On the importance of science and learning, Qutb was ambivalent.

He wrote that Muslims should learn science and develop their capabilities to fulfill their role as representatives of God. He encouraged Muslims to seek knowledge in abstract sciences and arts, whether from Muslim or non-Muslim teachers, so that Muslim communities will have their own experts.

However, Qutb believed that Muslims were not allowed to study some subjects, including:

the principles of economics and political affairs and the interpretation of historical processes... the origin of the universe, the origin of the life of man... philosophy, comparative religion... sociology (excluding statistics and observations)... Darwinist biology ([which] goes beyond the scope of its observations, without any rhyme or reason and only exists for the sake of expressing an opinion...).

He also believed that the era of scientific discovery in the West was over, and that further scientific discovery must be reached in accordance with Sharia law.

=== On philosophy and kalam ===
Qutb also strongly opposed Falsafa and Ilm al-Kalam, which he denounced as deviations which undermined the original Islamic creed because they were based on Aristotelian logic. He denounced these disciplines as alien to Islamic traditions and called for their abandonment in favor of a literalist interpretation of Islamic scriptures.

=== Sharia and governance ===
Qutbism advocates the belief that in a sharia-based society, wonders of justice, prosperity, peace and harmony—both individually and societally—are "not postponed for the next life [i.e. heaven] but are operative even in this world".

Qutb believed harmony and perfection brought by Sharia law is such that the use of offensive jihad to spread sharia-Islam throughout the non-Muslim world is not aggression but rather means of introducing "true freedom" to the masses. Because Sharia law is judged by God rather than man, in this view, enforcing Sharia frees people from servitude to each other.

In other works Qutb describes the ruler of the Islamic state, as a man (never a woman) who "derives his legitimacy from his being elected by the community and from his submission to God. He has no privileges over other Muslims, and is only obeyed as long as he himself adheres to the shari‘a".

=== Conspiracy theories ===
Qutbism emphasizes what it sees as the evil designs of Westerners and Jews against Islam, and it also emphasizes the importance of Muslims not trusting or imitating them.

=== Non-Muslims ===
Qutbisms's teachings on non-Muslims gained attention after the September 11 attacks. Qutb's writings on non-Muslims, particularly Western non-Muslims, are extremely negative. They teach that Christians and Jews are hostile to his movement "simply for being Muslims" and believing in God. He refers to "people of the book," who are typically viewed more favorably than other non-Muslims in Islam, as "depraved" for having "falsified" their religious texts.

Qutb believed Ibn Qayyim al-Jawziyya's teachings that the realm outside of Muslim lands was Dar al-Harb ("the Abode of War"), and had to be subjugated by Muslims. Subjugation would actually be "liberation" however, because it "would free men from all authority except that of God." However, this view also necessitates that non-Muslims not be allowed to make law or choose representatives, lest they disobey Islamic law.

==== The West ====
In Qutb's view, Western imperialism is not only an economic or racial exploitation means of oppression, but rather an attempt to undermine the faith of Muslims. He believed that historians lied to confuse Muslims and weaken their faith by teaching, for example, that the Crusades were an attempt by Christians to reconquer the formerly Christian-ruled holy land. He believed that the ultimate goal of these efforts was to destroy Muslim society.

Qutb spent two years in the U.S. in the late 1940s and he disliked it immensely. Qutb wrote that he experienced "Western malevolence" during his time there, including an attempt by an American agent to seduce him, and the alleged celebration of American hospital employees upon hearing of the assassination of Egyptian Ikhwan Supreme Guide Hassan al-Banna.

Qutb's critics, particularly in the West, have cast doubts upon these stories. Having not been a member of any government or political organization at the time of his visit, it is unlikely that American intelligence agents would have sought him out. Additionally, many Americans did not know who Hassan al-Banna or the Muslim Brotherhood were in 1948, making the celebration of hospital employees unlikely.

==== Western corruption ====
Qutbism emphasizes a claimed Islamic moral superiority over the West, according to Islamist values. One example of the West's perceived moral decay was the "animal-like" mixing of the sexes, as well as jazz, which he found lurid and distasteful for its association with Black Americans. Qutb states that while he was in America a young woman told him that ethics and sex are separate issues, pointing out that animals do not have any problems mixing freely.

Critics such as Maajid Nawaz protest by arguing that Qutb's complaint about both American racism and the "primitive inclinations" of the "Negro" are contradictory and hypocritical. The place Qutb spent most of his time in was the small city of Greeley, Colorado, dominated by cattle feedlots and an "unpretentious university", originally founded as "a sober, godly, cooperative community".

==== Jews ====
The other anti-Islamic conspiratorial group, according to Qutb, is "World Jewry," because that it is engaging in tricks to eliminate "faith and religion", and trying to divert "the wealth of mankind" into "Jewish financial institutions" by charging interest on loans. Jewish designs are so pernicious, according to Qutb's logic, that "anyone who leads this [Islamic] community away from its religion and its Quran can only be [a] Jewish agent."

== Criticism ==
=== By Muslims ===
While Ma'alim fi-l-Tariq [Arabic: معالم في الطريق] (Milestones) was Qutb's manifesto, other elements of Qutbism are found in his works Al-'adala al-Ijtima'iyya fi-l-Islam [Arabic: العدالة الاجتماعية في الاسلام] (Social Justice in Islam), and his Quranic commentary Fi Zilal al-Qur'an [Arabic: في ظلال القرآن] (In the shade of the Qur'an). Ideas in (or alleged to be in) those works also have been criticized by some traditionalist/conservative Muslims. They include:

- Qutb's assertion that slavery was now illegal under Islam, as its lawfulness was only temporary, existing only "until the world devised a new code of practice, other than enslavement." (Note: An example of the conflict between government-approved orthodox Islamic clerics in agreement with Qutb that slavery "is now illegal under Islam", and traditionalists who disagree, was a report of a televised "ceremony" of contemporary "melk al-yameen" [slavery] marriage in July 2012, where "a Muslim cleric, who gave his name as 'Abdul Raouf Aun'", married a woman who "voluntarily gave ownership of herself to" Aun, who also conducted the "marriage." Aun explained that "this form of marriage [does] not requiring witnesses or official confirmation". The marriage was condemned by the al-Azhar Islamic Research Centre as an example of "apostasy and a return to jahiliyyah", and by Egypt's Grand Mufti, Dr. Ali Gomaa as religiously impermissible and akin to "adultery.") Many contemporary Islamic scholars, however, do share the view that slavery is not allowed in Islam in modern times. On the other hand, according to Salafi critics such as Saleh Al-Fawzan, "Islam has affirmed slavery ... And it will continue so long as Jihaad in the path of Allah exists."
- Proposals to redistribute income and property to the needy. Opponents claim they are revisionist and innovations of Islam.
- Describing Moses as having an "excitable nature" – this allegedly being "mockery," and "mockery of the Prophets is apostasy in its own,'" according to Shaikh ‘Abdul-Aziz ibn Baz.
- Dismissing fiqh or the schools of Islamic law known as madhhab as separate from "Islamic principles and Islamic understanding."
- Describing Islamic societies as being sunk in a state of Jahiliyyah (pagan ignorance) implying takfir. Salafi scholars like (Albani, Rabee bin Hadi, Ibn Baz, Ibn Jibreen, Ibn Uthaymeen, Saalih al-Fawzan, Muqbil ibn Hadi, etc.) would condemn Qutb as a heretic for takfiri views as well as for what they considered to be theological deviancies and these ideologies were widely refuted by Al Allāmah Rabee Ibn Hadi Al Madkhali in his books and audio tapes. They also identified his methodology as a distinct "Qutbi manhaj", thus resulting in the labelling of Salafi-Jihadis as "Qutbists" by many of their quietist Salafist opponents.

Qutb may now be facing criticism representing his idea's success or Qutbism's logical conclusion as much as his idea's failure to persuade some critics. Writing before the Islamic revival was in full bloom, Qutb sought Islamically correct alternatives to European ideas like Marxism and socialism and proposed Islamic means to achieve the ends of social justice and equality, redistribution of private property and political revolution. But according to Olivier Roy, contemporary "neofundamentalists refuse to express their views in modern terms borrowed from the West. They consider indulging in politics, even for a good cause, will by definition lead to bid'a and shirk (the giving of priority to worldly considerations over religious values.)"

There are, however, some commentators who display an ambivalence towards him, and Roy notes that "his books are found everywhere and mentioned on most neo-fundamentalist websites, and arguing his "mystical approach", "radical contempt and hatred for the West", and "pessimistic views on the modern world" have resonated with these Muslims.

=== Criticism by Americans ===
James Hess, an analyst at the American Military University (AMU), labelled Qutbism as "Islamic-based terrorism". In his essay criticizing the doctrines of Qutbist ideology, US Army colonel Dale C. Eikmeier described Qutbism as "a fusion of puritanical and intolerant Islamic orientations that include elements from both the Sunni and Shia sects".

== Relationship with the Muslim Brotherhood ==
The controversy over Qutbism is partially caused by two opposing factions which exist within the Islamic revival: the politically quiet Salafi Muslims, and the politically active Muslim groups which are associated with the Muslim Brotherhood.

Although Sayyid Qutb was never the head of the Muslim Brotherhood, he was the Brotherhood's "leading intellectual," the editor of its weekly periodical, and a member of the highest branch in the Brotherhood, the Working Committee and the Guidance Council.

Hassan al-Hudaybi, the leader of the Muslim Brotherhood, argued against takfir and adopted a tolerant attitude. In response, some Qutbists concluded that the Muslim Brotherhood had abandoned their ideology. Ayman al-Zawahiri, a prominent Qutbist, also attacked the Muslim Brotherhood.

After the publication of Ma'alim fi-l-Tariq (Milestones), opinion in the Brotherhood split over his ideas, though many in Egypt (including extremists outside the Brotherhood) and most of the Muslim Brotherhood's members in other countries are said to have shared his analysis "to one degree or another." However, the leadership of the Brotherhood, headed by Hassan al-Hudaybi, remained moderate and interested in political negotiation and activism. By the 1970s, the Brotherhood had renounced violence as a means of achieving its goals. In recent years, his ideas have been embraced by Islamic extremist groups, while the Muslim Brotherhood has tended to serve as the official voice of Moderate Islamism.

== Influence on Jihadist movements ==
In 2005, the British author and religion academic Karen Armstrong declared, regarding the ideological framework of al-Qaeda, that al-Qaeda and nearly every other Islamic fundamentalist movement was influenced by Qutb. She proposed the term "Qutbian terrorism" to describe violence by his followers.

According to The Guardian journalist Robert Manne, "there exists a more or less general consensus that the ideology of the Islamic State was founded upon the principles which were set forth by Qutb", particularly based on some sections of his treatises Milestones and In the Shade of the Qur'an.

However, the self-declared Islamic State in Iraq and Syria, headed by Abu Bakr al-Baghdadi, has been described by various analysts as being more violent than al-Qaeda and closely aligned with Wahhabism, alongside Salafism and Salafi jihadism. In 2014, regarding the ideology of IS, Karen Armstrong remarked that "IS is certainly an Islamic movement [...] because its roots are in Wahhabism, a form of Islam practised in Saudi Arabia that developed only in the 18th century".

Nabil Na'eem, a former associate of Ayman al-Zawahiri and an ex-Islamic Jihad leader, argued that Qutb's writings were the main factor that led to the rise of Al-Qaeda, Islamic State and various Jihadist groups.

== See also ==
- American Islam (term)
- Capitalism and Islam
- History of Egypt under Gamal Abdel Nasser
- History of Egypt under Anwar Sadat
- History of Islam
  - Spread of Islam
- International propagation of Salafism and Wahhabism (by region)
  - Petro-Islam
  - Salafi movement
    - Salafi jihadism
  - Wahhabism
- Islam and violence
  - Islam and war
  - Islamic terrorism
  - Jihad
    - Jihadism
- Islamic fundamentalism
- Islamic schools and branches
  - Persecution of minority Muslim groups
  - Shia–Sunni relations
  - Sufi–Salafi relations
- Political Islam
  - Islamic socialism
  - Khomeinism
  - Pan-Islamism
  - Political aspects of Islam
