= Muhammad Qutb =

Egyptian Islamist writer and scholar

- محمد قطب
- Born: Muhammad Ibrahim Husayn Shadhili Qutb; April 26, 1919; Musha, Egypt
- Died: April 4, 2014 (aged 94); Mecca, Saudi Arabia
- Relatives: Sayyid Qutb (brother)

Muhammad Ibrahim Husayn Shadhili Qutb (Note: /ˈkʌtəb/; Arabic: محمد إبراهيم حسين شاذلي قطب, romanized: Muḥammad ʾIbrāhīm Ḥusayn Shādhilī Quṭb) (April 26, 1919 – April 4, 2014) was an Islamic scholar and the younger brother of the Egyptian revolutionary Sayyid Qutb. After his brother was executed by the Egyptian government, Muhammad moved to Saudi Arabia, where he promoted his brother's ideas.

== Early life and education ==
Muhammad Qutb was the second oldest of five children born in the Upper Egyptian village of Musha near Asyut, 13 years younger than his elder brother, Sayyid. When his father died in 1933, his mother moved with her children to live in Helwan near Cairo.

He studied English literature at the Cairo University, graduating in 1940, and later obtained diplomas in psychology and education.

== Career ==
=== Egypt ===
He was arrested a few days before Sayyid (on 29 July 1965) for his alleged co-leadership along with his brother in a plot to kill leading political and cultural figures in Egypt and overthrow the government. His brother was hanged in 1966, but Muhammad's life was spared and he, along with other members of the Muslim Brotherhood took refuge in Saudi Arabia.

=== Saudi Arabia ===
While there, he edited and published Sayyid's books and taught as a professor of Islamic Studies at (according to different sources) either Mecca's Umm al-Qura University, and/or King Abdulaziz University in Jeddah, and that either Osama bin Laden or Ayman al-Zawahiri (al Qaeda's #2 and leading theorist), was a student. Osama bin Laden recommended "Sheikh Muhammad Qutb's" book, "Concepts that Should be Corrected in a 2004 videotape. According to Lawrence Wright, who interviewed Muhammad Qutb and a close friend in college of bin Laden's, Mohammed Jamal Khalifa, bin Laden "usually attended" Muhammad Qutb's weekly public lectures at King Abdul-Aziz University.

In addition to making available his brother's work, he worked to advance his ideas by "smoothing away" differences between his brother's radical supporters and more conservative Muslims, particularly other members of the Muslim Brotherhood. Muhammad took a less-literal interpretation of his brother's famous statement that the Muslim world and Muslim governments were jahiliyya (returned to pagan ignorance, and thus no longer Muslim). He denied that the country that had given him refuge (Saudi Arabia) was jahiliyya and in 1975 came out publicly against takfir, or judging Muslims as unbelievers. He also worked to reconcile the doctrine of the Muslims Brothers with "the salafism that prevailed in his host country".

In 1986, Safar Al-Hawali defended his dissertation under Qutb's supervision. "His defense was so impressive" that Qutb "declared in public that the student had surpassed his teacher". Al-Hawali went on to become one of the "two main figures of the sahwa" (Islamist awakening), which "mingled radical Wahhabism with Sayyid Qutb's ideas".

== Death ==
Qutb died at a hospital in Mecca on 4 April 2014 at the age of 94.

== Views and ideas ==
=== Antisemitism ===
In many of his writings M. Qutb criticized the current state of the Muslim world and emphasized its weakness in relation to western powers. He attributed that weakness to the Muslim themselves and described them as having failed to apply the true teachings of Islam to their lives or to the running of their societies. He depicted the world as living in a state of ignorance, or jahiliyya, of an even greater degree than the first jahiliyya, which had preceded the coming of the Prophet Muhammad.

However, Muslim ignorance is not the only cause for the crisis in the Muslim world, according to Qutb. He also attributed the weakness of the Muslim world to Islam's enemies, whom he defined as the Christians and the Jews. Qutb often used the terms Crusaders to refer to Christians and Zionists to refer to Jews, by which he recalled earlier military conflicts between these religious groups and Muslim populations. Although Qutb regarded Christians as hostile to Islam, he viewed Christianity as having little influence over modern western society, which he argued is now controlled by Jews.

According to Qutb, Jews' hatred for Islam leads them to attack it wherever they can. Although some of his works referred to military conflicts, Qutb regarded Western cultural imperialism as the main means by which Jews seek to destroy Islam and Muslims. He portrayed this as a more subtle and dangerous method than military invasion because it destroys the Muslim world from within; through their exposure to secular ideas and values Muslims deviate from their religion, which weakens Muslim society as a whole and undermines political loyalty to other Muslim lands. Qutb portrayed western cultural imperialism as having begun with the Napoleonic expedition into Egypt after and then continued and increased in severity. He saw school education as one of the main instruments of western cultural imperialism and criticized it for instilling a slavish admiration of the west into Muslim school children. He also regarded the school system as undermining Islamic values by allowing boys and girls to receive the same education and often together. In addition to schools, Qutb also described newspapers as being used to disseminate the same misinformation and values learnt by the children to their parents, so that these did not object to what their children were learning. He gave the example of Maronite Christians working in journalism in Egypt to support his argument that newspapers were part of a religiously-motivated conspiracy to corrupt the Islamic values of their readers. A key aspect in Qutb’s argument is his opposition to the education of girls and the changing social status of women in Islamic societies. He regarded the mother as central to the religious upbringing of the children and argued that feminism was the most effective means of corrupting Muslim society. That is, firstly, because women who go out to work or to study neglect their children and fail to instil the proper values into them. Secondly, when girls receive a secular education at school they pass this on to their children when they become mothers, which ultimately leads to the corruption of society as a whole.

Therefore, Muhammad Qutb concluded that feminism and calls for female emancipation should be seen as a serious threat to the stability of Muslim society.

Qutb's argument regarding western cultural influence over Muslim society draws heavily on antisemitic conspiracy theories such as The Protocols of the Elders of Zion , and he referred to these texts in his writings. However, his view of the role of women in preserving social structures is not generally an important aspect of antisemitic conspiracy theories. It may come from the French scientist and author Alexis Carrel, who also raised concerns about the effect of feminism on social structures and whose writings were well-known to both Muhammad and Sayyid Qutb.

=== Slavery ===
Muhammad Qutb defended Islamic slavery against Western criticism in his writings. He concluded that, as it appeared in the Muslim world, chattel slavery was better than slavery in the West, as "in the early period of Islam the slave was exalted to such a noble state of humanity as was never before witnessed in any other part of the world", and that "Islam gave spiritual enfranchisement to slaves."

Qutb defended sexual slavery in Islam in the form of concubinage, comparing it favorably to what he termed as adultery, prostitution, and casual sex of Europe, which he termed as "that most odious form of animalism", with what he described as "that clean and spiritual bond that ties a maid [i.e. slave girl] to her master in Islam".

== Influence and legacy ==
Muhammad Qutb was an author in his own right and his writings are widespread in the Arab world and nearly as prolific as his brother's. Jahiliyya in the Twentieth Century is perhaps his best-known work, and gained notoriety as an alleged terrorist handbook (along with his brother's Milestones) when the government claimed to find the two in police searches of plotters' homes and environs.

Another very popular work, Islam: The Misunderstood Religion, expands on his brother's ideas, describing the ways in which fundamentalist Islam is superior to the "perverted ... inhuman ... crazy ... savage and backward" Western world. (Note: Among other things the book maintains that the teachings of Christian clerics in Europe led to "the torturing of scientists and burning them alive because they [the scientists] said, for instance, that the earth was round"; that the science of psychology tells us that a beating of "mild severity" of a wife by her husband is "in certain psychological perversions ... the only effective remedy ... to correct" the wife's "conduct"; that "American statistics ... show that 38% of secondary school girls are pregnant"; and that prostitution was outlawed in Western countries because "prostitutes had lost all their usefulness, their place having been taken by the common sybaritic society girls".)

His teaching has been influential on 20th-century Muslim thought, particularly in Saudi Arabia following his move there in 1972. In addition to his teaching position at the Umm al-Qura University and the King Abdulaziz University Qutb also held private teaching circles and disseminated his lectures by means of cassettes, printed pamphlets and, from the late 1990s onwards, the internet. This helped to spread his popularity beyond university students. One of Qutb's most famous students was Safar al-Hawali, whose thesis on murji'ism and secularization draws heavily on Qutb's own teaching on the subject. Qutb also played an important role in the Sahwa movement, the adherents of which often quote his writings. In addition, Muhammad Qutb's editorial rights over the works of his late brother, Sayyid Qutb, enabled him to select which of Sayyid Qutb's works were published and to censor aspects that he regarded as incompatible with Sayyid Qutb's religious thought.

== Books ==
He wrote 36 books, including:

=== Essays ===
- Shubuhāt Hawla al-Islām (literally "Misconceptions about Islam") (Islam: The Misunderstood Religion) ISBN 0-686-18500-5
- Islam: the Misunderstood Religion, Markazi Maktabi Islami, Delhi-6, 5th edition (English translation)
- Dirāsāt fī al-nafs al-insānīyah.[1963?] (Studies in human psychology) BP166.73 .Q8 Arab
- Hal nahnu Muslimūn (Are we Muslims?) al-Qāhirah : Dār al-Shurūq, 1980, ISBN 977-705-981-7
- al-Insān bayna al-māddīyah wa-al-Islām. (Man between the Material World and Islam) B825 .Q8 (Orien Arab)
- al-Sahwah al-Islāmīyah (The Islamic Resurgence)(al-Qāhirah : Maktabat al-Sunnah, 1990)
- Jahiliyat al-qarn al-`ishrin (Jahiliyya of the Twentieth Century), 292 p.; 23 cm. al-Qahirah : Dar al-Shuruq; ISBN 977-733-606-3
- The Concept of Islam and Our Understanding of It
- The Future is for Islam
- Islam and the Crisis of the Modern World 28 p.; published by The Islamic Foundation, 1979. ISBN 0-86037-047-X
- Waqena Al -moaser, 527 p.; published by Dār al-Shurūq, 1979. ISBN 977-09-0393-0
- Qabasāt min al-Rasūl
- Riḥlah ilá al-Ḥijāz
- al-Taṭawwur wa-al-thabāt fī ḥayāt al-bashrīyah, on religion and science
- Maḥmūd al-Badawī : ʻāshiq al-qiṣṣah al-qaṣīrah, biographical work on Egyptian writer Mahmud al-Badawi
- al-Fann wa-al-basāṭah : qirāʼah fi al-qiṣṣah al-qaṣīrah ʻinda Tharwat Abāẓah, study of the works of Egyptian writer Tharwat Abaza
- Muḥammad Jubrīl wa-ʻālamuhu al-qaṣaṣī, study of the works of Egyptian writer Muhammad Jibril
- al-Ruʼá wa-al-aḥlām : qirāʼah fī nuṣūṣ riwāʼīyah, literary criticism on Arab novel
- al-Sard fī muwājahat al-wāqiʻ : fuṣūl min al-qiṣ̣ṣah al-Suʻūdīyah, literary criticism on Saudi literature

=== Novels ===
- al-Sayyid alladhī raḥal
- al-Khurūj ilá al-nabʻ
- al-Ṭaraf al-ākhar min al-bayt

=== Short stories ===
- al-Banāt wa-al-qamar
- Ṣadaʼ al-qulūb

=== Poetry ===
- Daftar al-alwān
