= Sayyid Qutb =

Egyptian political theorist and revolutionary (1906–1966)

- سيد قطب
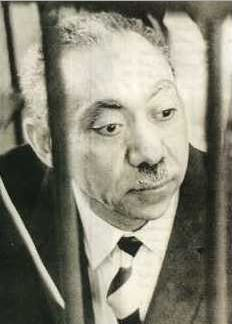
- Qutb on trial in 1966 (Note: Although the photo is from other sources, it is identified on the BBC documentary The Power of Nightmares as being the only known photo of Qutb at his trial immediately preceding his execution.)

Personal life
- Born: Sayyid Ibrahim Husayn Shadhili Qutb; 9 October 1906 Mūshā, Asyut Governorate, Khedivate of Egypt
- Died: 29 August 1966 (aged 59) Cairo, United Arab Republic
- Cause of death: Execution by hanging
- Era: Modern era
- Political party: Muslim Brotherhood (1950-1966)
- Main interest(s): Islam, politics, Quranic exegesis (tafsir)
- Notable idea(s): Jahiliyyah, Ubudiyya
- Notable work(s): Milestones, In the Shade of the Quran
- Education: Colorado State College of Education (no degree)
- Relatives: Muhammad Qutb (brother)

Religious life
- Religion: Islam
- Denomination: Sunni
- Jurisprudence: Shafi'i

Muslim leader
- Influenced by: ‘Abd al-Qahir al-Jurjani, Ibn al-Qayyim, Ibn Taymiyyah, Rashid Rida, Hassan al-Banna, Alexis Carrel, Abbās al-Aqqād, Sayyid Abul Ala Maududi, Muhammad 'Abduh, Oswald Spengler, Arnold J. Toynbee
- Influenced: Abdullah Azzam, Abu Muhammad al-Maqdisi, Anwar al-Awlaki, Ayman al-Zawahiri, Mahmoud Ezzat, Mohammed Badie, Muhammad abd-al-Salam Faraj, Muhammad Qutb, Osama bin Laden, Shukri Mustafa, Ruhollah Khomeini, Ali Khamenei, Abu Ali al-Anbari

Sayyid Ibrahim Husayn Shadhili Qutb (Note: /ˈkuːtəb/; Egyptian Arabic: [ˈsæjjed ˈʔotˤb]; Arabic: سيد إبراهيم حسين شاذلي قطب, romanized: Sayyid 'Ibrāhīm Ḥusayn Shādhilī Quṭb) (9 October 1906 – 29 August 1966) was an Egyptian political theorist and revolutionary who was a leading member of the Muslim Brotherhood.

As the author of 24 published books, with around 30 unpublished for different reasons (mainly due to destruction by the state), and at least 581 articles, including novels, literary arts critique and works on education, Qutb is best known in the Muslim world for his work on what he believed to be the social and political role of Islam, particularly in his books Social Justice and Ma'alim fi al-Tariq (Milestones). His magnum opus, Fi Zilal al-Qur'an (In the Shade of the Qur'an), is a 30-volume commentary on the Quran. Even though most of his observations and criticism were leveled at the Muslim world, Qutb also intensely disapproved of the society and culture of the United States, which he saw as materialistic, and obsessed with violence and sexual pleasures. He advocated offensive jihad.

During most of his life, Qutb's inner circle mainly consisted of influential politicians, intellectuals, poets and literary figures, both of his age and of the preceding generation. By the mid-1940s, many of his writings were included in the curricula of schools, colleges and universities. In 1966, he was convicted of plotting the assassination of Egyptian President Gamal Abdel Nasser and was executed by hanging.

Qutb has been described by followers as a great thinker and martyr for Islam, while Western observers and some Muslims (Note: Writing before 9/11, Islamist British convert to Islam, Hamid Algar, stated: "Sayyid Qutb ... some 28 years after his death is still the most influential ideologue of the Islamic movement in the contemporary Arab world ... Ma'alim fi 'l-Tariq [Milestones] must definitely count among the historic documents of the contemporary Islamic movement.") see him as a key originator of Islamist ideology, and an inspiration for militant Islamist groups, such as al-Qaeda. (Note: examples of praise for Qutb: "Qutb's importance and influence on fundamentalist movements and contemporary Islamic revival are acknowledged by Westerners and Easterners; he has been long considered one of the most distinguished contemporary fundamentalist thinkers and numerous labels have been bestowed on him:" ...: The ideologue of the Ikhwan` - Asaf Hussain; The most noted advocate of the interpretation of Islam as revolution` - Haddad (? last name); An eminent leader of the Brethren` - President Sadat of Misr.; One of Islam's new crusaders` - Abu al-Hasan al-Nadawi; A matchless writer` - S. Badrul Hasan; The only thinker who enjoys purity in intellectual methodology and straightforwardness in action` - Muhammad Barakat; One of the greatest thinkers of contemporary Islamic thought` - Abbas Muhammad Abd Allah; The most famous personality in the Muslim world in the second half of the 20th century` - Mahdi Fadl Allah; The leading ideologue of the Muslim Brotherhood` - Dilip Hiro; The leading writer and theorist of the Egyptian Brothers after Banna's death.` - Edward Mortimer) Strengthened by his status as a martyr, Qutb's ideas on Jahiliyya (Age of Ignorance) and his close linking of implementation of sharia (Islamic Law) with Tawhid (Islamic monotheism) has highly influenced contemporary Islamist and Jihadist movements. His supporters are often identified as Qutbists or Qutbi.

== Life and public career ==
=== Early life ===
Sayyid Ibrahim Husayn Shadhili Qutb was born on 9 October 1906. He was raised in the Egyptian village of Musha, located in Upper Egypt's Asyut Province. His father, whose sixth great-grandfather was an Indian Muslim, was an Upper Egyptian landowner and the administrator of the family estate, but he was also well known for his political activism, holding weekly meetings to discuss the political events and Quranic recitation. At this young age, Sayyid Qutb first learned about melodic recitations of the Quran, which would fuel the artistic side of his personality. He eventually memorized the whole Quran at 10.

A precocious child, during these years, he began collecting different types of books, including Sherlock Holmes stories, A Thousand and One Nights, and texts on astrology and magic that he would use to help local people with exorcisms (ruqya). In his teens, Qutb was critical of the religious institutions with which he came into contact, holding in contempt the way in which those institutions were used to form public opinion and thoughts. He had a special disdain, however, for schools that specialized in religious studies only, and sought to demonstrate that local schools that held regular academic classes as well as classes in religion were more beneficial to their pupils than religious schools with lopsided curricula. At this time, Qutb developed his bent against the imams and their traditional approach to education. This confrontation would persist throughout his life.

Qutb moved to Cairo, where between 1929 and 1933 he received an education based on the British style of schooling before starting his career as a teacher in the Ministry of Public Instruction. During his early career, Qutb devoted himself to literature as an author and critic, writing such novels as Ashwak (Thorns) and even helped to elevate Egyptian novelist Naguib Mahfouz from obscurity. He wrote his very first article in the literary magazine al-Balagh in 1922, while still a teenager, and his first book, Muhimmat al-Sha’ir fi al-Haya wa Shi’r al-Jil al-Hadir (The Mission of the Poet in Life and the Poetry of the Present Generation), in 1932, when he was 25, in his last year at Dar al-Ulum. As a literary critic, he was particularly influenced by ‘Abd al-Qahir al-Jurjani (d. 1078), "in his view one of the few mediaeval philologists to have concentrated on meaning and aesthetic value at the expense of form and rhetoric." In 1939, he became a functionary in Egypt's Ministry of Education (wizarat al-ma'arif).

In the early 1940s, he encountered the work of Nobel Prize-winner French eugenicist Alexis Carrel, who would have a seminal and lasting influence on his criticism of Western civilization, as "instead of liberating man, as the post-Enlightenment narrative claimed, he believed that Western modernity enmeshed people in spiritually numbing networks of control and discipline, and that rather than building caring communities, it cultivated attitudes of selfish individualism. Qutb regarded Carrel as a rare sort of Western thinker, one who understood that his civilization "depreciated humanity" by honouring the "machine" over the "spirit and soul" (al-nafs wa al-ruh). He saw Carrel's critique, coming as it did from within the enemy camp, as providing his discourse with an added measure of legitimacy."

From 1948 to 1950, he went to the United States on a scholarship to study its educational system, spending several months at Colorado State College of Education (now the University of Northern Colorado) in Greeley, Colorado. Qutb's first major theoretical work of religious social criticism, Al-'adala al-Ijtima'iyya fi-l-Islam (Social Justice in Islam), was published in 1949, during his time in the West.

Though Islam gave him much peace and contentment, he suffered from respiratory and other health problems throughout his life and was known for "his introvertedness, isolation, depression and concern." In appearance, he was "pale with sleepy eyes." Qutb never married, in part because of his steadfast religious convictions. While the urban Egyptian society he lived in was becoming more Westernized, Qutb believed the Quran taught women that 'Men are the managers of women's affairs ...' Qutb lamented to his readers that he was never able to find a woman of sufficient "moral purity and discretion" and had to reconcile himself to bachelorhood.

It was clear from his childhood that Qutb valued education, playing the part of a teacher to the women in his village:

"Syed Qutb from a young age would save up his money for a man called Amsaalih, who used to sell books around the local villages. He would have a big collection of books, and another small collection specifically for Syed Qutb. If Syed never had the money, he would tell him that I don't have the money now, so let me borrow it and I'll give it you next time you come around. And Amsaalih would let him do that. At the age of 12, he had his own library collection of 25 books, even though books were really expensive during that time. He would imitate the scholars by reading the books, and then give lectures to the rest of the village. If any women needed any information, they would wait till Syed Qutb came back from school, and ask him to share the knowledge he had to them. In many occasions he would be shy because he was a young man, but in some occasions he would go and teach the knowledge he had to the people who asked him."

=== Two years in the United States ===
Time in the United States, pursuing further studies in educational administration, cemented some of Qutb's views. Over two years, he worked and studied at Wilson Teachers' College in Washington, D.C. (one of the precursors to today's University of the District of Columbia), Colorado State College for Education (now the University of Northern Colorado) in Greeley, and Stanford University. He visited the major cities of the United States and spent time in Europe on his journey home.

Before his departure from the United States, even though more and more conservative, he still was "Western in so many ways – his dress, his love of classical music and Hollywood movies. He had read, in translation, the works of Charles Darwin and Albert Einstein, Lord Byron and Percy Bysshe Shelley, and had immersed himself in French literature, especially Victor Hugo".

==== Criticisms of American culture and society: "The America that I Have Seen" ====
On his return to Egypt, Qutb in 1951 published "The America that I Have Seen", where he became explicitly critical of things he had observed in the United States, eventually encapsulating the West more generally: its materialism, individual freedoms, economic system, "poor" haircuts, superficiality in conversations and friendships, restrictions on divorce, enthusiasm for sports, lack of artistic feeling, "animal-like" mixing of the genders (which "went on even in churches"), and strong support for the new Israeli state. Qutb noted with disapproval the openly displayed sexuality of American women:

The American girl is well acquainted with her body's seductive capacity. She knows it lies in the face, and in expressive eyes, and thirsty lips. She knows seductiveness lies in the round breasts, the full buttocks, and in the shapely thighs, sleek legs—and she shows all this and does not hide it.

He also commented on the American taste in arts:

The American is primitive in his artistic taste, both in what he enjoys as art and in his own artistic works. "Jazz" music is his music of choice. This is that music that the Negroes invented to satisfy their primitive inclinations, as well as their desire to be noisy on the one hand and to excite bestial tendencies on the other. The American's intoxication in "jazz" music does not reach its full completion until the music is accompanied by singing that is just as coarse and obnoxious as the music itself. Meanwhile, the noise of the instruments and the voices mounts, and it rings in the ears to an unbearable degree ... The agitation of the multitude increases, and the voices of approval mount, and their palms ring out in vehement, continuous applause that all but deafens the ears.

=== Return to Egypt ===
Qutb concluded that major aspects of American life were primitive and "shocking"; he saw Americans as "numb to faith in religion, faith in art, and faith in spiritual values altogether". His experience in the United States formed in part the impetus for his rejection of Western values and his move towards Islamism upon returning to Egypt. Resigning from the civil service, he joined the Muslim Brotherhood in the early 1950s and became editor-in-chief of the Brothers' weekly Al-Ikhwan al-Muslimin, and later head of its propaganda section, as well as an appointed member of the working committee and of its guidance council, the highest branch in the organization.

=== Nasser and Qutb's death ===
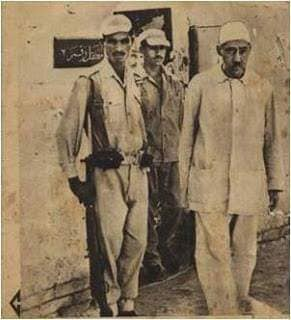
Sayyid Qutb during his years of imprisonment

In July 1952, Egypt's pro-Western government was overthrown by the nationalist Free Officers Movement headed by Gamal Abdel Nasser. Both Qutb and the Muslim Brotherhood welcomed the coup d'état against the monarchist government—which they saw as un-Islamic and subservient to the British Empire—and enjoyed a close relationship with the movement prior to and immediately following the coup. Nasser would go to the house of Qutb and ask him for ideas about the Revolution. Many members of the Brotherhood expected Nasser to establish an Islamic government. However, the co-operation between the Brotherhood and Free Officers which marked the revolution's success soon soured as it became clear the secular nationalist ideology of Nasserism was incompatible with the Islamism of the Brotherhood.

Nasser had secretly set up an organisation that would sufficiently oppose the Muslim Brotherhood once he came to power. This organisation was called "Tahreer" ("Liberation" in Arabic). It was well known that the Brotherhood were made popular by their extensive social programs in Egypt, and Nasser wanted to be ready once he had taken over. At this time, Qutb did not realize Nasser's alternate plans, and would continue to meet with him, sometimes for 12 hours a day, to discuss a post monarchical Egypt. Once Qutb realized that Nasser had taken advantage of the secrecy between the Free Officers and the Brotherhood, he promptly quit. Nasser then tried to persuade Qutb by offering him any position he wanted in Egypt except its Kingship, saying: "We will give you whatever position you want in the government, whether it's the Ministry of Education, Ministry of Arts, etc."

Qutb refused every offer, having understood the reality of Nasser's plans. Upset that Nasser would not enforce a government based on Islamic ideology, Qutb and other Brotherhood members allegedly plotted to assassinate him in 1954. The alleged attempt was foiled and Qutb was jailed soon afterwards; the Egyptian government used the incident to justify a crackdown on various members of the Muslim Brotherhood for their vocal opposition towards the Nasser administration. During his first three years in prison, conditions were bad and Qutb was tortured. In later years he was allowed more mobility, including the opportunity to write. This period saw the composition of his two most important works: a commentary of the Quran Fi Zilal al-Qur'an (In the Shade of the Qur'an), and a manifesto of political Islam called Ma'alim fi-l-Tariq (Milestones). These works represent the final form of Qutb's thought, encompassing his radically anti-secular and anti-Western claims based on his interpretations of the Quran, Islamic history, and the social and political problems of Egypt. The school of thought he inspired has become known as Qutbism.

Qutb was let out of prison in May 1964 at the behest of the President of Iraq, Abdul Salam Arif, for only 8 months before being rearrested on August 9, 1965. He was accused of plotting to overthrow the state and subjected to what some consider a show trial. Many of the charges placed against Qutb in court were taken directly from Ma'alim fi-l-Tariq and he adamantly supported his written statements. The trial culminated in a death sentence for Qutb and six other members of the Muslim Brotherhood. He was sentenced to death for his part in the conspiracy to assassinate the President and other Egyptian officials and personalities, though he was not the instigator or leader of the actual plot. On 29 August 1966, he was executed by hanging.

== Evolution of thought, views and statements ==
=== Theological stances ===
Qutb held that belief in matters that cannot be seen (or are imperceptible) was an important sign of man's ability to accept knowledge from fields outside of science:

The concept of the imperceptible is a decisive factor in distinguishing man from animal. Materialist thinking, ancient as well as modern, has tended to drag man back to an irrational existence, with no room for the spiritual, where everything is determined by sensory means alone. What is peddled as "progressive thought" is no more than dismal regression.

Simultaneously, he rejected magical beliefs asserted by traditional interpretations of Islamic narratives, such as rejecting the tradition that Surah al-Falaq was meant to be sent down to break a curse.

=== Secularism ===
Beginning from 1948, Qutb's ideological orientation would radically shift to an Islamist worldview, when he penned his first Islamist treatise al-‘Adāla. Qutb would later denounce the literary works he published during the 1940s as "un-Islamic".

Different theories have been advanced as to why Qutb turned away from his secularist tendencies towards Islamic sharia. One common explanation is that the conditions he witnessed in prison from 1954 to 1964, including the torture and murder of the Muslim Brotherhood members, convinced him that only a government bound by Islamic law could prevent such abuses. Another is that Qutb's experiences in America as a darker-skinned person and the insufficiently anti-Western policies of Nasser demonstrated to him the powerful and dangerous allure of jahiliyyah (pre-Islamic ignorance)—a threat unimaginable, in Qutb's estimation, to the secular mind. In the opening of his book Milestones he presents the following views:

"It is necessary for the new leadership to preserve and develop the material fruits of the creative genius of Europe, and also to provide mankind with such high ideals and values as have so far remained undiscovered by mankind, and which will also acquaint humanity with a way of life which is harmonious with human nature, which is positive and constructive, and which is practicable."

"Democracy in the West has become infertile to such an extent that it is borrowing from the systems of the Eastern bloc, especially in the economic system, under the name of socialism. It is the same with the Eastern bloc. Its social theories, foremost among which is Marxism, in the beginning attracted not only a large number of people from the East but also from the West, as it was a way of life based on a creed. But now Marxism is defeated on the plane of thought, and if it is stated that not a single nation in the world is truly Marxist, it will not be an exaggeration. On the whole this theory conflicts with man's nature and its needs. This ideology prospers only in a degenerate society or in a society which has become cowed as a result of some form of prolonged dictatorship. But now, even under these circumstances, its materialistic economic system is failing, although this was the only foundation on which its structure was based. Russia, which is the leader of the communist countries, is itself suffering from shortages of food. Although during the times of the Tsars Russia used to produce surplus food, it now has to import food from abroad and has to sell its reserves of gold for this purpose. The main reason for this is the failure of the system of collective farming, or, one can say, the failure of a system which is against human nature."

These experiences would prompt Qutb to adopt a radical stance, of excommunicating the Muslim governments as well as their supporters out of the pale of Islam. These revolutionary ideas published through his 1960s prison writings "In the Shade of the Qur’an" and its spin-off, "Milestones", would lay the ideological foundations of future Jihadist movements. In Ma'alim fi-l-Tariq Qutb argues that anything non-Islamic was evil and corrupt, and that following sharia as a complete system extending into all aspects of life, would bring every kind of benefit to humanity, from personal and social peace, to the "treasures" of the universe.

Qutb's experiences as an Egyptian Muslim—his village childhood, professional career, and activism in the Muslim Brotherhood—left an indelible mark on his theoretical and religious works. Even Qutb's early, secular writing shows evidence of his later themes. For example, Qutb's autobiography of his childhood Tifl min al-Qarya (A Child From the Village) makes little mention of Islam or political theory and is typically classified as a secular, literary work. However, it is replete with references to village mysticism, superstition, the Qur'an, and incidences of injustice. Qutb's later work developed along similar themes, dealing with Qur'anic exegesis, social justice, and political Islam.

Qutb's career as a writer also heavily influenced his philosophy. In al-Taswiir al-Fanni fil-Quran (Artistic Representation in the Qur'an), Qutb developed a literary appreciation of the Qur'an and a complementary methodology for interpreting the text. His hermeneutics were applied in his extensive commentary on the Qur'an, Fi zilal al-Qur'an, which served as the foundation for the declarations of Ma'alim fi-l-Tariq.

Late in his life, Qutb synthesized his personal experiences and intellectual development in Ma'alim fi-l-Tariq, a religious and political manifesto for what he believed was a true Islamic system. It was also in this text that Qutb condemned Muslim governments, such as Abdul Nasser's regime in Egypt, as secular, with their legitimacy based on human (and thus corrupt), rather than divine authority. This work, more than any other, established Qutb as one of the premier Islamists of the 20th century, and perhaps the foremost proponent of Islamist thought in that era. Qutb denounced secularism as an inherently "oppressive system" since it sabotaged freedom of religion by constraining all religious practice to the private realm; whereas an Islamic state would grant full religious freedom to Muslims by implementing Islamic laws publicly while delegating non-Muslim faiths to the private realm.

Qutb, dissatisfied with the condition of contemporary Islam, identified its benighted state as having two principal causes. The first was that many Muslims were forsaking their faith in the Quran, failing to enforce Sharia law. This had led to the virulent spread of a secular culture within Muslim societies, which, with the assistance of the innate and centuries-long Western hatred towards Islam, was a second important cause of the straying of many Muslims from the right path. Qutb asserted that the Islamic world had sunk into a state of jahiliyyah. This led Qutb to advocate in his book Milestones that the general masses weren't Muslims and that a revolutionary Islamic vanguard should return the ignorant people back to what he considered as pristine Islam:

"Indeed, people are not Muslims, as they proclaim to be, as long as they live the life of Jahiliyyah. If someone wishes to deceive himself or to deceive others by believing that Islam can be brought in line with this Jahiliyyah, it is up to him. But whether this deception is for others, it cannot change anything of the actual reality. This is not Islam, and they are not Muslims. Today the task of the Call is to return these ignorant people to Islam and make them into Muslims all over again".

== Political philosophy ==
Qutb's mature political views always centered on Islam—Islam as a complete system of morality, justice and governance, whose sharia laws and principles should be the sole basis of governance and everything else in life – though his interpretation of it varied.

Following the 1952 coup, he espoused a 'just dictatorship' that would 'grant political liberties to the virtuous alone.' Later he wrote that rule by sharia law would require essentially no government at all. In an earlier work, Qutb described military jihad as defensive, Islam's campaign to protect itself, while later he believed jihad must be offensive.

On the issue of Islamic governance, Qutb differed with many modernist and reformist Muslims who claimed that democracy was Islamic because the Quranic institution of Shura supported elections and democracy. Qutb pointed out that the Shura chapter of the Quran was revealed during the Mekkan period, and therefore, it does not deal with the problem of government. It makes no reference to elections and calls only for the ruler to consult some of the ruled, as a particular case of the general rule of Shura.

Qutb also opposed the then popular ideology of Arab nationalism, having become disillusioned with the 1952 Nasser Revolution after having been exposed to the regime's practices of arbitrary arrest, torture, and deadly violence during his imprisonment. In the introduction to his influential 1964 theological and political manifesto Maʿālim fī aṭ Ṭarīq, Sayyid Qutb declared:

"Mankind today is on the brink of a precipice, not because of the danger of complete [nuclear] annihilation which is hanging over its head – this being just a symptom and not the real disease – but because humanity is devoid of those vital values which are necessary not only for its healthy development but also for its real progress. Even the Western world realises that Western civilization is unable to present any healthy values for the guidance of mankind... It is the same with the Eastern bloc. Its social theories, foremost among which is Marxism ... is defeated on the plane of thought ... It is essential for mankind to have new leadership! At this crucial and bewildering juncture, the turn of Islam and the Muslim community has arrived – the turn of Islam".

Qutb's intense dislike of the West and ethnic nationalism notwithstanding, a number of authors believe he was influenced by European fascism (Roxanne L. Euben, Aziz Al-Azmeh, Khaled Abou El Fadl). (Note: "In Milestones he [Qutb] attempted to offer a description of the genuine Islamic society and the true Islamic faith, but in reality, Qutb's book did nothing more than attempt to add an Islamic veneer to a thoroughly fascist ideological construct.... Qutb provided a more detailed vision of the idealistic and utopian Islamic state. In this regard, Qutb, unlike Abd al-Wahhab, was influenced by Western thinkers, particularly the German fascist philosopher Carl Schmitt. Although Qutb does not once mention Schmidt in his works, a careful reading of Milestones on the Road reveals that many of Qutb's ideas, constructs and phrases are clearly adapted from the works of Schmidt.") Qutb's political philosophy has been described as an attempt to instantiate a complex and multilayer eschatological vision, partly grounded in the counter-hegemonic re-articulation of the traditional ideal of Islamic universalism.

=== Antisemitism ===
Qutb was a staunch antisemite. Influenced by Islamists like Rashid Rida, Qutb embraced anti-Semitic conspiracy theories and believed in the existence of global Jewish conspiracies. In 1950, he published a book Our Struggle against the Jews, which forms a central part of today's Islamist antisemitism. Blaming the Jews for advocating secularising reforms in the Ottoman Empire and inciting various turmoils that resulted in its dissolution, Qutb wrote:

"A Jew was behind the incitement of various kinds of tribal arrogance in the last Caliphate; the (fomenting) of revolutions which began with the removal of the shari‘ah from the legislation and substituting for it ‘The Constitution’ during the period of the Sultan Abdul Hamid II; and the ‘hero’ Ataturk’s ending of the Caliphate. Then behind the subsequent war declared against the first signs of Islamic revival, from every place on the face of the earth ... stood the Jews."

=== View on the harmony of man ===
Qutb felt strongly that the world was meant to serve man if understood properly. He wrote:

"Islam teaches that God created the physical world and all its forces for man's own use and benefit. Man is specifically taught and directed to study the world around him, discover its potential and utilize all his environment for his own good and the good of his fellow humans. Any harm that man suffers at the hands of nature is a result only of his ignorance or lack of understanding of it and of the laws governing it. The more man learns about nature, the more peaceful and harmonious his relationship with nature and the environment. Hence, the notion of "conquering nature" can readily be seen as cynical and negative. It is alien to Islamic perceptions and betrays a shameless ignorance of the spirit in which the world has been created and the divine wisdom that underlies it."

=== Jahiliyyah versus freedom in Islam ===
This exposure to abuse of power crucially contributed to the ideas in Qutb's prison-written Islamic manifesto Ma'alim fi-l-Tariq, where he advocated a political system that is the opposite of dictatorship—the Sharia, "God's rule on earth". Qutb believed that there are only two kinds of societies: Islamic and Jahili. According to Qutb, all the existing Muslim societies are also "jahili societies" since they relegated "the legislative attribute of God to others". He further wrote:

"The Muslim community has long ago vanished from existence and from observation, and the leadership of mankind has long since passed to other ideologies and other nations, other concepts and other systems."

Qutb argued:

- Much of the Muslim world approaches the Quran as a means to simply acquire culture and information, to participate in academic discussions and enjoyment. This evades the real purpose, for rather, it should be approached as orders to be followed ("what the Almighty Creator had prescribed for him"), as a source of "instruction for obedience and action".
- Rather than support rule by a pious few, (whether a dictator(s) or democratically elected), (Note: "assemblies of men which have absolute power to legislate laws" is un-Islamic as well) Qutb believed in what one observer has called "a kind of anarcho-Islam". Since Muslims would need neither judges nor police to obey divine sharia law ("As soon as a command is given, the heads are bowed, and nothing more is required for its implementation except to hear it."), there would be no rulers, no "servitude to other men", which is an un-Islamic violation of God's sovereignty (Hakamiyya) over all of creation.
- The way to bring about this freedom was for a revolutionary vanguard to fight jahiliyyah with a twofold approach: preaching, and using "physical power and jihad" to "abolish" the organizations and authorities of the Jahili system.
- The vanguard movement would grow with preaching and jihad until it formed a truly Islamic community, then spread throughout the Islamic homeland and finally throughout the entire world, attaining leadership of humanity. While those who had been "defeated by the attacks of the treacherous Orientalists!" might define jihad "narrowly" as defensive, Islamically correct jihad (according to Qutb) was in fact offensive, not defensive.

Qutb emphasized that this struggle would be anything but easy. True Islam would transform every aspect of society, eliminating everything non-Muslim. True Muslims could look forward to lives of "poverty, difficulty, frustration, torment and sacrifice." Jahili ersatz-Muslims, Jews and Westerners would all fight and conspire against Islam and the elimination of jahiliyyah. Qutb's revolutionary claims of the Islamic World being upon "Jahiliyya" and absence of "pure Islam" in the modern era set him apart from his Islamist predecessors. For mainstream Islamist ideologues like Hasan al Banna, Abul A'la Mawdudi and Abul Hasan Ali Nadwi, both society and state were Islamic despite the influence of "Jahili culture" of the West.

=== Vanguardism ===
Qutb's program for a revolutionary vanguard bears some resemblance to Vladimir Lenin's conception of revolution. According to scholar Ömer Çaha, this was tied to Qutb's "Leninist background". Çaha further suggested that his political project shared values with Leninism as it emphasized collectivity, centralized power and anticapitalism. Ibrahim Al-Houdaiby, a theorist who was connected to the modern-day Muslim Brotherhood, also stated that Milestones was "heavily influenced by Lenin’s What is to be done, with the clear Islamization of its basic notions".

However, despite this strategic similarity, Qutb firmly rejected all Western ideologies, socialism being no exception. For example, he wrote: "Islam ... is the only Divine way of life ... those who deviate from this system and want some other system, whether it be based on nationalism ... class struggle, or similar corrupt theories are truly enemies of mankind!"

== Criticisms and defense ==
Although his work has motivated and mobilized some Muslims, Qutb also has critics. Following the publication of Milestones and the aborted plot against the Nasser government, mainstream Muslims took issue with Qutb's contention that "physical power" and jihad had to be used to overthrow governments, attack societies, and the "institutions and traditions" of the Muslim – but according to Qutb jahili – world. The ulama of Al-Azhar University school took the unusual step following his death of putting Sayyid Qutb on their index of heresy, declaring him a "deviant" (munharif).

Moderate Muslims, on the other hand, questioned his understanding of sharia, i.e. that it is not only perfect and complete, but completely accessible to people and thus the solution to any of their problems. Also criticized is his dismissal of not only all non-Muslim culture, but many centuries of Muslim learning, culture and beauty following the first four caliphs as un-Islamic and thus worthless.

Conservative criticism went further, condemning Qutb's Islamist/reformist ideas proposed in his earlier works in the 1950s such as "Social Justice in Islam" – like social justice and redistributive economics, banning of slavery, – as "western" and bid‘ah or innovative (innovations to Islam being forbidden). They have accused Qutb of amateur scholarship, overuse of ijtihad, innovation in Ijma (which Qutb felt should not be limited to scholars, but should be conducted by all Muslims), declaring unlawful what Allah has made lawful, assorted mistakes in aqeedah (belief) and manhaj (methodology). Qutb has also come under fire from the moderate factions of the Muslim Brotherhood represented by scholars such as Yusuf al-Qaradwi who staunchly critiqued Qutb's ideas on jahiliyya as Takfiri extremism.

=== Defense ===
In spite of opposition from its moderate factions, the mainstream of Muslim Brotherhood that adheres to Hassan al-Banna's school of thought continues to extoll Qutb as "al-Shahid al-Hayy" (the living martyr). The Muslim Brotherhood also has militant Qutbist factions under its umbrella that continues to popularise Qutb's works like Milestones that inspire revolutionary action. Although the establishment Banni factions favour gradualist approach to establish Islamic states through mainstream political participation, they also strongly defend Qutb's legacy to shore up support from their conservative base. This has also been described as an implicit strategy of covert support to the Qutbist project of immediate "Jihad bi-l-Sayf " (Jihad through the sword) against contemporary regimes; while Muslim Brotherhood focuses on long term Islamization strategy through education, mobilization and execution. Despite internal tensions within the group, Qutbist ideologues continue to exert inordinate influence in various echelons of the Muslim Brotherhood and have become a vehicle for popularising Qutb's Jihadist ideas amongst the masses.

Saudi Arabian Islamic scholar Hamud ibn Uqla Ash-Shu'aybi, the leader of the Shu'aybi school, wrote an influential treatise "A Word of Truth on Sayyid Qutb" in defending Sayyid Qutb from his theological opponents. Praising Qutb as a "Mujaddid", ibn Uqla accused Qutb's opponents of having double-standards in their criticism. He extolled Qutb as a martyr who upheld Tawhid and defended sharia in the face of tyrants. The treatise would become popular amongst contemporary Salafi-Jihadist movements. Defending Qutb, Ibn Uqla wrote:

"Sayyid (may God have mercy upon him) was considered in his era as a science amongst the knowledge of the people who's [sic] curriculum was to fight the oppressors and declare them as disbelievers. He was also one of the unique preachers who called on people to worship their Lord and who preached the unification of all laws to none other than Allah. He did not bow down under the enemies of Allah and His Prophet, like Jamal Abdel-Nasser and his likes ... no one was happier by his death than those ... The targeting of Sayyid Qutb (may God have mercy upon him) wasn't just due to his personality ... the goal of his stabbing wasn’t his downfall ... what still worries his enemies and their followers is his curriculum (manhaj) which they fear will spread amongst the children of the Muslims."

Influential Salafi scholar Muhammad Nasir Al-Din al-Albani (d. 1999) would soften his previous critique of Sayyid Qutb, stating:

"Yes, Sayyid Qutb must be refuted, but with composure, and dispassionately ... But that does not mean that we must show him hostility, or forget that he has certain merits. The important thing is that he is a Muslim and an Islamic writer ... who was killed for the sake of da‘wa, and that those who killed him are the enemies of God."

== Legacy ==
Alongside notable Islamists like Abul A'la Maududi, Hassan al-Banna, and Ruhollah Khomeini; Sayyid Qutb is considered one of the most influential Muslim thinkers or activists of the modern era, not only for his ideas but also for what many see as his martyr's death. Qutb has been designated as Shaheed, or martyr. To fellow militant Islamists across the world, Qutb's execution in a Muslim country symbolised the depths of depravity the governments in the Muslim world had sunk into. Within Egypt itself, the martyrdom of Sayyid Qutb give birth to a new generation of militant Islamists calling for the implementation of sharia; such as Abdus Salam Faraj, 'Umar Abdul Rahman, Shukri Mustafa, etc. According to authors Daniel Benjamin and Steven Simon, "it was Sayyid Qutb who fused together the core elements of modern Islamism: the Kharijites' takfir, ibn Taymiyya's fatwas and policy prescriptions, Rashid Rida's Salafism, Maududi's concept of the contemporary jahiliyya and Hassan al-Banna's political activism."

Qutb's written works are still widely available and have been translated into many Western languages. His best known work is Ma'alim fi-l-Tariq (Milestones), but the majority of Qutb's theory can be found in his Quranic commentary Fi zilal al-Qur'an (In the Shade of the Quran). For Qutb, the Quran was seen as the final arbiter in all matters relating to faith, while his main goal in writing the book, In the Shade of the Qur’an, was to restore the centrality of faith in the consciousness and imagination of Muslims, and to kindle a cognitive revolution that would bring about a political and social process that will lead to the renewal of the Islamic tradition.

Qutb's theoretical work on Islamic advocacy, social justice and education, has left a significant mark not only on the Muslim Brotherhood, but also Muslim scholars from all backgrounds : like the founder of the Syrian branch of the Muslim Brotherhood, Mustafa al-Siba'i, as well as the Indonesian Sunni scholar Hamka and the Iraqi Shia scholar Muhammad Baqir al-Sadr. Hekmatyar, one of the most influential Afghan Islamists, says that he precisely turned Islamist in 1966, after hearing the death of Qutb on radio. Ali al-Tamimi, considered "arguably the first American born activist Salafi preacher", has Qutb as one of his main intellectual influences. While Qutbist works remain popular amongst the Arab youth and political dissidents; the majority of Sunni Islamists currently view Qutb's proposals as outdated, impractical and prone to extremism.

His influence isn't limited to Sunnis either, as the former Supreme Leader of Iran, Ali Khamenei, translated his work into Persian. Having been translated into Persian from the 50s and 60s onward, and for his definitive influence on the Islamic revolution of Iran, a critical conference entitled Re-reading and Re-viewing the Views of Sayyid Quṭb, held in Tehran during 15–16 February 2015, has been described as "a vivid example of the living legacy of Sayyid Quṭb in today’s Iran."

=== Al-Qaeda and Islamic Jihad ===
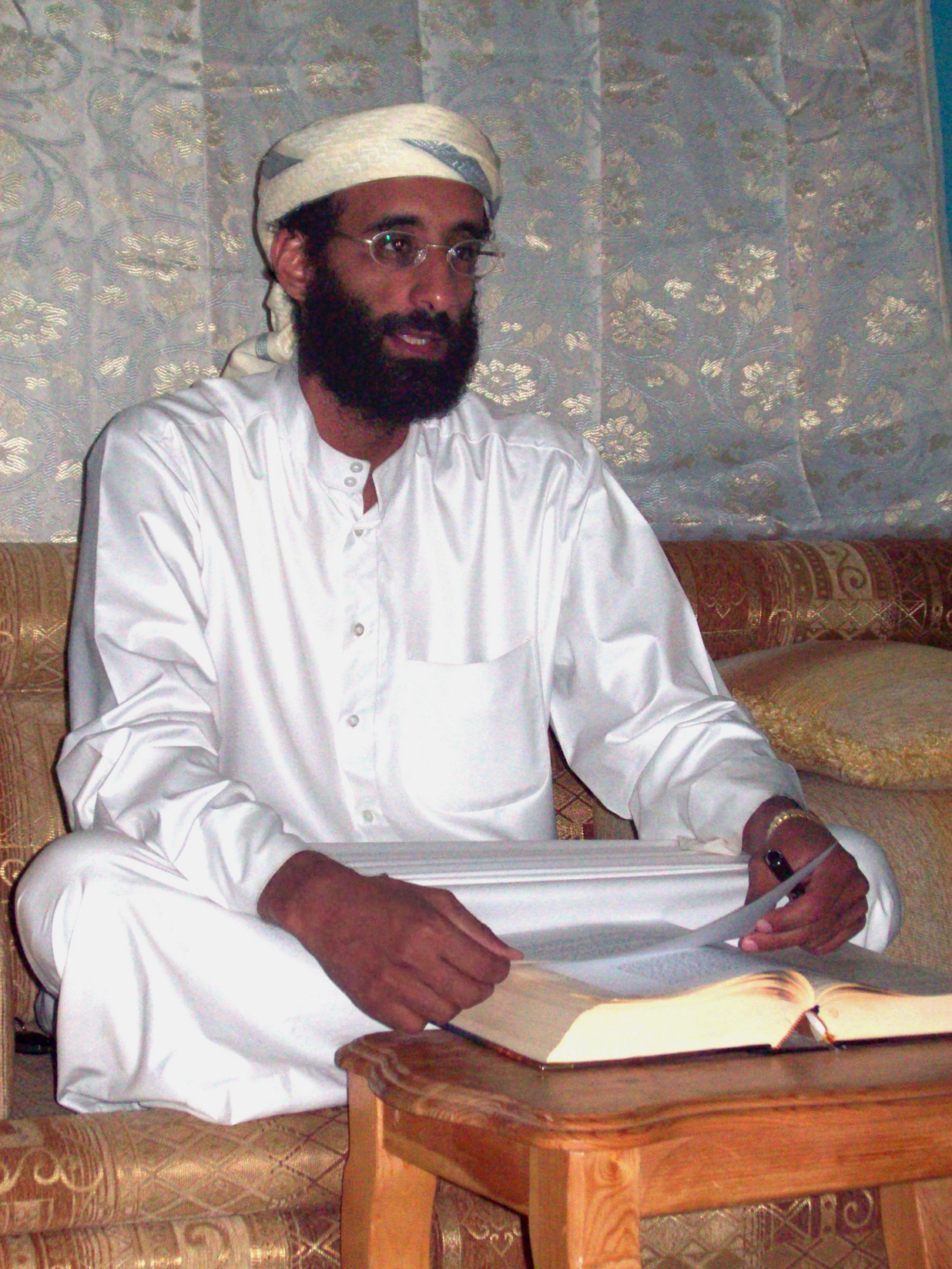
Anwar al-Awlaki

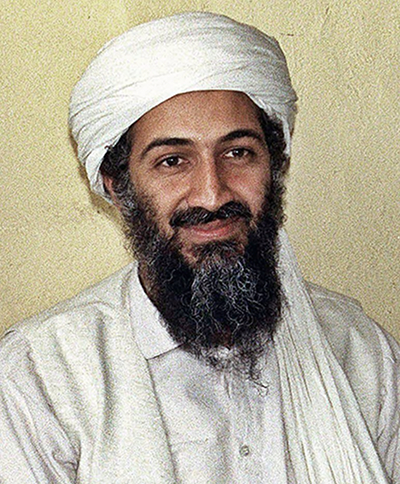
Osama bin Laden, founder and first leader of al-Qaeda

Qutb had influence on Islamic insurgent/terror groups in Egypt and elsewhere. His influence on al-Qaeda was felt through his writing, his followers and especially through his brother, Muhammad Qutb, who moved to Saudi Arabia following his release from prison in Egypt and became a professor of Islamic Studies and edited, published and promoted his brother Sayyid's work.

One of Muhammad Qutb's students and later an ardent follower was Ayman Al-Zawahiri, who went on to become a member of the Egyptian Islamic Jihad and later a mentor of Osama bin Laden and the second Emir of Al-Qaeda. Zawahiri was first introduced to Qutb by his uncle and maternal family patriarch, Mafouz Azzam, who was very close to Qutb throughout his life. Azzam was Qutb's student, then protégé, then personal lawyer and executor of his estate—one of the last people to see Qutb before his execution. According to Lawrence Wright, who interviewed Azzam, "young Ayman al-Zawahiri heard again and again from his beloved uncle Mahfouz about the purity of Qutb's character and the torment he had endured in prison." Zawahiri paid homage to Qutb in his work Knights under the Prophet's Banner. Acclaiming Qutb, Al-Zawahiri wrote:

"Sayyid Qutb underscored the importance of Tawheed (monotheism) in Islam, and that the battle between it and its enemies is at its core an ideological difference over the issue of the oneness of God. It is the issue of who has the power: God and his Shari’ah (Islamic law) or man-made, materialistic laws. Although ... Qutb ... was oppressed and tortured by Nasser’s regime ... (his) influence on young Muslims was paramount. (Sayyid) Qutb’s message was, and still is, to believe in the oneness of God and the supremacy of the divine path. This message fanned the fire of Islamic revolution against the enemies of Islam at home and abroad. The chapters of his revolution are renewing one day after another".

Osama bin Laden was also acquainted with Sayyid's brother, Muhammad Qutb. A close college friend of bin Laden's, Mohammed Jamal Khalifa, told Wright, that bin Laden regularly attended weekly public lectures by Muhammad Qutb, at King Abdulaziz University, and that he and bin Laden both "read Sayyid Qutb. He was the one who most affected our generation."

While imprisoned in Yemen, Anwar al-Awlaki became influenced by the works of Qutb. He would read 150–200 pages a day of Qutb's works, describing himself during the course of his reading as "so immersed with the author I would feel Sayyid was with me in my cell speaking to me directly." On the other hand, associate professor of history at Creighton University, John Calvert, states that "the al-Qaeda threat" has "monopolized and distorted our understanding" of Qutb's "real contribution to contemporary Islamism."

=== Influence on the 1979 Iranian Revolution ===
Qutb was an important source of influence to Ruhollah Khomeini and other Iranian Shia intellectuals leading up to the 1979 Iranian Revolution. In 1984, the Islamic Republic of Iran under Khomeini honoured Qutb's "martyrdom" by issuing an iconic postage stamp showing him behind bars. Qutb's works were translated by Iranian Islamists into Persian and enjoyed remarkable popularity both before and after the revolution. Prominent figures such as former Iranian Supreme Leader Ali Khamenei and his brother Muhammad Ali Khamenei, Ahmad Aram, Hadi Khosroshahi, etc. translated Qutb's works into Persian.

Although interest in Qutb's works had peaked during the years immediately following the Iranian revolution, Iranian intellectuals have become gradually opposed to Qutb and his militant ideas over the course of time. One source of criticism has been from the Iranian Shi'ite clergy who considered Qutb's ideas as being Sunni influenced and charged him with heresy due to sectarian reasons. Clerics such as Abū Faḍl Raẓavī Ardakānī, Sayyid Ibrāhīm Mīlānī, Morteza Mutahhiri, etc. wrote several treatises opposing the ideas of Qutb, his anti-clerical rhetoric and condemned those who spread his works in Iran.

In 2015, a youth organisation named "Kanoon Youth Thought Center" conducted a conference on Qutb's thought in Tehran. The conference was attended by major religious leaders and intellectuals of the Iranian revolution. Most of the participants expressed negative views on Qutb; considering him as a proponent of extremist ideas. Dr. Ali Akbar Alikhani, associate professor at Tehran University, argued that the Qutbist "binary worldview" that divided entire societies into Jahili (ignorant) and Tawhidi (monotheistic), Qutb's allegedly pessimistic view of justice, etc. generated vicious hatred against non-Muslims; culminating in the brutalities of terrorist groups such as the Islamic State (IS). Shi'ite scholar Ahmad Rahdar criticised Qutb's call to uncompromising militant action as serving the intellectual basis for Jihadist groups like Al-Qaeda, IS, etc. Historian Musa Najafi downplayed the role of Qutb's ideas in Iranian revolution and argued that revolutionary symbolism was inherent in Shi'ite scholarly tradition; which was channeled by Khomeini and his followers. Najafi characterised Qutb as a reactionary and sectarian scholar whose superficial and brisk solutions were always oriented towards mass Takfir (excommunication) and religious extremism. Although some non-clerical intellectuals continued attempts to defend him, Sayyid Qutb is viewed negatively amongst contemporary Khomeinist scholars in Iran.

=== Recognition in 9/11 Commission Report ===
Chapter 2 of the 9/11 Commission Report (2004), "The Foundation of the New Terrorism," cites Qutb for influencing Osama bin Laden's worldview in these terms:

"[Qutb] dismissed Western achievements as entirely material, arguing that 'nothing will satisfy its own conscience and justify its existence.'[n. 12]

"Three basic themes emerge from Qutb's writings. First, he claimed that the world was beset with barbarism, licentiousness, and unbelief (a condition he called jahiliyya, the religious term for the period of ignorance prior to the revelations given to the Prophet Mohammed). Qutb argued that humans can choose only between Islam and jahiliyya. Second, he warned that more people, including Muslims, were attracted to jahiliyya and its material comforts than to his view of Islam; jahiliyya could therefore triumph over Islam. Third, no middle ground exists in what Qutb conceived as a struggle between God and Satan. All Muslim – as he defined them – therefore must take up arms in this fight. Any Muslim who rejects his ideas is just one more nonbeliever worthy of destruction."

== Works ==
Literary

- Mahammat al-Sha'ir fi'l-Hayah wa Shi'r al-Jil al-Hadir (The Task of the Poet in Life and the Poetry of the Contemporary Generation), 1932
- al-Shati al-Majhul (The Unknown Beach), 1935
- Naqd Kitab: Mustaqbal al-Thaqafa fi Misr (Critique of a Book by Taha Husain: the Future of Culture in Egypt), 1939
- Al-Taswir al-Fanni fi'l-Qu'ran (Artistic Imagery in the Qur'an), 1945
- Al-Atyaf al-Arba'a (The Four Apparitions), 1945
- Tifl min al-Qarya (A Child from the Village), 1946
- Al-Madina al-Mashura (The Enchanted City), 1946
- Kutub wa Shakhsiyyat (Books and Personalities), 1946
- Askwak (Thorns), 1947
- Mashahid al-Qiyama fi'l-Qur'an (Aspects of Resurrection in the Qu'ran), 1946
- Al-Naqd al-Adabi: Usuluhu wa Manahijuhu (Literary Criticism: Its Foundation and Methods'), 1948
- "The America I Have Seen," 1949, reprinted in Kamal Abdel-Malek, ed., 2000, America in an Arab Mirror: Images of America in Arabic Travel Literature: An Anthology, Palgrave. PDF from Portland State University.

Theoretical

- Al-Adala al-Ijtima'iyya fi'l-Islam (Social Justice in Islam), 1949
- Ma'rakat al-Islam wa'l-Ra's Maliyya (The Battle Between Islam and Capitalism), 1951
- Al-Salam al-'Alami wa'l-Islam (World Peace and Islam), 1951
- Fi Zilal al-Qur'an (In the Shade of the Qur'an), first installment 1954
- Dirasat Islamiyya (Islamic Studies), 1953
- Hadha'l-Din (This Religion is Islam), n.d. (after 1954)
- Al-Mustaqbal li-hadha'l-Din (The Future of This Religion), n.d. (after 1954)
- Khasais al-Tasawwur al-Islami wa Muqawamatuhu (The Characteristics and Values of Islamic Conduct), 1960
- Al-Islam wa Mushkilat al-Hadara (Islam and the Problems of Civilization), n.d. (after 1954)
- Ma'alim fi'l-Tariq (Signposts on the Road, or Milestones), 1964 (Reviewed by Yvonne Ridley)
- Basic Principles of Islamic Worldview
- The Islamic Concept and Its Characteristics
- Islam and Universal Peace

Co-authored with others

- Al-Atyaf al-'Arba'ah (The Four Ghosts), 1945. Written with his siblings : Muhammad, Aminah and Hamidah
- Rawdah al-Atfal, n.d. Children's book written with Amīnah Saʻīd (1914–1995), a journalist and feminist, and Yūsuf Murād (1902–1966), a psychoanalyst who popularized Freud in Egypt and the Arab world.
- Al Jadid fi al-'Arabiyyah (The New [Approach to] Arabic Language), n.d. A textbook on Arabic language
- Al Jadid fi al-Mahfuzât (The New [Approach to] Arabic Literature), n.d. A textbook on Arabic literature
