= Milestones (book) =

1964 book by Sayyid Qutb

- Author: Sayyid Qutb
- Original title: Ma'alim fi al-Tariq
- Language: Arabic
- Publisher: Kazi Publications
- Publication date: 1964
- Publication place: Egypt
- Media type: Paperback
- ISBN: 1-56744-494-6
- OCLC: 55100829
- Dewey Decimal: 297.27
- LC Class: BP163 .Q813

Maʿālim fī aṭ-Ṭarīq, also Ma'alim fi'l-tareeq, (Arabic: معالم في الطريق, romanized: ma‘ālim fī t-tarīq) or Milestones, first published in 1964, is a short book written by the influential Egyptian Islamic author Sayyid Qutb, in which he makes a call to action and lays out a plan to re-create the "extinct" Muslim world on (what he believes to be) strictly Quranic grounds, casting off what he calls Jahiliyyah (pre-Islamic ignorance).

Ma'alim fi al-Tariq has been called "one of the most influential works in Arabic of the last half century." It is probably Qutb's most famous and influential work and one of the most influential Islamist tracts written. It has also become a manifesto for the ideology of "Qutbism." Commentators have both praised Milestones as a ground-breaking, inspirational work by a hero and a martyr.

English translations of the book are usually entitled simply "Milestones" (the book is also sometimes referred to in English as "Signposts"). The title Ma'alim fi al-Tariq translates into English as, "Milestones Along the Way," "Signposts on the Road," or different combinations thereof.

== History ==
Ma'alim fi al-Tariq marked the culmination of Qutb's evolution from modernist author and critic, to Islamist activist and writer, and finally to Islamist revolutionary and theoretician. First published in 1964, it was written in prison, where Qutb spent 10 years under charges of political conspiracy against the authoritarian Egyptian regime of Gamal Abdel Nasser. Four of its thirteen chapters were originally written for Qutb's voluminous Quranic commentary, Fi Zilal al-Qur'an (In the shade of the Qur'an).

Less than a year after its publication, Qutb was again arrested and brought to trial in Egypt under charges of conspiring against the state. Excerpts from the book were used to incriminate Qutb and he was found guilty, sentenced to death and executed by hanging in 1966. His death elevated his status to Shaheed or martyr in the eyes of many Muslims. Milestones became a bestseller and widely distributed across the Arab speaking world. As of 2001, close to 2,000 editions of the work are said to have been published.

== Contents ==
In his book, Qutb seeks to set out "milestones" or guiding markers along a road that will lead to the revival of Islam from its current "extinction."

=== Sharia ===
According to Qutb, the Muslim community has been "extinct for a few centuries" and has reverted to Jahiliyyah ("The state of ignorance of the guidance from God") because those who call themselves Muslims have failed to follow, "the laws of God," or Sharia, traditional Islamic law. Following the Sharia is not just important for Muslims, but a defining attribute, more necessary than belief itself, because, "according to the Shari'ah, 'to obey' is 'to worship'." This means Muslims must not only refrain from worshiping anything other than God, they must not obey anything other than God: "anyone who serves someone other than God"—be that someone (or something) a priest, president, a parliament, or a legal statute of a secular state— is "outside God's religion," although he may "claim to profess this religion."

Sharia is much more than a code of religious or public laws (according to Qutb), it is a "complete" way of life covering "all minor or major affairs of mankind," based on "submission to God alone," crowding out anything non-Islamic. Its rules range from "belief" to "administration and justice" to "principles of art and science." Being God's law, sharia is "as accurate and true as any of the laws known as the 'laws of nature,'" (the laws of physics--motion, gravity -- electricity, etc.), and part of the universal law "which governs the entire universe".

The modern Muslim world has erred by approaching the Qur'an for the sake of "discussion, learning and information" or "to solve some scientific or legal problem." In fact it should be approached as a source of "instruction for obedience and action" to remove man from the servitude of other men and place him in the servitude of God.

When the law of God is established on earth, it will lead to blessings falling on all mankind. Sharia is "the only guarantee" against "any kind of discord" in life, and will "automatically" bring "peace and cooperation" among individuals.

This harmony and perfection that frees men from servitude to other men means that rule of sharia will not be theocracy because its divine perfection means no human authorities, no government will be necessary to judge or enforce its law. Just as in the days of the Prophet Muhammad and his companions "the fear of God's anger" will take "the place of police and punishments." (Note: (However in other works Qutb does describe the ruler of the Islamic state, as a man (never a woman) who "derives his legitimacy from his being elected by the community and from his submission to God. He has no privileges over other Muslims, and is only obeyed as long as he himself adheres to the shari‘a".)) Offensive jihad to spread sharia-Islam throughout the non-Muslim world will not be aggression but "a movement... to introduce true freedom to mankind."

Knowledge of the "secrets of nature, its hidden forces and the treasures concealed in the expanses of the universe," will be revealed "in an easy manner." The "harmony between human life and the universe" of sharia law will approach the perfection of heaven itself. (Note: "This obedience to the Shari`ah becomes a necessity for human beings so that their lives may become harmonious and in tune with the rest of the universe .... when harmony between human life and the universe ensues, its results are not postponed for the next life but are operative even in this world. However, they will reach their perfection in the Hereafter.")

Just as sharia is—in Qutb's view—all encompassing and all wonderful, whatever is non-Muslim (or Jahiliyyah) is "evil and corrupt," and its existence anywhere intolerable to true Muslims. (Note: "Islam cannot accept or agree to a situation which is half-Islam and half-Jahiliyyah ... The mixing and co-existence of the truth and falsehood is impossible." "We will not change our own values and concepts either more or less to make a bargain with this jahili society. Never!") In preaching and promoting Islam, for example, it is very important not to demean Islam by "searching for resemblances" between Islam and the "filth" and "the rubbish heap of the West."

According to Qutb, to ignore this fact and attempt to introduce elements of socialism or nationalism into Islam or the Muslim community (as Nasser's Arab Socialist Union government was doing in Egypt at the time), is against Islam. This is illustrated by the fact that in the early days of Islam, the Prophet Muhammad did not make appeals to ethnic or class loyalty. Though these crowd-pleasing appeals would have undoubtedly shortened the thirteen years of hardship Muhammad had to endure while calling unresponsive Arabs to Islam, "God did not lead His Prophet on this course. ... This was not the way," and so must not be the way now.

=== Islamic vanguard ===
To restore Islam on earth and free Muslims from "jahili society, jahili concepts, jahili traditions and jahili leadership," Qutb preaches that a vanguard (tali'a) be formed modeling itself after the original Muslims, the companions (Sahaba) of Muhammad. Qutb believes these Muslims successfully vanquished Jahiliyyah principally in two ways:

- They cut themselves off from the Jahiliyyah—i.e. they ignored the learning and culture of non-Muslim groups (Greeks, Romans, Persians, Christians or Jews), and separated themselves from their old non-Muslim friends and family.
- They looked to the Qur'an for orders to obey, not as "learning and information" or solutions to problems.

Following these principles the vanguard will fight Jahiliyyah with a twofold approach: preaching, and "the movement" (jama'at). Preaching will persuade people to become true Muslims, while the movement will abolish "the organizations and authorities of the Jahili system" by "physical power and Jihaad". Foremost amongst these organizations and people to be removed is the "political power" which rests on a complex, "interrelated ideological, racial, class, social and economic support," but ultimately includes not only "the power of the state, the social system and traditions", but "the whole human environment." Force is necessary, Qutb explains, because it is naive to expect "those who have usurped the authority of God" to give up their power without a fight.

Remaining aloof from Jahiliyyah and its values and culture, but preaching and forcibly abolishing authority within it, the vanguard will travel the road, gradually growing from a cell of "three individuals" to ten, from ten to a hundred, until there are thousands, and blossom into a truly Islamic community. The community may start in the homeland of Islam but this is by no means "the ultimate objective of the Islamic movement of Jihad." Jihad can not merely be defensive, it must be offensive, and its objective must be to carry Islam "throughout the earth to the whole of mankind". This is not aggression, as Orientalists would lead you to believe, but necessary because "truth and falsehood cannot coexist on this Earth".

True Muslims should maintain a "sense of supremacy" and "superiority," on the road of renewal, and to remember their enemies are angered by them, hate them "only because of their faith", "only because they believe in God". And so it is important that they prepare themselves for a "life until death in poverty, difficulty, frustration, torment and sacrifice", and even to brace themselves for possibility of death by torture at the hands of Jahiliyyah's sadistic, arrogant, mischievous, criminal and degraded people. Qutb ends his book with quotes from "surat Al-Burooj" from the Quran, an example of persecution against Muslims and enjoining modern-day Muslims to endure the same or worse tortures for the sake of carrying out God's will. After all, "this world is not a place of reward"; the believer's reward is in heaven.

== Influences ==
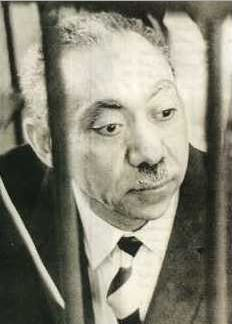
Sayyid Qutb on trial in 1966 under the Gamal Abdel Nasser regime

=== Islamic ===
Two of Qutb's major influences were the medieval Islamic scholar Ibn Taymiya, and contemporary British Indian (later Pakistani) Islamist writer Sayyid Abul Ala Maududi. Both used the historical term jahiliyya to describe contemporary events in the Muslim world.

Two other concepts popularized by Qutb in Milestones also came from Maududi:

- al-'ubudiyya, or worship, (which is performed not only by praying and adoring but by obeying); and
- al-hakimiyya, or sovereignty, (which is God's over all the earth and violated when His law, the sharia, is not obeyed).

Qutb's premise—that sharia law is essential to Islam, and that any self-described "Muslim" ruler who ignores it in favor of man-made laws is actually a non-Muslim who should be fought and overthrown—came from a fatwa of Ibn Taymiya. (Quran 5:44: "... and those who do not judge by what Allah has revealed are ˹truly˺ the disbelievers.")

=== Non-Islamic ===
Qutb's intense dislike of the West and ethnic nationalism notwithstanding, a number of authors believe he was influenced by European fascism (Roxanne L. Euben, Aziz Al-Azmeh, Khaled Abou El Fadl). (Note: "In Milestones he [Qutb] attempted to offer a description of the genuine Islamic society and the true Islamic faith, but in reality, Qutb's book did nothing more than attempt to add an Islamic veneer to a thoroughly fascist ideological construct.... Qutb provided a more detailed vision of the idealistic and utopian Islamic state. In this regard, Qutb, unlike Abd al-Wahhab, was influenced by Western thinkers, particularly the German fascist philosopher Carl Schmitt. Although Qutb does not once mention Schmidt in his works, a careful reading of Milestones on the Road reveals that many of Qutb's ideas, constructs and phrases are clearly adapted from the works of Schmidt.") Some of his ideas (with religion replacing race or ethnicity in its ideology), that have been compared to fascism include:

- the decline of contemporary Western civilization and "infertility" of democracy;
- inspiration from an earlier golden age and desire to restore its glory with an all-encompassing (totalitarian) social, political, and economic system;
- belief in malice of foreign and (especially) Jewish conspiracies;
- violent revolution to expel alien influences and to re-establish the power and international supremacy of the nation/community;

Although fascism made some impact among anti-British Arab Muslims before, during, and after World War II, the influence of fascist thinkers (particularly French fascist Alexis Carrel) in Qutb's work is disputed.

The centrality of an Islamic 'vanguard' (Arabic: tali'a) in Qutb's political program also suggests influence from Communist leader Vladimir I. Lenin's key concept of the vanguard party. (Note: "Although for obvious reason jihadi ideologues do not cite Lenin as an inspiration, their concepts and logic, especially Sayyid Qutb's betray this influence. Having been educated in Egypt in the 1940s, Qutb would certainly have been exposed to Lenin's writings. Two key concepts from Qutb come straight from Lenin: jama'a (vanguard) and manhaj (program).")

== Criticism ==
Qutb's book was originally a bestseller and became more popular as the Islamic revival strengthened. Islamists have hailed him as "a matchless writer, ... one of the greatest thinkers of contemporary Islamic thought," and compared to Western political philosopher John Locke. Egyptian intellectual Tariq al-Bishri has compared the influence of Milestones to Vladimir Lenin's pamphlet What Is To Be Done?, where the founder of modern Communism outlined his theories of how Communism would be different from socialism. Author Gilles Kepel credits Milestones with "unmasking" the socialist and "nominally" Islamic "faces" of the Egyptian regime of Gamal Abdel Nasser Qutb lived under.

Outside the Islamist context, however, Ma'alim fi-l-Tariq has been criticized by Muslims for the takfir of allegedly jahili Muslims, and by non-Muslims for its accusations against them.

=== Takfir ===
The claim that the entire world was jahiliyya meant that mainstream Muslims were not actually Muslims, which meant they were potentially guilty of apostasy, a capital crime in traditional sharia. Critics allege that Qutb's Milestones helped to open up a Pandora's box of takfir (by declaring that the Muslim world was actually non-Muslim and so many Muslims not actually Muslims, and potentially guilty of apostasy) that has brought serious internal strife, in particular terrorism and the killing of civilians, to the Muslim world in recent decades.

=== Christians and Jews as Polytheists ===
Qutb repeatedly proclaims that "serving human lords" is intolerable and is a practice Islam "has come to annihilate." Christians and Jews are guilty of it since they give priests and rabbis "the authority to make laws" and "it is clear that obedience to laws and judgments is a sort of worship." Because of this these religions are actually polytheist, not monotheist. (Note: "Qutb also challenged establishment Islam, which viewed jihad as primarily defensive and which preached tolerance toward Jews, Christians, and other `people of the book.` Milestones in effected reversed the historical trend toward equality among Muslim and non-Muslim citizens. It essentially restored the hierarchy of the premodern Ottoman era.") Qutb quotes the Quran (9:31):

“They have taken their rabbis and priests as lords other than Allah, and the Messiah, son of Mary; and they were commanded to worship none but One Allah. There is no God but He, glory be to Him above what they associate with Him!”

=== Western and Jewish Conspiracies ===
Qutb asserted that "World Jewry" was and is engaged in conspiracies whose "purpose" is:

to eliminate all limitations, especially the limitations imposed by faith and religion, so that Jews may penetrate into body politics of the whole world and then may be free to perpetuate their evil designs. At the top of the list of these activities is usury, the aim of which is that all the wealth of mankind end up in the hands of Jewish financial institutions which run on interest.

He also alleged that the West had a centuries-long "enmity toward Islam" which led it to create a "well-thought-out scheme ... to demolish the structure of Muslim society." At the same time, "the Western world realizes that Western civilization is unable to present any healthy values for the guidance of mankind," and in one Western country he had visited, "the American people blush" with shame when confronted with the "immoralities" and "vulgarity" of their own country in comparison with the superiority of Islam's "logic, beauty, humanity and happiness".

Olivier Roy has described Qutb's attitude as one of "radical contempt and hatred" for the West, and complains that the propensity of Muslims like Qutb to blame problems on outside conspiracies "is currently paralyzing Muslim political thought. For to say that every failure is the devil's work is the same as asking God, or the devil himself (which is to say these days the Americans), to solve one's problems."

=== Milestones and Islam ===
==== Sharia ====
Although Qutb's ideology is premised upon sharia law and its application to every aspect of life, he does not explain or illustrate how any specific statutes are better or different from man-made law. Evidence to support assertions in Ma'alim fi al-Tariq is limited to scriptural quotations — but does assure readers sharia is "without doubt ... perfect in the highest degree", and will free humanity from servitude to other men.

Some, such as scholar Khaled Abou El Fadl, have questioned Qutb's understanding of sharia, and his assumptions that sharia is not only perfect but accessible to mortals in its completeness. While Islamic scholars of sharia traditionally have two decade-long training from schools such as Al Azhar, all Qutb's formal post-secondary schooling was secular.

Qutb's assertion that the Qur'an should be approached as a source of "instruction for obedience and action" (following the fundamentalist prescription that "the Quran is our law,") comes under modernist criticism that of 6000 verses in the Quran only 245 concern legislation, and only 90 of those concern constitutional, civil, financial or economic matters. Qutb's general assertion that the sharia is all-encompassing — a "complete way of life" with rules on everything from "administration and justice" to "principles of art and science" — is challenged by the Modernist claim that sharia law (as revealed to man) is notably short on solutions to modern problems, be they traffic control, price stability, or health care.

==== Freedom ====
Qutb explains that sharia law needs no human authorities for citizens to obey and thus frees humanity from "servitude" because

- God's law has "no vagueness or looseness" which would necessitate judges to settle disputes over interpretation, and
- no need for enforcement authorities because "as soon as a command is given, the heads are bowed, and nothing more is required for implementation (of sharia) except to hear it."

This uniquely free socioeconomic system not only frees Muslims to be true Muslims, but explains why offensive jihad to "establish the sovereignty of God", i.e. true Islam, "throughout the world" would not constitute aggression towards non-Muslims but rather "a movement to wipe out tyranny" and to introduce "true freedom" to mankind, since even the most contented and patriotic non-Muslim living in a non-Muslim state is still obeying a human authority. These non-Muslims must be freed by Islamic jihad, just as the non-Muslims of Persia or Byzantium were freed by invading Muslim armies in the 7th Century AD.

The problem alleged here is that while true Muslims who believe in sharia law might in theory obey it without any state or police to enforce it, non-Muslims would have no such incentive, since by definition they do not consider Islamic law to be divine. However, if obedience were not voluntary, offensive jihad would lose the rationale Qutb claims for it as a movement to wipe out tyranny.

Qutb's political philosophy has been described as an attempt to instantiate a complex and multilayer eschatological vision, partly grounded in a counter-hegemonic anti-western view of Islamic 'universalism'.
