= John Calvert (scholar) =

Scholar on radical Islam

- Education: McGill University; American University in Cairo; University of Toronto; University of Alberta
- Occupations: Henry W. Casper, SJ Associate Professorship in History at Creighton University
- Notable work: Sayyid Qutb and the Origins of Radical Islamism
- Theological work
- Main interests: Radical Islam

John Calvert is the holder of the Henry W. Casper, SJ Associate Professorship in History at Creighton University. He is the author of several academic works on radical Islam, most notably one on the Islamist intellectual Sayyid Qutb entitled Sayyid Qutb and the Origins of Radical Islamism.

== Publications ==
- Calvert, John C.M. (1993). Discourse, Community and Power: Sayyid Qutb and the Islamic Movement in Egypt (Ph.D.). Montreal: McGill University Press. OCLC 36786737.
- Calvert, John (2008). Islamism: A Documentary and Reference Guide. Westport, Connecticut: Greenwood Press. In 349 libraries according to WorldCat
- Calvert, John (2010). Sayyid Qutb and the Origins of Radical Islamism. New York: Columbia University Press. In 416 libraries according to WorldCat
- Calvert, John (2010). Divisions within Islam. Broomall, Pennsylvania: Mason Crest Publishers. ISBN 9781422205334.
