= Jahiliyyah =

Islamic term for pre-Islamic Arabian society

Jāhiliyyah (Arabic: جاهلية) is an Arabic term in Islamic salvation history, often translated as Age of Ignorance. It refers to the pre-Islamic era of Arabia as a whole, or alternatively only the Hejaz, leading up to the lifetime of the prophet Muhammad.

The expression serves as a form of grand narrative to paint pre-Islamic Arabians as barbarians in a morally corrupt social order. Its people (the jahl, singular jāhil) are portrayed as lacking religious knowledge (ʿilm) and civilized qualities (ḥilm), resulting in practices of polytheism, idol worship, and alleged female infanticide. The narrative holds that these people characteristically had societies rife with tyranny, injustice, despotism, and anarchy, with prejudice resulting in vainglorious tribal antagonisms.

The pre-Islamic age was essentialized into a group of attributes and societal functions that was described as a barbaric way of life that stood in contrast with the mission of Muhammad and the way of life he introduced. Today, this narrative is not considered historical. As a grand narrative or master narrative, and as a discourse, it served the role of validating and even necessitating the venture of Islam. The Jahiliyyah is a type of light-versus darkness narrative, and is similar to grand narratives like the idea that the Dark Ages was succeeded by the Age of Enlightenment in European history or the idea that the coming of Jesus redeemed the world from original sin.

In modern Islamist writings, the concept is used to refer to a decadent moral state accused of imitating the Jahiliyyah. Islamists have used this concept of jahiliyyah to criticize un-Islamic conduct in the Muslim world. Prominent Muslim theologians Muhammad Rashid Rida and Abul A'la Maududi, among others, have used the term as a reference to secular modernity and, by extension, to modern Western culture. In his works, Maududi asserts that modernity is the "new jahiliyyah". Sayyid Qutb viewed jahiliyyah as a state of domination of humans over humans, as opposed to their submission to God. Likewise, radical Muslim groups have often justified the use of violence against secular regimes by framing their armed struggle as a jihad to strike down modern forms of jahiliyyah. Ibn Taymiyyah and Muhammad ibn Abd al-Wahhab have both viewed their fellow Muslims as living in a state of jahiliyyah.

== Etymology ==
The term jahiliyyah is derived from the Arabic verbal root jahala "to be ignorant or stupid, to act stupidly". It has been suggested that the word jahiliyyah in the Quran means "ignorant people", in contrast to traditionalist or contemporary notions of an "age" or "state of ignorance".

Jahiliyyah has been compared to the expression "times of ignorance" (agnoias) which occurs in Acts 17:29-30, where Paul describes the state of people before God's revelation.

== Traditional accounts of Jahili society ==
=== General ===
The following summary of Jahili society appears according to the sira of Ibn Ishaq:

we were an uncivilized people, worshipping idols, eating corpses, committing abominations. breaking natural ties, treating guests badly. and our strong devoured our weak. Thus we were until God sent us an apostle whose lineage, truth, trustworthiness, and clemency we know. He summoned us to acknowledge God's unity and to worship him and to renounce the stones and images which we and our fathers formerly worshipped. He commanded us to speak the truth, be faithful to our engagements, mindful of the ties of kinship and kindly hospitality, and to refrain from crimes and bloodshed. He forbade us to commit abominations and to speak lies, and to devour the property of orphans, to vilify chaste women.

In the Nahj al-Balāgha, Al-Sharif al-Radi (d. 1015) says that the pre-Islamic Arabs were:

camel-herders tending to their beasts’ sores and harvesting their wool. They lived as the most wretched of nations, with the least fertile fields, with no mission under whose wing they could seek shelter, no column of unity on whose strength they could depend. Their situation was volatile, their hands discordant, their numbers scattered. They were trapped in a hard trial and crushed under rocks of ignorance: they buried baby girls alive, worshipped idols, cut ties of kinship, and raided one another. Observe the abundance of God’s blessings [with the coming of Islam] on them [the Arabs]. He sent them a messenger [the Prophet Muhammad], secured their obedience through his religion [Islam], and gathered their company within his mission. See how bounty spread the wings of her generosity over them and the wellsprings of her delights flowed. See how the new religion gathered them within the gifts of its grace. They were immersed in its bounty, joyful in the fresh greenness of its way of life

=== Female infanticide ===
According to Islamic religious scholars, a regular practice during the Jahiliyyah was for Arabians to commit female infanticide by burying their daughters alive (which they called waʾd al-banāt). According to Al-Tha'labi (d. 1035) in his commentary on Quran 81:8:

When a man had a daughter and he wanted to spare her life, he would dress her in a garment of wool or hair, and [when she had grown up] she would watch over his camels and sheep in the steppe. If he wanted to kill her, he would let her live until she was six spans in length (sudāsiyyah) and then say to her mother, “Perfume and adorn her, for I will take her to meet her relatives.” [Instead,] he had dug a pit for her in the desert where he would take her. He would say to her, “Look there.” Then he would push her into it from her back and pour earth over her until the ground was even … Ibn ʿAbbās has said that when a pregnant woman was about to give birth during the jāhiliyyah, she would dig a grave and give birth next to it. If it was a daughter, she would cast her in the grave, and if it was a son, she would keep him.

According to another source, "[e]very day a pit was dug in the corner of the desert for an innocent girl to be buried". Ilkka Lindstedt argues that notions of this practice in the jahiliyyah derived as an inference of two verses in the Quran (16:57–59, 81:8–9). Lindstedt, however, argues that there is little evidence to support such a practice in pre-Islamic Arabia and that the Quranic verses themselves are unlikely to have originally carried this meaning.

=== Warfare and violence ===
During the early Umayyad era, intense intertribal competition took place to acquire appointments of generalships and governorships over newly conquered territories. It is thought that it was around this time that widespread Islamic critiques began taking the place of partisan tribalism (ʿaṣabiyyah). These critiques were then attributed to Muhammad in order to describe and discredit ʿaṣabiyyah as a defining characteristic of the Jahiliyyah.

Other extreme and violent practices attributed to the Jahiliyyah included cannibalism, corpse mutilation, abuse and torture of captives, and random murder. In one tradition, Muhammad's uncle, Hamza ibn Abd al-Muttalib, is killed in the Battle of Uhud: subsequently, the jahl mutilated his corpse. Muhammad, by contrast, forbade the mutilation of corpses. They were also said to have tortured some Muslim prisoners they captured.

=== Nihāya ===
A practice regularly attributed to the Jahiliyyah was overly emotional wailing over the death of loved ones (niyāḥa), contrasted in tradition with the more civilized and rational Islamic practice of accepting the inevitability of death without excessive displays of emotion. G.H.A. Juynboll demonstrated that Islamic attitudes towards niyāḥa were far from uniform and that the absolute prohibition against it emerged in Iraq in the second half of the eighth century before being retrojected into Prophetic hadith. In a later study, Leor Halevi diverged from Juynboll in arguing that niyāḥa was a genuine pre-Islamic practice as opposed to an Islamic-era creation, although Halevi agreed with Juynboll that it was not prohibited by Muhammad. Peter Webb's most recent study agrees that it was a practice that occurred in pre-Islamic times due to its mention in pre-Islamic poetry, but he also argued that Islamic-era authors exaggerated the features of the custom and reshaped it into a quintessential trait of the "Jahili" past...

=== Prostitution ===
According to the Ibadi author Hūd ibn al-Muªakkam, the Jahiliyyah was characterized as a time when people forced their female slaves into prostitution so that they could have more children. Al-Qummī, a Shia, says that slaves were forced into prostitution for the profit of their master.

== Jahili poetry ==
Pre-Islamic Arabic poetry is called al-shiʿr al-Jāhilī ("poetry from the Jahiliyyah" or "Jahili poetry"). A large amount of this poetry was codified in Islamic times, and the Jahiliyyah was commonly characterized or received through this poetry. While historians doubt that the values of this poetry were representative of pre-Islamic values more broadly, the themes of Jahili poetry emphasize a heroic value system where the enjoyment of wine, amorous adventures, and fighting came together, as can be seen in the muʿallaqa of Ṭarafa:

If you can’t avert from me the fate that surely awaits me / then pray leave me to hasten it on with what money I’ve got. / But for three things, that are the joy of a young fellow / I assure you I wouldn’t care when my deathbed visitors arrive— / first, to forestall my charming critics with a good swig of crimson wine / that foams when the water is mingled in; / second, to wheel at the call of the beleaguered a curved-shanked steed / streaking like the wolf of the thicket you’ve startled lapping the water; / and third, to curtail the day of showers, such an admirable season / dallying with a ripe wench under the pole-propped tent, / her anklets and her bracelets seemingly hung on the boughs / of a pliant, unriven gum-tree or a castor-shrub.

According to Pamela Klasova, the values expressed should not be seen as "values in themselves". That is, they are values invoked by the poet as a vehicle for the expression of the heroic refusal of the poet to surrender themselves to the power of unpredictable fate. When wine, fighting, and so forth are celebrated, these are acts of defiance against death. For the poet, death can come at any moment, and so the poet hastens death by behaving in an unrestrained manner. This perception of the world extends to other areas of the life of the poet, and so he acts with extreme generosity to others, even at the risk of endangerment of one's own life. After all, the poet sees death as inevitable, and the only form of immortality achievable is through the memory of oneself after their death. This memory is perpetuated by the performance of heroic and honorable deeds. Wars were opportunities for one to set themselves apart from others by demonstrating their courage and achieving glory. Thus, poetry portrays war as something that occurs not merely out of necessity and material gain but also "for the noble strife itself". Poetry centred the present, but in a manner that was motivated by a deeper existential framework as opposed to barbarism. Tradition depicted the poets as pagan, but the poetry itself lacks concern for religion.

Pre-Islamic poetry is not representative of the values of pre-Islamic Arabia (and likely was an expression of one cultural model among nomads and/or seminomads), but it came to be depicted in this way likely for two reasons: the scarcity of other pre-Islamic sources to have survived into the Islamic era, and deliberate reconstructions of the "Jahiliyyah".

== Evolution of the Jahiliyyah narrative ==
=== Pre-Islamic Arabic poetry ===
The term with the root j-h-l is cited several times in pre-Islamic Arabic poetry, especially in the poetry of Imru' al-Qais and Al-Nabighah al-Dhubyani (where it is used eight and six times respectively). The meaning of the word in these poems is disputed. According to Ignaz Goldziher and Toshihiko Izutsu, the word meant "barbarism" and was used as an antonym (opposite) of ḥilm (forbearance, equanimity). Franz Rosenthal argued that it meant ignorance and was used as an opposite of ʿilm (religious knowledge). Peter Webb has accepted both of these definitions, finding different contexts in which each is the more appropriate definition.

=== Quran ===
The term jahiliyyah appears four times in the Quran (3:154, 5:50, 33:33, 48:26). In the Quran, the word is not used to refer to a historical epoch, but instead characterizes a way of life ascribed to the disbelievers who, in their ignorance, failed to acknowledge the message of Muhammad. For example, Muhammad emphasized the reward of the afterlife, whereas those who rejected his message lacked a belief in an afterlife entirely. The use of the word jahiliyyah in Islamic literature from later centuries therefore diverged from the way that the word was used in the Quran in three key ways: (1) It came to refer to a historical epoch instead of a way of life or a moral state of being (2) It came to be used to refer to Arabs generally instead of Muhammad's opponents (3) It came to be associated with a recurring set of particular negative stereotypes. The transformation of this term into a historical era may have been driven by Quran 33:33, which talks about former times in which jahiliyyah prevailed.

=== Classical Arabic dictionaries ===
Early Arabic dictionaries stressed two features of jahiliyyah: a specific period between two prophets (Al-Fatra, sometimes more narrow as the time between Jesus and Muhammad) and the opposition between jahiliyyah and ʿilm. These approaches are found in the earliest surviving Arabic dictionary, the Kitab al-'Ayn of Al-Khalil ibn Ahmad al-Farahidi, as well as the dictionaries of Ibn Qutayba (d. 889) and Al-Azharī (d. 980). These sources do not confine the jahiliyyah to Arabia or attach particular disordered characteristics to it. For some, the word could also be used to refer to a future time of religious ignorance (especially the time leading up to the apocalypse) or it could be used to refer to a set of quantified time periods: for Al-Tabari in the tenth century, it denoted both Arabia before Muhammad and Palestine before Jesus. In the twelfth century and on, a new style of definition is adopted for the jahiliyyah, as is seen by the works of al-Zamakhshari and al-Ḥimyarī. Jahiliyyah began to be used to describe the non-Islamic past in general instead of the time between prophets, especially one lacking in or in opposition to moral virtue. With the Lisān al-ʿArab of Ibn Manzur (d. 1312), the word is constricted to pre-Islamic Arabs in particular in addition to their negative moral characteristics. Ibn Manzur's definition is the one found in dictionaries today.

=== Quran commentaries ===
The meaning of jahiliyyah experiences a similar evolution in exegeses of the Quran as they do in Arabic dictionaries. In the eighth-century commentary by Muqatil ibn Sulayman, the jahiliyyah describes the recent pre-Islamic past instead of pre-Islamic times in its entirety. In the commentaries of Al-Tabari, the word describes a period between prophets and the moral code of the non-Muslim community. The commentaries of Al-Zamakhshari and Al-Qurtubi in the twelfth and fourteenth centuries introduce the phrase al-Jahiliyyah understood as a period of time whose inhabitants were morally tarred by virtue of the era they lived in. Related phrases in this context included millat al-Jāhiliyya (the religious community of al-Jāhiliyya) and ahl al-Jāhiliyya (the people of al-Jāhiliyya). Both exegetes characterize Al-Jahiliyyah as the pre-Islamic past as a whole and not the time between any two prophets. Al-Qurtubi expands on the qualities of this era, such as fanaticism, idol worship, and rule by the strong over the weak.

=== Positive portrayals ===
A more optimistic version of the jahiliyyah narrative can be found among many authors in the second and third centuries of Islam during the early Abbasid period. In this period, where Arab tribal identity continued to be important, many sought to extol their genealogical ancestors as opposed to denigrating them, as can be found with the Ma'add or South Arabian ancestries. For many, especially poets and philologists, the jahiliyyah was a heroic era that gave rise to both pure Arabic and pre-Islamic Arabic poetry, crafted by renowned poets such as Imru' al-Qais and others. Continuity is emphasized instead of discontinuity between Jahiliyyah and Islam, including in areas of religion. As such, pre-Islamic ethics are seen as praiseworthy, laudatory, and the basis of Arabness. Individuals (hanifs) or entire tribes maintained the monotheism introduced by Abraham or Ishmael, and rites such as the Hajj (pilgrimage to Mecca) were maintained throughout this time period. Lists of the merits of the Arabs from this time period were written. The Musannaf of Ibn Abi Shaybah contains a mix of positive and negative hadith about the Jahiliyyah. Positive hadith condone various unique Jahili rituals and legal practices. Pre-Islamic or "Jahili" poets were described as being superior to contemporary poets (conversely, present-day poets were described as being inferior), and they were erected as the standards by which poets of the present day were compared to.

== Jahiliyyah concept in contemporary theology ==
During the 1930s, militant Islamist movements began to increasingly assert that Islamic civilisation was threatened by the encroachment of Western values. At this juncture, the concept of Jahiliyya was revived by leading Islamic scholars Sayyid Rashid Rida (d.1935 C.E/ 1354 A.H) and Abul A'la Maududi (d. 1979 C.E/ 1399 A.H); both of whom equated the modern Western culture and its values with Jahiliyya. The notion was revived by prominent scholars of twentieth-century Egypt and South Asia; regions that were being impacted by increasing Westernization. These scholars saw in the doctrines of classical theologians like Ibn Taymiyya (d. 1328 C.E/ 728 A.H), Ibn Qayyim (d. 1350 C.E/ 751 A.H), Ibn Kathir (d. 1373 C.E/ 774 A.H), etc. various remedies to the influx of foreign cultural influences.

Syrian-Egyptian Salafi theologian Rashid Rida was the first major 20th-century Islamist scholar to revive Ibn Taymiyya's ideas. He described those "geographical Muslims" who nominally adhere to Islam without disavowing the man-made laws as being upon the conditioning of Jahiliyyah. Rida asserts in Tafsir al-Manar that the Qur’ānic verse 5:44 condemning those who don't judge by Sharia (Islamic Law) refers to:

".. those Muslim [rulers] who introduce novel laws today and forsake the Shari'a enjoined upon them by God. . . . They thus abolish supposedly 'distasteful’ penalties such as cutting off the hands of thieves or stoning adulterers and prostitutes. They replace them with man-made laws and penalties. He who does that has undeniably become an infidel."

Abul A'la Maududi, characterized modernity with its values, lifestyles, and political norms as the "new Jahiliyyah" which was incompatible with Islam. Such criticisms of modernity were taken up in the emerging anti-colonialist rhetoric, and the term gained currency in the Arab world through translations of Maududi's work. The concept of modern Jahiliyyah attained wide popularity through a 1950 work by Maududi's student Abul Hasan Nadvi, titled What Did the World Lose Due to the Decline of Islam? Expounding Maududi's views, Nadvi wrote that Muslims were to be held accountable for their predicament because they came to rely on alien, un-Islamic institutions borrowed from the West.

In Egypt, Sayyid Qutb popularized the term in his influential work Ma'alim fi al-Tariq "Milestones", which included the assertion that "the Muslim community has been extinct for a few centuries."

When a person embraced Islam during the time of the Prophet, he would immediately cut himself off from Jahiliyyah. When he stepped into the circle of Islam, he would start a new life, separating himself completely from his past life under ignorance of the Divine Law. He would look upon the deeds during his life of ignorance with mistrust and fear, with a feeling that these were impure and could not be tolerated in Islam! With this feeling, he would turn toward Islam for new guidance; and if at any time temptations overpowered him, or the old habits attracted him, or if he became lax in carrying out the injunctions of Islam, he would become restless with a sense of guilt and would feel the need to purify himself of what had happened, and would turn to the Quran to mold himself according to its guidance. — Sayyid Qutb

In his commentary on verse 5:50 of the Quran, Qutb wrote:

Jahiliyya [...] is the rule of humans by humans because it involves making some humans servants of others, rebelling against service to God, rejecting God's divinity (ulahiyya) and, in view of this rejection, ascribing divinity to some humans and serving them apart from God. [...] People—in any time and any place—are either governed by God's shari'a—entirely, without any reservations—accepting it and submitting to it, in which case they are following God's religion, or they are governed by a shari'a invented by humans, in whatever form, and accept it. In that case they are in jahiliyya [...]

Qutb further wrote: "The foremost duty of Islam in this world is to depose Jahiliyyah from the leadership of man, and to take the leadership into its own hands and enforce the particular way of life which is its permanent feature."

Use of the term for modern Muslim society is usually associated with Qutb's other radical ideas (or Qutbism) -- namely that reappearance of Jahiliyya is a result of the lack of Sharia law, without which Islam cannot exist; that true Islam is a complete system with no room for any element of Jahiliyya; that all aspects of Jahiliyya ("manners, ideas and concepts, rules and regulations, values and criteria") are "evil and corrupt"; that Western and Jewish conspiracies are constantly at work to destroy Islam, etc.

The Islamist group Hizb ut-Tahrir adds the concept of the caliphate to that of shariah law to insist that the Muslim world has been living in jahiliyya since the last caliphate was abolished in 1924 and will not be free of it until the caliphate is restored.

== See also ==
- Glossary of Islam
- Outline of Islam
- Index of Islam-related articles
- Arabic poetry
- Pre-Islamic Arabia
- Rahmanan
- Takfir
- Hanif
- Year Zero (political notion)
- Al-Dukhul and Hummel Mountains
