= Fi Zilal al-Quran =

Quranic commentary by Sayyid Qutb

- Author: Sayyid Qutb
- Original title: في ظِلالِ القرآن
- Language: Arabic
- Subject: Quranic commentary
- Genre: Islamic literature
- Publication date: 1951-1965
- Publication place: Egypt
- Media type: Print (Hardcover)
- Pages: 30 volumes

Fi Zilal al-Qur'an (Arabic: في ظِلالِ القرآن, romanized: Fī Ẓilāl al-Qurʾān, lit. 'In the Shade of the Qur'an') is a highly influential commentary of the Qur'an, written during 1951-1965 by the Egyptian revolutionary Sayyid Qutb (1906-1966), a leader within the Muslim Brotherhood. He wrote (or re-wrote) most of the original 30 volumes (114 Surahs) while in prison following an attempted assassination of Egyptian president Gamal Abdel Nasser in 1954. The book outlines Qutb's vision of a Muslim state and society.

The work extends to 30 volumes that correspond to the 30 juz' parts of the Qur'an. It has been translated into several languages, including English, French, German, Urdu, Turkish, Indonesian, Persian, Hindi, Malayalam and Bengali. The full set of volumes covers the entire Qur'an.

== Contents ==
From a social and political standpoint, some of the more important conclusions Qutb drew in his interpretation include:

- On freedom of religion: Islam came to declare and establish the great universal principle that: "There shall be no compulsion in religion. The right way is henceforth distinct from error." (Verse 256) This reflects the honour God has reserved for man and the high regard in which man's will, thought and emotions are held, and the freedom he is granted to choose his beliefs, and the responsible position he is afforded to be judge of his own actions. Here lies the essence of human emancipation which 20th-century authoritarian and oppressive ideologies and regimes have denied mankind. Modern man has been deprived of the right to choose and live other than according to what is dictated by the state, using the full force of its colossal machinery, laws and powers. People are today given the choice only to adhere to the secular state system, which does not allow for a belief in God as the Creator and Master of the world, or to face annihilation. Freedom of belief is the most basic right that identifies man as a human being. To deny anyone this right is to deny him or her humanity. Freedom of belief also implies the freedom to express and propagate one's belief without fear of threat or persecution; The Quran asserts this. Islam gives everyone the right to exercise freedom of expression as long as they do not intrude upon the freedom and dignity of other people. There is no place for the propagation of evil and wickedness in Islam.
- On the issue of human relationships:

Allah wishes human life to be elevated, happy, based on pure motives and characterised by mutual compassion, brotherhood and purity of hearts and behaviour.

- On the Victimization of Children of Israel by the Pharaoh:

Tyrants are always ready to commit any crime, without hesitation, in order to retain power....That is tyranny: ignorant and stupid, but at the same time arrogant and conceited.

The Children of Israel suffered persecution on a similar scale by Pharaoh and his clique, as stated in Sūrah 28, The Story, in which we read: "Pharaoh made himself a tyrant in the land. He divided his people into casts, one group of which he persecuted, putting their sons to death and sparing only their daughters. Truly, he was an evildoer." (28: 4). This is characteristic of tyranny everywhere, in all periods of history. It still resorts today to the same methods it employed centuries ago.

- Opposition to Theocracy:

Establishing the rule of God on earth does not mean that sovereignty is assigned to a particular group of people, as was the case when the Church wielded power in Christian Europe, or that certain men become spokesmen for the gods, as was the case under theocratic rule.

- On Equality:

It is only under this system that God’s law applies equally and in the same way to all people, rulers and ruled, white and black, rich and poor.

- The importance of implementing true Islamic law and danger of people who "oppose the implementation of God's law." These are people "who claim to be Muslims but perpetrate corruption,"
- Jews as a perpetual opponent of Islam. The threat Jews pose to Islam is emphasized in Qutb's commentary on Surah 2:

The war the Jews began to wage against Islam and Muslims in those early days has raged on to the present. The form and appearance may have changed, but the nature and means remains the same.

Again, in the commentary on Surah 5:

The Muslim world has often faced problems as a result of Jewish conspiracies ever since the early days of Islam. ...

History has recorded the wicked opposition of the Jews to Islam right from its first day in Medina. Their scheming against Islam has continued since then to the present moment, and they continue to be its leaders, nursing their wicked grudges and always resorting to treacherous schemes to undermine Islam.

Conservative author Paul Berman stated that "In Qutb's interpretation, the sins and crimes of the Medina Jews in the seventh century have a cosmic, eternal quality -- rather like the sins and crimes of the Jerusalem Jews in some of the traditional interpretations of the Gospels."

== See also ==
- List of Sunni books
- Milestones
