= Musha, Egypt =

Musha
- Location in Egypt
- Coordinates: 27°07′N 31°14′E
- Country: Egypt
- Governorate: Asyut Governorate
- Time zone: UTC+2 (EET)
  - Summer (DST): UTC+3 (EEST)

Musha (Arabic: موشا, from Coptic: ⲡⲙⲟⲩϣⲉ, lit. 'repository') is a village in the Asyut Governorate, Egypt.

It is the birthplace of the author and Islamist Sayyid Qutb. The Nicholas S. Hopkins Collection includes photographs of Musha from the 1980s.
