= Takfir =

Form of excommunication in Islam

Takfir (Arabic: تَكْفِير, romanized: takfīr) is an Arabic and Islamic term which denotes excommunication from Islam of one Muslim by another, i.e., accusing another Muslim of being an apostate. The word is found neither in the Quran nor in the hadith literature; instead, kufr ("unbelief") and kafir ("unbeliever") and other terms employing the same triliteral root K-F-R appear.

Since according to the traditional interpretations of Islamic law (Sharia), the punishment for apostasy is the death penalty, and potentially a cause of strife and violence within the Muslim community (Ummah), an ill-founded takfir accusation was a major forbidden act (haram) in Islamic jurisprudence, with one hadith declaring that one who wrongly declares a Muslim an unbeliever is himself not an apostate but rather one who has committed a minor shirk. In the history of Islam, a sect originating in the 7th century CE known as the Kharijites carried out takfir against both Sunni and Shia Muslims, and became the main source of insurrection against the early caliphates for centuries. Traditionally, the only group authorized to declare another Muslim a kafir are the scholars of Islam (Ulama), which affirm that all the prescribed legal precautions should be taken before declaring takfir, and that those who profess the Islamic faith should be exempt.

Starting in the mid-to-late 20th century, some individuals and organizations in the Muslim world began to apply takfir accusations not only against those that they perceived as stray deviant and lapsed Muslims, but also governments and in some cases, societies as well. In his widely influential book Milestones, Egyptian Islamist ideologue Sayyid Qutb preached that governments ruling the Muslim world had fallen into a state of collective apostasy or jahiliyyah (a state of pre-Islamic ignorance) several centuries ago, having abandoned the use of Sharia. Qutb held that without Sharia law Islam cannot exist. Qutb affirmed that since Muslim government leaders (along with being cruel and evil) were actually not Muslims but apostates preventing the revival of Islam, the use of "physical force" should be used to remove them. This radical Islamist ideology, called "takfirism", has been widely held and applied by numerous Islamic extremists, terrorists, and jihadist organizations in the late 20th and early 21st-centuries, to varying degrees.

Since the latter half of the 20th century, takfir has also been used for "sanctioning violence against leaders of Islamic states" who do not enforce sharia or are otherwise "deemed insufficiently religious". Politically motivated arbitrary declarations of takfir became a "central ideology" of Egyptian-based Jihadist organizations, which were inspired by the ideas of the medieval Islamic scholars Ibn Taymiyyah and Ibn Kathir, and those of the modern Islamist ideologues Sayyid Qutb and Abul A'la Maududi. Some Salafi jihadist insurgent organizations such as Takfir wal-Hijra, GIA, Boko Haram, and the Islamic State, have been engaged in radical Takfiri discourse. Their practice of takfir has been denounced as deviant by the mainstream schools of Islam and various leaders such as Hasan al-Hudaybi (d. 1977) and Yusuf al-Qaradawi.

== Etymology and terminology ==
The Arabic terms kufr ("unbelief") and kāfir ("unbeliever"), alongside other terms employing the same triliteral root k-f-r, are found both in the Quran and the hadith literature, but the term takfīr used to declare another Muslim as kāfir is found in neither. "The word takfīr was introduced in the post-Quranic period and was first done by the Khawarij", according to J. E. Campo.

The act which precipitates takfir is termed mukaffir. A Muslim who declares another Muslim to be an unbeliever or apostate is a takfīri ("excommunicational"). It is prohibited to do without court and 12 years of Islamic studies.

== Authority and conditions ==
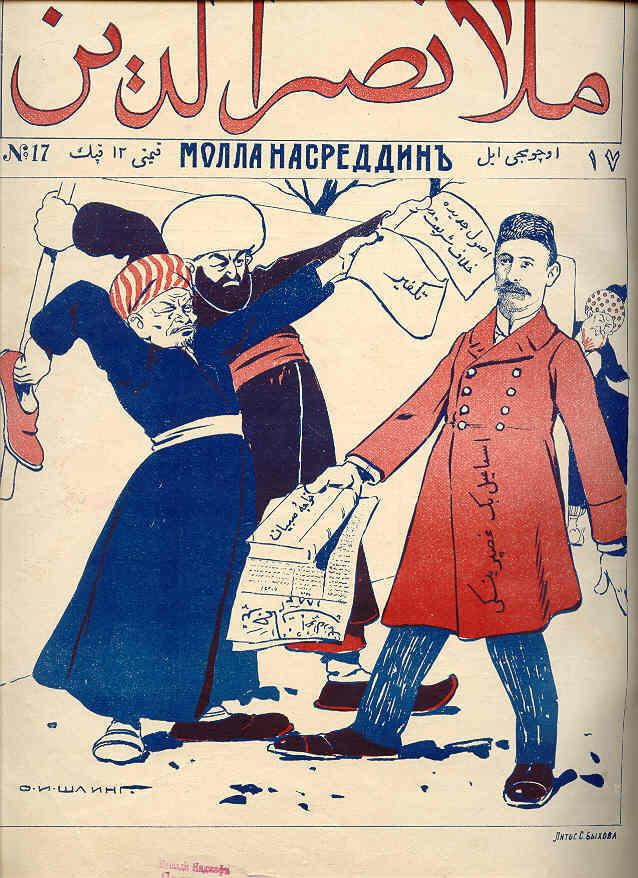
Caricature of the Crimean Tatar educator and intellectual Ismail Gasprinsky (on the right), leader of the Jadid movement, depicted holding the newspaper Terjuman ("The Translator") and the textbook Khoja-i-Sübyan ("The Teacher of Children") in his hand. Two men, respectively Tatar and Azerbaijani Muslim clerics, are threatening him with takfīr and sharīʿah decrees (on the left). From the satirical Azerbaijani magazine Molla Nasreddin, no. 17, 28 April 1908, Tbilisi (illustrator: Oskar Schmerling).

Legitimate authority and conditions that permit the issuance of takfīr are major points of contention among Muslim scholars. The declaration of takfīr typically applies to a judgement that an action or statement by the accused Muslim indicates his/her knowing abandonment of Islam. In many cases an Islamic court or a religious leader, an ʿālim must pronounce a fatwa (legal judgement) of takfīr against an individual or group.

The medieval Islamic scholar al-Ghazali "is often credited with having persuaded theologians, in his Faysalal-Tafriqa (The Criterion of Distinction between Islam and Clandestine Unbelief) that takfīr is not a fruitful path and that utmost caution is to be taken in applying it." In general, the official Muslim clergy considers that Islam does not sanction excommunication of Muslims who profess their Islamic faith and perform the ritual pillars of Islam. This is due to the fact that takfir that successfully convinces the judges (or Muslim vigilantes) of the accused being an apostate, traditionally leads to punishments of killing, confiscation of their property, and denial of Islamic burial. Ulamas often raise objections by asking rhetorical questions of who holds the right to excommunicate others, on what religious criteria it should be based, and what level of specialized knowledge in Islamic jurisprudence (fiqh) is required for the qualification of authority.

Some Muslims consider takfīr to be a prerogative only of either Muhammad – who does that through divine revelation and is no longer alive to do it – or of a state which represents the collectivity of the Ummah (the Muslim community).

An example given of the reluctance of Muslims to takfir is the refusal of authorities at Al-Azhar University to takfir ISIL/ISIS/Daesh in 2015 despite that group's notorious takfir atrocities; and the refusal of "many mainstream Muslims" to takfir the Kharijites, despite this sect being "unanimously regarded as the arch-takfiris" by scholars.

=== Examples ===
Examples of takfir spreading once takfir is accepted in a Muslim community include:

- The Saudi Arabian fatwa website IslamQA.info gave as an example of over-zealous takfir "deviants" a group who "kept away from Jumu'ah (Friday prayer) and Salah al jamaa'ah (congregational prayer) and regarded the Muslims in that land"—the 19th century community on the Arabian peninsula who followed the teachings of Muhammad ibn Abd al-Wahhab – "as disbelievers". (Note: Description of Abd al-Latif ibn Abd al-Rahman (1810–1876) Head of religious estate in 1860 and early 1870s.) Ibn 'Abd al-Wahhaab himself was noted for teachings whose "pivotal idea" was that "Muslims who disagreed with his definition of monotheism were not heretics, that is to say, misguided Muslims, but outside the pale of Islam altogether." (Note: "Most Muslims throughout history have accepted the position that declaring this profession of faith [the shahada] makes one a Muslim. One might or might not regularly perform the other obligatory rituals ... but ... any shortcomings would render one a sinner, not an unbeliever. Muhammad ibn Abd al-Wahhab did not accept that view. He argued that the criterion for one's standing as either a Muslim or an unbeliever was correct worship as an expression of belief in one God. ... any act or statement that indicates devotion to a being other than God is to associate another creature with God's power, and that is tantamount to idolatry (shirk). Muhammad ibn Abd al-Wahhab included in the category of such acts popular religious practices that made holy men into intercessors with God. That was the core of the controversy between him and his adversaries, including his own brother.)
- Islamist youth incarcerated for alleged extremism in Egypt in the mid-1960s agreed with the theory set forth in Sayyid Qutb's book Milestones that Islam was extinct since sharia law was not being enforced in the "Muslim" world, and that the right response was to withdraw from "Muslim" society in preparation for the overthrow of the secular regime. However they disagreed over whether their detachment should be "total" (i.e. a low profile but not secret existence on the margins of society) or "spiritual" (i.e. kept secret from other Muslims until they were a stronger force). The groups mutually declared takfir on each other and "refused to greet one another, and sometimes even came to blows". (Note: The spiritual detachment group called itself jama'a al-'uzla al-sh'uriyya, the "total separation" group preached mufasala kamila. They were incarcerated at the Abu Za'bal "concentration camp".)

=== Characteristics of apostasy in classical Islam ===
Traditionally, Islamic jurists did not formulate general rules for establishing unbelief, instead compiling sometimes lengthy lists of statements and actions which in their view were grounds for a takfir accusation. (Note: Types of classical manuals of jurisprudence that listed evidence of apostasy in Islam include: ahkam al-kufr, which are legal works devoted to the rulings on those accused of unbelief; alfaz al-kufr which are a subset of legal treatise dealing with verbal expressions of unbelief (but in practice also objectionable acts).) These could be wide-ranging and seemingly far removed from basic Islamic beliefs.

The manuals Reliance of the Traveller, a 14th-century manual of the Shafi'i school of jurisprudence (fiqh), and Madjma' al-Anhur by Hanafi scholar Shaykhzadeh (d. 1667) include

From Reliance:

1. bowing before sun, moon, objects of nature, idols, cross or any images symbolically representing God whether in mere contrariness, sarcastically or with conviction;
2. intention to commit unbelief, even if one hesitates to do so;
3. speak words that imply unbelief such as "Allah is the third of three" or "I am Allah";
4. revile, question, wonder, doubt, mock or deny the existence of God or Prophet of Islam or that the Prophet was sent by God;
5. revile, deny, or mock any verse of the Quran, or the religion of Islam;
6. to deny the obligatory character of something considered obligatory by Ijma (consensus of Muslims);
7. believe that things in themselves or by their nature have cause independent of the will of God.

Selected characteristics from Madjma' al-anhur:

1. conceive of Allah as a woman or child;
2. to declare that the Angel of Death sometimes picks the wrong people;
3. to assert the createdness of the Quran, to translate the Quran;
4. to ridicule Islamic scholars or address them in a derisive manner, to reject the validity of Shariah courts;
5. to pay respect to non-Muslims, to celebrate Nowruz the Iranian New Year.

Other examples from legal treatises devoted exclusively to verbal expressions (but also actions) of disbelief (known as alfaz al-kufr) included:

- "Whoever recites the Quran to the sound of a drum is an unbeliever (yakfuru)"
- "Whoever says: 'I do not know why God mentioned this or that in the Quran' is an unbeliever (karfara)"
- "Whoever deliberately prays in a direction other than Mecca (al-qibla) is an unbeliever"
- "When someone returns from a scholarly gathering (majlis al-'il) and another one says: 'that man came back from church', that person is an unbeliever"
- "If a woman curses a scholar husband, she is an unbeliever"

Al-Ghazali held that apostasy occurs when a Muslim denies the essential dogmas: monotheism, Muhammad's prophecy, and the Last Judgment. He devoted "chapters to dealing with takfir and the reasons for which one can be accused of unbelief", in his work Fayasl al-tafriqa bayn al-Islam wa-l-zandaqa.

==== Exemptions and extenuating circumstances ====
On the other hand, there are a number of ways a Muslim may avoid being found guilty of apostasy.

Giving pause to takfir accusations is the principle of fiqh (in Shafiʿi and other madhhabs) that accusing or describing another devout Muslim of being an unbeliever is itself an act of apostasy, based on the hadith where Muhammad is reported to have said: "If a man says to his brother, 'You are an infidel', then one of them is right."

In contrast to the manuals described above, Charles Adams and A. Kevin Reinhart state that some Islamic theologians maintain that Muslims may be guilty of error and wrongdoing without descending all the way to the level of kafir. For example, a Muslim denying a point of creed may be a hypocrite (munāfiq) but not a kāfir; merely corrupt (fasād) if their disobedience was not excessive; "errant Muslim sectarians ... astray (ḍāll)"; those whose Qurʿānic interpretation (taʿwīl) are faulty are in error and not unbelievers because their "citation of Qurʿān, however mistaken, established their faith"; and "according to some", anyone who is "a person of qiblah" (prays towards the qiblah) cannot be a kāfir.

=== Before the accused can be found guilty ===
Compensating for the numerous and potentially fatal possible transgressions mentioned above that had to be avoided were the requirements ("hurdles to jump through") for finding a Muslim guilty of apostasy. While not all Islamic scholars or schools of jurisprudence agree, some Shafi'i fiqh scholars—such as Nawawi and ibn Naqib al-Misri—state that to apply the apostasy code to a Muslim, the accused must:

1. have understood and professed that "there is no God but God, Muhammad is the messenger of God" (shahada),
2. know the shariah necessarily known by all Muslims,
3. be of sound mind at the time of apostasy,
4. have reached or passed puberty, and
5. have consciously and deliberately rejected or consciously and deliberately intend to reject any part or all of Quran or of Islam (Sharia).

Maliki scholars additionally require that the person in question has publicly engaged in the obligatory practices of the religion. In contrast, Hanafi, Hanbali and Ja'fari fiqh set no such screening requirements; a Muslim's history has no bearing on when and on whom to apply the sharia code for apostasy.

Still more requirements for convicting an alleged apostate are listed by other sources, including that the crime must be explained to them, and they must be given a chance to retract it, and that the accused must have been "aware of the "unilaterally and eternally binding nature" of accepting Islam", and been aware of the punishment for apostasy (or any other hadd crime) at the time of committing the crime of apostasy (Asmi Wood).

Judgement should be left to knowledgeable Muslims (according to Islam Question and Answer) not lay Muslims.

=== Early religious schools ===
There are disputes among different early schools of religious thought as to what constitutes sufficient justification for declaring takfir:

==== Sunni Ashari ====
The orthodox Sunni position is that sins generally do not prove that someone is not a Muslim, but denials of fundamental religious principles do. Thus a murderer, for instance, may still be a Muslim, but someone who denies that murder is a sin is a kafir if he is aware that murder is considered a sin in Islam. Ash'ari argued "that it is the belief in the heart that matters the most". The founder of the Ashari school, Imam Al-Ash'ari, stated that "presumptuously declaring ... mortal sins, such as fornication or theft or the like, ... lawful and not acknowledging that it is forbidden", made the one declaring "an infidel".

==== Khawarij ====
Kharijis or Kharijites "are unanimously regarded as the arch-takfiris" in Islamic history, known for their takfir and assassination of Rashidun caliph Ali after he agreed to arbitration with his rival, Muawiyah I, to decide the succession to the Caliphate (arbitration being a means for people to make decisions, while the victor in a battle was determined by God). Kharijites believed that Muslims had the duty to revolt against any ruler who deviated from their interpretation of Islam or failed to manage Muslim's affairs with justice and consultation or committed a major sin.

==== Murjites ====
Murjites (Murjiʾah: "Those Who Postpone") believed that no one who once professed Islam could be takfired, even if they committed mortal sins. Judgment on whether those who committed serious sins were Muslims or kafir should be "postponed" (irjāʾ), and left to God alone. This theology promoted tolerance of Umayyads and converts to Islam who appeared half-hearted in their obedience. It emerged as a theological school that was opposed to the Kharijites on questions related to early controversies regarding sin and definitions of what is a true Muslim.

As opposed to the Kharijites, Murjites believed revolt against a Muslim ruler could not be justified under any circumstances, and advocated passive resistance.

==== Mu'tazilites ====
The Mu'tazilites (followed by the Zaidiyyahs) advocated what they saw as a middle way between Murjites and Khawarij, whereby who failed to sufficiently perform their obligations were demoted to sinners (fasiq), but not all the way to infidel. On the other hand, "it has been argued" (according to Alam al-Dīn) that "the general Mu'tazilite conception of īmān is the view that the acts of obedience are essential for belief and whoever neglects these acts is not a Believer".

== Takfir of Christians and Jews ==
Non-Muslims can also be takfired, according to Fayiz Salhab and Hussam S. Timani, at least. An example given is a hadith where Muhammad is quoted as saying:

May Allah's Curse be on the Jews and the Christians for they build places of worship at the graves of their prophets.

Turning the graves of prophets into places of worship is a "major kufr", and since an act of major kufr qualifies someone to be a kaffir, and since this was showing "iman outwardly" yet committed (major) kufr inwardly, they were guilty of turning their back on their religion for unbelief.

== History ==
=== Early Islam ===
Some Muslims (such as Muhammad Ibn Abd al-Wahhab, founder of Wahhabism) believe that one of the earliest examples of takfir was alleged to have been practised by the first Caliph, Abu Bakr. In response to the refusal of certain Arab tribes to pay the alms-tax (zakat), he is reported to have said: "By God, I will fight anyone who differentiates between the prayer and the zakat. ... Revelation has been discontinued, the Shari'ah has been completed: will the religion be curtailed while I am alive. ... I will fight these tribes even if they refuse to give a halter. Poor-due (zakat) is a levy on wealth and, by God, I will fight him who differentiates between the prayer and poor-due." However, Abu Bakr did not use the word kafir.

The group known as Khawarij takfired and killed the Rashidun caliph Ali (601–661 CE), after he agreed to arbitration with his rival, Muawiyah I, to decide the succession to the Caliphate. They believed that "judgement belongs to God alone", so that for human beings to arbitrate peacefully rather than wage war was making a decision rightfully belonging to God. In contrast, the victor of a battle was determined by God.

In the wars between the Umayyad Caliphate and the Khawarijs, the latter's practice of takfir became the justification for their indiscriminate attacks on civilian Muslims; the more moderate Sunni view of takfir developed partly in response to this conflict. In the Umayyad and early Abbasid periods (roughly 661–800 CE), authorities "appear" to have defended Islam against apostasy "mostly" with "intellectual debates".

During the Mihna inquisition in the Abbasid Caliphate which was instituted by the ruling Mu'tazilites, enemies of the Mu'tazila were considered heretics and disbelievers and were punished. The Mihna lasted from 833 to 851 CE.

In 922 al-Husayn ibn Mansour al-Hallaj was killed on account of blasphemy.

The celebrated Abū Ḥāmid Muḥammad ibn Muḥammad al-Ghazālī (d. 1111) preached against the excessive takfīr among theologians.

Maliki scholar Qadi Ayyad (d. 1149) is said to have been the first scholar to call for the death penalty for "disseminating improprieties about Muḥammad or questioning his authority in all questions of faith and profane life" (according to Tilman Nagel), setting the pace for later scholars like Ibn Taymiyyah and Taj al-Din al-Subki (d.1355).

In a study of 60 high-profile takfir cases in Egypt and Syria "tried before the qadis of the four Sunni schools of law" during Mamluk Sultanate (1250–1517). CE), historian Amalia Levanoni found "more than half" led to the execution of the accused. These individuals included Sufis, Rafidi, Shi'a, reverts from Islam, "alleged blasphemers and sorcerers, rebels, political rivals and others, with charges often being trumped up". Executions became more common and political during times of unrest.

=== Ibn Taymiyyah ===
14th century scholar Ibn Taymiyyah takfired a number of Muslims and Islamic groups—the Mu'tazila, Shi'a Muslims, Sufis and the Sufi mystic, Ibn Arabi, etc.—he believed to have strayed from true Islam, but he is perhaps best remembered for takfiring the Central Asian Mongols (Tartars) who had invaded the Middle East but also converted to Islam. In a fatwa he declared that Muslims should "combat ... those that place themselves outside the sharia", which the Mongols had done by continuing to follow their traditional Yasa law rather than sharia. The fatwa was important because the Mongols continued to attack after their conversion and the fatwa gave legitimacy to the Mamluk jihad against them by "rendering the Mongols apostate", not Muslims, and jihad against them obligatory. "It is obligatory to fight them until they comply to all of the Sharia, even though they may utter the Shahaadataayn" (i.e. the two declarations of faith – "There is no god except Allah and Muhammad is his Messenger").

Living in a time when Islamic jurists tended towards docility in the face of injustice, Ibn Taymiyyah urged jihad against tyrants. His fatwa created a precedent "for the declaration of takfir against a leader" (according to researcher Trevor Stanley), and his fatwa was cited by at least one insurgent (Muhammad abd-al-Salam Faraj) as justification for killing Muslim leaders who did not follow sharia.

Ibn Taymiyyah influenced/impressed Ibn Qayyim al-Jawziyya (1292–1350 AD) and Muhammad ibn Abd al-Wahhab (1703–1792 AD), and all three "quoted frequently" by the media of the contemporary Takfiri group ISIS.

=== Muhammad ibn Abd al-Wahhab ===
18th century revivalist Muhammad ibn Abd al-Wahhab cited Ibn Taymiyyah in his preaching and his followers slew many Muslims for allegedly kufr practices. Wahhab alleged that many Muslim practices that had become mainstream traditions were bid'a (innovation of the religion) and shirk (polytheism), and consequently many self-professed Muslims were actually unbelievers.

In the view of ibn Abd al-Wahhab and his followers (aka Wahhabis),

shirk took many forms: the attribution to prophets, saints, astrologers, and soothsayers of knowledge of the unseen world, which only God possesses and can grant; the attribution of power to any being except God, including the power of intercession; reverence given in any way to any created thing, even to the tomb of the Prophet; such superstitious customs as belief in omens and in auspicious and inauspicious days; and swearing by the names of the Prophet, ʿAlī, the Shīʿī imams, or the saints.

Ibn Abd al-Wahhab's interpretation of Islam (aka Wahhabism) became enormously influential throughout the Muslim world starting in the late 20th century, thanks in large part to the financial power of Saudi Arabia which spent tens of billions of dollars to propagate his movement.

19th and early 20th century

Some killings or executions of apostates from the 19th century up to 1970 listed by Rudolph Peters and Gert J. J. De Vries include the strangling of a female apostate in Egypt sometime between 1825 and 1835, an Armenian youth beheaded for reverting to Christianity in 1843 in the Ottoman Empire. Moslems in Afghanistan who converted to Ahmadiyyah condemned to be stoned in 1903 and 1925.

=== After 1950 ===
Status of Jihad (English translation). A letter from Abu Mus'ab to Abu Mohammed relating a meeting with Abu Musab Zarqawi. The author and Zaraqawi agree that the Muslims fighting in Bosnia, Tajikistan, Chechnya, and Kashmir are polytheists and supporters of secular democracy, and that the Taliban are a front for Pakistan. Zarqawi tells Abu Mus'ab that he is accused of Takfir because of his views about the Muslims in Bosnia, Tajikistan, Chechnya, and Kashmir.

According to Hussam S. Timani, both apostasy among Muslims and the number of Muslim groups "adopting the concept of takfir" have increased in recently (as of 2017). Timani states that Muslim scholars blame this on "the decline of Islamic values and the loss of solidarity among the people after centuries of colonialism and foreign domination".

Takfir has become "a central ideology of militant groups" such as those in Egypt, "which reflect the ideas" of Sayyid Qutb, Abul A'la Maududi and others, according to the Oxford Islamic Studies Online website. It is rejected by Islamic scholars and leaders such as Hasan al-Hudaybi (died 1977) and Yusuf al-Qaradawi and by mainstream Muslims and Islamist groups.

==== Sayyid Qutb and Milestones ====
In his highly influential 1964 book Milestones (Ma'alim fi al-Tariq), Sayyid Qutb embraced the principle of the fatwa of Ibn Taymiyyah that Muslims who do not follow Sharia are not really Muslims, and extended it to argue that Islam was not just in need of revival but had actually fallen back into a state of pagan ignorance known as jahiliyyah and been "extinct" for "a few centuries". While he did not specifically takfir or call for the execution of those governing non-sharia governments (he wrote Milestones in prison), he emphasized that "the organizations and authorities" of the putatively Muslim countries were irredeemably corrupt and evil and would have to be abolished by "physical power and Jihad", by a "vanguard" movement of true Muslims.

==== In Pakistan ====
Takfir has been used against the Ahmadiyya, a sect of self-described Muslims who believe the mahdi of Islam has arrived in the form of Mirza Ghulam Ahmad (died 1908), who many Muslims and Islamic scholars believe reject the doctrine of Khatam an-Nabiyyin, i.e. the belief that Muhammad was the last and final Prophet and Messenger of God, after whom there can be no other Prophet or Messenger. In 1974 Pakistan amended its constitution to declare Ahmadis as non-Muslims. In 1984, General Muhammad Zia-ul-Haq, the then military ruler of Pakistan, issued Ordinance XX, forbidding Ahmadis to call themselves Muslim. As a result, they are not allowed to profess the Islamic creed publicly or to call their places of worship mosques, to worship in non-Ahmadi mosques or public prayer-rooms, to perform the Muslim call to prayer, to use the traditional Islamic greeting in public, to publicly quote from the Quran, to preach in public, to seek converts, or to produce, publish, and disseminate their religious materials.

Local ulama (Islamic scholars) have declared takfir on another group in Pakistan, the Zikri of Makran in Balochistan. The Zikri believe that Syed Muhammad Jaunpuri (born in 1443) was the Mahdi (redeemer) of Islam. In 1978 the ulama founded a movement (Tehrik Khatm-e-Nabuat) to have the Pakistan state declare the Zikris as non-Muslims, like the Ahmadis.

==== Faraj ====
In 1981, President Anwar El Sadat was assassinated (along with six diplomats) by Islamists who had infiltrated a military parade he was reviewing. While it was assumed by many (especially in the Western world) that the killers must have been motivated by anger over Sadat's making peace with Israel, a document found by police spelled out a different motivation. Al-Farida al-gha'iba (The Neglected Duty) by Muhammad abd-al-Salam Faraj the theorist of the group (Tanzim al-Jihad movement) proclaimed that jihad would enable Muslims to rule the world and to reestablish the caliphate, but the document explained that the specific reason Sadat had to be killed was that his government (along with all Muslim majority country governments) did not rule according to sharia. Faraj cited as justification the fatwa of Ibn Taymiyyah (mentioned above) takfiring Mongols for not ruling by sharia—"combat ... those that place themselves outside the sharia"; And also verse 5:44 of the Quran: "And whoever did not judge (yahkum) by what Allah revealed, those are the unbelievers" (later copied by Osama bin Laden).

==== Salman Rushdie ====
The case of Salman Rushdie provides an example of takfir that featured prominently in Western media. Rushdie went into hiding after Ayatollah Khomeini issued a fatwa in 1989, officially declaring him a kafir who should be executed for his book The Satanic Verses, which is perceived by many Muslims to contain passages that draw into question the basis of Islam. Similar cases have occurred in Egypt: for example, Nasr Abu Zayd was accused of apostasy following his work on Islamic sources, describing the Qur'an as a historical document.

==== GIA in Algeria ====
During the Algerian Civil War of 1991–2002 the Islamist insurgent group the GIA (Armed Islamic Group of Algeria) under amir Antar Zouabri issued a manifesto in 1996 entitled The Sharp Sword, presenting Algerian society as resistant to jihad and lamented that the majority of Algerians had "forsaken religion and renounced the battle against its enemies". Zouabri at first took care to deny that the GIA had ever declared takfir on Algerian society itself. But during the month of Ramadan (January–February 1997) hundreds of civilians were killed in massacres, some with their throats cut. The massacres continued for months and culminated in August and September when hundreds of men women and children were killed in the villages of Rais, Bentalha and Beni Messous. Pregnant women were sliced open, children were hacked to pieces or dashed against walls, men's limbs were hacked off one by one, and, as the attackers retreated, they would kidnap young women to keep as sex slaves. The GIA issued a communiqué signed by Zouabri claiming responsibility for the massacres and justifying them—in contradiction to his manifesto—by declaring impious (takfir) all those Algerians who had not joined its ranks. While the GIA had been the "undisputed principal Islamist force" in Algeria two years earlier, the slaughters drained it of popular support and led to the end of "organized jihad" in Algeria. (The issue became complicated by evidence that security forces cooperated with the killers in preventing civilians from escaping, and may even have controlled the GIA.)

==== Osama bin Laden ====
Osama bin Laden takfired the government of Saudi Arabia, his home country, in his "Declaration of War" (part I, October 12, 1996), for example, declared the Saudi government apostate based on verse 5:44 of the Qur'an because in his view the Saudi "don't apply the Shari'a"

==== Tunisia ====
The constitution of Tunisia (passed after the Tunisian Revolution of 2011) criminalized takfir by placing a ban on fatwas that promote takfir.

==== Islamic State ====
The Islamic State has been heavily criticized for applying takfir to Muslims who oppose its rule. According to journalist Graeme Wood in mid-2015,

Following takfiri doctrine, the Islamic State is committed to purifying the world by killing vast numbers of people. The lack of objective reporting from its territory makes the true extent of the slaughter unknowable, but social-media posts from the region suggest that individual executions happen more or less continually, and mass executions every few weeks.

The tendency of the group to target Shia Muslims with suicide bombings is due to the fact that the group considers them apostates.

==== Salafi jihadis ====
Shiraz Maher specifies that the major Salafi jihadist theorists like Abu Hamza al-Masri, Abu Muhammad al-Maqdisi, Omar Abdel-Rahman, and Abu Basir al-Tartusi ask to exercise caution while doing takfir, as declaring a Muslim unbeliever wrongly makes the one who accuses to himself get out of the religion of Islam and become an apostate himself.

== See also ==
- Al-Baqara 256 "there is no compulsion in religion"
- Anathema
- Kafir
- Persecution of minority Muslim groups
- Sectarian violence among Muslims
- Takfiri
- Heresy
- Zandaqa
- Takfir wal-Hijra
