= Roxanne Leslie Euben =

American political scientist

Roxanne Leslie Euben is an American political scientist specializing in Islamic political thought. She is Walter H. and Leonore C. Annenberg Professor in the Social Sciences, at the University of Pennsylvania.

== Education and career ==
She graduated from Princeton University in 1995 with a PhD in Politics and Near Eastern Studies. Prior to earning her position at the University of Pennsylvania, she taught at Wellesley College. She was a John Simon Guggenheim Memorial Foundation fellow in 2016–2017.

== Works ==
- Enemy in the Mirror: Islamic Fundamentalism and the Limits of Modern Rationalism (Princeton, 1999),
- Journeys to the Other Shore: Muslim and Western Travelers in Search of Knowledge, (Princeton, 2006),
- with Muhammad Qasim Zaman, Princeton Readings in Islamist Thought: Texts and Contexts from Al-Banna to Bin Laden (Princeton, 2009)
- Driven To Their Knees: Humiliation in Contemporary Politics (Princeton, 2025)
- Euben, Roxanne Leslie (2001). "The New Manichaeans". Theory and Event. 5 (4). doi:10.1353/tae.2001.0034. S2CID 144072929.
