= Zeinabou =

Zeinabou is a given name. Notable people with the name include:

- Zeinabou Mindaoudou Souley (born 1964), Nigerien physicist
- Zeinabou Taghi, Mauritanian politician
