= Taqi =

Taqi (Persian: تقی, romanized: Taqī) is a male Arabic given name and surname. It may refer to:

== Given name ==
- Taqi al-Din (disambiguation)
- Taqi Arani (1903–1940), Iranian political activist
- Taqi Baharna (born 1930), Bahraini poet and diplomat
- Taqi Modarresi (1932–1997), Iranian writer and child psychiatrist
- Taqi Mubarak (born 1978), Omani footballer
- Taqi Muhammad (813/814–839/840), ninth Ismāʿīlī Imam
- Taqi Tabatabaei Qomi (1923–2016), Iranian Twelver Shi'a Marja

== Surname ==
- Mohammad Taqi (disambiguation)
- Muhammad al-Taqi (811–835), ninth Shi'a Imam
- Ridha Jawad Taqi, Iraqi politician

== See also ==
- Taghi, a list of people with the given name or surname
- Taghiyev, a slavicised surname driven from Taqi
- TaqI, bacterial enzyme
