= Khaled al-Bassam =

Bahraini historian and writer (1956–2015)

- خالد البسام
- Born: November 18, 1956; Unaizah, Saudi Arabia
- Died: 2015 (aged 59); Bahrain
- Occupation(s): writer, historian
- Known for: ثمن الملح ("The Price of Salt"), a novel

Khaled al-Bassam (Arabic: خالد البسام, Unaizah, Saudi Arabia, November 18, 1956 – 2015) was a Bahraini writer and historian. He has published many books on the history of Bahrain and the Persian Gulf region, including novels and biographies of artists and politicians.

== Education ==
He studied English at Oxford University in the United Kingdom, then French immersion in Vichy, France.

== Career ==
From 1984 to 1986, he served as Editor-in-Chief of the magazine, Gulf Panorama, followed by a brief stint in 1988 for Al-Hayat in London. From 1988 to 2000, he served as Deputy Editor-in-Chief of Al Ayam back home, owned by the same company as Gulf Panorama. From 2001 to 2005, he was Editor-in-Chief of the magazine, Hana Bahrain.

== Publications ==
Publications
Title	Year
تلك الأيام (“Those Days”)	1986
رجال في جزائر اللؤلؤ (“Pearl Divers of Algeria”)	1991
خليج الحكايات (“Bay of Stories”)	1993
مرفأ الذكريات: رحلات إلى الكويت القديمة (“The Harbor of Memories: Travels to Ancient Kuwait”)	1995
صدمة الاحتكاك: حكايات الإرسالية الأمريكية في الخليج والجزيرة العربية 1892 - 1925 (“Friction Shock: Stories of the American Mission in the Gulf and Arabia, 1892—1925”)	1998, published by Dar al Saqi
القوافل: رحلات الإرسالية الأمريكية في مدن الخليج والجزيرة العربية 1901-1926م (“Caravans: American Missionaries’ Journeys in the Cities of the Gulf and the Arabian Peninsula, 1901—1926”)	2000
بريد القلب (“Heart Mail”)	2000
بساتين (“Orchards”)	2000
عزف على السطور (“Play the Lines”)	2000
شخصيات بحرينية (“Bahraini Luminaries”)	2000
حكايات من البحرين (“Tales from Bahrain”)	2001
نسوان زمان (“Women of History”)	2002
يا زمان الخليج (“O Gulf History”)	2002
ثرثرة فوق دجلة: حكايات التبشير المسيحي في العراق 1900 - 1935م (“Gossip over the Tigris: Stories of Christian Evangelization in Iraq, 1900—1935”)	2004
كلنا فداك: البحرين والقضية الفلسطينية 1917 – 1948 (“We Are All Fadak: Bahrain and the Palestinian Question, 1917—1948”)	2005
يوميات المنفى: عبد العزيز الشملان في سانت هيلانه 1956-1961 (“Diary of Exile: Abdulaziz al-Shamlan in Saint Helena, 1956—1961”)	2007
عبد الله الزائد الشموع تضيء (“Abdullah Lights the Excess Candles”)	2007
لا يوجد مصور في بريدة (“There Is No Photographer in Buraidah,” novel)	2008
مدرس ظفار (“The Teacher of Dhofar,” novel)	2010
البحرين تروي (“Trojan Bahrain”)	2011
تقي البحارنة: عنفوان الكتابة (“Taqi Baharna: The Influence of His Writing”)	2012
جراندول (“Grandwell,” novel)	2016
ثمن الملح (“The Price of Salt,” novel)	2016, published by Dar Al Jadawel
