= Taghi =

Taghi is a masculine given name and surname. It may refer to:

== Given name ==
- Taghi Akbari (born 1945), Iranian former tennis player
- Taghi Amirani, Iranian-born English physicist and documentary filmmaker
- Taghi Khamoushi (1937–2006), Iranian politician and merchant
- Taghi Rahmani (born 1959), Iranian journalist, writer and nationalist-religious activist
- Taghi Rezaei (born 1991), Iranian bodybuilder
- Taghi Riahi (1911–1989), Iranian brigadier general and Chief of Staff of the Iranian Imperial Army
- Taghi Rouhani (1920–2013), Iranian radio news anchor
- Taghi Shahbazi Simurg (1892–1938), Azerbaijani politician, doctor, writer and revolutionary
- Taghi Taghiyev (1917–1993), Azeri painter

== Surname ==
- Amir Taghi (born 1996), American fashion designer
- Ridouan Taghi (born 1977), Moroccan-Dutch criminal
- Zeinabou Taghi, Mauritanian politician

== See also ==
- Taqi
