= Taghiyev =

Taghiyev or also Tagiyev (Azerbaijani: Tağıyev, Russian: Тагиев, German: Tagiew) is a surname common among Azeris. Its feminine form is Taghiyeva or also Tagiyeva. It is a slavicised version of Taqi with addition of the suffix -yev.

People with the surname:

- Alakbar Taghiyev, an Azerbaijani composer and author of popular Azerbaijani songs.
- Anaxanım Etibar qızı Tağıyeva, an Azerbaijani singer
- Javid Taghiyev, several people
- Mahmud Taghiyev, an Azerbaijani painter
- Rafig Taghiyev, an Azerbaijani short story writer
- Taghi Taghiyev, an Azerbaijani painter
- Zeynalabdin Taghiyev, an Azerbaijani national industrial magnate and philanthropist
