= Shia Islamism =

Political Islam in the Twelver Shi'a branch of Islam

The emblem of Iran, a symbol of Shia Islamism

Shia Islamism is the implementation of Shia Islam in politics and opposition to Sunni Islamism. Most study and reporting on Islamism has been focused on Sunni Islamist movements. (Note: "The study of Islamist movements has often implicitly meant the study of Sunni Islamist movements. ... the majority of studies [of Islamism] concern various forms of Sunni Islamism, whereas the "Other Islamists"—different kinds of Shia Islamist groups—have received far less attention ...") Initially a very small ideology, it gained popularity after the Iranian Revolution (1978–1979) led by Ruhollah Khomeini, whose Shia Islamist policies became known as Khomeinism. Khomeini's form of Islamism was unique not only for being a powerful political movement which successfully came to power, but for having completely swept away the old regime, created a new one with a new constitution, new institutions and a new concept of governance (the velayat-e-faqih). A historical event, it changed militant Islam from a topic of limited impact and interest, to one that few inside or outside the Muslim world were unaware. However, there are also Shia Islamist movements outside of Khomeinism, such as the Islamic Dawa Party of Muhammad Baqir al-Sadr and the Sadrist Movement of Muqtada al-Sadr.

Though a minority of the world Muslim community, Twelver Shias form the majority of the population in the countries of Iran, Iraq, and Azerbaijan, and substantial minorities in Afghanistan, Bahrain, India, Lebanon, Kuwait, Pakistan, Qatar, Syria, Saudi Arabia and the United Arab Emirates.

Islamism in general has been defined as a religious revivalist movement for a return to the original texts and the inspiration of the original believers of Islam, but one which requires Islam to be a "political system".

== Islamism—definitions, variations ==
While precise descriptions and definitions of Islamism vary, they include the following:

- a combination of two pre-existing trends
  - religious revivalism, which appears periodically in Islam to revive the faith, weakened also periodically by "foreign influence, political opportunism, moral laxity, and the forgetting of sacred texts" (it is said that every century a great figure will arrive, known as a mujaddid to renew the faith),
  - the more recent movement against imperialism/colonialism in the Third World embraced by leftists and nationalists (Third-Worldism), that in the Muslim world morphed into a more simple anti-Westernism focused on Islam rather than socialism, (this movement was much stronger in Iran than in Sunni countries).
- "the belief that Islam should guide social and political as well as personal life",
- an Islamic form of "religionized politics" or religious fundamentalism,
- "the ideology that guides society as a whole and that [teaches] law must be in conformity with the Islamic sharia".

Ideologies dubbed Islamist may advocate a "revolutionary" strategy of Islamizing society through exercise of state power, or alternately a "reformist" strategy to re-Islamizing society through grassroots social and political activism. Islamists may emphasize the implementation of sharia, pan-Islamic political unity, the creation of Islamic states, and/or the outright removal of non-Muslim influences—particularly of Western or universal economic, military, political, social, or cultural nature—in the Muslim world. In the 21st century, some analysts such as Graham E. Fuller describe it as a form of identity politics, involving "support for (Muslim) identity, authenticity, broader regionalism, revivalism, (and) revitalization of the community."

=== Islamism and Khomeini ===
Khomeini's form of Islamism was unique not only for being a powerful political movement which successfully came to power, but for having completely swept away the old regime, created a new one with a new constitution, new institutions and a new concept of governance (the velayat-e-faqih). A historical event, it changed militant Islam from a topic of limited impact and interest, to one that few inside or outside the Muslim world were unaware.

Describing the Islamic system of Khomeini, the Islamic Revolution or the Islamic Republic and how it differed from traditional non-Islamist Shi'ism, is complicated by the fact that it evolved through several stages, especially before and after taking power.

=== Traditional and Islamist Shi'ism ===
Historian Ervand Abrahamian argues that Khomeini's Islamist movement not only created a new form of Shiism, but converted traditional Shi'ism "from a conservative quietist faith" into "a militant political ideology that challenged both the imperial powers and the country's upper class". Khomeini himself followed traditional Shi'i Islamic attitudes in his writings during the 1940, 50s and 60s, only changing during the late 1960s.

Some major tenants of Twelver Shīʿa Muslim belief are

- the sorrowful tragedy of the martyrdom of Imam Hussien; how he refused to bow to worldliness and power of the tyrant Mu'awiya I whose malicious servants outnumbered and killed Hussien at Karbala; how his virtue and his suffering in martyrdom inspires and unites Shia community (Ummah).
- the return of the Mahdi (the Twelfth Imam, Hujjat Allah al-Mahdi); the last of the Imams who never died but has lived for over 1000 years somewhere on Earth in "Occultation"; who prophesies tell us will return some time before Judgement Day to vanquish tyranny and rule Earth in justice and peace.
- ritual purity; this prohibits physical contact with impure substances such as dogs, pigs, excrement, nonbelievers; and prohibits impurities from entering "mosques, and shrines, and the like". (Note: "There are eleven things which are impure: urine, excrement, sperm, bones, blood, dogs, pigs, non-Moslem men and women, wine, beer, and the sweat of the excrement-eating camel." "Every part of the body of a non-Moslem individual is impure, even the hair on his hand and his body hair, his nails, and all the secretions of his body."))

=== Pre-Islamist, traditional Shi'ism ===
Traditionally, the term Shahid in Shi'ism referred to "the famous Shi'i saints who in obeying God's will, had gone to their deaths", such as the "Five Martyrs". Prior to the 1970s, this was also the way Khomeini used the term—and not rank and file fighters who "had died for the cause".

Rituals such as the Day of Ashura, lamentation of the death of Hussein, visiting shrines like the Imam Reza shrine in Mashad, were important part of popular Shia piety. Iranian shahs and the Awadh's nawabs often presided over any Ashura observances.

Prior to the spread of Khomeini's book Islamic Government after 1970, it was agreed that only the rule of an Imam, i.e. the Twelfth Imam for the contemporary world), was legitimate or "fully legitimate". While waiting for his return and rule, Shia jurists have tended to stick to one of three approaches to the state, according to at least two historians (Moojan Momen, Ervand Abrahamian): cooperated with it, trying to influence policies by becoming active in politics, or most commonly, remaining aloof from it. (Note: Abrahamian offers three slightly different options: shunning the authorities as usurpers, accepting them grudgingly, accepting them wholeheartedly—especially if the state was Shi'i.)

For many centuries prior to the spread of Khomeini's book, "no Shii writer ever explicitly contended that monarchies per se were illegitimate or that the senior clergy had the authority to control the state." Clergy

were to study the law based on the Quran, the Prophet's traditions, and the teachings of the Twelve Imams. They were also to use reason to update these laws; issue pronouncements on new problems; adjudicate in legal disputes; and distribute the khoms contributions to worthy widows, orphans, seminary students, and indigent male descendants of the Prophet."

Even the revivalist Shi'i cleric Sheikh Fazlollah Nouri—celebrated in the Islamic Republic for defending Islam and sharia against democracy, and martyred by "agents" of foreign powers because of it—argued against democracy not because it was clerics that Iranians should obey, but because they should obey their monarch and not limit his power with a constitution and parliament. Prior to 1970 Khomeini

"emphasized that no cleric had ever claimed the right to rule; that many, including Majlisi, had supported their rulers, participated in government, and encouraged the faithful to pay taxes and cooperate with state authorities. If on rare occasions they had criticized their rulers, it was because they opposed specific monarchs, not the 'whole foundation of monarchy.' He also reminded his readers that Imam Ali had accepted 'even the worst of the early caliphs'".

In his first political tract, Kashf al-Asrar (1943), written before his embrace of political Islam, Khomeini denounced the first Pahlavi shah, Reza Shah (the father of the shah he overthrew), for many offenses against traditional Islam—"closing down seminaries, expropriating religious endowments (Waqf), propagating anticlerical sentiments, replacing religious courts with state ones", permitting consumption of alcoholic beverages and the playing of 'sensuous music', forcing men to wear Western style hats, establishing coeducational schools, and banning women's chador hijab, "thereby 'forcing women to go naked into the streets'"; but "explicitly disavowed" advocating the overthrow of the shah and "repeatedly reaffirmed his allegiance to monarchies in general and to 'good monarchs' in particular, for 'bad order was better than no order at all.'"

As "the most vocal antiregime cleric", Khomeini did not call for the overthrow of the shah even after he was deported from Iran by him.

Khomeini also accepted the traditional Shi'i view of society described in Imam Ali's Nahj al-Balagha. Hierarchy in society was natural, "the poor should accept their lot and not envy the rich; and the rich should thank God, avoid conspicuous consumption, and give generously to the poor."

The "Golden Age of Islam" to be looked back on "longingly" according to tradition, was the Mecca of Muhammad (a prophet) and the caliphate of Imam Ali (an Imam). Disorder in society (such as overthrowing monarchs) was wrong because (as Khomeini put it) "bad order was better than no order at all". The term mostazafin (oppressed), was used in the "Quranic sense" of "'humble' and passive 'meek' believers, especially orphans, widows, and the mentally impaired." Khomeini rarely spoke of them in his pre-1970 writings.

=== Post 1970 Khomeini ===
In late 1969, Khomeini's view of society and politics changed dramatically. What prompted this change is unclear as he did not footnote his work or admit to drawing ideas from others, or for that matter even admit he had changed his views. In his 1970 lectures, Khomeini claimed Muslims "have the sacred duty to oppose all monarchies. ... that monarchy was a 'pagan' institution that the 'despotic' Umayyads had adopted from the Roman and Sassanid empires". Khomeini saw Islam as a political system that until the return of the Twelfth Imam, presides over an Islamist state or works for its creation.

Following "in the footsteps" of Ali Shariati, the Tudeh Party, Mojahedin, Hojjat al-Islam Nimatollah Salahi-Najafabadi, by the 1970s Khomeini began to embrace the idea that martyrdom was "not a saintly act, but a revolutionary sacrifice to overthrow a despotic political order".

Some other differences between traditional Shi'i doctrine and that of Ruhollah Khomeini and his followers was on how to wait for the return the reemergence of the hidden Imam, Muhammad al-Mahdi. Traditionally the approach was to wait patiently, as he would not return until "the world was overflowing with injustice and tyranny". Turning this belief inside out, Khomeini preached that it would not be injustice and suffering that would hasten his return, but the just rule of the Islamic State, this justice "surpassing" the "Golden Age" of Muhammad and Imam Ali's rule.

Khomeini showed little interest in the rituals of Shia Islam such as the Day of Ashura, never presided over any Ashura observances, nor visited the enormously popular Imam Reza shrine. Foreign Shia hosts in Pakistan and elsewhere were often surprised by the disdain shown for Shia shrines by officials visiting from the Islamic Republic. At least one observer has explained it as a product of the belief of Khomeini and his followers that Islam was first and foremost about Islamic law, and that the revolution itself was of "equal significance" to Battle of Karbala where the Imam Husayn was martyred. (For example, in May 2005, President Mahmoud Ahmadinejad's stated that "the Iranian revolution was of the same `essence` as Imam Husayn's movement.")

==== Evolution ====
Khomeini's evolution was not just from traditionalist to revolutionary. There were several stages.

- In his famed January–February 1970 lectures to students in Najaf, Khomeini spelled out a system of "Islamic Government" whereby the leading Islamic jurist would enforce sharia law—law which "has absolute authority over all individuals and the Islamic government". The jurist would not be elected, and no legislature would be needed since divine law called for rule by jurist and "there is not a single topic in human life for which Islam has not provided instruction and established a norm". Without this system, injustice, corruption, waste, exploitation and sin would reign, and Islam would decay. This plan was disclosed to his students and the religious community but not widely publicized. (Note: "In offering an alternative, Khomeini did not publicly refer to his work on Islamic government; on the contrary, his entourage later disclaimed this work, arguing that it was either a SAVAK forgery or the rough notes of an student listener.")
- Throughout the rest of the 1970s, as he gained ground to become the leader of the revolution, Khomeini made no mention of his theory of Islamic government, little or no mention of any details of religious doctrinal or specific public policies. (Note: Khomeini did not "commit himself to precise proposals and specific plans; as one journalist later observed, `imprecision was a way of life` for the entourage.) He did reassure the public his government would "be democratic as well as Islamic" and that "neither he nor his clerical supporters harbored any secret desire to 'rule' the country", but mainly and stuck to attacking the Iranian monarch (shah) "on a host of highly sensitive socioeconomic issues". He

accused him of widening the gap between rich and poor; favoring cronies, relatives ... wasting oil resources on the ever expanding army and bureaucracy ... condemning the working class to a life of poverty, misery, and drudgery ... neglecting low-income housing", dependency on the west, supporting the US and Israel, undermining Islam and Iran with "cultural imperialism",

often sounding not just populist but leftist ("Oppressed of the world, unite", "The problems of the East come from the West—especially from American imperialism"), including an emphasis on class struggle. In his telling, the classes locked in struggle were just two: the oppressed (mostazafin) that he supported, and the oppressors (mostakberin) made up of the shah's government, the wealthy and well-connected, who would be deposed come the revolution.
With this message discipline, Khomeini united a broad coalition movement (moderates, secular liberals and leftists) that hated the shah but had little else in common with Khomeini and his core followers.

- Having overthrow the shah in 1979,
  - Khomeini and his core group commenced establishing Islamic government of a ruling Jurist (Khomeini being the jurist) and purging unwanted allies: liberals, moderate Muslims (the Provisional Government), then leftist Shi'a (like president Abolhassan Banisadr and the MeK guerillas). Eventually, "one faction", one "social group" was left—"bazaar merchants and business operators linked to the political–religious hierarchy"—and they benefited financially from the revolution.
  - By 1982, having consolidated power, Khomeini also "toned down" his populist language, "watered down" his class rhetoric," took time to praise the bazaars and their merchants, no longer celebrating the righteous, angry poor. (The term mostazafin no longerreferred to a social class but became political term, covering all those who supported the Islamic Republic.)
  - He especially emphasized how (according to him) essential Shi'i clerics were to protecting Islam and Iran; how they had kept alive "National Consciousness" and stood as a "fortress of independence" against imperialism and royal despotism in the Tobacco protest of 1891, the Persian Constitutional Revolution of 1906, during Reza Shah's reign, rising up against his son Muhammad Reza Shah in 1963.
- In late 1987 and early 1988, Khomeini startled many by declaring that the Islamic Republic had "absolute authority" over everything, including "secondary ordinances", i.e. sharia law such as the Five Pillars of Islam.

"I should state that the government, which is part of the absolute deputyship of the Prophet, is one of the primary injunctions of Islam and has priority over all other secondary injunctions, even prayers, fasting and hajj."

The announcement was attributed to having to deal with a deadlock between populists and conservatives in his government, where Khomeini was attempting to nudge conservatives in the guardian council to not veto an income tax and a "watered-down" labor law (which the council had hitherto opposed as unIslamic).

- In the post-Khomeini 1990s, the line of the Islamic Republic—as found in forced confessions of political opponents, children's history textbooks, and other sources—emphasized not velayat-e faqih and scriptural justification of rule by the clergy, but the importance and virtue of the Shi'i clergy; that throughout the century before the revolution it was the clergy that had preserved national independence and "valiantly" protected Iran from "imperialism, feudalism and despotism", while the left (the other declared enemy of imperialism) had "betrayed" the nation.

=== Shia Islamism outside Iran ===
Vali Nasr notes the success of Hezbollah suicide attacks as part of the "cult of martyrdom" that had started with suicidal human wave attacks by the Islamic Republic of Iran against Iraq in the Iran–Iraq War. Hezbollah's "martyrdom operations" killed approximately 600 Israeli soldiers in Southern Lebanon between 1982 and 1984, a relatively large number for Israel, a small country, and which "did much to help force Israel out" of Lebanon. This "rare victory" over Israel "lionized" the group among Arabs in the region and added to "the aura of Shia power still glimmering amid the afterglow of the Iranian revolution." Hezbollah suicide attacks also drove Western peacekeepers out of Lebanon, killing 243 U.S. Marines and 58 French troops; blew up the American embassy in 1983, killing the Middle East experts in the CIA, and then several months later blew up the annex the survivors of the US embassy had retreated to. Hamas used suicide attacks as a model for in its fight in the Palestinian Territories.

Not as successful was Tehran's post-revolutionary "money and organizational help" in other countries, first to create Shia militias and revolutionary groups to spread Islamic revolution, and following that to encourage "armed conflicts, street protests and rebellion, and acts of terrorism" against secular and pro-American regimes such as Egypt and Pakistan.

== Sunni and Shi'i Islamism ==
Prior to the 1979 Islamist Revolution in Iran, "the general consensus" among religious historians was that "Sunni Islam(ism) was more activist, political, and revolutionary than the allegedly quietist and apolitical Shia Islam", who shunned politics while waiting for the 12th Imam to reappear. After the Iranian revolution there was a reversal, and with a new consensus that Shia Islam was a "religion of protest", looking to the Battle of Karbala as an example of "standing up against injustice even if it required martyrdom".

=== Similarities, influence, cooperation ===
Arguably the first prominent Islamist, Rashid Rida, published a series of articles in Al-Manar titled "The Caliphate or the Supreme Imamate" during 1922–1923. In this highly influential treatise, Rida advocated for the restoration of the Caliphate ruled by Muslim jurists and proposed Islamic Salafiyya movement revival measures across the globe to reform education and purify Islam. Ayatullah Khomeini's manifesto Islamic Government, Guardianship of the jurist, was greatly influenced by Rida's book (Persian: اسلام ناب) and by his analysis of the post-colonial Muslim world.

Before the Islamic Revolution, Ali Khamenei, the man who served as Supreme Leader of Iran from 1989 to 2026, was an early champion and translator of the works of the Brotherhood jihadist theorist, Sayyid Qutb. Other Sunni Islamists/revivalists who were translated into Persian include Sayyid's brother, Muhammad Qutb, and South Asian Islamic revivalist writer Abul A'la Maududi along with other Pakistani and Indian Islamists. "These books became the main source of nourishment for Iranian militant clerics’ sermons and writings during the pre-revolution era."

==== Khomeini and Qutb ====
Some ideas shared by both Qutb in his manifesto (Milestones) and Khomeini in his (Islamic Government), are an extremely high regard for the powers of Sharia law, and a belief that Non-Muslims are involved in an aggressive, unprovoked undermining of Islam and Muslims (sometimes called the "War on Islam").

Qutb preached that the West has a centuries-long "enmity toward Islam" and a "well-thought-out scheme ... to demolish the structure of Muslim society", but at the same time knows its "civilization is unable to present any healthy values for the guidance of mankind"; Khomeini preached that Western unbelievers want "to keep us backward, to keep us in our present miserable state so they can exploit our riches ..."

Qutb considered Sharia a branch of "that universal law which governs the entire universe ... as accurate and true as any of the laws known as the `laws of nature`", physics, biology, etc. Better than that, applying Sharia law would bring "harmony between human life and the universe", with results approaching those otherwise "postponed for the next life", i.e. heaven. Khomeini doesn't compare Sharia to heaven but does say

"God, Exalted and Almighty, by means of the Most Noble Messenger (peace and blessing be upon him), sent laws that astound us with their magnitude. He instituted laws and practices for all human affairs ... There is not a single topic in human life for which Islam has not provided instruction and established a norm."

The explanation for why these laws have not been in effect in recent Muslim history is that "in order to make the Muslims, especially the intellectuals and the younger generation, deviate from the path of Islam, foreign agents have constantly insinuated that Islam has nothing to offer, that Islam consists of a few ordinances concerning menstruation and parturition ..."

==== Other similarities ====
Observers (such as Morten Valbjørn) have noted the similarities between Sunni and Shia Islamist movements, such as the Sunni Hamas and Shia Hezbollah "Islamist national resistance" groups, and how Ruhollah Khomeini was "a voice of Pan-Islamism rather than of a distinct kind of Shia-Islamism" during his time in power.

=== Differences and clashes ===
==== Clashes ====
Vali Nasr argues that as the Muslim world decolonialised, Arab nationalism waned and Islam underwent a religious revival. As religion became important, so did differences in Islamic doctrine, not least between Sunnism and Shi'ism. Conflicts between the two movements, spelled out in the teachings of scholars such as Ibn Taymiyyah, intensified. Whatever early cooperation there had been between Sunni and Shi'i Islamism ended, as did an era of tolerance in general between the Sunni and Shi'i schools. (Note: Nasr argues there was an era of tolerance between Sunni and Shia earlier in the 20th century from the end of the Ottoman Empire until the Iranian Revolution.)

Where Iranians saw their revolution as righting of injustice, Sunnis saw mostly "Shia mischief" and a challenge to Sunni political and cultural dominance. There was a coup attempt in Bahrain in 1981, terrorist plots in Kuwait in 1983 and 1984. "What followed was a Sunni-versus-Shia contest for dominance, and it grew intense."

In part this was an issue of Sunni revivalism/fundamentalism being "rooted in conservative religious impulses and the bazaars, mixing mercantile interests with religious values", while Shia—"the longtime outsiders"—were "more drawn to radical dreaming and scheming", such as revolution. Saudi Arabia served as a leader of Sunni fundamentalism, but Khomeini saw monarchy as unislamic and the House of Saud as "unpopular and corrupt"—dependent on American protection, and ripe for overthrow, just as the shah had been. Saudi's took this threat seriously because its oil fields lay in the eastern part of its large land mass, where the Shia lived and who traditionally made up the workforce there. Iran was close by, across the Persian Gulf. In 1979–80 the area was the scene of "riots and disturbances". But conservative Sunni fundamentalists were not only closer to the Sunni Saudis theologically, they were very often beneficiaries of Saudi funding of "petro-Islam", and didn't hesitate to take Saudis side against Khomeini.

An incident that closed the door on any alliance between Khomeini's Islamic Republic and the Islamist Muslim Brotherhood was Khomeini's refusal to support the Brotherhood when it rose up against the Baathist Arab Nationalist regime in Hama, Syria a few years after the revolution. As secular and nationalists, the Baathists were in theory ideological enemies, while the Muslim Brotherhood were putatively comrade Islamists, but the Brotherhood were Sunni and the Syrian rulers a (not-very-close) relative of Twelver Shi'i (Alawites), and Iran's ally against Saddam Hussein's Iraq. This was seen as a test where Khomeini had chosen "a nominal Shia ally" in the form of such as Bashar al-Assad, over the Islamist Brotherhood.

With the Iran–Iraq War (1980–1988), Sunni–Shia strife saw a major upturn, particularly in Iraq and Pakistan, leading to thousands of deaths. Among the explanations for the increase are conspiracies by outside forces to divide Muslims, the recent Islamic revival and increased religious purity and consequent takfir, upheaval, destruction and loss of power of Sunni caused by the US invasion of Iraq, and sectarianism generated by Arab regimes defending themselves against the mass uprisings of the Arab Spring (2010–2012).

==== Differences ====
- The Iranian revolution drew on the "millenarian expectations" of Shi'ism found in the "semi-divine" status accorded to "Imam" (no longer Ayatollah) Khomeini, and the rumours spread by his network that his face could be seen in the moon.
- Shia look to Ali ibn Abī Tālib and Husayn ibn Ali Imam as models and providers of hadith, but not Caliphs Abu Bakr, Omar or Uthman.
- Khomeini talked not about restoring the Caliphate or Sunni Islamic democracy, but about establishing a state where the guardianship of the political system was performed by Shia jurists (ulama) as the successors of Shia Imams until the Mahdi returns from occultation. His concept of velayat-e-faqih ("guardianship of the [Islamic] jurist"), held that the leading Shia Muslim cleric in society—which Khomeini's mass of followers believed and chose to be himself—should serve as the supervisor of the state in order to protect or "guard" Islam and Sharia law from "innovation" and "anti-Islamic laws" passed by dictators or democratic parliaments.
- Nikki Keddie argues that at least in Iran, (where its been the state religion since 1501), "Shi'i Islam appears to have been even more resistant to foreign influences than Sunni Islam". In Iran there has been a "revulsion to foreign influence" and a "long-held belief that Western nonbelievers were out to undermine Iran and Islam", that intertwined "economic, political, and religious resentments". The Tobacco protest of 1890–92 "shared with later revolutionary and rebellious movements in Iran "a substantial anti-imperialist and antiforeign component".

Olivier Roy notes that unlike Sunni Islam, where clergy were largely if not entirely opponents of Islamism, in Shi'ism, clergy were often the leaders—not only Ruhollah Khomeini, but Muhammad Baqir al-Sadr and Mahmoud Taleghani. Roy also posits several features of Shi'i Islam that made it amendable to Khomeini's theory of Islamist theocracy, specifically his theory of a ruling Islamic jurist being necessary for the preservation of Islam, a theory embraced only by Shia Islamists (followers of Khomeini), not by any Sunni.

Financial and geographic independence (Najaf and Karbala were outside the borders of the Iranian Empire); the right to interpretation, even to innovation on all questions; delegitimization of the state ... ; strong hierarchy and structure; all operated to make the clergy a political force.

- The victory of the Usuli school of thought in Shia Islam over the Akhbaris, meant most clerics were now Usuli and high Usuli clerics assumed the right of ijtihad or interpretation.
- Shi'i seminaries often had students from other countries, and these seminary cities could serve as a refuge when a cleric felt political pressure at home. (Khomeini operated his anti-shah network in Iran out of Najaf Iraq.)
- Openness by the Shi'i clergy to non-Islamic writings and thought not found in Sunni Islam, "combining clear philosophical syncretism with an exacting casuistic legalism." (see also Islamic socialism, making a hybrid of Islam and Marxism, or making cooperation with them or Marxists possible.) "The distinction between mullahs and intellectuals was not as sharp in Iran as in the Sunni world."
- The practice of every Shi'i Muslim following a marja' or high cleric and paying them zakat/tithe directly meant that "since the eighteenth century... the Shiite clergy have played a social and educational role with no parallel among Sunni clergy", and have had autonomy from the state unlike Sunni ulama.
- if it was felt (as Khomeini did) that the state should be a theocracy, the question of who should be the head theocrat had a ready answer in Shi'i Islam—the top ranked cleric—since Shi'i clergy had an internal hierarchy based on the level of the learning not found among Sunni clergy.
- The importance of the state in Shia Iran is reflected in the legislated criminal code which includes traditional sharia punishments—"qisas, retaliation; diyat, bloodletting; hudud, capital punishment for an offense against God—but it is to this code and not "directly to the sharia" that Judges in the Islamic Republic must refer.

At least Khomeini's Islamist movement during its early years, "third world solidarity took precedence over Muslim fraternity in an utter departure from all other Islamic movements". The Sandinistas, African National Congress, and Irish Republican Army, were promoted over neighboring Sunni Muslims in Afghanistan, who though fighting invading atheist Russians, were politically conservative.

Olivier Roy speculates on what led Shiite minorities outside of Iran to "identify with the Islamic Revolution" and be subject to "Iranization". He includes the fact that when modernization and economic change compelled them to leave their Shi'i "ghettos" they embraced pan-Shiism (Shiite Universalism) rather than nationalism; that Iranian students for many years were banished from Iraqi and so studied in Qum not Najaf where Iranian influence intensified; that so many Shiite students were Iranian that as clergy they ended up serving many non-Iranian Shi'a and exposed them to Iranian ways.

According to one analysis (by the International Crisis Group in 2005) an explanation for the more cohesive, more clergy-led character of Shia Islamism can be traced to Shi'i Islam's "historical status as the minority form of Islam. This gave its ulama "historical autonomy vis-à-vis the state", which allowed it to escape cooptation by Sunni rulers and thus "able to engage with contemporary problems and stay relevant", through the practice of ijtihad in divine law. Some exceptions to this pattern are found in Iraq, where Shi'i Islamist paramilitary groups are fragmented, and the Shi'i Islamist group Islamic Dawa Party (Hizb al-Dawa) is known not only for its inspiration from the Sunni Muslim Brotherhood but also for the "strong presence of laymen rather than clerics".

Other differences include the fact that Shia have had over 40 years of experience of actual rule by an Islamist state—the Islamic Republic of Iran ... "Sunni Islamist movements have regularly participated in elections, but rarely with the opportunity to actually win (except at the local level)." ( The one year exception of the Muslim Brotherhood in Egypt having little or no possibly of repeating itself.) While Shi'i "Islamist parties in Iraq, Lebanon and Iran ... do have meaningful prospects of victory."

Shi'i Islamists often saw no contradiction between "extolling Shiism and pan-Islamic solidarity." Shi'a were not to be privileged or supreme, but were held "in the way Marx thought of the proletariat: a particular group that brings about the emancipation of all humanity."

With the Arab Spring uprisings, a "sectarian wave ... washed over large parts of the Middle East", dividing the two branches of Islam, often violently.

== History ==
=== Pre-modern background ===
There are different theories as to when the ruling concept of Ayatollah Khomeini and the Islamic Republic of Iran—that Islamic jurists ought to govern until the return of the Imam Mahdi—first appeared. Mohammad-Taqi Mesbah-Yazdi (and Ervand Abrahamian), insists it was a revolutionary advance developed by Imam Khomeini. Other theories are that the idea is not at all new, but has been accepted by knowledgeable Shia faqih since medieval times, but kept from the general public by taqiya (precautionary dissimulation) (Ahmed Vaezi); that it was "occasionally" interpreted during the reign of the Safavid dynasty (1501–1702 C.E.) (Hamid Algar), argued by scholar Molla Ahmad Naraqi (1771–1829 C.E.) (Yasuyuki Matsunaga), or by Morteza Ansari (~1781–1864 C.E.) (according to John Esposito).

Developments that might be called steps easing the path to theocratic rule were the 16th-century rise of the Safavid dynasty over modern day Iran which made Twelver Shi'ism the state religion and belief compulsory; and in the late 18th century the triumph of the Usuli school of doctrine over the Akhbari. The latter change made the ulama "the primary educators" of society, dispensers mostly of the justice, overseers social welfare, and collectors of its funding (the zakat and khums religious taxes, managers of the "huge" waqf mortmains and other properties), and generally in control of activities that in modern states are left to the government. The Usuli ulama were "frequently courted and even paid by rulers" but, as the nineteenth century progressed, also came into conflict with them.

=== Era of colonialism and industrialization ===
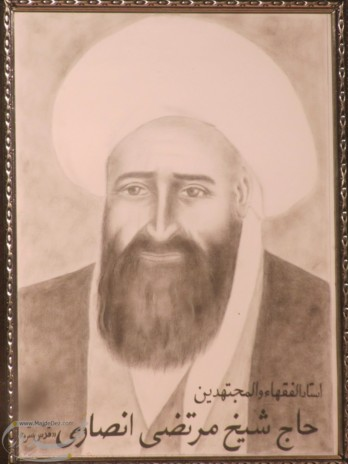
Ayatullah Sheikh Murtadha al-Ansari (Persian: مرتضی انصاری شوشتری; 1781–1864) was an Usuli Shia jurist who was the first scholar universally recognized as supreme authority in matters of Shi'i law, because of the modern printing press.

- Conditions under the Qajar Shahs. The end of nineteenth century marked the end of the Islamic Middle Ages. Like most of the Muslim world, Iran suffered from foreign (European) intrusion and exploitation, military weakness, lack of cohesion, corruption. Cheap foreign (Western) mass-manufactured products undercut those of the bazaar, bankrupting sellers, cheap foreign wheat impoverish farmers. The lack of a standing army and inferior military technology, meant loss of land and indemnity to Russia. Lack of good governance meant "'large tracts of fertile land" went to waste.
- Perhaps worst of all the indignities Iran suffered from the superior militaries of European powers were "a series of commercial capitulations." In 1872, Nasir al-Din Shah negotiated a concession granting a British citizen control over Persian roads, telegraphs, mills, factories, extraction of resources, and other public works in exchange for a fixed sum and 60% of net revenue. This concession was rolled back after bitter local opposition. Other concessions to the British included giving the new Imperial Bank of Persia exclusive rights to issue banknotes, and opening up the Karun River to navigation.
- The 1891–1892 Tobacco protest. In 1890, Nasir al-Din Shah granted a British citizen control over growth, sale and export of tobacco, in the so-called tobacco concession. This led to unprecedented nationwide protest climaxing with a fatwa by Iran's leading cleric declaring the use of tobacco to be tantamount to war against the Hidden Imam. Bazaars shut down, Iranians stopped smoking tobacco, in what has been described as a "dress rehearsal for the ... Constitutional Revolution."

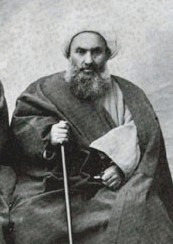
Sheikh Fazlollah Nouri (d. 1909)

- 1905–1911 Persian Constitutional Revolution and Fazlullah Nouri. Starting as protest against more foreign indignities—a foreign director of customs (a Belgian) enforcing "with bureaucratic rigidity" the tariff collections to pay (in large part) for a loan to another foreign source (Russians) that financed the shah's extravagant tour of Europe—the revolution set up a parliament to control the power of the shah. The constitutional government was eventually undermined, and the leader of that effort was a conservative cleric, Fazlullah Nouri. Like Khomeini and later Islamists who praised him he preached the idea of sharia as a complete code of social life; Unlike them he opposed modern learning, the "teaching of chemistry, physics and foreign languages", female education, and preached that "obedience to the monarchy was a divine obligation", and calling the monarch to account apostasy from Islam, a capital crime. He was hanged for "the murder of leading constitutionalists".
- Reza Shah and the Pahlavi dynasty. Combatting Iran's backwardness with secular modernizing authoritarianism were the two Pahlavi shahs, whose rule stretched from Reza Shah's seizure of power in 1921, to his son's overthrow in 1979. Reza Shah, leader of the Iranian Cossack Brigade before his coup, was a secular, nationalist dictator in the vein of Mustafa Kemal Atatürk of Turkey. Under his rule Iran was militarily united, a 100,000-man standing army created, uniform Persian culture emphasized, and ambitious development projects undertaken: 1300 km railway linking the Persian Gulf with the Caspian Sea was built, a university, and free, compulsory primary education for both boys and girls was established while private religious schools were shut down.

While his modernization efforts were significant, he was the bete noire of the clergy and pious Iranians, (not least of all Ruhollah Khomeini). His government required all non-clerical men to wear Western clothes, encouraged women to abandon hijab. He expropriated land and real estate from shrines at Mashhad and Qom, to help finance secular education, "build a modern hospital, improve the water supply of the city, and underwrite industrial enterprises." Khomeini focused his revolutionary campaign on the Pahlavi shah and all of his alleged shortcomings.

- Fada'iyan-e Islam and Navvab Safavi. 1946-Founded in 1946 by seminary student drop-out Safavi, was who sought to organize impoverished frustrated youth in his Fada'iyan-e Islam to kill and terrorize "the selfish pleasure seekers, who are hiding, each with a different name and in a different colour, behind black curtains of oppression, thievery and crime". He shared a number of traits with Khomeini and the Islamic Revolution and assassinated a number of important people. Despite his hatred of foreign oppressors, his hatred of secularist was worse. His group attempted to kill Iranian nationalist hero, Prime Minister Mohammad Mosaddegh. Leading Islamic Republic figures such as Ali Khamenei and Akbar Hashemi Rafsanjani, have indicated what an "important formative impact of Nawwāb's charismatic appeal in their early careers and anti-government activities".

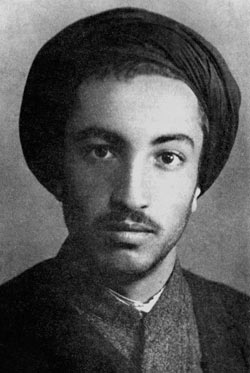
Sayyid Mojtaba Mir-Lohi, known as Navvab Safavi

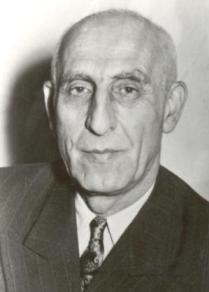
Mohammad Mosaddegh

- Mohammad Mosaddegh and the 1953 Iranian coup d'état, Mosaddegh, prime minister of Iran from 1951 to 1953, led the nationalization of the British owned Anglo-Iranian Oil Company with wide popular support, but was overthrown by a coup in 1953. The 1953 coup was "widely seen as a rupture", and "turning point when imperialist domination, overcoming a defiant challenge, reestablished itself" using "an enfeebled monarch" who would go on to "assume an authoritarian and antidemocratic posture." Despite the fact that "the bulk" of the clerical establishment including Khomeini, had not supported Mosaddegh, his supporters were part of the coalition of the 1979 Revolution.
- Demographic and social changes. Petroleum wealth and rapid population growth and urbanization in the mid 20th century, led to the migration of peasants and tribal peoples being torn from their ancestral ways; a growing the gap between the rich and the poor, rampant and well known corruption, undisguised presence and influence of foreigners, arbitrary arrests and use of torture by the secret police, alienating the broad mass of Iranians against the regime. A trend that enraged clerics like Khomeini was the growth of a modern, educated, salaried middle class, who were drawn to writers who started criticizing traditional interpretations of religion, and whose heads Khomeini called on believers to smashed "with their iron fist’.

=== Cold War literature ===
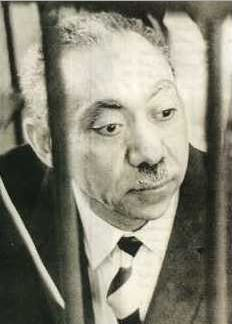
Sayyid Qutb (Arabic: سيد إبراهيم حسين قطب; 1906–1966) was an Egyptian Sunni Islamist author and a leading member of the Egyptian Muslim Brotherhood in the 1950s and 1960s.

Following World War II, Western capitalist and other anti-communist leaders were alarmed at how large, centralized and powerful the Eastern bloc of countries ruled by communist parties (now including China), had become, and the potential for its further expansion in the Third World of poor, recently decolonialized countries were socialist economic development models, and anti-imperialism was popular. In the Muslim world this led to an effort to compete with communist propaganda and the revolutionary enthusiasm of Marxist, anti-imperialist ideas by promoting works by the original Islamist thinkers, Sayyid Qutb and Abul A'la Al-Maududi (known to be deeply anti-communist), through the Muslim World League with Saudi patronage, translating them into Farsi and other languages.

The effort did not have the desired effect but helped to shape the ideology of Shi'i Islamists. Prominent figures such as current Iranian Supreme Leader Ali Khamenei and his brother Muhammad Khamenei, Aḥmad Aram, Hadi Khosroshahi, etc. translated Qutb's works into Persian. Hadi Khosroshahi was the first person to identify himself as Akhwani Shia. According to the National Library and Archives of Iran, 19 works of Sayyid Qutb and 17 works of his brother Muhammad Qutb were translated to Persian and widely circulated in the 1960s. Reflecting on this import of ideas, Ali Khamenei said:

The newly emerged Islamic movement . . . had a pressing need for codified ideological foundations . . . Most writings on Islam at the time lacked any direct discussions of the ongoing struggles of the Muslim people . . . Few individuals who fought in the fiercest skirmishes of that battlefield made up their minds to compensate for this deficiency . . . This text was translated with this goal in mind.

Concerned about the post-World War II geo-political expansion of Iran's powerful northern neighbor the Soviet Union, the Shah's regime in Iran tolerated this literature for its anti-communist value, but an indication that the Western Cold War strategy for the Muslim world was not working out as planned was indicated by the coining the term "American Islam", in 1952, by one of the authors—Sayyid Qutb—that were being translated with Saudi and Western funding. The term was later adapted by Ayatullah Khomeini after the Islamist revolution in Iran, who proclaimed:

The Islam that America and its allies desire in the Middle East does not resist colonialism and tyranny, but rather resists Communism only. They do not want Islam to govern and can not abide it to rule because when Islam governs, it will raise a different breed of humans and will teach people that it is their duty to develop their power and expel the colonialists . . . American Islam is consulted on the issued of birth control, the entry of women into Parliament, and on matters that impair ritual ablutions. However, it is jot consulted on the matter of our social and economic affairs and fiscal system, nor is it consulted on political and national affairs and our connections with colonialism.

In 1984 the Iranian authorities honoured Sayyid Qutb by issuing a postage stamp showing him behind the bars during trial.

=== Khomeini's early opposition to the shah ===
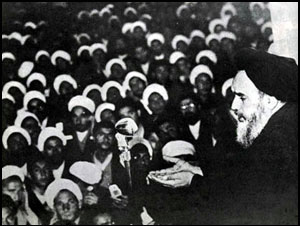
Khomeini's speech against the Shah in Qom, 1964

White Revolution

In January 1963, the Shah of Iran announced the "White Revolution", a six-point programme of reform calling for land reform, nationalization of the forests, the sale of state-owned enterprises to private interests, electoral changes to enfranchise women and allow non-Muslims to hold office, profit-sharing in industry, and a literacy campaign in the nation's schools. Some of these initiatives were regarded as Westernizing trends by traditionalists and as a challenge to the Shi'a ulama (religious scholars). Khomeini denounced them as "an attack on Islam", and persuaded other senior marjas of Qom to decree a boycott of the referendum on the White Revolution. When Khomeini issued a declaration denouncing both the Shah and his reform plan, the Shah took an armored column to Qom, and delivered a speech harshly attacking the ulama as a class.

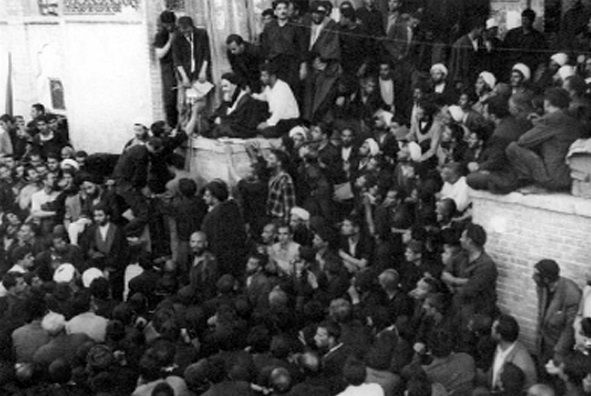
Khomeini denouncing the Shah on 'Ashura (3 June 1963)

After his arrest in Iran following the 1963 riots, leading Ayatullahs had issued a statement declaring Ayatullah Khomeini a legitimate Marja. This is widely thought to have prevented his execution.

15 Khordad Uprising

In June of that year Khomeini delivered a speech at the Feyziyeh madrasah drawing parallels between the Sunni Muslim caliph Yazid—who is perceived as a 'tyrant' by Shias and responsible for the death of Imam Ali—and the Shah, denouncing the Shah as a "wretched, miserable man," and warning him that if he did not change his ways the day would come when the people would no longer tolerate him. Two days later, Khomeini was arrested and transferred to Tehran. Following this action, there were three days of major riots throughout Iran, known as the Movement of 15 Khordad. Although they were crushed within days by the police and military, the Shah's regime was taken by surprise by the size of the demonstrations, and they established the importance and power of (Shia) religious opposition to the Shah, and the importance of Khomeini as a political and religious leader.

Opposition to capitulation

Khomeini attacked the Shah not only for the White Revolution but for violating the constitution, the spread of moral corruption, submission to the United States and Israel, and in October 1964 for "capitulations" or diplomatic immunity granted by the Shah to American military personnel in Iran. The "capitulations" aka "status-of-forces agreement", stipulating that U.S. servicemen facing criminal charges stemming from a deployment in Iran, were to be tried before a U.S. court martial, not an Iranian court.

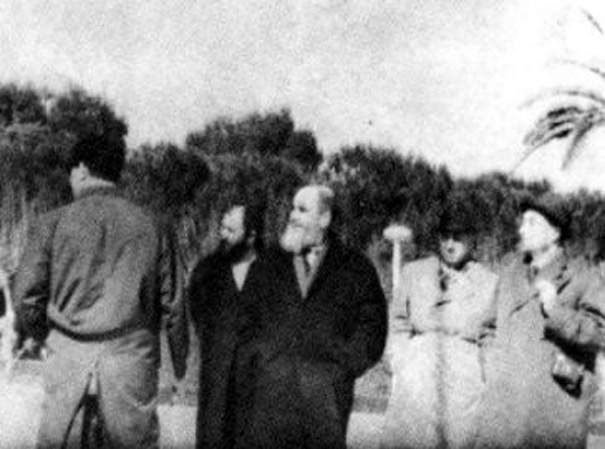
Khomeini in exile at Bursa, Turkey without clerical dress

In November 1964, after his latest denunciation, Khomeini was arrested and held for half a year. Upon his release, Khomeini was brought before Prime Minister Hassan Ali Mansur, who tried to convince him to apologize for his harsh rhetoric and going forward, cease his opposition to the Shah and his government. When Khomeini refused, Mansur slapped him in the face in a fit of rage. Two months later, Mansur was assassinated on his way to parliament. Four members of the Fadayan-e Islam, a Shia militia sympathetic to Khomeini, were later executed for the murder.

Exile

Khomeini spent more than 14 years in exile, mostly in the holy Iraqi city of Najaf (from October 1965 to 1978, when he was expelled by then-Vice President Saddam Hussein). In Najaf, Khomeini took advantage of the Iraq-Iran conflict and launched a campaign against the Pahlavi regime in Iran. Saddam Hussein gave him access to the Persian broadcast of Radio Baghdad to address Iranians and made it easier for him to receive visitors.

By the time Khomeini was expelled from Najaf, discontent with the Shah had intensified. Khomeini visited Neauphle-le-Château, a suburb of Paris, France, on a tourist visa on 6 October 1978.

=== Non-Khomeini sources of Islamism ===
==== Gharbzadegi ====
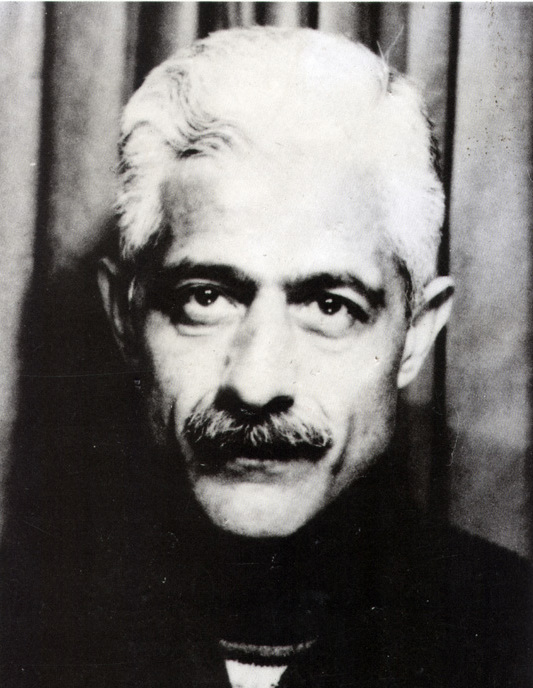
Jalal Al-e-Ahmad

In 1962, Jalal Al-e-Ahmad published a book or pamphlet called of the book Occidentosis (Gharbzadegi): A Plague from the West. Al-e-Ahmad, who was from a deeply religious family but had had a Western education and been a member of the Tudeh (Communist) party, argued that Iran was intoxicated or infatuated (zadegi) with Western (gharb) technology, culture, products, and so had become a victim of the West's "toxins" or disease. The adoption and imitation of Western models and Western criteria in education, the arts, and culture led to the loss of Iranian cultural identity, and a transformation of Iran into a passive market for Western goods and a pawn in Western geopolitics. Al-e-Ahmad "spearheaded" the search by Western educated/secular Iranians for "Islamic roots", and although he advocated a return to Islam his works "contained a strong Marxist flavor and analyzed society through a class perspective."

Al-e-Ahmad "was the only contemporary writer ever to obtain favorable comments from Khomeini", who wrote in a 1971 message to Iranian pilgrims on going on Hajj,

"The poisonous culture of imperialism [is] penetrating to the depths of towns and villages throughout the Muslim world, displacing the culture of the Qur'an, recruiting our youth en masse to the service of foreigners and imperialists..."

At least one historian (Ervand Abrahamian) speculates Al-e-Ahmad may have been an influence on Khomeini's turning away from traditional Shi'i thought towards populism, class struggle and revolution. Fighting Gharbzadegi became part of the ideology of the 1979 Iranian Revolution—the emphasis on nationalization of industry, "self-sufficiency" in economics, independence in all areas of life from both the Western (and Soviet) world. He was also one of the main influences of the later Islamic Republic president Ahmadinejad. The Islamic Republic issued a postage stamp honoring Al-e-Ahmad in 1981.

==== Socialist Shi'ism ====
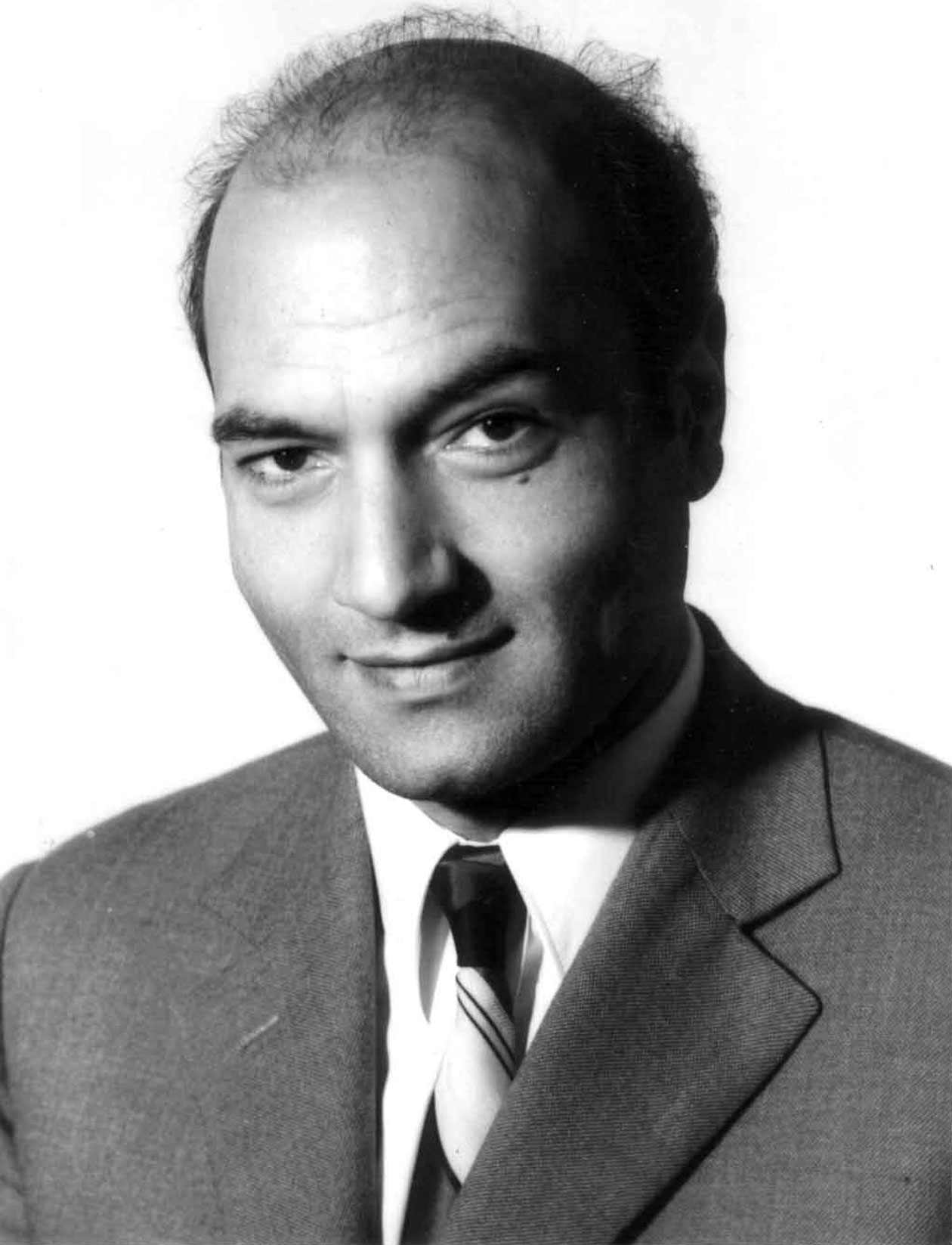
Ali Shariati (Persian: علی شریعتی مزینانی; 1933–1977)

One element of Iran's revolution not found in Sunni Islamist movements was what came to be called "Socialist Shi'ism", (also "red Shiism" as opposed to the "black Shiism" of the clerics).

Iran's education system was "substantially superior" to that of its neighbors, and by 1979 had about 175,000 students, 67, 000 studying abroad away from the supervision of its oppressive security force the SAVAK. The early 1970s saw a "blossoming of Marxist groups" around the world including among Iranian post-secondary students.

After one failed uprising, some of the young revolutionaries, realizing that the religious Iranian masses were not relating to Marxist concepts, began projecting "the Messianic expectations of communist and Third World peoples onto Revolutionary Shi'ism.", i.e. socialist Shi'ism. Ali Shariati was "the most outspoken representative of this group", and a figure without equivalent in "fame or influence" in Sunni Islam. He had come from a "strictly religious family" but had studied in Paris and been influenced by the writings of Jean-Paul Sartre, Frantz Fanon and Che Guevara.

Socialist Shia believed Imam Hussein was not just a holy figure but the original oppressed one (muzloun), and his killer, the Sunni Umayyad Caliphate, the "analog" of the modern Iranian people's "oppression by the shah". His killing at Karbala was not just an "eternal manifestation of the truth but a revolutionary act by a revolutionary hero".

Shariati was also a harsh critic of traditional Usuli clergy (including Ayatullah Hadi al-Milani), who he and other leftist Shia believed were standing in the way of the revolutionary potential of the masses, by focusing on mourning and lamentation for the martyrs, awaiting the return of the messiah, when they should have been fighting "against the state injustice begun by Ali and Hussein".

Shariati not only influenced young Iranians and young clerics, he influenced Khomeini. Shariati popularized a saying from the 19th century, 'Every place should be turned into Karbala, every month into Moharram, and every day into Ashara'. Later Khomeini used it as a slogan.

The "phenomenal popularity" of Shari'ati among the "young intelligentsia" helped open up the "modern middle class" to Khomeini. Shari'ati was often anticlerical but Khomeini was able to "win over his followers by being forthright in his denunciations of the monarchy; by refusing to join fellow theologians in criticizing the Husseinieh-i Ershad; by openly attacking the apolitical and the pro-regime `ulama; by stressing such themes as revolution, anti-imperialism, and the radical message of Muharram; and by incorporating into his public declarations such `Fanonist` terms as the `mostazafin will inherit the earth`, `the country needs a cultural revolution,` and the `people will dump the exploiters onto the garbage heap of history.`

Shariati was also influenced by anti-democratic Islamist ideas of Muslim Brotherhood thinkers in Egypt and he tried to meet Muhammad Qutb while visiting Saudi Arabia in 1969. A chain smoker, Shariati died of a heart attack while in self-imposed exile in Southampton, UK on June 18, 1977.

Ayatullah Hadi Milani, the influential Usuli Marja in Mashhad during the 1970s, had issued a fatwa prohibiting his followers from reading Ali Shariati's books and Islamist literature produced by young clerics. This fatwa was followed by similar fatwas from Ayatullah Mar'ashi Najafi, Ayatullah Muhammad Rouhani, Ayatullah Hasan Qomi and others. Ayatullah Khomeini refused to comment.

==== Baqir al-Sadr ====
In Iraq, another cleric from a distinguished clerical family, Muhammad Baqir al-Sadr (1935–1980), became the ideological founder of the Islamist Islamic Dawa Party (which had similar goals to that of Muslim Brotherhood), and author of several influential works including Iqtisaduna on Islamic economics, and Falsafatuna (Our Philosophy). Like the 1970-1980 version of Khomeini, he sought to combine populism with religious revival, claiming that "the call for return to Islam is a call for a return to God's dispensation, and necessitates a 'social revolution' against 'injustice' and 'exploitation.'"

After a military coup in 1958, a pro-soviet General Abd al-Karim Qasim came to power in Iraq, putting centers of religious learning, such as Najaf were al-Sadr worked under pressure from the Qasim regime's attempts to curb religion as an obstacle to modernity and progress. Ayatollah Muhsin al-Hakim, located in Iraq and one of the leading Shi'i clerics at the time, issued fatwa against communism. Ayatullah Mohsin al-Hakim disapproved of al-Sadr's activities and ideas. Qasim was overthrown in 1963, by the pan-Arabist Ba'ath party, but the crackdown on Shi'i religious centers continued, closing periodicals and seminaries, expelling non-Iraqi students from Najaf. Ayatullah Mohsin al-Hakim called Shias to protest. This helped Baqir al-Sadr's rise to prominence as he visited Lebanon and sent telegrams to different international figures, including Abul A'la Maududi.

==== Mahmoud Taleghani ====
Mahmoud Taleghani (1911–1979) was another politically active Iranian Shi'i cleric and contemporary of Khomeini and a leader in his own right of the movement against Shah Mohammad Reza Pahlavi. A founding member of the Freedom Movement of Iran, he has been described as a representative of the tendency of many "Shia clerics to blend Shia with Marxist ideals in order to compete with leftist movements for youthful supporters" during the 1960s and 1970s. a veteran in the struggle against the Pahlavi regime, he was imprisoned on several occasions over the decades, "as a young preacher, as a mid-ranking cleric, and as a senior religious leader just before the revolution," and served a total of a dozen years in prison. In his time in prison he developed connections with leftist political prisoners and the influence of the left on his thinking was reflected in his famous book Islam and Ownership (Islam va Malekiyat) which argued in support of collective ownership "as if it were an article of faith in Islam."

Taleghani was instrumental in "shaping the groundswell movement" that led to the Iranian Revolution and served as the chair of powerful and secret Revolutionary Council during the Islamic Revolution. he was also the first Imam for Friday Prayer in Tehran after the fall of Iran's interim government, In the late July 1979. He clashed with Khomeini in April 1979, warning the leadership against a 'return to despotism.'" After two of his sons were arrested by revolutionary Guards, thousands of his supporters marched in the streets chanting "Taleghani, you are the soul of the revolution! Down with the reactionaries!" Khomeini summoned Taleghani to Qom where he was given a severe criticism after which the press was called and told by Khomeini: "Mr. Taleghani is with us and he is sorry for what happened." Khomeini pointedly did not refer to him as Ayatollah Taleghani.

=== Usuli-Islamist clash in 1970s ===
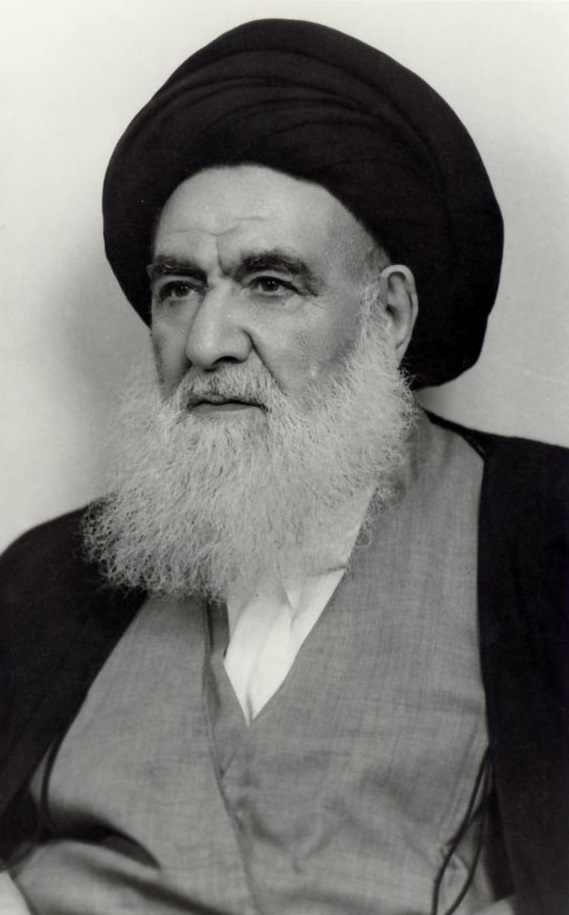
Sayyid Abul Qasim al-Khoei (Persian: سید ابوالقاسم خویی), 1992-1899 was a student of Ayatullah Na'ini.

Ruhollah Khomeini, an ambitious cleric, used to deliver public speeches on gnosis and moral steadfastness. He had studied Ibn Arabi's gnosis and Mulla Sadra's theosophy, and taught and wrote books on it. His keen interest in Plato's ideas, especially those of a Utopian society, had an impact on his political thought as well.

While in exile, Khomeini gave a series of 19 lectures to a group of his students from January 21 to February 8, 1970, on Islamic Government, and elevated Naraqi's idea of Jurist's absolute authority over imitator's personal life to all aspects of social life. Notes of the lectures were soon made into a book that appeared under three different titles: The Islamic Government, Authority of the Jurist, and A Letter from Imam Musavi Kashef al-Gita (to deceive Iranian censors). This short treatise was smuggled into Iran and "widely distributed" to Khomeini supporters before the revolution. It was "the first time a leading Shiite cleric had thrown his full weight as a doctor of the law behind the ideas of modern Islamist intellectuals."

The response from high-level Shi'a clerics to his idea of absolute guardianship of jurist was negative. Grand Ayatollah Abul-Qassim Khoei, the leading Shia ayatollah at the time the book was published rejected Khomeini's argument on the grounds that the authority of jurist in the age of occultation of the Infallible Imam, is limited to the guardianship of orphans and social welfare and most jurists believed there was an "absence of [scriptural] evidence" for extending it to the political sphere.

Arabic: أما الولاية على الأمور الحسبية كحفظ أموال الغائب واليتيم إذا لم يكن من يتصدى لحفظها كالولي أو نحوه، فهي ثابتة للفقيه الجامع للشرائط وكذا الموقوفات التي ليس لها متولي من قبل الواقف والمرافعات، فإن فصل الخصومة فيها بيد الفقيه وأمثال ذلك، وأما الزائد على ذلك فالمشهور بين الفقهاء على عدم الثبوت، والله العالم	English: "As for wilayah (guardianship) of omour al-hesbiah (non-litigious affairs) such as the maintenance of properties of the missing and the orphans, if they are not addressed to preservation by a wali (guardian) or so, it is proven for the faqih jame'a li-sharaet and likewise waqf properties that do not have a mutawalli (trustee) on behalf of waqif (donor of waqf) and continuance pleadings, the judgement regarding litigation is in his hand and similar authorities, but with regards to the excess of that (guardianship) the most popular (opinion) among the jurists is on absence of its evidence, Allah knows best."

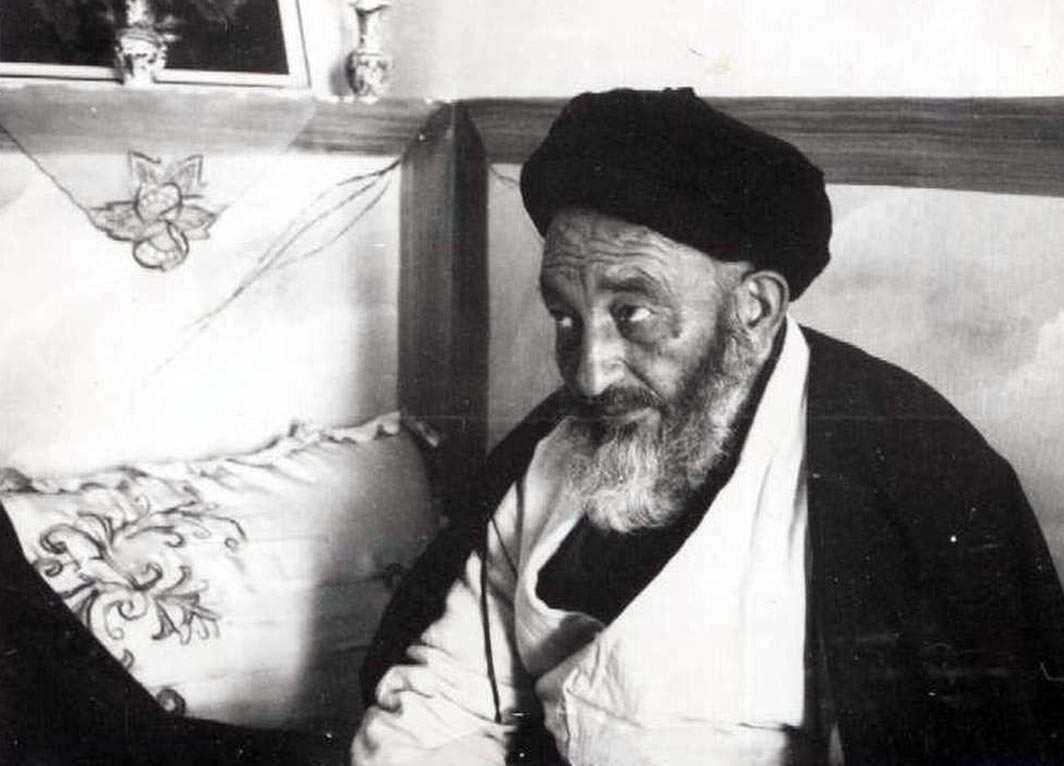
Syed Abulhassan Shamsabadi was killed by Islamists in 1976.

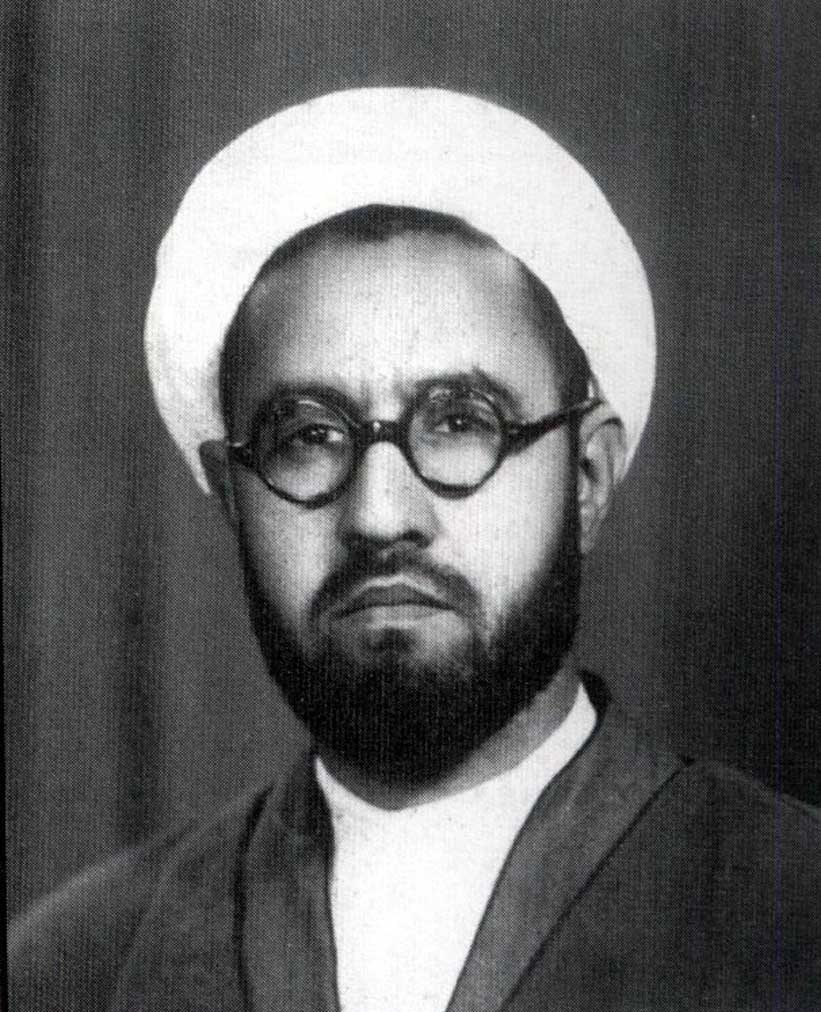
Murtaza Mutahhari (Persian: مرتضی مطهری; 31 January 1919 – 1 May 1979) was a moderate Islamist.

Ayatullah Khoei showed greater flexibility and tolerance than Islamists in accommodating modern values, for example he considered non-Muslims as equal citizens of the nation-state, stopped the harsh punishments like stoning and favored the use of holy books other than Quran for oaths taken from non-Muslims. In Isfahan, Ayatullah Khoei's representative Syed Abul Hasan Shamsabadi gave sermons criticizing the Islamist interpretation of Shi'i theology, he was abducted and killed by the notorious group called Target Killers (Persian: هدفی ها) headed by Mehdi Hashmi. At Qom, the major Marja Mohammad Kazem Shariatmadari was at odds with Khomeini's interpretation of the concept of the "Leadership of Jurists" (Wilayat al-faqih), according to which clerics may assume political leadership if the current government is found to rule against the interests of the public. Contrary to Khomeini, Shariatmadari adhered to the traditional Twelver Shiite view, according to which the clergy ought to serve society and remain aloof from politics. Furthermore, Shariatmadari strongly believed that no system of government can be coerced upon a people, no matter how morally correct it may be. Instead, people need to be able to freely elect a government. He believed a democratic government where the people administer their own affairs is perfectly compatible with the correct interpretation of the Leadership of the Jurists. Before the revolution, Shariatmadari wanted a return to the system of constitutional monarchy that was enacted in the Iranian Constitution of 1906. He encouraged peaceful demonstrations to avoid bloodshed. According to such a system, the Shah's power was limited and the ruling of the country was mostly in the hands of the people through a parliamentary system. Mohammad Reza Pahlavi, the then Shah of Iran, and his allies, however, took the pacifism of clerics such as Shariatmadari as a sign of weakness. The Shah's government declared a ban on Muharram commemorations hoping to stop revolutionary protests. After a series of severe crack downs on the people and the clerics and the killing and arrest of many, Shariatmadari criticized the Shah's government and declared it non-Islamic, tacitly giving support to the revolution hoping that a democracy would be established in Iran.

Meanwhile, in Iraq, since 1972, The Ba'ath regime in Iraq had started arresting and killing members of the Dawa party. Ayatullah Khoei, Baqir al-Sadr and Khomeini condemned the act. Sadr issued a fatwa forbidding students of religious schools and clerics from joining any political party. In 1977, the Iraqi government banned the annual Azadari commemorations in Karbala.

=== The 1979 Islamist Revolution ===
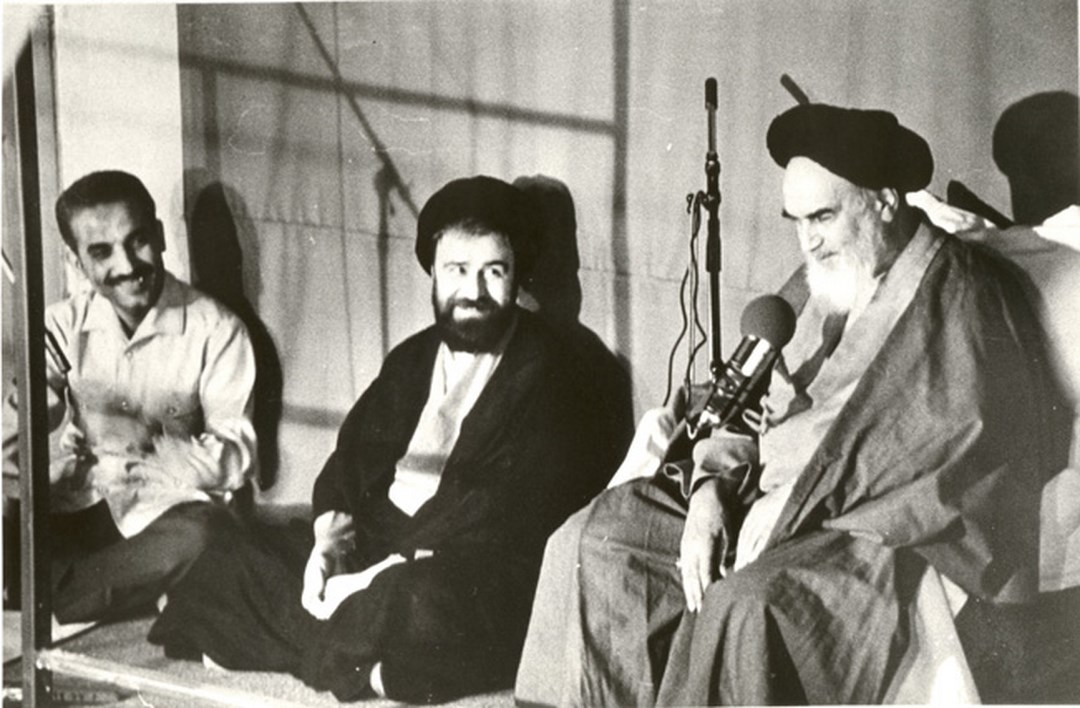
Ruhollah Khomeini in Tehran with Ahmad Khomeini and Mohammad-Ali Rajai

On 6 January 1978, an article appeared in the daily Ettela'at newspaper, insulting Ayatullah Khomeini. This has been called the moment that turned agitation into revolution as "the entire opposition" from secular middle class to urban poor "rose in his defense". Khomeini "unleashed" his partisans, and the bazaars were closed down. Frustrated youth in Qom took to the streets, six were killed. On 40th day of deaths in Qom, Tabriz saw uprising and deaths. Mullahs who had hitherto withheld support from Khomeini and his doctrines "now fell in line", providing the resources of "over 20,000 properties and buildings throughout Iran", where Muslims "gathered to talk and receive orders". The chain-reaction started and led to uprisings in all cities, starting "a spiral of provocation, repression and polarization that rose steadily until the shah was forced to depart". Seizing the moment, Khomeini gave an interview to the French newspaper Le Monde and demanded that the regime should be overthrown. He started giving interviews to western media in which he appeared as a changed man, spoke of a ‘progressive islam’ and did not mention the idea of ‘political guardianship of the jurist’. At the end of 1978, Shapour Bakhtiar, a known social democrat was chosen to help in the creation of a civilian government to replace the existing military one. He was appointed to the position of Prime Minister by the Shah, as a concession to his opposition. However his political party, National Front, expelled him. In the words of historian Abbas Milani: "more than once in the tone of a jeremiad he reminded the nation of the dangers of clerical despotism, and of how the fascism of the mullahs would be darker than any military junta". On 10 and 11 December 1978, the days of Tasu'a and Ashura, millions marched on the streets of Tehran, chanting ‘Death to Shah’, a display that political scientist Gilles Kepel has dubbed the "climax" of "general submission to Islamist cultural hegemony" in Iran.

On 16 January 1979, Shah left the country "on vacation", never to return and to die of cancer a year and a half later. By 11 February 1979, the monarchy was officially brought down and Khomeini assumed leadership over Iran while guerrillas and rebel troops overwhelmed Pahlavi loyalists in armed combat. Following the March 1979 Islamic Republic referendum, in which Iranian voters overwhelmingly approved the country's becoming an Islamic republic; several months later voters approved the new constitution and Khomeini emerged as the Supreme Leader of Iran in December 1979.

In the early days after the revolution it was praised as "a completion" of the 1905–1911 Constitutional Revolution, "a fulfillment" of Mosaddeqh's attempt to establish an Iranian "sense of independence and self-direction", "a vindication" of the insurrection against the "White Revolution".

After the success of the 1979 Islamic Revolution, the major Iranian Usuli Marja Mohammad Kazem Shariatmadari criticized Khomeini's system of government as not being compatible with Islam or representing the will of the Iranian people. He severely criticized the way in which a referendum was conducted to establish Khomeini's rule. In response, Khomeini put him under house arrest and imprisoned his family members. This resulted in mass protests in Tabriz which were quashed toward the end of January 1980, when under the orders of Khomeini tanks and the army moved into the city. Murtaza Mutahhari was a moderate Islamist and believed that a jurist only had a supervisory role and was not supposed to govern. In a 1978 treatise on modern Islamic movements, he warned against the ideas of Qutb brothers and Iqbal. Soon after the 1979 revolution, he was killed by a rival group, Furqan, in Tehran.

Shortly after assuming power, Khomeini began calling for Islamic revolutions across the Muslim world, including Iran's Arab neighbor Iraq, the one large state besides Iran with a Shia majority population. At the same time Saddam Hussein, Iraq's secular Arab nationalist Ba'athist leader, was eager to take advantage of Iran's weakened military and (what he assumed was) revolutionary chaos, and in particular to occupy Iran's adjacent oil-rich province of Khuzestan, and to undermine Iranian Islamic revolutionary attempts to incite the Shi'a majority of his country. While Khomeini was in Paris, Baqir al-Sadr in Iraq had issued a long statement to the Iranians praising their uprising. After the 1979 revolution, he sent his students to Iran to show support and called on Arabs to support the newly born Islamist state. He published a collection of six essays titled al-Islam Yaqud al-Hayat (Islam Governs Life), and declared that joining Ba'ath party was prohibited. Khomeini responding by issuing public statements supporting his cause, that resulted in an uprising in Iraq. Sadr told his followers to call off demonstrations as he sensed the Sunni dominated Ba'ath party's preparations for a crackdown. The crackdown began by his arrest, in response to which the demonstrations spread nation-wide and the government had to release him the next day. The Ba'athists started to arrest and execute the second layer of leadership and killed 258 members of the Dawa party. Dawa party responded by violence and threw a bomb at Tariq Aziz, killing his bodyguards.

Saddam Hussain had become the fifth president of Iraq on 16 July 1979, and after publicly killing 22 members of Ba'ath party during the televised 1979 Ba'ath Party Purge, established firm control over the government. Those spared were given weapons and directed to execute their comrades. On 31 March 1980, the government passed a law sentencing all present and past members of the Dawa party to death. Sadr called on people to uprising. He and his vocal sister were arrested on 5 April 1980 and killed three days later.

In September 1980, Iraq launched a full-scale invasion of Iran, beginning the Iran–Iraq War (September 1980 – August 1988). A combination of fierce resistance by Iranians and military incompetence by Iraqi forces soon stalled the Iraqi advance and, despite Saddam's internationally condemned use of poison gas, Iran had by early 1982 regained almost all of the territory lost to the invasion. The invasion rallied Iranians behind the new regime, enhancing Khomeini's stature and allowing him to consolidate and stabilize his leadership. After this reversal, Khomeini refused an Iraqi offer of a truce, instead demanding reparations and the toppling of Saddam Hussein from power.

Meanwhile, in traditional Usuli seminaries, the Islamists were facing passive resistance. In an attempt to present themselves as sole representatives of Shi'ism, the Islamists launched defamation campaign against the traditional Usuli clergy. In his "Charter of the Clergy" (Persian: منشور روحانیت), Ayatollah Khomeini wrote:

"At the religious seminaries, there are individuals who are engaged in activities against the revolution and the pure Islam (Persian: اسلام ناب محمدی). Today they are simply sanctimonious posers, some are undermining religion, revolution and system as if they have no other obligation. The menace of the foolish reactionaries and sanctimonious clerics at religious seminaries is not insignificant. . . . The first and most significant move [by the enemy] is the induction of the slogan of separation of religion from politics."

After the arrest of Ayatollah Shariatmadari and his televised forced confessions, other Usuli sources of emulation like Ayatollah Hasan Qomi, Ayatollah Muhammad Rohani and Ayatollah Sadiq Rohani were among the most prominent clerics to face the wrath of the Islamist regime.

== See also ==
- Usuli
- Akhbari
- Guardianship of the Islamic Jurist
- Fadayan-e Islam
- Clerical fascism
- Islamism
- Islamofascism
- Khomeinism

== Bibliography ==
=== Books ===
- Abrahamian, Ervand (1993). Khomeinism: Essays on the Islamic Republic. California: University of California Press. ISBN 0520081730.
- Calvert, John (July 2010). Sayyid Qutb and the Origins of Radical Islamism. London, UK: Hurst Publishers. ISBN 9781849040068.
- Farzaneh, Mateo Mohammad (March 2015). Iranian Constitutional Revolution and the Clerical Leadership of Khurasani. Syracuse, NY: Syracuse University Press. ISBN 9780815633884. OCLC 931494838.
- Malcolm Byrne (2004). "Introduction". In Gasiorowski, Mark J.; Byrne, Malcolm (eds.). Mohammad Mosaddeq and the 1953 Coup in Iran. Syracuse University Press. p. xiv.
- Graham, Robert (1980). Iran, the Illusion of Power. St. Martin's Press. ISBN 0-312-43588-6.
- Mangol, Bayat (1991). Iran's First Revolution: Shi'ism and the Constitutional Revolution of 1905-1909. Oxford, New York: Oxford University Press. ISBN 978-0-19-506822-1.
- Kadivar, محسن کدیور (2008). سیاست نامه خراسانی (in Persian). تہران: انتشارات کویر.
- Kepel, Gilles (2002). Jihad: The Trail of Political Islam. Harvard University Press. ISBN 978-0674010901. "Jihad: The Trail of Political Islam."
- Khomeini, Ruhollah (1981). Algar, Hamid (ed.). Islam and Revolution : Writing and Declarations of Imam Khomeini. Translated by Algar, Hamid. Berkeley, CA: Mizan Press. ISBN 9781483547541.
- Keddie, Nikki R. (1966). Religion and Rebellion in Iran: The Tobacco Protest of 1891–92. Frank Cass. ISBN 9780714619712.
- Kurzman, Charles (2004). The Unthinkable Revolution in Iran. Harvard University Press. ISBN 0-674-01328-X.
- Rahnema, Ali (November 1, 2005). Pioneers of Islamic Revival. London, UK: Zed Books. ISBN 9781842776155.
- Rahnema, Ali (2000). An Islamic Utopian - A Political Biography of Ali Shari'ati. London, NY: I.B. Tauris. ISBN 1860645526.
- Roy, Olivier (1994). The Failure of Political Islam. Harvard University Press. ISBN 978-0674291416.
- Sayej, Caroleen Marji (2018). Patriotic Ayatollahs. doi:10.7591/cornell/9781501715211.001.0001. ISBN 978-1-5017-1521-1.
- Wilford, Hugh (2013). America's Great Game: The CIA's Secret Arabists and the Making of the Modern Middle East. Basic Books. ISBN 978-0-465-01965-6.

=== Articles ===
- Akhavi, Shahrough (1996). "Contending Discourses in Shi'i Law on the Doctrine of Wilāyat al-Faqīh". Iranian Studies. 29 (3–4): 229–268. doi:10.1080/00210869608701850. JSTOR 4310997.
- Aziz, T. M. (May 1993). "The Role of Muhammad Baqir al-Sadr in Shi'i Political Activism in Iraq from 1958 to 1980". International Journal of Middle East Studies. 25 (2): 207–222. doi:10.1017/S0020743800058499. JSTOR 164663.
- Behdad, Sohrab (Jan 1997). "Islamic Utopia in Pre-Revolutionary Iran: Navvab Safavi and the Fada'ian-e Eslam". Middle Eastern Studies. 33 (1): 40–65. doi:10.1080/00263209708701141. JSTOR 4283846.
- Bohdan, Siarhei (August 2020). "'They Were Going Together with the Ikhwan': The Influence of Muslim Brotherhood Thinkers on Shi'i Islamists during the Cold War". The Middle East Journal. 74 (2): 243–262. doi:10.3751/74.2.14.
- Fuchs, Simon Wolfgang (24 May 2021). "A Direct Flight to Revolution: Maududi, Divine Sovereignty, and the 1979-Moment in Iran". Journal of the Royal Asiatic Society. 32 (2): 333–354. doi:10.1017/S135618632100033X. S2CID 236344952.
- Fuchs, Simon Wolfgang (July 2014). "Third Wave Shi'ism: Sayyid Arif Husain al-Husaini and the Islamic Revolution in Pakistan". Journal of the Royal Asiatic Society. 24 (3): 493–510. doi:10.1017/S1356186314000200. JSTOR 43307315. S2CID 161577379.
- Hermann, Denis (May 2013). "Akhund Khurasani and the Iranian Constitutional Movement". Middle Eastern Studies. 49 (3): 430–453. doi:10.1080/00263206.2013.783828. JSTOR 23471080.
- Keddie, Nikki R. (June 1983). "Iranian Revolutions in Comparative Perspective". The American Historical Review. 88 (3): 579–598. doi:10.2307/1864588. JSTOR 1864588.
- Khalaji, Mehdi (November 27, 2009). "The Dilemmas of Pan-Islamic Unity". Current Trends in Islamist Ideology. 9: 64–79.
- Martin, V. A. (April 1986). "The Anti-Constitutionalist Arguments of Shaikh Fazlallah Nuri". Middle Eastern Studies. 22 (2): 181–196. doi:10.1080/00263208608700658. JSTOR 4283111.
- Mashayekhi, Azadeh (2016). "Tehran, the Scene of Modernity in the Pahlavi Dynasty: Modernisation and Urbanisation Processes 1925–1979". Urban Change in Iran. The Urban Book Series. pp. 103–119. doi:10.1007/978-3-319-26115-7_9. ISBN 978-3-319-26113-3.
- Nouraie, Fereshte M. (1975). "The Constitutional Ideas of a Shi'ite Mujtahid: Muhammad Husayn Na'ini". Iranian Studies. 8 (4): 234–247. doi:10.1080/00210867508701501. JSTOR 4310208.
