= Mindaoudou =

Mindaoudou is a surname. Notable people with the surname include:

- Aïchatou Mindaoudou (born 1959), Nigerien diplomat
- Zeinabou Mindaoudou Souley (born 1964), Nigerien physicist
