= Khalida Safarova =

Azerbaijani artist (1926–2005)

- Azerbaijani: Xalidə Səfərova
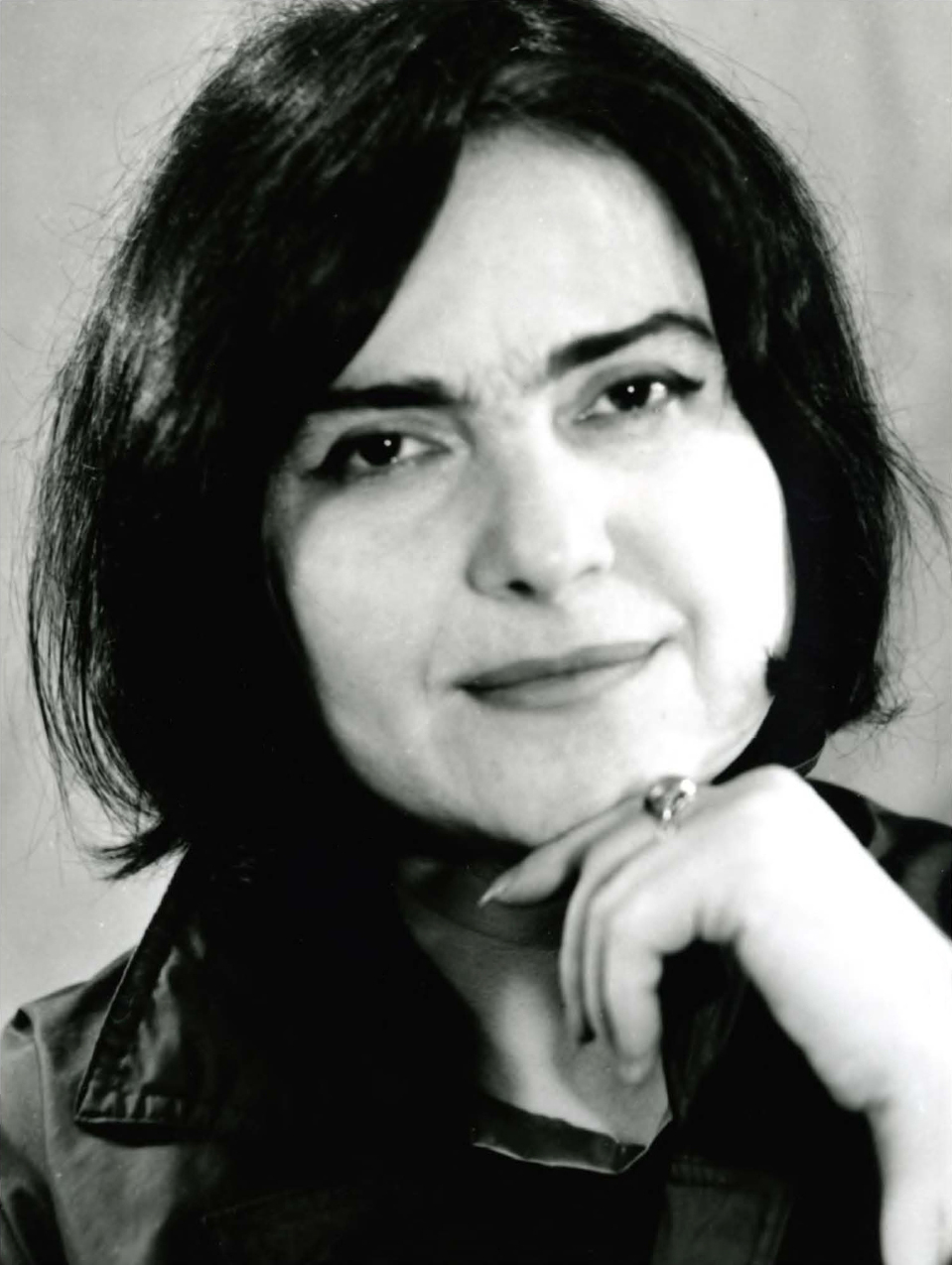
- Born: Xalidə Ələkbər qızı Səfərova; August 25, 1926; Ganja, Ganja uezd, Azerbaijan SSR, TSFSR, USSR
- Died: December 23, 2005 (aged 79); Baku, Azerbaijan
- Education: Azerbaijan State Art School named after Azim Azimzade; All-Union State Institute of Cinematography
- Known for: painter
- Style: landscape painting, still life, portrait
- Movement: impressionism
- Spouse: Mahmud Taghiyev
- Awards: People's Artist of the Azerbaijan SSR Honored Artist of the Azerbaijan SSR

Khalida Alakbar gizi Safarova (Azerbaijani: Xalidə Ələkbər qızı Səfərova, 25 August 1926 — 23 December 2005) was an Azerbaijani painter, People's Artist of the Azerbaijan SSR.

== Biography ==
Khalida Safarova was born on August 25, 1926, in Ganja. In 1941–1944 she studied at Azerbaijan State School of Art named after Azim Azimzade, and in 1949–1955 at the art faculty of All-Union State Institute of Cinematography in Moscow.

Khalida Safarova married artist Mahmud Taghiyev in 1946, and was the mother of Akram Tagiyev. The painter died on December 23, 2005, in Baku.

== Career ==
Khalida Safarova's first diploma work was "Letter from the Front". Her second diploma work – illustrations to Nizami Ganjavi's poem "Khosrow and Shirin" were exhibited at the exhibition of the USSR Academy of Arts, the anniversary of All-Union State Institute of Cinematography, as well as the film festival in Prague and Paris in 1956.

The main place in Khalida Safarova's work is taken by the genres of landscape and still life. Her still life series of flowers include "Autumn Rose" (1956), "Zinya Flower" (1971), "Spring Flowers" (1971), "Montmartre Flowers" (1985), her first works "Gulabdan", "Rose", "Wildflowers", "On the balcony", "Chrysanthemums", "Lilacs", "Lilies", "Daffodils", "Pomegranate flower".

After her visits to the regions of Azerbaijan, the artist gave he first joint report exhibition with Mahmud Taghiyev in Baku in 1947. K. Safarova participated in the exhibition with about 70 paintings and graphics, more than 150 etudes, landscapes and still lifes. The submitted works include "Three oaks", "Before the rain", "Still life in the garden", "Still life in the vineyard".

The artist's work also includes portraits. These include "Goalkeeper", "Portrait of Leyla Vakilova", "Portrait of Maral Rahmanzadeh", "Portrait of Mahmud Taghiyev" and others. She also worked on sports theme in the 1960s. Within the framework of this theme, she drew multi-figure compositions depicting football games, cycling, rowing. Her works "Gymnasts", "Relay", "Cyclist" (1969), "Footballers", "Chovken" are examples of this direction.

Khalida Safarova created many still lifes and landscapes in the regions and villages of Azerbaijan. The artist's works "Rose Bouquet", "Roses and Cypress Tree", "After the Rain", "Plane Trees", "Apple-picking Girl" depicting the life of a village, have special importance. Her works reflect the nature of Absheron, Karabakh, Agdam and other regions of Azerbaijan. Landscapes from this series include "Foggy Morning", "Spring in Meadow", "Autumn Sun", "When Cotton Blooms" and others. Her painting "Fly, pigeons" has a special place among the themes of everyday life.

The artist created the triptych "My Land" in the 1970s. The central part of the work is called "Stuffiness", and the outer parts are called "Morning" and "Evening".

In 1985, Khalida Safarova traveled to France and described the landscapes and plains of the Seine. Reflecting the autumn in Provence, the artist created works such as "Autumn in Provence", "Arl Cafe", "Port of Marseille", "Marting Coast" and many others. She worked on the paintings "Paris Notre Dame", "Purple Night", "Site" in different variants. Some of her works during her visit to France were exhibited at the exhibition of the French Embassy in Azerbaijan.

Khalida Safarova's solo exhibitions were held in Baku in 1947 (with M. Taghiyev at National Art Museum of Azerbaijan), 1980 (dedicated to the 35th anniversary of her work), 1984 and 2002 (At the French embassy), and in Moscow in 1988 (with M. Taghiyev). In addition, she participated in the V and VI Republican Exhibitions of Women Artists in Baku in 1945 and 1946. In different years of her career, the artist's works have been exhibited in Russia, Turkey, Romania, Hungary, Poland, Algeria, Israel] and other countries. Her works are kept in the United States, Germany, Russia, Turkey, the Czech Republic, in a number of museums and private collections.

== Awards ==
- Honored Artist of the Azerbaijan SSR — 5 December 1977
- People's Artist of the Azerbaijan SSR — 17 May 1989

== Sources ==
- Əsədova, X. (2013). Xalidə Səfərova. Bakı: Şərq-Qərb. pp. 104 səh. ISBN 978-9952-34-973-3.
- Məlikova, Ş. (2011). Xalidə Səfərova və Mahmud Tağıyev. Bakı: Xalq Bank. pp. 335 səh.
