= Javid Taghiyev =

Javid Taghiyev may refer to:

- Javid Taghiyev (boxer) (born 1981), Azerbaijani boxer
- Javid Taghiyev (footballer) (born 1992), Azerbaijani footballer

== See also ==
- Taghiyev
