= Taqi Tabatabaei Qomi =

Iranian Grand Ayatollah (1923-2016)

Grand Ayatollah Sayyid Taqi Tabatabaei Qomi
- السيد تقي طباطبائي القمي
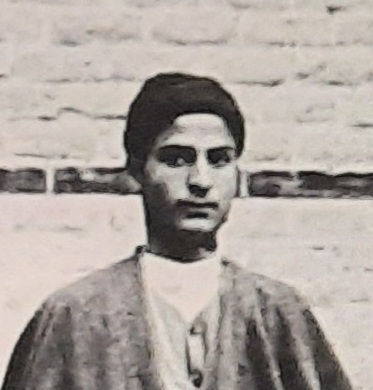
- Taqi Tabatabaei Qomi before 1947
- Title: Grand Ayatollah

Personal life
- Born: February 21, 1923 Mashhad, Iran
- Died: October 26, 2016 (aged 93) Karbala, Iraq
- Parent: Hossein Tabatabaei Qomi (father)
- Relatives: Hassan Tabatabaei Qomi (brother); Musa al-Sadr (nephew)

Religious life
- Religion: Islam
- Jurisprudence: Usuli Twelver Shia Islam

Muslim leader
- Based in: Qom, Iran
- Post: Grand Ayatollah
- Period in office: 1980–2016

Grand Ayatollah Sayyid Taqi Tabatabaei Qomi (Arabic: تقي الطباطبايي القمي Persian: تقى طباطبايى قمى, February 21, 1923–October 26, 2016) was an Iranian Shia marja'. He, along with Ali al-Sistani, and Ali Falsafi, were among the only three people to receive a written statement declaring their ijtihad by grand Ayatollah Abu al-Qasim al-Khoei.

== Birth and education ==
He was born in Mashhad, Iran. He is the son of Grand Ayatollah Hossein Tabatabaei Qomi (1865–1947) and the younger brother of Grand Ayatollah Hassan Tabatabaei Qomi (1912–2007).

In 1936 he moved to Iraq and has studied in seminaries of Karbala and then Najaf under Grand Ayatollah Mohammad Hadi Milani, ِAbd al-Hadi al-Shirazi, Hossein Heli, Mohammad Kazem Shirazi and especially Abu al-Qasim al-Khoei. He obtained his Ijtihad in 1965 in Najaf.

== Publications ==
He has written close to 50 Islamic books (mainly in Arabic), most of which are now used as the main sources of teaching in the Seminaries of Qom and Najaf.

In 1984, his statements were published in a book by Abbas Hajiani Dashti with the title Lessons from pleading (درسهایی از شفاعت).

== Political views ==
He was one of the Independent Marja and didn't like to interfere in politics. He was among those Maraji that who declined to meet Ali Khamenei in September 2010.

== Personal views ==
- He did not like to open a personal website.
- He was among the critics of Ali Shariati's ideas, and thinks some of Shariati's ideas are against Islam.
- Some of his Islamic views are mentioned in Theological answers (ردود عقائدية) website.

== See also ==
- List of maraji
