= Mahmud Taghiyev =

Azerbaijani painter

- Mahmud Tağıyev
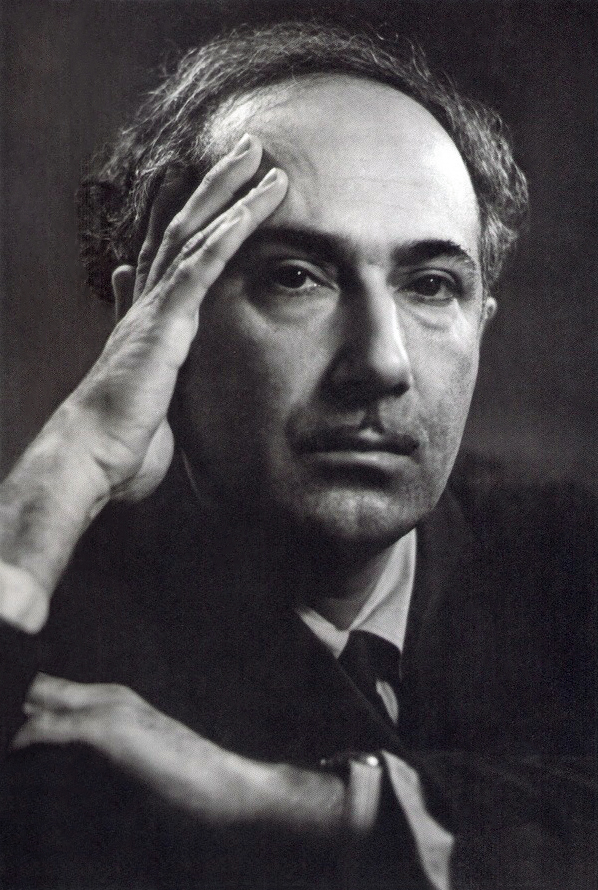
- Born: Mahmud Əzizağa oğlu Tağıyev; 11 June 1923; Baku, Azerbaijan SSR, Transcaucasian Socialist Federative Soviet Republic, USSR
- Died: 21 November 2001 (aged 78); Baku, Azerbaijan
- Education: Azerbaijan State School of Art; All-Union State Institute of Cinematography; Leningrad Institute of Art, Sculpture and Architecture named after I.E.Repin
- Known for: painter
- Style: landscape painting, portrait, still life
- Spouse: Khalida Safarova
- Awards: Honored Art Worker of the Azerbaijan SSR

Mahmud Taghiyev (Azerbaijani: Mahmud Tağıyev, 11 June 1923–21 November 2001) was an Azerbaijani painter, Honored Art Worker of the Azerbaijan SSR.

== Biography ==
Mahmud Taghiyev was born on 11 June 1923 in Baku. After graduating from Azerbaijan State School of Art in 1941, he studied at All-Union State Institute of Cinematography in Moscow, in 1949–1953, and studied at the Leningrad Institute of Art, Sculpture and Architecture named after I.E.Repin in 1953–1956.

Mahmud Taghiyev was married to painter Khalida Safarova in 1946 and had been a member of the Union of Artists of Azerbaijan since that year.

He died on 20 November 2001 in Baku.

== Creativity ==
The main themes of Mahmud Taghiyev's early creativity were still life and landscape paintings. He had been researching industrial and agricultural topics since the 1960s. The artist described the main points of the construction of Soviet buildings in Azerbaijan. These included descriptions of the Mingachevir Reservoir and Sumgait Aluminum Plant. M.Taghiyev had continued to explore portrait genre during these years and had particularly appealed to the historical portrait genre.

"Apricots" (1969), "Figs" (1974), "Balcony" (1987), "Still Life", "Spring Flowers" (1993), "Tulips", "Apples" (1993), "Majnun", "Leyli", "Flowers in the vase", "Spring in the mountains", "Baku", "Oil refinery plant lights", "Avarchakan", "Sleep", "Naked", "Dada Gorgud", "Samad Vurgun", "Seven beautiful" are famous works of the painter.

Taghiyev's exhibitions were held in Baku (together with Khalida Safarova in 1947, 1958, 1969, 1993), and in Moscow (with Kh.Safarov in 1990 and 1988). His works have been exhibited in Russia, Turkey, Ukraine, United States, UK, France, Germany, Iran, Syria and Egypt.

== Family ==
- Brother of Taghi Taghiyev
- Father of Akram Taghiyev
- Husband of Khalida Safarova

== Awards ==
- Honored Art Worker of the Azerbaijan SSR — 1 December 1982
- Diploma of the 1st Biennial of the Transcaucasian Republics (Tbilisi, Georgian SSR) — 1986
- 3rd prize at the Contest of "Contemporary Art in Azerbaijan" (It was organized by the UN Office in Azerbaijan in Baku) — 1996
