= Hassan Tabatabaei Qomi =

Iranian Grand Ayatollah (1912-2007)

Grand Ayatollah Sayyid Hassan Tabatabaei Qomi
- السيد حسن طباطبائي القمي
- Title: Grand Ayatollah

Personal life
- Born: 1912 Mashhad, Iran
- Died: June 7, 2007 (aged 94–95) Karaj, Iran
- Parent: Hossein Tabatabaei Qomi (father)
- Relatives: Taqi Tabatabaei Qomi (brother); Musa al-Sadr (nephew)

Religious life
- Religion: Islam
- Jurisprudence: Usuli Twelver Shia Islam

Muslim leader
- Post: Grand Ayatollah

Grand Ayatollah Sayyid Hassan Tabatabaei Qomi (Arabic: حسن الطباطبايي القمي; Persian: حسن طباطبايى قمى; also Seyyed Hassan Qomi, 1912–2007) was a prominent Shia marja' who (despite his name) was born in Najaf but lived in Mashhad, Iran. He was the son of Seyyed Hussein Qomi, and the brother of Seyyed Taqi Qomi.

Seyyed Hassan's teachers included Mohammad Hussein Naini, Seyyed Hussein Qomi, Mohammad Hussein Qaravi Esfahani, Sheikh Kazem Shirazi, Mirza Mohammad Aqazadeh. He opposed the Pahlavi dynasty, but after the Iranian Revolution also repeatedly criticized velayat-e faqih -- the new doctrine of revolutionary leader Ayatollah Khomeini and because of this was kept under house arrest from 1984 until his death in 2007.

His younger brother Taqi Tabatabaei Qomi is also a Twelver Shia Marja'.

== Background ==
Hassan Tabatabaei Qomi, the son of the Grand Ayatollah Qomi from Mashhad, remained under house arrest from 1984 to 2007. Beside his house arrest and limited opportunity to lecture and advice students, his importance as a theological authority was also decreased by virtue of the fact that the Islamic Republic of Iran has systematically promoted Qom throughout the past 30 years as a center of theological learning at the expense of the city of Mashhad.

In an interview with the London-based Kayhan International newspaper in June 1997, he condemned the theological basis of the Islamic Republic of Iran and described the Vilayat-e Faqih as violating Islamic principles. He also commented on the election of Mohammad Khatami to the presidency in 1997 as an indication of the rejection of the Vilayat-e Faqih on the part of the Iranian people.

== See also ==
- Special Clerical Court

== Bibliography ==
Amnesty International Report 13/24/97
