= Taqi Baharna =

Bahraini poet and diplomat (born 1930)

- تقي البحارنة
- Born: Taqi Muhammad Baharna; 1930 (age 95–96); Manama, Bahrain
- Occupations: Member of the Consultative Council, diplomat, poet, non-fiction writer
- Writing career
- Language: Arabic

Taqi Muhammad Baharna (Arabic: تقي محمد البحارنة; born 1930) is a Bahraini poet, diplomat and businessman. He was born in the capital of Manama. Educated in literature and economics, he has been Bahrain's ambassador to Egypt and headed Bahrain's mission to the Arab League. He has also published his poetry and literature in a number of Bahraini and Arab periodicals, and he has written several books.

== Biography ==
Born in 1930, Baharna was raised in Manama. He was educated at schools in Bahrain and Baghdad, then took university courses on literature, economics and Arab and Islamic affairs. He was self-employed but also became a member of the boards of a number of banks, insurance companies, chambers of commerce and other financial institutions. Appointed to several state councils, committees and official institutions, he was Bahrain's first ambassador to Egypt and headed its inaugural mission to the Arab League as a permanent delegate in 1974. He sat on the Consultative Council, Bahrain’s upper house of parliament, and chaired its foreign affairs committee from 1993 to 2002.

== Awards ==
- Order of Merit (Egypt, 1973)
- National Merit Award from prime minister, Khalifa bin Salman Al Khalifa (1992)
- King Hamad bin Isa Al Khalifa Medal (2001)
- Bahrain History and Antiquities Association Medal (2012)

== Books ==
Poetry collections:

- بنات الشعر ("Girl Poetry", 1996)
- في خاطري يبكي الحنين ("Crying Nostalgia in My Mind", 2003)
- من يضيء السراج ("Who Shines the Lamp", 2009)
- في الفجر تضيء الكلمات ("At Dawn, the Words Light Up", 2020)

Non-fiction:

- من عيون الشعر العربي ("Through the Eyes of Arabic Poetry", anthology from the pre-Islamic to the modern era)
- أوراق ملوّنة ("Coloured Paper", biography)
- نادي العروبة ("Al-Orouba SC", 1992
- مذكرات سفير البحرين والخليج العربي في عهد الاستقلال ("Memoirs of the Ambassador of Bahrain and the Arabian Gulf during the era of independence", diary from his diplomatic service days)
