= Zeinabou Taghi =

Member of the parliament of Mauritania

Zeinabou Taghi is a member of Parliament in Mauritania.

Taghi is the president of the Economic Affairs Committee.
