= Zeinabou Mindaoudou Souley =

Nigerien physicist (born 1964)

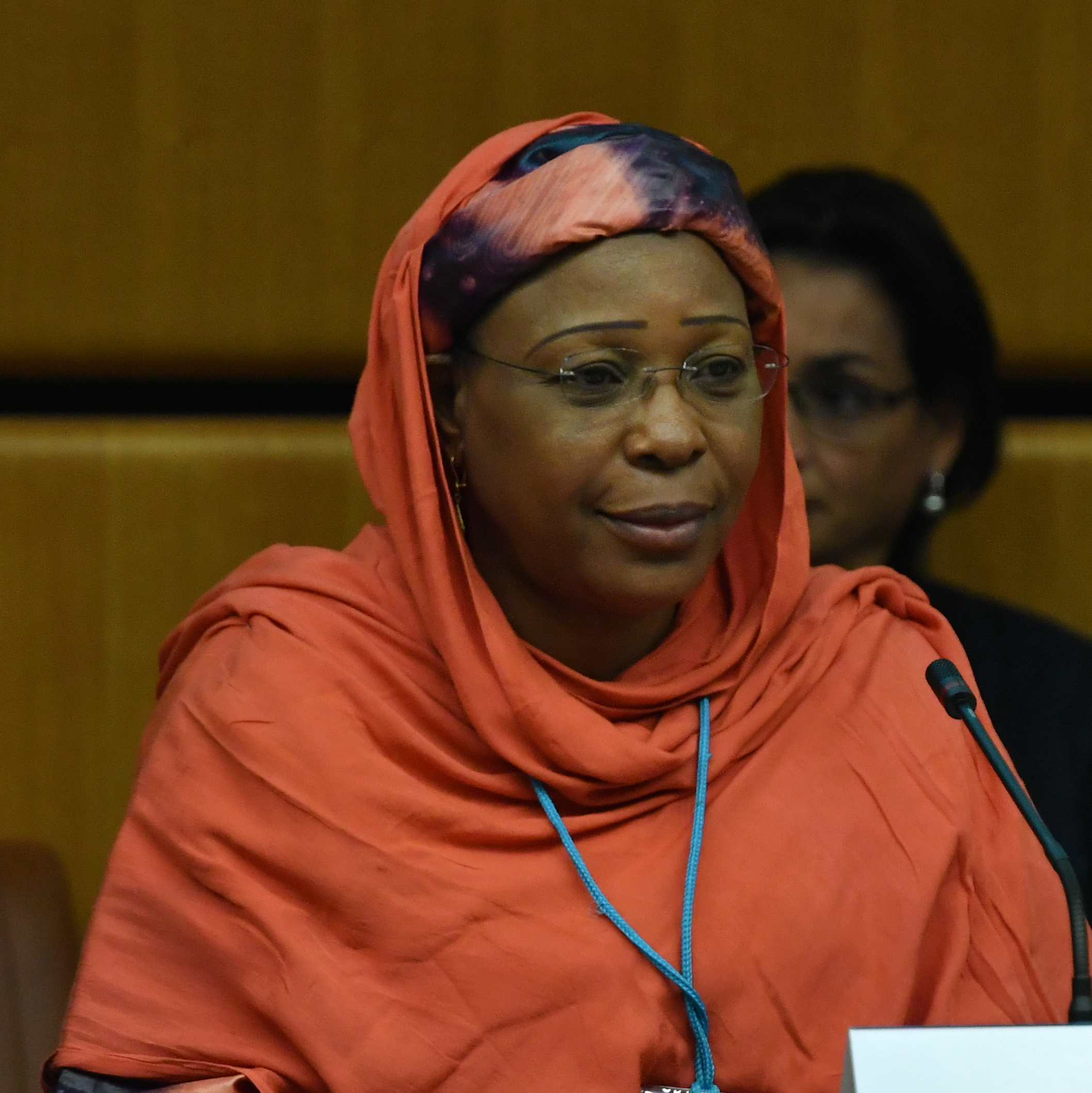
- Souley in 2019
- Born: 1964 (age 60–61)
- Education: University of Setif; Limoges University; University of Paris13
- Employer: Comprehensive Nuclear-Test-Ban Treaty Organization
- Known for: Nuclear non-proliferation oversight

Zeinabou Mindaoudou Souley (born 1964) is a Nigerien physicist. She leads the organisation that gathers the data necessary to check whether there has been a test of a nuclear explosive as part of nuclear non-proliferation oversight for the Comprehensive Nuclear-Test-Ban Treaty Organization in Vienna.

== Life ==
Souley was born in 1964 and she gained her first degree at the University of Setif in Algeria. She studied for a post-graduate degree in optical and microwave communications at Limoges University and she was awarded her applied physics doctorate from the University of Paris13.

In 2011, she began a decade of lecturing at Abdou Moumouni University in Niamey. In 2014, she became the chairperson of the High Authority for Atomic Energy of Niger. Her organisation operated stations that detected nuclear explosive testing in Niger. Niger established its own Nuclear regulatory authority and passed an all encompassing nuclear law.

In 2018, she was involved in a Women and Science events in Niger where prizes were awarded. Present were the first lady Hadjia Aïssata Issoufou Mahamadou, Kadi Alzouma and Djamila Ferdjani.

In 2018, it was recognised that Niger was in the early stages of starting a nuclear energy programme, but at the government's invitation, the International Atomic Energy Agency delivered a report evaluating Niger's progress against 19 issues to the Minister of Energy Amina Moumouni. Souley was present as President of the High Authority for Atomic Energy of Niger.

She left the High Authority for Atomic Energy of Niger in 2021 and in March 2021 she became the Director of the International Data Centre at the Comprehensive Nuclear-Test Ban Treaty Organization in Vienna.

In 2022, she visited American expert organisations. She went to Germantown in Maryland to see the company that supplies the data network before visiting a company in Chantilly, Virginia who operate eleven monitoring stations that use a number of complementary detectors including seismic and the sensing of radionuclides.
