= Sayyid Al-Qemany =

Egyptian secular writer and thinker (1947–2022)

- سيد القمني
- Born: March 13, 1947; Beni Suef, Kingdom of Egypt
- Died: February 6, 2022 (aged 74); Cairo, Egypt
- Education: Ain Shams University (B.A. 1969)
- Occupations: Secular intellectual, writer, historian, sociologist
- Writing career
- Genres: Sociology of religion, Islamic history, political critique
- Notable works: Al-Hizb al-Hashimi (الحزب الهاشمي); Al-Ustura wa al-Turas (الأسطورة والتراث); Hurub Dawlat al-Rasul (حروب دولة الرسول)
- Notable awards: State Merit Prize in Social Sciences (2009)
- Movements: Arab secularism, Enlightenment thought, critical historiography

Sayyid Al-Qemany (Arabic: سيد محمد القمني, also al-Qimni, 13 March 1947 – 6 February 2022) was an Egyptian secular writer and thinker. His works emphasize the importance of critical thinking, and he was an opponent of Islamic fundamentalism, supporting separation of religion and state, and tolerance. In 2009, he won the Egyptian Culture Ministry's prize for achievement in the social sciences, a cash award of 200,000 Egyptian pounds (about $US36,000). A judicial and media campaign was launched calling for the prize to be withdrawn by those who claimed Al-Qemany was a heretic who had harmed Islam and Muslims with his writings.

== Education ==
Al-Qemany studied philosophy at Ain Shams University. After graduation in 1969, he went to teach philosophy in the Gulf States. He later studied at Saint Joseph University in Lebanon, then he started to write his research for the University of Southern California, supervised by Fouad Zakariyya from Kuwait University.

== Views and opinions ==
Al-Qemany viewed the Quran as a historical script to be applied in understanding the ancient history of mankind, and contended that it is a legitimate to study it from a historical perspective using the same scientific tools and criteria that are employed for other disciplines.

== Criticism ==
Former Egyptian Mufti Nasr Farid Wasil called the decision to award Al-Qemany the prize "a crime against Egypt's Muslim identity." The Islamic association Jabhat 'Ulama Al-Azhar stated that Al-Qemany "has openly blasphemed in a manner that does not lend itself to [any other] interpretation." The Egyptian Muslim Brotherhood and al-Gama'a al-Islamiyya also attacked Sayyed Al-Qemany. Dar Al-Ifta, Egypt's official fatwa-issuing body, headed by Grand Mufti Ali Gomaa issued a fatwa stating in part:

The Muslims [believe] unanimously that whoever curses the Prophet or slanders Islam removes himself from the fold of Islam and [from the community] of Muslims, and deserves punishment in this world and torment in the world to come... The statements [from Al-Qimni's writings] quoted by the [individual] who requested the fatwa are heretical, regardless of who wrote them; they remove their author from the fold of Islam... and [also] constitute a crime according to Article 98 of [Egypt's] penal code. If these depraved, loathsome, and invalid statements were indeed made by a specific individual, then this individual should be convicted rather than awarded a prize, and punished to the full extent of the law...

Sheikh Youssef Al-Badri accused him of "deconstructing Islam using eloquent sugar-coated attacks ... more fatal than Salman Rushdie". Al-Qemany replied that Badri was accusing him of atheism. "Islamic scholars do not want the Muslim to use his God-given brain! They want a submissive and obedient Muslim who refers to them in the slightest details of his life."

Egyptian liberals came to Al-Qemany's defence and called on the government to defend him against accusations of heresy "which are tantamount to incitement to murder." Human rights activists, academics, and journalists issued a petition of solidarity with him.

In 2016, public opinion was agitated after the public prosecutor forwarded a communication filed by the lawyer Khaled Al-Masry against Sayyid Al-Qemany on the charge of “contempt of the Islamic religion and insulting the companions." It was reported that he participated in a symposium that was held in the Adhoc organization in Belgium, involving not only an insult to the Divine, the Prophet, and his companions, but also expressions of contempt for the Islamic religion.

== Personal life and death ==
Al-Qemany died in Cairo on 6 February 2022, at the age of 74.

== Books ==
- The Religious and Democracy (ahl al-din wal-dimuqratiyah), 2005.
- Thank You ... Bin Laden!! (Shukran ... bin Laden!!), 2004.
- The Islamic Groups: a view from within (al-jama'aat al-islamiyah ru'yah min al-dakhil), 2004.
- Traditions About the Tribe of Israel (al-isra'iliyat), 2002.
- Islamic Traditions (al-islamiyat), 2001.
- Israel: Revolution, History, Delusion (isra'il, al-thawrah al-tarikh al-tadlil), 2000.
- The Creation Story (qissat al-khalq), 1999.
- The Other Question (al-su'al al-akhar), 1998.
- The Wars of the Prophet's State (hurub dawlat al-rusul), 1996.
- The Unknown History of the Prophet Abraham (al-nabi ibrahim wal-tarikh al-majhul), 1996.
- The Prophet Moses and the Last Days of Tel el Amarna (al-nabi musa wa'akhar ayyam tal al-'amarna), 1987.
- Get out of our mosques
- Myth and heritage
- The hijab and the 17th summit
- The Hashemite Party and the establishment of the Islamic State: The role of the Hashemite Party and the Hanafi doctrine in paving the way for the establishment of a state Islamic Arabs (an introduction to reading the social reality of pre-Islamic Arabs and its ideological secretions) 1996
- The Islamic State and its immediate ruin
- The Muslim country turned backwards
- Fascists and the homeland
- Islamists and the homeland
- Abrogation in revelation: an attempt to understand
- Muslims' relapse into paganism: Diagnosis before reform
- Lord of the revolution: Osiris and the doctrine of immortality in ancient Egypt
- Lord of time, the book and the case file
- Our awakening, may God not bless it
- An introduction to understanding biblical mythology

== See also ==
- Lists of Egyptians
- Farag Foda
- Nasr Abu Zayd
- Muhammad Sa'id al-'Ashmawi
