= Jihadism =

Islamist movements for jihad

Jihadism is the ideology of modern, armed militant Islamic movements that seek to establish states based on Islamic principles. In a narrower sense, it refers to the idea that armed confrontation is an efficient and theologically legitimate method of sociopolitical change towards an Islamic system of governance. The term "jihadism" has been applied to various Islamic extremist and/or Islamist individuals and organizations with militant ideologies based on the classical Islamic notion of lesser jihad.

Jihadism has its roots in the late 19th- and early 20th-century ideological developments of Islamic revivalism, which further developed into Qutbism and Salafi jihadism related ideologies during the 20th and 21st centuries. Jihadist ideologues envision jihad as a "revolutionary struggle" against the international order to unite the Muslim world under Islamic law.

The Islamist organizations that participated in the Soviet–Afghan War of 1979 to 1989 reinforced the rise of jihadism, which has since propagated during various armed conflicts. Jihadism rose in prominence after the 1990s; by one estimate, 5 percent of civil wars involved jihadist groups in 1990, but this grew to more than 40 percent by 2014. Conflicts involving jihadist groups tend to be particularly intractable. With the rise of the Islamic State (IS) militant group in 2014—which a large contingent of Jihadist groups have opposed—large numbers of foreign Muslim volunteers came from abroad to join the militant cause in Syria and Iraq.

French political scientist and professor Gilles Kepel also identified a specific Salafist version of jihadism in the 1990s. Jihadism with an international, pan-Islamist scope is also known as global jihadism. The term has also been invoked to retroactively characterise the military campaigns of historic Islamic empires, and the later Fula jihads in West Africa in the 18th and 19th centuries.

== Terminology ==
Jihadist variation of the Black Standard as used by various Islamist organizations since the late 1990s, which consists of the Shahada in white script centered on a black background

The concept of jihad ("exerting"/"striving"/"struggling") is fundamental to Islam and has multiple uses, with greater jihad (internal jihad), meaning internal struggle against evil in oneself, and lesser jihad (external jihad), which is further subdivided into jihad of the pen/tongue (debate or persuasion) and jihad of the sword (warfare). The latter form of jihad has meant conquest and conversion in the classical Islamic interpretation, usually excepting followers of other monotheistic religions. Modernist Islamic scholars generally equate military jihad with defensive warfare. Much of contemporary Muslim opinion considers internal jihad to have primacy over external jihad in the Islamic tradition, while many Western writers favor the opposite view. Today, the word jihad is often used without religious connotations, like the English term crusade.

The term "jihadism" has been in use since the 1990s, more widely in the aftermath of the 9/11 attacks in the United States. It was first used by the Indian and Pakistani mass media, and by French academics, who used the more exact term "jihadist-Salafist". (Note: Gilles Kepel used the variants jihadist-salafist (p. 220), jihadism-salafism (p. 276), salafist-jihadism (p. 403) in his book Jihad: The Trail of Political Islam (Harvard: Harvard University Press, 2002)) Historian David A. Charters defines "jihadism" as "a revolutionary program whose ideology promises radical social change in the Muslim world... [with] a central role to jihad as an armed political struggle to overthrow "apostate" regimes, to expel their infidel allies, and thus to restore Muslim lands to governance by Islamic principles." According to Reuven Firestone, the term "jihadism" as commonly used in the Western world describes "militant Islamic movements that are perceived as existentially threatening to the West."

David Romano, researcher of political science at McGill University in Montreal, Quebec, has defined his use of the term as referring to "an individual or political movement that primarily focuses its attention, discourse, and activities on the conduct of a violent, uncompromising campaign that they term a jihad". Following Daniel Kimmage, he distinguishes the jihadist discourse of jihad as a global project to remake the world from the resistance discourse of groups such as Hezbollah, which is framed as a regional project against a specific enemy.

"Jihadism" has been defined otherwise as a neologism for militant, predominantly Sunnī Islamic movements that use ideologically motivated violence to defend the Ummah (the collective Muslim world) from foreign non-Muslims and those that they perceive as domestic infidels. The term "jihadist globalism" is also often used in relation to Islamic terrorism as a globalist ideology, and more broadly to the war on terror. Austrian-American academic Manfred B. Steger, Professor of Sociology at University of Hawaiʻi at Mānoa, proposed an extension of the term "jihadist globalism" to apply to all extremely violent strains of religiously influenced ideologies that articulate the global imaginary into concrete political agendas and terrorist strategies; these include al-Qaeda, Jemaah Islamiyah, Hamas, and Hezbollah, which he finds "today's most spectacular manifestation of religious globalism".

According to Jewish-American political scientist Barak Mendelsohn, "the overwhelming majority of Muslims reject jihadi views of Islam. Furthermore, as the cases of Saudi and other Gulf regimes show, states may gain domestic legitimacy through economic development and social change, rather than based on religion and piety". Many Muslims do not use the terms "jihadism" or "jihadist", disliking the association of illegitimate violence with a noble religious concept, and instead prefer the use of delegitimising terms such as "deviants". (Note: Use of "jihadism" has been criticized by at least one academic (Brachman): "'Jihadism' is a clumsy and controversial term. It refers to the peripheral current of extremist Islamic thought whose adherents demand the use of violence in order to oust non-Islamic influence from traditionally Muslim lands en route to establishing true Islamic governance in accordance with Sharia, or God's law. The expression's most significant limitation is that it contains the word Jihad, which is an important religious concept in Islam. For much of the Islamic world, Jihad simply refers to the internal spiritual campaign that one wages with oneself.") Maajid Nawaz, founder and chairman of the anti-extremism think tank Quilliam, defines jihadism as a violent subset of Islamism: "Islamism [is] the desire to impose any version of Islam over any society. Jihadism is the attempt to do so by force."

"Jihad Cool" is a term for the rebranding of militant jihadism as fashionable, or "cool", to younger people through consumer culture, social media, magazines, Rap videos, toys, propaganda videos, and other means. It is a subculture mainly applied to individuals in developed nations who are recruited to travel to conflict zones on jihad. For example, jihadi rap videos make participants look "more MTV than Mosque", according to NPR, which was the first to report on the phenomenon in 2010. To justify their acts of religious violence, jihadist individuals and networks resort to the nonbinding genre of Islamic legal literature (fatwa) developed by Salafi-jihadist legal authorities, whose legal writings are shared and spread via the Internet.

== History ==
=== Key influences ===
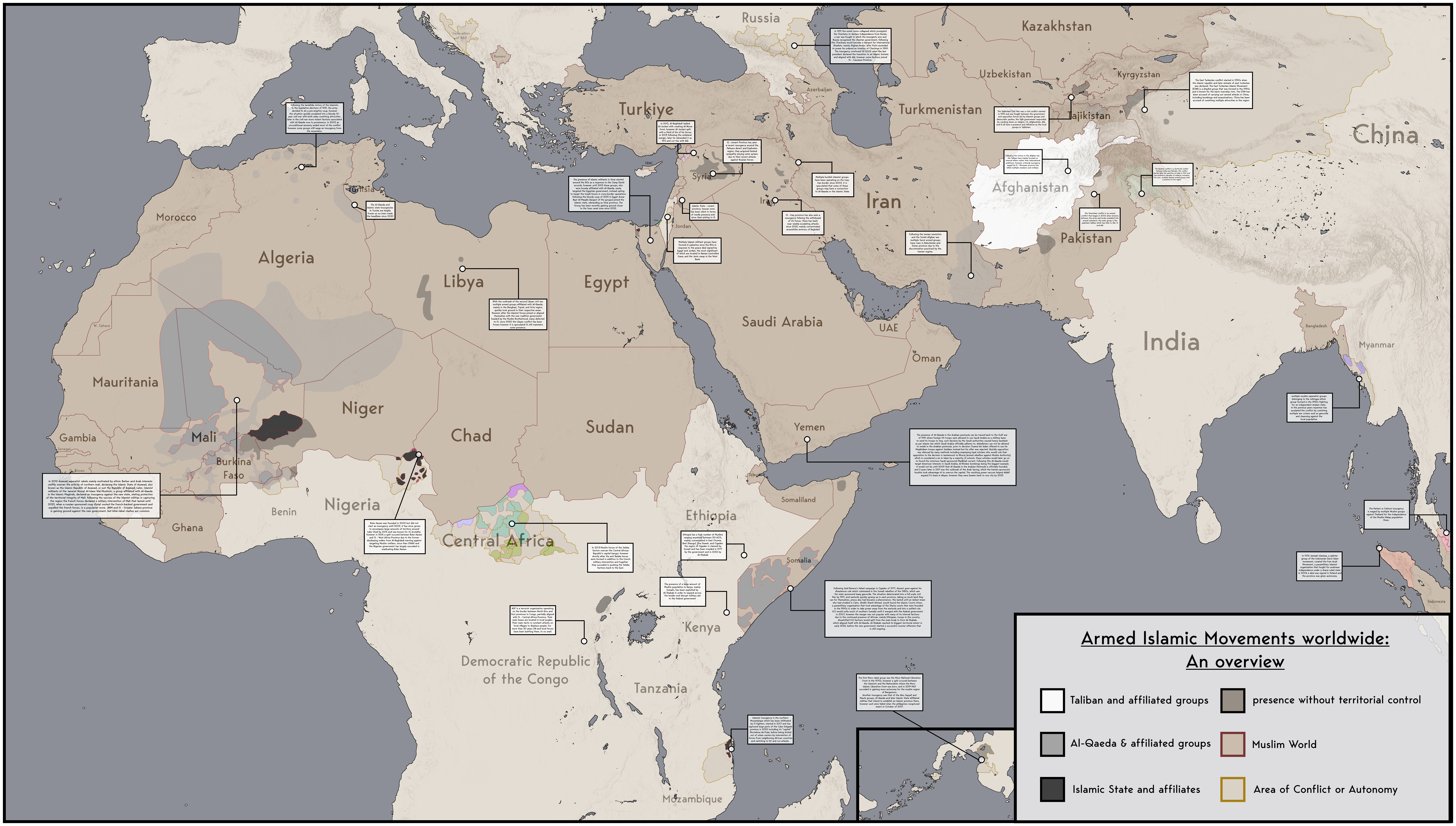
Territorial presence of jihadist groups and overview of the situation in each region

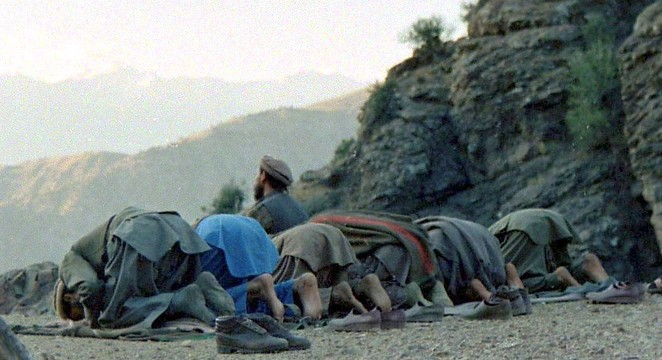
Afghan mujahideen praying in the Kunar Province, Afghanistan (1987)

Islamic extremism dates back to the early history of Islam with the emergence of the Kharijites in the 7th century CE. The original schism between Kharijites and Shīʿas among Muslims was disputed over the political and religious succession to the guidance of the Muslim community (Ummah) after the death of the Islamic prophet Muhammad. From their essentially political position, the Kharijites developed extreme doctrines that set them apart from both mainstream Sunnī and Shīʿa Muslims. Shīʿas believe ʿAlī ibn Abī Ṭālib is the true successor to Muhammad, while Sunnīs consider Abu Bakr to hold that position. The Kharijites broke away from both the Shīʿas and the Sunnīs during the First Fitna (the first Islamic Civil War); they were particularly noted for adopting a radical approach to takfīr (excommunication), whereby they declared both Sunnī and Shīʿa Muslims to be either infidels (kuffār) or false Muslims (munāfiḳūn), and therefore deemed them worthy of death for their perceived apostasy (ridda).

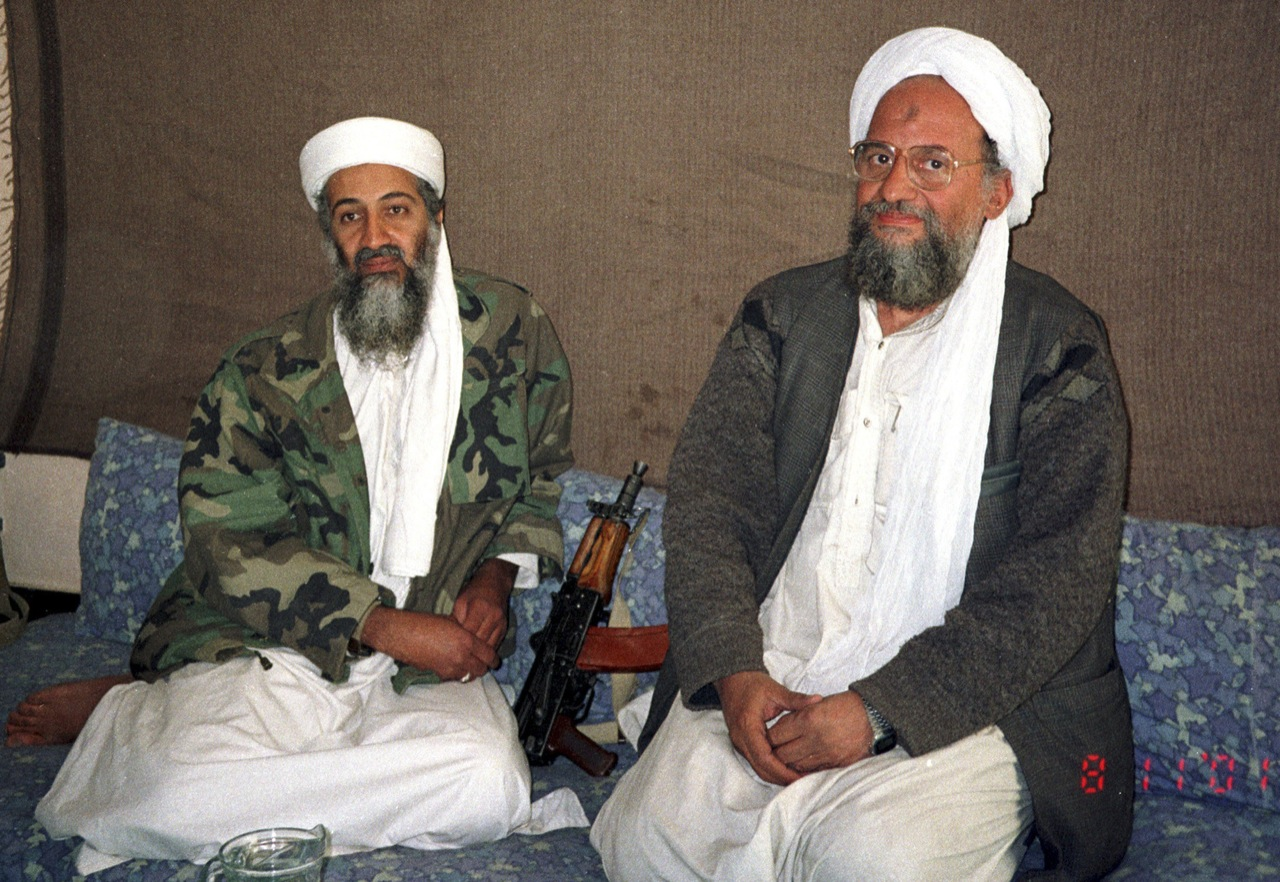
Osama bin Laden and Ayman al-Zawahiri of al-Qaeda promoted the overthrow of secular governments.

Sayyid Qutb, an Egyptian Islamist ideologue and a prominent leader of the Muslim Brotherhood in Egypt, was an influential promoter of the Pan-Islamist ideology during the 1960s. When he was executed by the Egyptian government under the regime of Gamal Abdel Nasser, Ayman al-Zawahiri formed Egyptian Islamic Jihad, an organization which seeks to replace the government with an Islamic state that would reflect Qutb's ideas about the Islamic revival that he yearned for. The Qutbist ideology has been influential among jihadist movements and Islamic terrorists who seek to overthrow secular governments, most notably Osama bin Laden and Ayman al-Zawahiri of al-Qaeda, as well as the Salafi-jihadist terrorist group ISIL/ISIS/IS/Daesh. Moreover, Qutb's books have been frequently been cited by Osama bin Laden and Anwar al-Awlaki.

Sayyid Qutb could be said to have founded the actual movement of radical Islam. Unlike the other Islamic thinkers who have been mentioned above, Qutb was not an apologist. He was a prominent leader of the Muslim Brotherhood and a highly influential Islamist ideologue, and the first to articulate these anathemizing principles in his magnum opus Fī ẓilāl al-Qurʾān (In the shade of the Qurʾān) and his 1966 manifesto Maʿālim fīl-ṭarīq (Milestones), which lead to his execution by the Egyptian government of Gamal Abdel Nasser in 1966. Other Salafi movements in the MENA region and across the Muslim world adopted many of his Islamist principles.

According to Qutb, the Muslim community (Ummah) has been extinct for several centuries and it has also reverted to jahiliyah (the pre-Islamic age of ignorance) because those who call themselves "Muslims" have failed to follow the Islamic law (sharīʿa). In order to restore Islam, bring back its days of glory, and free the Muslims from the clasps of ignorance, Qutb proposed the rejection and shunning of modern society, establishing a vanguard which was modeled after the early Muslim generations (Salaf), preaching Islam, and bracing oneself for poverty or even bracing oneself for death in preparation for jihad against what he perceived was a jahili government/society, and the overthrow of them. Qutbism, the radical Islamist ideology which is derived from the ideas of Qutb, was denounced by many prominent Muslim scholars as well as by other members of the Egyptian Muslim Brotherhood, like Yusuf al-Qaradawi.

== Sunni jihadism ==
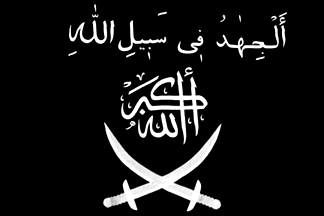
Jihadist variation of the Black Standard as used by Caucasian jihadists in 2002 displays the phrase al-jihād fī sabīlillāh above the takbīr and two crossed swords

According to Rudolph F. Peters, contemporary traditionalist Muslims "copy phrases of the classical works on fiqh" in their writings on jihad; Islamic modernists "emphasize the defensive aspect of jihad, regarding it as tantamount to bellum justum in modern international law; and the contemporary fundamentalists (Abul A'la Maududi, Sayyid Qutb, Abdullah Azzam, etc.) view it as a struggle for the expansion of Islam and the realization of Islamic ideals."

Some of the earlier Muslim scholars and theologians who had profound influence on Islamic fundamentalism and the ideology of contemporary jihadism include the medieval Muslim thinkers Ibn Taymiyyah, Ibn Kathir, and Muhammad ibn ʿAbd al-Wahhab, alongside the modern Islamist ideologues Muhammad Rashid Rida, Sayyid Qutb, and Abul A'la Maududi. Jihad has been propagated in modern fundamentalism beginning in the late 19th century, an ideology that arose in the context of struggles against colonial powers in North Africa at that time, as in the Mahdist War in Sudan, and notably in the mid-20th century by Islamic revivalist authors such as Sayyid Qutb and Abul Ala Maududi.

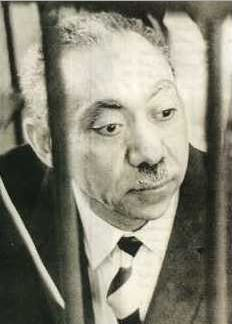
Egyptian Muslim scholar Sayyid Qutb through his prison-writings constituted the ideological basis of the Salafi-jihadist movement.

The term "jihadism" has arisen in the 2000s to refer to the contemporary jihadist movements, the development of which was in retrospect traced to developments of Salafism paired with the origins of al-Qaeda in the Soviet–Afghan War during the 1980s. Forerunners of Salafi jihadism principally include Egyptian militant scholar and theoretician Sayyid Qutb, who developed "the intellectual underpinnings" in the 1950s, for what would later become the doctrine of most Salafi-jihadist terrorist organizations around the world, including al-Qaeda and Islamic State. Going radically further than his predecessors, Qutb called upon Muslims to form an ideologically committed vanguard that would wage armed jihad against the secular, democratic states and Western-allied governments in the Arab world, until the restoration of Islamic rule. Ayman al-Zawahiri, the Egyptian-born pan-Islamist militant and physician who was second in command and co-founder of al-Qaeda, called Qutb "the most prominent theoretician of the fundamentalist movements".

The Soviet–Afghan War (1979–1989) is said to have "amplified the jihadist tendency from a fringe phenomenon to a major force in the Muslim world." It served to produce foot soldiers, leadership, and organization. Abdullah Yusuf Azzam provided propaganda for the Afghan cause. After the war, veteran jihadists returned to their home countries, and from there would disperse to other sites of conflict involving Muslim populations, such as Algeria, Bosnia, and Chechnya, creating a "transnational jihadist stream."

An explanation for jihadist willingness to kill civilians and self-professed Muslims on the grounds that they were actually apostates (takfīr) is the vastly reduced influence of the traditional diverse class of ulama, often highly educated Islamic jurists. In "the vast majority" of Muslim countries during the post-colonial world of the 1950s and 1960s, the private religious endowments (awqāf) that had supported the independence of Islamic scholars and jurists for centuries were taken over by the state. The jurists were made salaried employees and the nationalist rulers naturally encouraged their employees (and their employees' interpretations of Islam) to serve the rulers' interests. Inevitably, the jurists came to be seen by the Muslim public as doing this.

Into this vacuum of religious authority came aggressive proselytizing, funded by tens of billions of dollars of petroleum-export money from Saudi Arabia. The version of Islam being propagated (Saudi doctrine of Wahhabism) billed itself as a return to pristine, simple, straightforward Islam, not one school among many, and not interpreting Islamic law historically or contextually, but as the one, orthodox "straight path" of Islam. Unlike the traditional teachings of the jurists, who tolerated and even celebrated divergent opinions and schools of thought and kept extremism marginalized, Wahhabism had "extreme hostility" to "any sectarian divisions within Islam".

=== Salafi jihadism ===
The Egyptian Islamist movements of the 1950s are generally considered to be the precursors of contemporary Salafi-jihadist groups. The theological doctrines of the Syrian-Egyptian Islamic scholar Rashid Rida (1865–1935) greatly influenced these movements. Amongst his notable ideas included reviving the traditions of the early Muslim generations (Salaf), as well ridding the Muslim world of Western influences and jahiliyyah (pre-Islamic ignorance) by specifically looking up to the model of Khulafa Rashidun. Rida's ideas would set the foundations of future Salafi-Jihadist movements and greatly influence Islamists like Hassan al-Banna, Sayyid Qutb, and other Muslim fundamentalist figures. Rida's treatises laid the theological framework of future militants who would eventually establish the Salafi-jihadist movement.

In 2003, CIA officer Marc Sageman described Salafi jihadism as a "Muslim revivalist social movement" with "roots in Egypt". According to Sageman, Salafi jihadists are influenced by the strategy of prominent Egyptian Islamist ideologues such as Sayyid Qutb and Muhammad 'Abd al-Salam Faraj, who advocated the revolutionary overthrow of secular regimes and the establishment of Islamic states through armed jihad. According to French political scientist and professor Gilles Kepel, the Salafist version of jihadism combined "respect for the sacred texts in their most literal form, ... with an absolute commitment to jihad, whose number-one target had to be America, perceived as the greatest enemy of the faith." Kepel wrote that the Salafis whom he encountered in Europe in the 1980s, were "totally apolitical". However, by the mid-1990s, he met some who felt jihad in the form of "violence and terrorism" was "justified to realize their political objectives". The mingling of many Salafists who were alienated from mainstream European society with violent jihadists created "a volatile mixture".

In the 1990s, militant Islamists of the al-Jama'a al-Islamiyya were active in the terrorist attacks on police, government officials, and foreign tourists in Egypt, while the Armed Islamic Group of Algeria was one of the prominent Islamic extremist groups active during the Algerian Civil War. In Afghanistan, the Taliban are adherents of the Deobandi movement, not the Salafi school of Islam, but they closely cooperated with bin Laden and various Salafi-jihadist leaders.

In Iraq, resentment amongst Sunnis over their marginalization after the fall of the Ba'athist regime in 2003 led to the rise of jihadist networks in the region, which resulted in the al-Qaeda led insurgency in Iraq. De-Ba'athification policy initiated by the new government led to rise in support of jihadists and remnants of Iraqi Ba'athists started allying with al-Qaeda in their common fight against the United States. Iraq War journalist George Packer writes in The Assassins' Gate:

"The Iraq War proved some of the Bush administration's assertions false, and it made others self-fulfilling. One of these was the insistence on an operational link between Iraq and al-Qaeda... after the fall of the regime, the most potent ideological force behind the insurgency was Islam and its hostility to non-Islamic intruders. Some former Baathist officials even stopped drinking and took to prayer. The insurgency was called mukawama, or resistance, with overtones of religious legitimacy; its fighters became mujahideen (holy warriors) and proclaimed their mission to be jihad."

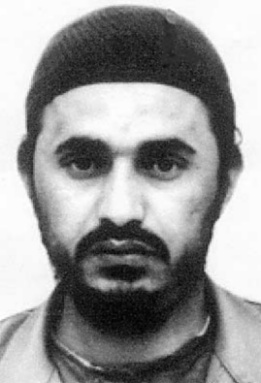
Abu Mus'ab al-Zarqawi, former leader of al-Qaeda in Iraq, is widely regarded as one of the influential Salafi jihadists.

The 2021 re-establishment of the Islamic Emirate of Afghanistan and the 2024 establishment of the post-Assad Syrian Arab Republic grew out of the Salafi-jihadist groups Taliban and Hay'at Tahrir al-Sham, respectively.

=== Ideologists of Salafi jihadism ===
"Theoreticians" of Salafi jihadism include Afghan jihadist veterans such as the Palestinian Abu Qatada, the Syrian Mustafa Setmariam Nasar, the Egyptian Mustapha Kamel, known as Abu Hamza al-Masri. Al-Qaeda's second leader and co-founder Ayman al-Zawahiri would praise Sayyid Qutb and his writings, stating that Qutb's call formed the ideological inspiration for the contemporary Salafi-jihadist movement. Other leading figures in the movement include Anwar al-Awlaki, former leader of Al-Qaeda in the Arabian Peninsula (AQAP); Abu Bakar Bashir, leader of the banned Indonesian militant Islamist group Jema'ah Islamiyah; Nasir al-Fahd, Saudi Arabian Salafi-jihadist scholar who opposes the Kingdom of Saudi Arabia and reportedly pledged allegiance to Islamic State; Mohammed Yusuf, founder of the Islamic terrorist organization Boko Haram; Omar Bakri Muhammad, Abu Bakr al-Baghdadi, first leader of the Islamic terrorist organization Islamic State; etc.

=== Salafi-jihadist groups ===
Salafist-jihadist groups include al-Qaeda, Salafia Jihadia, the now defunct Algerian Armed Islamic Group (GIA), and the Egyptian group Al-Gama'a al-Islamiyya which still exists.

==== Salafia Jihadia ====
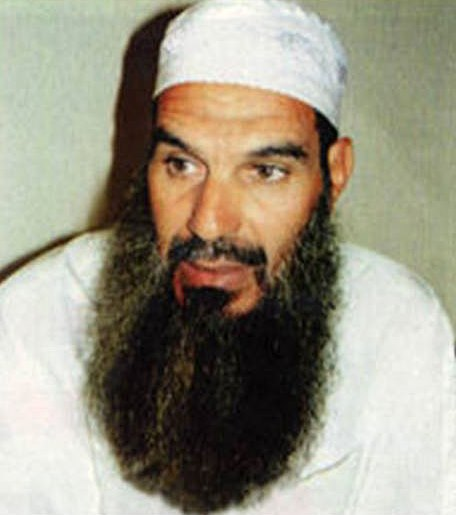
Mohamed Fizazi, ideologist of Salafia Jihadia

Salafia Jihadia is a Salafi-jihadist terrorist organization based in Morocco and Spain. The group was allied with al-Qaeda and Moroccan Islamic Combatant Group (GICM).

The group was known for its participation in the 2003 Casablanca bombings, in which 12 suicide bombers killed 33 people and injured over 100. Salafia Jihadia has variously been described as a movement or loose network of Salafi-jihadist groups and cells, or as a generic term applied by Moroccan authorities for militant Salafi activists.

Salafia Jihadia is said to function as a network of several loosely affiliated Salafi-jhadist groups and cells, including groups such as al Hijra Wattakfir, Attakfir Bidum Hijra, Assirat al Mustaqim, Ansar al Islam and Moroccan Afghans. The spiritual leader and founder of the group is Mohammed Fizazi, former imam of the al-Quds Mosque (which was shut down by German authorities in 2010). Fizazi was arrested in 2003 and sentenced to 30 years imprisonment for his radical statements and connection to the Casablanca bombings. Salafia Jihadia has since spawned a wider ideological movement out of Saudi Arabia and the Gulf states.

==== Al-Gama'a al-Islamiyya ====
Al-Gama'a al-Islamiyya, another Salafi-jihadist movement, fought an insurgency against the Egyptian government from 1992 to 1998 during which at least 800 Egyptian policemen and soldiers, jihadists, and civilians were killed. Outside of Egypt, it is best known for a November 1997 attack at the Temple of Hatshepsut in Luxor where fifty-eight foreign tourists trapped inside the temple were hunted down and hacked and shot to death. The group declared a ceasefire in March 1999, although as of 2012, it is still active in jihad against the Ba'athist Syrian regime.

==== Al-Qaeda ====
Jihadist variation of the Black Standard as used by al-Qaeda and its factions since the late 1980s, which consists of the Shahada in white script centered on a black background

Perhaps the most famous and effective Salafi-jihadist group is al-Qaeda. Al-Qaeda evolved from the Maktab al-Khidamat (MAK), or the "Services Office", a Muslim organization founded in 1984 to raise and channel funds and recruit foreign mujahideen for the war against the Soviets in Afghanistan. It was established in Peshawar, Pakistan, by Osama bin Laden and Abdullah Yusuf Azzam.

==== Al-Salafiya al-Jihadiya in the Sinai ====
Al-Salafiya al-Jihadiya in the Sinai was established in 2012 by Muhammad al-Zawahiri, it was created in order to fight Egyptian Security Forces and Israel Defense Forces in the Sinai Peninsula and Gaza Strip.

The group, and many other groups in the Sinai Peninsula, has ties with al-Qaeda, and was one of the many groups who committed terrorist attacks on civilians and Egyptian Armed Forces during many periods of terrorist attacks in the Sinai in 2012 through 2013.

==== Islamic State (IS) ====
In Syria and Iraq, both Jabhat al-Nusra and Islamic State have been described as Salafi-jihadist terrorist organizations. Originating in the Jaish al-Ta'ifa al-Mansurah founded by Abu Omar al-Baghdadi in 2004, the organization (primarily under the Islamic State of Iraq name) affiliated itself with al-Qaeda in Iraq and fought alongside them during the 2003–2006 phase of the Iraqi insurgency. The group later changed their name to Islamic State of Iraq and Levant for about a year, before declaring itself to be a worldwide caliphate, called simply the "Islamic State". They are a transnational Salafi jihadist group and an unrecognised quasi-state. IS gained global prominence in 2014, when their militants conquered large territories in northwestern Iraq and eastern Syria, taking advantage of the ongoing civil war in Syria and the disintegrating local military forces of Iraq. By the end of 2015, their self-declared caliphate ruled an area with a population of about 12 million, where they enforced their extremist interpretation of Islamic law, managed an annual budget exceeding US$1 billion, and commanded more than 30,000 fighters. After a grinding conflict with American, Iraqi, and Kurdish forces, IS lost control of all their Middle Eastern territories by 2019, subsequently reverting to insurgency from remote hideouts while continuing their propaganda efforts. These efforts have garnered a significant following in northern and Sahelian Africa, where IS still controls a significant territory, and the war against the Islamic State continues.

==== Jabhat al-Nusra ====
Jabhat al-Nusra has been described as possessing "a hard-line Salafi-Jihadist ideology" and being one of "the most effective" groups fighting the regime. Writing after ISIS victories in Iraq, Hassan Hassan believes that ISIS is a reflection of "ideological shakeup of Sunni Islam's traditional Salafism" since the Arab Spring, where Salafism, "traditionally inward-looking and loyal to the political establishment", has "steadily, if slowly", been eroded by Salafism-jihadism.

==== Boko Haram ====
Boko Haram in Nigeria is a Salafi-jihadist terrorist organization that has killed tens of thousands of people, displacing 2.3 million from their homes.

==== Jund Ansar-Allah ====
Jund Ansar Allah is, or was, an armed Salafi-jihadist organization based in the Gaza Strip. On August 14, 2009, the group's spiritual leader, Sheikh Abdel Latif Moussa, announced during Friday sermon the establishment of an Islamic emirate in the Palestinian territories attacking the ruling authority, the Islamist group Hamas, for failing to enforce Sharia law. Hamas forces responded to his sermon by surrounding his Ibn Taymiyyah mosque complex and attacking it. In the fighting that ensued, 24 people (including Sheikh Abdel Latif Moussa himself) were killed and over 130 were wounded.

==== Other Salafi jihadist groups ====
According to Mohammed M. Hafez, "as of 2006 the two major groups within the jihadi Salafi camp" in Iraq were the Mujahidin Shura Council and the Ansar al Sunna. There are also a number of small jihadist Salafist groups in Azerbaijan.

The group leading the Islamist insurgency in Southern Thailand in 2006 by carrying out most of the attacks and cross-border operations, BRN-Koordinasi, favours Salafi ideology. It works in a loosely organized strictly clandestine cell system dependent on hard-line religious leaders for direction.

In 2011, Salafist jihadists were actively involved with protests against King Abdullah II of Jordan, and the kidnapping and killing of Italian peace activist Vittorio Arrigoni in the Gaza Strip.

=== Salafi jihadism in Europe ===
==== Sweden ====
In 2017, Swedish Security Police reported that the number of jihadists in Sweden had risen to thousands from about 200 in 2010. Based on social media analysis, an increase was noted in 2013. According to police in Sweden, Salafist-jihadists affect the communities where they are active.

According to Swedish researcher Magnus Ranstorp, Salafi-jihadism is antidemocratic, homophobic and aims to subjugate women and is therefore opposed to a societal order founded on democracy.

==== United Kingdom ====
The report found that Middle Eastern nations are providing financial support to mosques and Islamic educational institutions, which have been linked to the spread of Salafi-jihadist materials which espoused "an illiberal, bigoted" ideology.

==== Germany ====
According to Deutsche Welle, Salafism is a growing movement in Germany whose aim of a caliphate is incompatible with a Western democracy. According to the German Federal Agency for Civic Education, nearly all jihadist terrorists are Salafists, but not all Salafists are terrorists. The dualistic view on "true believers" and "false believers" in practice means people being treated unequally on religious grounds. The call for a religious state in the form of a caliphate means that Salafists reject the rule of law and the sovereignty of the people's rule. The Salafist view on gender and society leads to discrimination and the subjugation of women.

Estimates by German interior intelligence service show that it grew from 3,800 members in 2011 to 7,500 members in 2015. In Germany, most of the recruitment to the movement is done on the Internet and also on the streets, a propaganda drive which mostly attracts youth. There are two ideological camps: one advocates Salafi-Activism and directs its recruitment efforts towards non-Muslims and non-Salafist Muslims to gain influence in society; the other and minority movement, the jihadist Salafism, advocates gaining influence by the use of violence and nearly all identified terrorist cells in Germany came from Salafist circles.

==== France ====
In December 2017, a Salafi-jihadist mosque in Marseille was closed by authorities for preaching about violent jihad. In August 2018, after the European Court of Human Rights approved the decision, French authorities deported the Salafi-jihadist preacher Elhadi Doudi to his home country Algeria because of his radical messages he spread in Marseille.

=== Deobandi jihadism ===
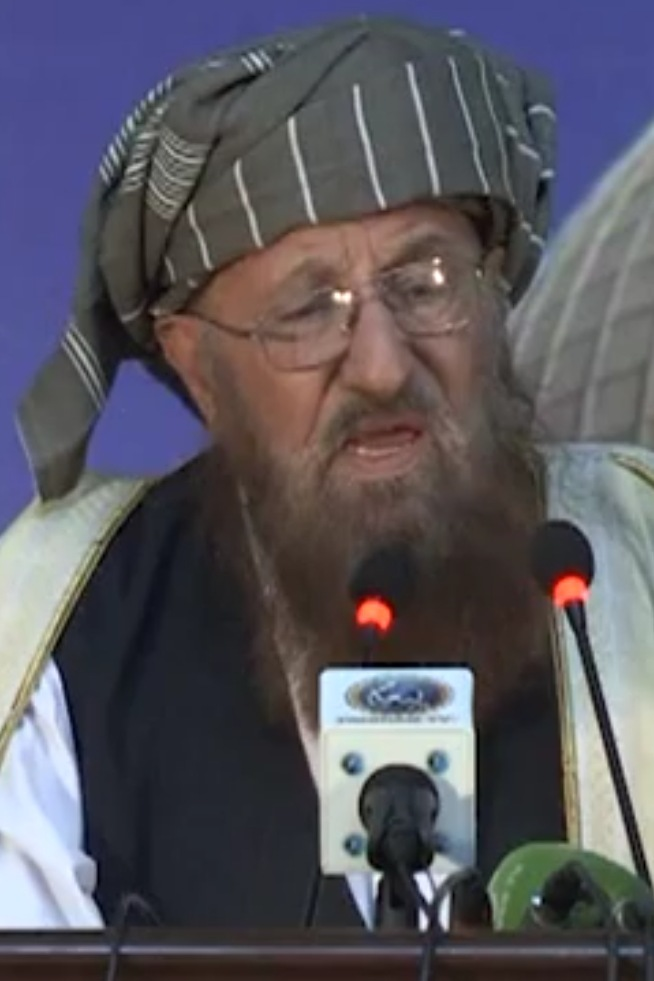
Sami-ul Haq, Deobandi scholar and ideologist of the Taliban

Deobandi jihadism is a militant interpretation of Islam that draws upon the teachings of the Sunni Deobandi movement, which originated in the Indian subcontinent in the 19th century. The Deobandism underwent three waves of armed jihad. The first wave involved the establishment of an Islamic territory centered on Thana Bhawan by the movement's elders during the Indian Rebellion of 1857, before the founding of Darul Uloom Deoband. Imdadullah Muhajir Makki was the Amir al-Mu'minin of this Islamic territory; however, after the British defeated the Deobandi forces in the Battle of Shamli, the territory fell. Following the establishment of Darul Uloom Deoband, Mahmud Hasan Deobandi led the initiation of the second wave. He mobilized an armed resistance against the British through various initiatives, including the formation of the Samratut Tarbiat. When the British uncovered his Silk Letter Movement, they arrested Hasan Deobandi and held him captive in Malta. After his release, he and his disciples entered into mainstream politics and actively participated in the democratic process.

In late 1979, the Pakistan–Afghan border became the center of the Deobandi jihadist movement's third wave, which was fueled by the Soviet–Afghan War. Under the patronage of President Zia-ul-Haq, its expansion took place through various madrasas such as Darul Uloom Haqqania and Jamia Uloom-ul-Islamia. Jamiat Ulema-e-Islam (S) provided political support for it. Trained militants from the Pakistan–Afghan border participated in the Afghan jihad, and later went on to form various organizations, including the Taliban. The most successful example of Deobandi jihadism is the Taliban, who established Islamic rule in Afghanistan. The head of the Jamiat Ulema-e-Islam (S), Sami-ul-Haq, is referred to as the "father of the Taliban". The Deobandi jihadist group Taliban was formed in Afghanistan in the mid-1990s, the founder of the Taliban was Mullah Omar, a former mujahideen fighter who had lost an eye during the war against the Soviet Union. In 1994, he gathered a group of students and religious scholars, many of whom had received their education in Deobandi madrasahs located in Khyber Pakhtunkhwa and Balochistan, and established the Taliban as a political and military movement.

== Shia Islamism ==
According to the Iranian-American academic Vali Nasr, which serves as Majid Khaddouri Professor of International Affairs and Middle East Studies at the Johns Hopkins School of Advanced International Studies (SAIS), political tendencies of Shīʿa and Sunnī Islamic ideologies differ, with Sunnī fundamentalism "in Pakistan and much of the Arab world" being "far from politically revolutionary", primarily focused on attempting to Islamicize the political establishment rather than trying to change it through revolutionary struggle, whereas the Shīʿīte conception of political Islam is strongly influenced by Ruhollah Khomeini and his talk of the oppression of the poor and class war, which characterized the success of the Islamic Revolution in Iran (1978–1979):

With the Shia awakening of Iran, the years of sectarian tolerance were over. What followed was a Sunni-versus-Shia contest for dominance, and it grew intense. [...] The revolution even moved leftists in Muslim-majority countries such as Indonesia, Turkey, and Lebanon to look at Islam with renewed interest. After all, in Iran, Islam had succeeded where leftist ideologies had failed. [...] But admiration for what had happened in Iran did not equal acceptance of Iranian leadership. Indeed, Islamic activists outside of Iran quickly found Iranian revolutionaries to be arrogant, offputting, and drunk on their own success. Moreover, Sunni fundamentalism in Pakistan and much of the Arab world was far from politically revolutionary. It was rooted in conservative religious impulses and the bazaars, mixing mercantile interests with religious values. As the French scholar of contemporary Islam Gilles Kepel puts it, it was less to tear down the existing system than to give it a fresh, thick coat of "Islamic green" paint. Khomeini's fundamentalism, by contrast, was "red"—that is, genuinely revolutionary.

The term "jihadism" is almost exclusively used to describe Sunnī extremist groups. One example is Syria, where there have been thousands of Muslim foreign fighters engaged in the Syrian civil war, for example, non-Syrian Shīʿa Islamist groups are often referred to as "militia", while Sunnī foreign fighters are referred to as "jihadists" (or "would-be jihadists"). (Note: For example: "The battle has drawn Shiite militias from Lebanon, Iraq and Afghanistan on the side of Assad, even as Sunni would-be jihadists from around the world have filled the ranks of the many Islamist groups fighting his rule, including the Islamic State extremist group.") (Note: The Iranian government has drawn from Afghan refugees living in Iran and the number of Afghans fighting in Syria on behalf of the Assad regime has been estimated at "between 10,000 and 12,000".) One who does use the term "Shia jihad" is Danny Postel, who complains that "this Shia jihad is largely left out of the dominant narrative." Other authors see the ideology of "resistance" (muqawama) as more dominant, even among Shīʿa Islamist groups. For clarity, they suggest use of the term muqawamist instead. Houthi rebels have often called for jihad to resist Saudi Arabia's intervention in Yemen, even though the Houthi movement stems from Zaydī Shīʿism, a subsect of Shīʿa Islam which is closer to Sunnī theology in comparison to other Shīʿa denominations.

== Beliefs ==
According to Shadi Hamid and Rashid Dar, jihadism is driven by the idea that jihad is an "individual obligation" (fard ‘ayn) incumbent upon all Muslims. This is in contrast with the belief of Muslims up until now (and by contemporary non-jihadists) that jihad is a "collective obligation" (farḍ al-kifāya) carried out according to orders of legitimate representatives of the Muslim community (Ummah). Jihadists insist that all Muslims should participate because (they believe) today's Muslim leaders in the world are illegitimate and do not command the authority to ordain justified violence.

=== Evolution of jihad ===
The Sarkha, slogan of the Houthi, with the top saying "God is the greatest", the next line saying "Death to America", followed by "Death to Israel", followed by "A curse upon the Jews", and the bottom saying "Victory to Islam"

Some observers have noted the evolution in the rules of jihad—from the original "classical" doctrine to that of 21st-century Salafi jihadism. According to the legal historian Sadarat Kadri, during the last couple of centuries, incremental changes in Islamic legal doctrine (developed by Islamists who otherwise condemn any bid‘ah (innovation) in religion), have "normalized" what was once "unthinkable". "The very idea that Muslims might blow themselves up for God was unheard of before 1983, and it was not until the early 1990s that anyone anywhere had tried to justify killing innocent Muslims who were not on a battlefield."

The first or the "classical" doctrine of jihad which was developed towards the end of the 8th century, emphasized the "jihad of the sword" (jihad bil-saif) rather than the "jihad of the heart", but it contained many legal restrictions which were developed from interpretations of both the Quran and the Hadith, such as detailed rules involving "the initiation, the conduct, the termination" of jihad, the treatment of prisoners, the distribution of booty, etc. Unless there was a sudden attack on the Muslim community, jihad was not a "personal obligation" (fard ‘ayn); instead it was a "collective one" (fard al-kifaya), which had to be discharged "in the way of God" (fi sabil Allah), and it could only be directed by the caliph, "whose discretion over its conduct was all but absolute." (This was designed in part to avoid incidents like the Kharijia's jihad against and killing of Caliph Ali, since they deemed that he was no longer a Muslim). Martyrdom resulting from an attack on the enemy with no concern for one's own safety was considered praiseworthy, but dying by one's own hand (as opposed to the enemy's) merited a special place in Hell. The category of jihad which is considered to be a collective obligation is sometimes simplified as "offensive jihad" in Western texts.

Scholars like Abul Ala Maududi, Abdullah Azzam, Ruhollah Khomeini, leaders of al-Qaeda and others, believe that defensive global jihad is a personal obligation, which means that no caliph or Muslim head of state needs to declare it. Killing oneself in the process of killing the enemy is an act of Shuhada (martyrdom) and it brings one a special place in Heaven, not a special place in Hell; and the killing of Muslim bystanders (nevermind Non-Muslims), should not impede acts of jihad. Military and intelligent analyst Sebastian Gorka described the new interpretation of jihad as the "willful targeting of civilians by a non-state actor through unconventional means." Al-Qaeda's splinter groups and competitors, Jama'at al-Tawhid wal-Jihad and the Islamic State of Iraq and Syria, are thought to have been heavily influenced by a 2004 work on jihad entitled Management of Savagery (Idarat at-Tawahhush), written by Abu Bakr Naji and intended to provide a strategy to create a new Islamic caliphate by first destroying "vital economic and strategic targets" and terrifying the enemy with cruelty to break its will.

Islamic theologian Abu Abdullah al-Muhajir has been identified as one of the key theorists and ideologues behind modern jihadist violence. His theological and legal justifications influenced Abu Musab al-Zarqawi, al-Qaeda member and former leader of al-Qaeda in Iraq, as well as several other jihadi terrorist groups, including ISIL and Boko Haram. Zarqawi used a 579-page manuscript of al-Muhajir's ideas at AQI training camps that were later deployed by ISIL, known in Arabic as Fiqh al-Dima and referred to in English as The Jurisprudence of Jihad or The Jurisprudence of Blood. The book has been described by counterterrorism scholar Orwa Ajjoub as rationalizing and justifying "suicide operations, the mutilation of corpses, beheading, and the killing of children and non-combatants". The Guardian's journalist Mark Towsend, citing Salah al-Ansari of Quilliam, notes: "There is a startling lack of study and concern regarding this abhorrent and dangerous text [The Jurisprudence of Blood] in almost all Western and Arab scholarship". Charlie Winter of The Atlantic describes it as a "theological playbook used to justify the group's abhorrent acts". He states:

Ranging from ruminations on the merits of beheading, torturing, or burning prisoners to thoughts on assassination, siege warfare, and the use of biological weapons, Muhajir's intellectual legacy is a crucial component of the literary corpus of ISIS—and, indeed, whatever comes after it—a way to render practically anything permissible, provided, that is, it can be spun as beneficial to the jihad. [...] According to Muhajir, committing suicide to kill people is not only a theologically sound act, but a commendable one, too, something to be cherished and celebrated regardless of its outcome. [...] neither Zarqawi nor his inheritors have looked back, liberally using Muhajir's work to normalize the use of suicide tactics in the time since, such that they have become the single most important military and terrorist method—defensive or offensive—used by ISIS today. The way that Muhajir theorized it was simple—he offered up a theological fix that allows any who desire it to sidestep the Koranic injunctions against suicide.

Clinical psychologist Chris E. Stout also discusses the al Muhajir-inspired text in his essay, "Terrorism, Political Violence, and Extremism" (2017). He assesses that jihadists regard their actions as being "for the greater good"; that they are in a "weakened in the earth" situation that renders Islamic terrorism a valid means of solution.

== List of conflicts ==
Conflict	Dates	Groups involved	Country/ies	Sources
Soviet–Afghan War	1979-1989	Afghan mujahideen	Afghanistan	
Afghan Civil War (1989–1992)	1989-1992	Afghan mujahideen and Al Qaeda	Afghanistan	
Kashmir conflict	1990–present	Lashkar-e-Taiba	Pakistan	
Somali Civil War	1991–present	Al Shabaab	Somalia	
Algerian Civil War	1991-2002	Armed Islamic Group	Algeria	
Bosnian war	1992-1995	Bosnian mujahideen	Bosnia and Herzegovina	
Afghan Civil War (1992–1996)	1992-1996	Taliban and Al-Qaeda	Afghanistan	
First Chechen War	1994-2017	Mujahideen in Chechnya	Russia	
Afghan Civil War (1996–2001)	1996-2001	Taliban and Al-Qaeda	Afghanistan	
Al-Qaeda insurgency in Yemen	1998–present	Al Qaeda	Yemen	
War in Afghanistan (2001–2021)	2001-2021	Taliban, Al-Qaeda, and Islamic State – Khorasan Province	Afghanistan	
Insurgency in the Maghreb	2002–present	Al Qaeda and Islamic State	Algeria, Mali, Niger, Mauritania, Tunisia, Morocco, and Libya	
Iraqi insurgency	2003–present	Al Qaeda and Islamic State	Iraq	
Insurgency in the North Caucasus	2009-2017	Caucasus Emirate and Islamic State	Russia	
Boko Haram insurgency	2009–present	Boko Haram	Nigeria, Cameroon, Niger, and Chad	
Islamist insurgency in the Sahel	2011–present	Al Qaeda and Islamic State – Sahel Province	Mali, Burkina Faso, Niger, Nigeria, Cameroon, Chad, Benin, Togo, Ghana, and Ivory Coast	
Syrian Civil War	2011-2024	Al Qaeda, Tahrir al-Sham and Islamic State	Syria	
War against the Islamic State	2014–present	Islamic State		
Islamic State–Taliban conflict	2015–present	Taliban and Islamic State	Afghanistan	

== See also ==
- Arab Cold War (1952–1991)
- Arab–Israeli conflict (1948–ongoing)
- Counter-jihad
- Islam and violence
  - Islam and war
  - Holy war in Islam
  - Sectarian violence among Muslims
  - Violence in the Quran
- Islamic extremism
  - Islamic fundamentalism
  - Islamic terrorism
  - Jihadist extremism in the United States
  - Jihadist insurgency in Benin
  - Jihadist flag
  - Mujahideen
  - Qutbism
  - Takfirism
- Islamism
  - Caucasus Emirate (2007–2016), former self-declared proto-state in North Caucasus
  - Chechen Republic of Ichkeria (1991–2000), former unrecognized Islamic state in Soviet Chechnya
  - Haqqani network, militant Islamist organization based in South Asia
  - Islamic Emirate of Afghanistan (1996–2001), former Taliban-ruled Islamic state in Afghanistan
  - Islamic Emirate of Kurdistan (1994–2003), former unrecognized Islamic state in Iraq
  - List of Islamist terrorist attacks
  - Post-Islamism
- Religious fanaticism in Islam
- Salafi movement
  - International propagation of Salafism and Wahhabism (by region)
  - Petro-Islam
  - Salafi jihadism
  - Wahhabism
- Types of jihad

== Literature ==
- Abbas, Tahir (2007). Islamic Political Radicalism: A European Perspective. Edinburgh University Press. ISBN 978-0-7486-2528-4.
- Akbarzadeh, Shahram (2010). Islam and Political Violence: Muslim Diaspora and Radicalism in the West. I B Tauris & Co Ltd. ISBN 978-1-84511-473-2.
- Al-Rasheed, Madawi (2009). Dying for Faith: Religiously Motivated Violence in the Contemporary World. I B Tauris & Co Ltd. ISBN 978-1-84511-687-3.
- Aslan, Reza (2010). Global Jihadism. VDM. ISBN 978-3-639-25006-0.
- Bonner, Michael (2006). Jihad in Islamic History: Doctrines and Practice. Princeton University Press. ISBN 978-1400827381.
- Botobekov, Uran (2021). "How Central Asian Salafi-Jihadi Groups are Exploiting the Covid-19 Pandemic: New Opportunities and Challenges". In Käsehage, Nina (ed.). Religious Fundamentalism in the Age of Pandemic. Religionswissenschaft. Vol. 21. Bielefeld: Transcript Verlag. pp. 107–148. doi:10.14361/9783839454855-005. ISBN 978-3-8376-5485-1.
- Brachman, Jarret (2008). Global jihadism: theory and practice. vol. 10 of Cass series on political violence, Taylor & Francis. ISBN 978-0-415-45241-0.*The Devolution of Jihadism: From Al Qaeda to Wider Movement. Stratfor. 2010. ISBN 978-1-4537-4664-6.
- Brzuszkiewicz, Sarah (2020). "Jihadism and Far-Right Extremism: Shared Attributes With Regard to Violence Spectacularisation". European View. 19 (1): 71–79. doi:10.1177/1781685820915972.
- Coolsaet, Rik (2008). Jihadi Terrorism and the Radicalisation Challenge in Europe. Ashgate. ISBN 978-0-7546-7217-3.
- Hegghammer, Thomas (2010). Jihad in Saudi Arabia: Violence and Pan-Islamism since 1979. Cambridge University Press. ISBN 978-0-521-51858-1.
- Hegghammer, Thomas (2015). ""Classical" and "Global" Jihadism in Saudi Arabia". In Haykel, Bernard; Hegghammer, Thomas; Lacroix, Stéphane (eds.). Saudi Arabia in Transition: Insights on Social, Political, Economic and Religious Change. Cambridge University Press. pp. 207–228. doi:10.1017/CBO9781139047586.014. ISBN 978-1-107-00629-4.
- Käsehage, Nina (2021). "Towards a Covid-Jihad – Millennialism in the field of Jihadism". In Käsehage, Nina (ed.). Religious Fundamentalism in the Age of Pandemic. Religionswissenschaft. Vol. 21. Bielefeld: Transcript Verlag. pp. 81–106. doi:10.14361/9783839454855-004. ISBN 978-3-8376-5485-1.
- Kepel, Gilles (2021) [2000]. Jihad: The Trail of Political Islam. Bloomsbury Revelations (5th ed.). London: Bloomsbury Academic. ISBN 9781350148598. OCLC 1179546717.
- Khosrokhavar, Farhad (2009). Inside Jihadism: Understanding Jihadi Movements Worldwide. Paradigm. ISBN 978-1-59451-616-0.
- Lahoud, Nelly (2010). The Jihadis' Path to Self-destruction. C Hurst & Co Publishers Ltd. ISBN 978-1-84904-062-4.
- Lohlker, Rüdiger, ed. (2013). Jihadism: Online Discourses and Representations. Vienna University Press. ISBN 978-3-8471-0068-3.
- Lohlker, Rüdiger, ed. (2012). New Approaches to the Analysis of Jihadism. Vienna University Press. ISBN 978-3-89971-900-0.
- Pargeter, Alison (2008). The New Frontiers of Jihad: Radical Islam in Europe. I B Tauris & Co Ltd. ISBN 978-1-84511-391-9.
- Pasha, Mustapha Kamal (April 2010). "In the Shadows of Globalization: Civilizational Crisis, the 'Global Modern', and 'Islamic Nihilism'". Globalizations. 7 (1–2). Taylor & Francis: 173–185. Bibcode:2010Glob....7..173P. doi:10.1080/14747731003593463. S2CID 144581998.
- Ranstorp, Magnus (2009). Understanding Violent Radicalisation. Routledge. ISBN 978-0-415-55630-9.
- Rhodes, Darion (2014). Salafist-Takfiri Jihadism: the Ideology of the Caucasus Emirate. International Institute for Counter-Terrorism.
- Sageman, Marc (2008). Leaderless Jihad: Terror Networks in the Twenty-first Century. University of Pennsylvania Press. ISBN 978-0-8122-4065-8.
- Sanchez, James (2007). Who's Who in Al-Qaeda & Jihadi Movements in South and Southeast Asia 19,906 Key Individuals, Organizations, Incidents, and Linkages. Lulu. ISBN 978-1-4303-1473-8.
- Vertigans, Stephen (2007). Militant Islam: A Sociology of Characteristics, Causes and Consequences. Routledge. ISBN 978-0-415-41246-9.
- de Pommereau, Isabelle (2015). "To fight homegrown jihadis, Germany takes lesson from battle with neo-Nazis". The Christian Science Monitor.
