= The War for Muslim Minds =

- Cover to the English-language translation
- Author: Gilles Kepel
- Original title: Fitna: guerre au coeur de l'Islam
- Translator: Pascale Ghazaleh
- Language: French
- Publication place: France
- Media type: Print

The War for Muslim Minds is the English translation of Fitna: guerre au coeur de l'Islam, a 2004 book by French author and Islamic studies scholar Gilles Kepel. It was translated from the original French by Pascale Ghazaleh. The book explores Islam's relationship to the West, especially in the aftermath of the September 11, 2001 attacks. Kepel concludes that most Muslims oppose the attacks on civilians and other militant tactics employed by Islamist extremists and that these actions are hurting them.

In researching this book, Kepel traveled in both the Middle East and the Western world, interviewing leaders across the Islamic world, as well as Western analysts and European diplomats. He asked them about the rising tide and disaffection of Islamist elements in the West. Based on his findings, he argued that the most important battle in the war for Muslim minds over the next decade would be fought in Islamic communities in the West, particularly on the outskirts of major cities such as Paris and London.
