= Gilles Kepel =

French political scientist and Arabist (born 1955)

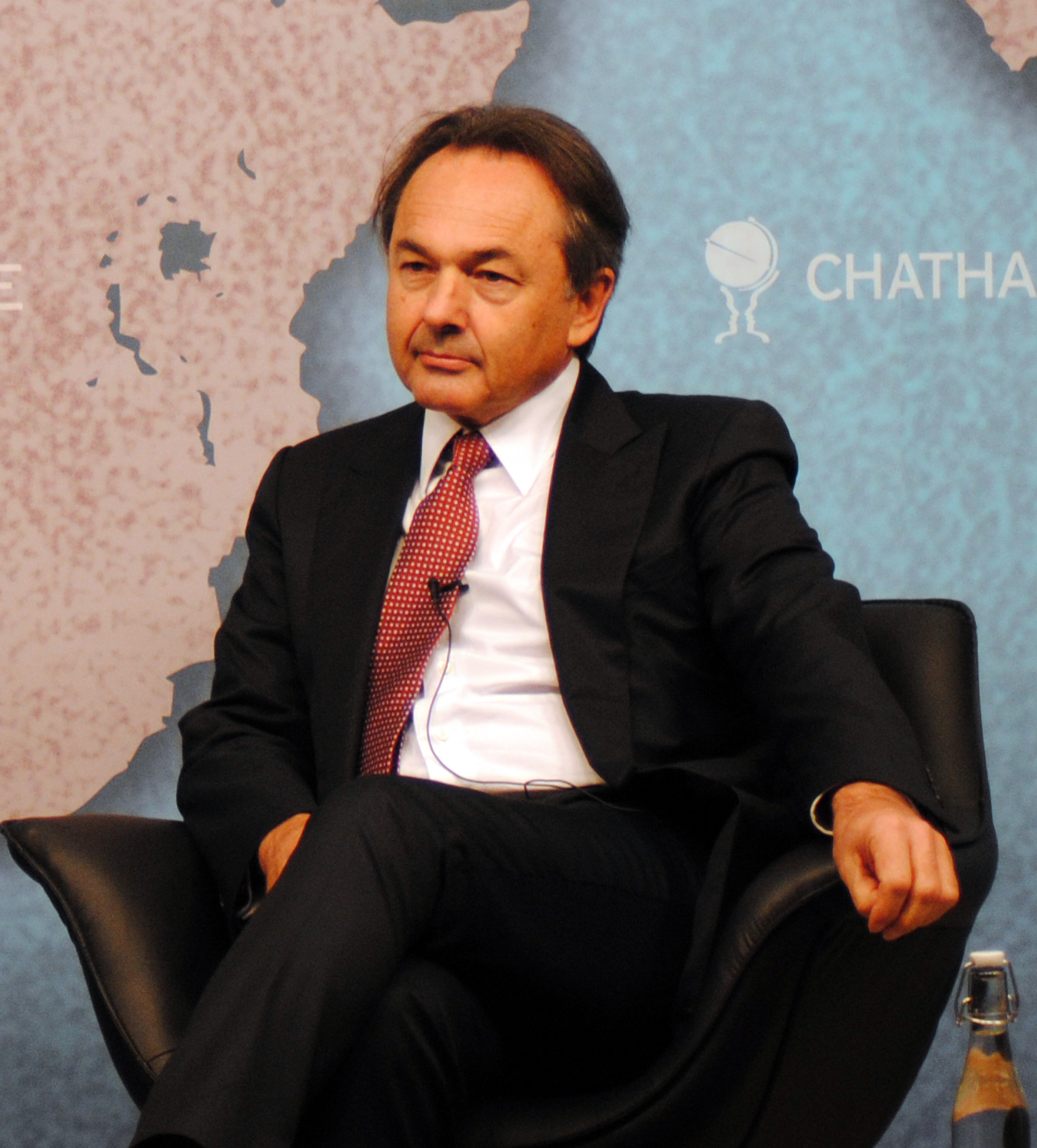
- Gilles Kepel at Chatham House in 2012
- Born: 30 June 1955 (age 71); Paris, France
- Known for: Political Islam and Arab World
- Scientific career
- Fields: Political science, Sociology
- Workplaces: Paris Institute of Political Studies, Institut Universitaire de France, London School of Economics, New York University, Columbia University, CNRS
- Thesis: Le Prophète et le Pharaon (1984)
- Website: gilleskepel.weebly.com

Gilles Kepel (born June 30, 1955) is a French political scientist and Arabist who specialises in the contemporary Middle East and in Muslims in the West. He was a professor at Sciences Po Paris, and Paris Sciences et Lettres University, where he was the director of the Middle East and Mediterranean Program.

His book Away from Chaos: The Middle East and the Challenge to the West (Columbia University Press, 2020) was reviewed by The New York Times as "an excellent primer for anyone wanting to get up to speed on the region."

His essay Le Prophète et la Pandémie / du Moyen-Orient au jihadisme d'atmosphère topped the best-seller lists, and was translated into English as well as several other languages.

== Biography ==
Originally trained as a classicist, he started to study Arabic after a journey to the Levant in 1974. He first graduated in philosophy and English and then completed his Arabic-language studies at the French Institute in Damascus (1977–78). He received his degree in political science from Sciences Po in Paris in 1980. He specialised in contemporary Islamist movements and spent three years at the Centre d'études et de documentation économiques, juridiques et sociales (CEDEJ), where he did the fieldwork for his PhD (defended in 1983) on "Islamist movements in Egypt". It would be translated and published in the United Kingdom in 1985 in English as The Prophet and Pharaoh (US title: Muslim Extremism in Egypt, 1986). The first book in any language to analyze contemporary Islamist militants, it has often been featured on reading lists to this day in universities worldwide.

After he returned to France, where he became a researcher at the French National Centre for Scientific Research (CNRS), he investigated the developments of Islam as a social and political phenomenon there. That led to his Banlieues de l’islam (not translated, literally Islam's Suburbs) in 1987, a book that was primer on studies of Islam in the West. He then turned to the compared study of political-religious movements in Islam, Judaism and Christianity. He published in 1991 The Revenge of God, a best-selling book that was translated into 19 languages.

As a visiting professor at New York University in 1993, he also did fieldwork among black Muslims in the United States. They were later compared with phenomena pertaining to the Rushdie affair in the United Kingdom and the hijab affairs in France and led to his Allah in the West (1996).

He received his habilitation à diriger des recherches (habilitation to be a PhD supervisor) in 1993 from a committee presided by René Rémond, president of Sciences Po, and including Ernest Gellner, Rémy Leveau, Alain Touraine, and André Miquel. He was promoted to research director at CNRS in 1995 and spent the 1995–1996 academic year in the US as New York Consortium Professor (a joint position at Columbia and New York Universities and the New School for Social Research). He used the library facilities at NYU and Columbia to explore the scholarly sources for his best-selling book Jihad: The Trail of Political Islam based on two years of fieldwork in the Muslim World from Indonesia to Africa, which came out in English in 2001 and was translated into a dozen languages. Though the book was hailed for its scope and perspective, it was criticized after 9/11 because it documented the failure of political Islamist mobilization in the late 1990s.

Kepel answered his critics with his travelogue "Bad Moon Rising" in 2002. He then analyzed in retrospect that failure as the end of a first phase of what he would later designate as the "dialectics of Jihadism". It epitomized the struggle against the "nearby enemy", followed by a second phase (Al Qaeda) that learned the lessons of such failure and focused on the "faraway enemy", which in turn failed to mobilize Muslim masses under the banner of Jihadists. It was ultimately followed by a third phase consisting of network-based Jihadi cells in Europe, the Middle East and North Africa, that of ISIS. That Jihad trilogy was further developed in The War for Muslim Minds (2006) and Beyond Terror and Martyrdom (2008). With his students, Kepel also co-edited Al Qaeda in its Own Words (2006), a translation and analysis of chosen texts by Jihadi ideologues Abdallah Azzam, Osama bin Laden, Ayman al-Zawahiri and Abu Musab al-Zarqawi.

In 2001, he was appointed as a tenured professor of political science at Sciences Po, where he created the Middle East and Mediterranean Program, and the EuroGolfe Forum. He supervised more than 40 PhD dissertations, and created the “Proche Orient” series, of which he was the general editor, at Presses Universitaires de France, for his PhD graduates to publish their first book after their dissertation. The series comprised 23 volumes from 2004 to 2017, many of them finding their way into English translations.

In 2008, accused of assaulting Pascal Menoret at the Middle East Studies Association in Washington, after the latter had circulated online slanderous material, Kepel was expelled from the association.

In December 2010, the month of Mohammad Bouazizi's self-immolation at Sidi Bouzid, in Tunisia, which sparked the Arab Spring, Sciences Po closed the Middle East and Mediterranean Program. Kepel was elected a senior fellow at Institut Universitaire de France for five years (2010–2015), which allowed him to refocus on fieldwork. He was also offered the visiting Philippe Roman Professorship in History and International Relations at the London School of Economics in 2009–2010.

In 2012, he published Banlieue de la République, a survey of the 2005 French suburb riots in the Clichy-Montfermeil area, north of Paris, where the events started. The study was based on one-year participant observation on the premises with a team of students, in cooperation with Institut Montaigne think-tank. A sequel, Quatre-vingt treize (or “93” from the postal code of the Seine-Saint-Denis arrondissement, north of Paris) designed a more general perspective on Islam in France, 25 years after Kepel's seminal Les banlieues de l’Islam.

In 2013, he documented the Arab upheavals with the travelogue Passion Arabe, a best-selling book that was awarded the Pétrarque Prize by France Culture radio and Le Monde daily as the best book of the year.

In 2014, Passion française, a survey and travelogue that documented the first generation of candidates to the Parliamentary elections of June 2012 who were from Muslim descent, and focused on Marseille and Roubaix, was the third book in a tetralogy that would culminate with Terror in France: The Rise of Jihad in the West (Princeton UP, 2017; original French 2015) that dealt with the terror attacks by Jihadists in France and put them in perspective.

In 2016, La fracture, based on radio chronicles on France Culture in 2015–16, analyzed the impact of Jihadi terror in the wake of attacks on French and European soil. It puts them in perspective with the rise of extreme-right parties in Europe and questions the very fracture of politics in the Old Continent.

Kepel serves on several advisory boards such as the High Council of the Institut du Monde Arabe in Paris and, since 2016, Kepel is a member of the advisory board of the Berlin-based Middle East think tank Candid Foundation.

In February 2016 he was appointed chairman of the newly founded Program of Excellence on the Mediterranean and the Middle East at Paris Sciences et Lettres University, based at Ecole Normale Supérieure. He is in charge of the monthly seminar on “Violence and Dogma: Territories and representations of contemporary Islam”.

In 2017, Kepel was one of the seven public figures mentioned by Larossi Abballa, the jihadi terrorist who murdered a policeman and his wife in front of their son during the 2016 Magnanville terrorist attack.

Since January 2018, Kepel is a professor at the Paris Sciences et Lettres University.

He is also director of the Middle Eastern Mediterranean Freethinking Platform at the Università della Svizzera italiana in Lugano, Switzerland, where, since September 2018, he is an adjunct professor. The MEM Summer Summit is held every August, gathering young change-makers from the Middle East Mediterranean region.

In October 2018, he published Sortir du Chaos, Les crises en Méditerranée et au Moyen Orient. The book was translated into English by Henry Randolph and published in the United States in 2020 by Columbia University Press as Away from Chaos. The Middle East and the Challenge to the West. It is a sweeping political history of four decades of Middle East conflict and its worldwide ramifications. In the months following the publication, he participated in webinars organized on both sides of the Atlantic and the English Channel, such as the Washington Institute for Near East Policy, Al Monitor, the Center on National Security at Fordham University, Cambridge University... The New York Times recommended the book in its 12 new books weekly selection.

His 2021 essay, "The Prophet and the Pandemic / From the Middle East to Atmospheric Jihadism", released in French in February 2021, topped best-seller lists and is currently being translated into English and a half-dozen languages. An excerpt, "The Murder of Samuel Paty", was printed in the Issue#3 of Liberties Journal (April 27, 2021). In 2024, Plon published Kepel's Holocaustes: Israël, Gaza et la guerre contre l'Occident.

== Ideas and analyses ==
According to Kepel, jihadi terrorism is caused by "the entrenchment of Salafism", a fundamentalist ideology in which most radical elements clash with the values of Western democracies and "are aiming for the destruction of Europe through civil war".

In 2017, Kepel criticized Olivier Roys's assertion that jihadi terrorism is only loosely connected to Islamic fundamentalism as Roy neither speaks Arabic nor looks into the Salafi doctrine behind the jihadism. Kepel also referred to London as "Londonistan": "[the United Kingdom] gave shelter to radical Islamist leaders from around the world as a sort of insurance policy against jihadi terrorism. But you know, when you go for dinner with the devil...". Roy stated, "I have been accused of disregarding the link between terrorist violence and the religious radicalisation of Islam through Salafism, the ultra-conservative interpretation of the faith. I am fully aware of all of these dimensions; I am simply saying that they are inadequate to account for the phenomena we study, because no causal link can be found on the basis of the empirical data we have available". This debate can be summarized as opposition between Kepel's theory of "radicalisation of Islam" and Roy's one of "Islamicisation of radicalism".

To Robert F. Worth, Kepel believes that prominent figures and leaders among the left-leaning intelligentsia do not understand the threats against France, which according to him encompasses both terrorists arriving from abroad and Islamists in the French ghettos (French: banlieues). According to Kepel, Islamists are eroding societal cohesion in order to start a civil war while being unwittingly supported by the many leftists. This position makes him a target in many circles.

Kepel claims that he belongs to the left in France and, according to The New York Times, has "always been careful to distinguish mainstream Islam from the hard-line Islamist ideologues" and has "no sympathy for the xenophobia of the right-wing National Front". He has "repeatedly dismissed claims of widespread Islamophobia in French society as fraudulent, saying the word has become little more than a rhetorical club used by Islamists to rally their base".

== Bibliography ==
Books translated into English

- Muslim Extremism in Egypt: The Prophet and Pharaoh, University of California Press, 1986.
- The Revenge of God: The Resurgence of Islam, Christianity and Judaism in the Modern World, Pennsylvania State University Press, 1994.
- Allah in the West: Islamic Movements in America and Europe, Polity Press, 1997.
- Bad Moon Rising: A Chronicle of the Middle East Today, London, Saqi, 2003.
- Jihad: The Trail of Political Islam, Harvard University Press, 2003.
- The War for Muslim Minds: Islam and the West, Harvard University Press, 2004.
- Al Qaeda in Its Own Words, G. Kepel and J-P Milelli (ed.), Harvard University Press, 2008.
- Beyond Terror and Martyrdom: The Future of the Middle East, Harvard University Press, 2010.
- Terror in France: The Rise of Jihad in the West, Princeton University Press, 2017.
- Away from Chaos. The Middle East and the Challenge to the West, Columbia University Press, 2020.

== See also ==
- Salafi jihadism
