= Jihad: The Trail of Political Islam =

2000 book by Gilles Kepel

- Cover of English translation
- Author: Gilles Kepel
- Original title: Jihad: Expansion et Déclin de l'Islamisme
- Translator: Anthony F. Roberts
- Language: French
- Subject: Islam and politics Jihad; Islam—20th century
- Publisher: Éditions Gallimard (France); Belknap Press (United States)
- Publication date: 2000
- English publication date: 2002
- ISBN: 0-674-00877-4 (English, Belknap Press)

Jihad: The Trail of Political Islam (French: Jihad: Expansion et Déclin de l"Islamisme) is a book by French author and scholar Gilles Kepel. It was originally published in French in 2000 by Gallimard, with English translations by Anthony F. Roberts from Belknap Press in 2002 and I.B. Tauris in 2006.

The book provides a detailed examination of the expansion and decline of what he terms the doomed extremist ideology of the Jihadist movement since the 1960s. The author explains the attraction of Islamism to humiliated and faltering segments of the Muslim population and outlines its severe shortcomings.
