= Fouad Zakariyya =

Egyptian philosopher (1927–2010)

- Born: 1927
- Died: 13 March 2010 (aged 82–83)
- Citizenship: Egypt
- Education: Ain Shams University
- Known for: Existentialism
- Scientific career
- Fields: Philosophy
- Workplaces: Kuwait University

Fouad Zakariyya (or Fuʼād Zakarīyā; 1927 – 13 March 2010) was an Egyptian philosopher, and critic of Islamist thought who is known as "the father of Arab existentialism.”

== Biography ==
Zakariyya was born in 1927. He studied at Ain Shams University in Cairo, and obtained a doctorate in philosophy in 1956. Zakariyya was the head of the philosophy department at Kuwait University from 1974 to 1991.

Zakarriya was a recipient of the Sultan Bin Ali Al Owais Cultural Award for Humanities and Future Studies.

== Books ==
- Myth and Reality in the Contemporary Islamist Movement

== Articles ==
- The Incoherence of Islamic Fundamentalism
