= Islam and democracy =

There exist a number of perspectives on the relationship between the religion of Islam and democracy (the form of government in which political power is vested in the people or the population of a state) among Islamic political theorists and other thinkers, the general Muslim public, and Western authors.

Many Muslim scholars have argued that traditional Islamic notions such as shura (consultation), maslaha (public interest), and ʿadl (justice) justify representative government institutions which are similar to Western democracy, but reflect Islamic rather than Western liberal values. Still others have advanced liberal democratic models of Islamic politics based on pluralism and freedom of thought. Some Muslim thinkers have advocated secularist views of Islam.

A number of different attitudes regarding democracy are also represented among the general Muslim public, with polls indicating that majorities in the Muslim world desire a religious democracy where democratic institutions and values can coexist with the values and principles of Islam, seeing no contradiction between the two.

== Traditional political concepts ==
=== Quran ===
Muslim democrats, including Ahmad Moussalli (professor of political science at the American University of Beirut), argue that concepts in the Quran point towards some form of democracy, or at least away from despotism. These concepts include shura (consultation), ijma (consensus), al-hurriyya (freedom), al-huqquq al-shar'iyya (legitimate rights). For example, shura (Al Imran – Quran 3:159, Ash-Shura – Quran 42:38) may include electing leaders to represent and govern on the community's behalf. Government by the people is not therefore necessarily incompatible with the rule of Islam, whilst it has also been argued that rule by a religious authority is not the same as rule by a representative of God. This viewpoint, however, is disputed by more traditional Muslims. Moussalli argues that despotic Islamic governments have abused the Quranic concepts for their own ends: "For instance, shura, a doctrine that demands the participation of society in running the affairs of its government, became in reality a doctrine that was manipulated by political and religious elites to secure their economic, social and political interests at the expense of other segments of society," (In Progressive Muslims 2003).

=== Sunni Islam ===
Deliberations of the Caliphates, most notably the Rashidun Caliphate, were not democratic in the modern sense rather, decision-making power lay with a council of notable and trusted companions of Muhammad and representatives of different tribes (most of them selected or elected within their tribes).

In the early Islamic Caliphate, the head of state, the Caliph, had a position based on the notion of a successor to Muhammad's political authority, who, according to Sunnis, was ideally elected by the people or their representatives, as was the case for the election of Abu Bakr, Umar ibn Al Khattab, Uthman, and Ali as Caliph. After the Rashidun Caliphs, later Caliphates during the Islamic Golden Age had a much lesser degree of collective participation, but since "no one was superior to anyone else except on the basis of piety and virtue" in Islam, and following the example of Muhammad, later Islamic rulers often held public consultations with the people in their affairs.

The legislative power of the Caliph (or later, the Sultan) was always restricted by the scholarly class, the ulama, a group regarded as the guardians of Islamic law. Since the law came from the legal scholars, this prevented the Caliph from dictating legal results. Sharia rulings were established as authoritative based on the ijma (consensus) of legal scholars, who theoretically acted as representatives of the Ummah (Muslim community). After law colleges (madrasas) became widespread beginning with the 11th and 12th century CE, a student often had to obtain an ijaza-t al-tadris wa-l-ifta ("license to teach and issue legal opinions") in order to issue legal rulings. In many ways, classical Islamic law functioned like a constitutional law.

Bangladeshi Islamic scholar Khandaker Abdullah Jahangir said in a scholarly interview about Islam and democracy that,

Sovereignty means ownership. This is simple that sovereign means owner. For example, I am the owner of this land which is true. I can erect building here, I can demolish it, I can make partition, and I can sell it. I have this ownership. Again, this land belongs to Allah. This is also true. And the fact is, according to Islam, with this land I can do many things, but I cannot make a brothel here. People's ownership is limited; Allah's ownership is the supreme over all other sovereigns. My ownership is worldly, and if I put it over Allah's ownership, I will be offender to Allah. In the same vein, people are the owner of the country, it is a simple word. Those who say it is anti-Islamic to say people are sovereign and they are the source of all powers, I do not agree with them. Here by power, it does not mean power regarding storm-rain, or disease, it means the power of ministers, prime minister and above all state power. This power actually belongs to people. In Islam, power will be attained by the consent of the people. If in a society the chiefs of tribes consent and the mass people agree to it, it is ok, this is democracy. People's participation and share is mandatory in Islam which is democracy. Therefore, people are the owner of the state, and people are the source of power is not contradictory to Islam. However, if anyone thinks this ownership means that anyone can do anything; can make a haram (prohibited) a halal (legitimate), and a halal a haram, then obviously it is anti-Islamic.

==== Salafi view ====
Salafism as an ideology and movement has close ties to Saudi Arabia. The Saudi monarchy from its beginning in the 18th century has partnered with Wahhabism as military tool and ideological support to their monarchical rule. The ruling monarchy uses their scholars (termed salafis, wahhabis, and Najdis) to defend their authoritarian rule and subjugate the masses. Because the Saudi monarchs perceive democracy and the Muslim Brotherhood as a threat to their rule, they have occasionally used extremist Salafi scholars (e.g. madkhalis) to oppose democracy at home and in other Arab states, and claim that democracy is haram and even shirk. For example, after the election of Mohamed Morsi, the Saudi authorities used their Salafi proxies in Egypt to counter the Muslim brotherhood, proclaim that democracy is shirk, and promoted terrorist attacks in the Sinai against the Egyptian military. The violence and destabilization caused by radical Salafi jihadist groups in the Sinai led to the ousting of Morsi and overthrow of democracy in Egypt. Thus, there are different opinions among Salafi scholars regarding democracy depending on the political climate in Saudi Arabia and freedom of expression. Over the decades, different Salafi groups around the world have changed and evolved, from initial quietism to fully embracing political engagement to promote their ideology.

Some Salafi scholars opine that democracy is haram and shirk in Islam and allege that it overrules the Shari'a (e.g. by potentially permitting alcohol and riba if the people vote for it), but they legitimize the opportunity to use democracy to come to power and to vote to establish Islamic rule and encourage voting to choose the better between evils, among these scholars are Shaykh Abd al-Aziz bin Baz, Shaykh Muhammad ibn Uthaymeen, Abdullah al-Ghudayyan, Abdullah Quyud, Abdur Razzaq Afifi, Senior Scholars of Saudi Arabia: Grand Mufti Shaykh Abdul Aziz Ash-Shaikh, Shaykh Abdul Muhsin Al-Abbad, Shaykh Wasiullah Abbas and Saudi Arabia's most senior fatwa panel of scholars, "Permanent Committee for Scholarly Research and Ifta", all echoed similar calls to encourage Muslims to vote.

Khandaker Abdullah Jahangir in his book ("Hadiser Namey Jaliyati") (Forgery in the Name of Hadith) says about the interpretation of Hadith of democratic Islamist parties about Islamic politics,

A variation of lying in the name of hadith is to add or omit something from the translation without doing a literal translation or making the interpretation of what [Muhammad] said a part of the hadith. Almost all of us in our society are involved in this crime. For self-purification, Pir-Muridi, Dawat-Tabligh, politics, etc., we provide evidence from Quran and Hadith to people of every group and opinion. Providing such evidence is a very natural act and demand of faith. But usually we run this explanation in the name of [Muhammad]. For example, [Muhammad] governed the state, but did not do 'party politics' in the traditional sense, i.e. did not do anything like change of power through voting. Currently many scholars are doing democratic 'politics'. It is accepted as a new method of enjoining justice, forbidding injustice or Iqamat Deen. But if we say that, 'Rasulullah (ﷺ) did politics', then the listener or reader will understand the conventional meaning of 'politics', i.e. the seizure of power through voting. And he did not do this politics. As a result, lies will be told in his name. That is why we should tell separately what he did and said and what we are interpreting

Conclusively, Salafi opinions on democracy can be categorized in the following ways, depending on the scholar and the context:

1. That democracy is haram and perhaps even shirk if it is used to overrule fundamental tenets of the Shari'a, like making forbidden things permissible (i.e. making the haram legal), or if it is a threat to the rule of the Saudi monarchy.
2. That participating in democracy outside of Saudi Arabia and the Arab world (e.g. in the West and India) is good (with a variety of opinions on the details) if the participant is voting for the lesser of two evils or for an Islam-promoting candidate.

Fahad bin Salih Al-Ajlan said in his book Muharrar Fi Siyātush Sharīʿah, "The electoral system in Islam is valid, but it is not the conventional democratic system. In this, political candidates must be Muslim and male, voters must also be Muslim and male, women and non-Muslims can participate in the Shura but cannot vote; the term of office of the head of state may be fixed, but it is not obligatory, but permissible." He also said that the ruling on participation in Islamic politics is that if a person, after maintaining his own faith, has the ability to make political reforms as much as he can, then it is encouraged, otherwise participation in it is considered haram. And reforms must be made in matters that already existed, in which there is an opportunity for reform and benefit, but no new haram or bid'ah can be created in the name of benefit; and participation in matters that are completely haram, such as interest, drug production, etc.

=== Shia Islam ===
According to the Shia understanding, Muhammad named as his successor (as leader, with Muhammad being the final prophet), his son-in-law, and cousin Ali. Therefore, the first three of the four elected "Rightly Guided" Caliphs recognized by Sunnis (Ali being the fourth), are considered usurpers, notwithstanding their having been "elected" through some sort of conciliar deliberation (which the Shia do not accept as a representative of the Muslim society of that time). The largest Shia grouping—the Twelvers branch—recognizes a series of Twelve Imams, the last of which (Muhammad al-Mahdi, the Hidden Imam) is still alive and the Shia are waiting for his "reappearance".

== Theoretical perspectives on democracy ==
=== Al-Farabi ===
The early Islamic philosopher, Al-Farabi (c. 872–950), in one of his most notable works Al-Madina al-Fadila, theorized an ideal Islamic state which he compared to Plato's The Republic. Al-Farabi departed from the Platonic view in that he regarded the ideal state to be ruled by the prophet, instead of the philosopher king envisaged by Plato. Al-Farabi argued that the ideal state was the city-state of Medina when it was governed by Muhammad, as its head of state, as he was in direct communion with God whose law was revealed to him. In the absence of the prophet, Al-Farabi considered democracy as the closest to the ideal state, regarding the republican order of the Rashidun Caliphate as an example within early Muslim history. However, he also maintained that it was from democracy that imperfect states emerged, noting how the republican order of the early Islamic Caliphate of the Rashidun caliphs was later replaced by a form of government resembling a monarchy under the Umayyad and Abbasid dynasties.

=== Varieties of modern Islamic theories ===
Muslih and Browers identify three major perspectives on democracy among prominent Muslims thinkers who have sought to develop modern, distinctly Islamic theories of socio-political organization conforming to Islamic values and law:

- The rejectionist Islamic view, elaborated by Sayyid Qutb and Abul A'la Maududi, condemns imitation of foreign ideas, drawing a distinction between Western democracy and the Islamic doctrine of shura (consultation between ruler and ruled). This perspective, which stresses comprehensive implementation of sharia, was widespread in the 1970s and 1980s among various movements seeking to establish an Islamic state, but its popularity has diminished in recent years.
- The moderate Islamic view stresses the concepts of maslaha (public interest), ʿadl (justice), and shura (consultation). Islamic leaders are considered to uphold justice if they promote public interest, as defined through shura. In this view, shura provides the basis for representative government institutions that are similar to Western democracy, but reflect Islamic rather than Western liberal values. Hasan al-Turabi, Rashid al-Ghannushi, and Yusuf al-Qaradawi have advocated different forms of this view.
- The liberal Islamic view is influenced by Muhammad Abduh's emphasis on the role of reason in understanding religion. It stresses democratic principles based on pluralism and freedom of thought. Authors like Fahmi Huwaidi and Tariq al-Bishri have constructed Islamic justifications for full citizenship of non-Muslims in an Islamic state by drawing on early Islamic texts. Others, like Mohammed Arkoun and Nasr Hamid Abu Zayd, have justified pluralism and freedom through non-literalist approaches to textual interpretation. Abdolkarim Soroush has argued for a "religious democracy" based on religious thought that is democratic, tolerant, and just. Islamic liberals argue for the necessity of constant reexamination of religious understanding, which can only be done in a democratic context.

=== Secularist views ===
In the modern history of the Muslim world, the notion of secularism has acquired strong negative connotations due to its association with foreign colonial domination and the removal of religious values from the public sphere. Traditional Islamic theory distinguishes between matters of religion (din) and state (dawla), but insists that political authority and public life must be guided by religious values. Some Islamic reformists like Ali Abdel Raziq and Mahmoud Mohammed Taha have advocated a secular state in the sense of political order that does not impose any single interpretation of sharia on the nation, though they did not advocate secularism in the sense of a morally neutral exercise of state power. The Islamic scholar Abdullahi Ahmed An-Na'im has argued for a secular state built on constitutionalism, human rights and full citizenship, seeking to demonstrate that his vision is more consistent with Islamic history than visions of an Islamic state. Proponents of Islamism (political Islam) reject secularist views that would limit Islam to a matter of personal belief and insist on implementation of Islamic principles in the legal and political spheres. Moreover, the concept of 'Separation of Powers' was propounded by Ruhollah Khomeini.

=== Muhammad Iqbal ===
The modern Islamic philosopher, Muhammad Iqbal, viewed the early Islamic Caliphate as being compatible with democracy. He "welcomed the formation of popularly elected legislative assemblies" in the Muslim world as a "return to the original purity of Islam." He argued that Islam had the "gems of an economic and democratic organization of society", but that this growth was stunted by the monarchist rule of Umayyad Caliphate, which established the Caliphate as a great Islamic empire but led to political Islamic ideals being "repaganized" and the early Muslims losing sight of the "most important potentialities of their faith."

=== Muhammad Asad ===
Another Muslim scholar and thinker, Muhammad Asad, viewed democracy as perfectly compatible with Islam. In his book The Principles of State and Government in Islam, he notes:

Viewed from this historical perspective, 'democracy' as conceived in the modern West is infinitely nearer to the Islamic than to the ancient Greek concept of liberty; for Islam maintains that all human beings are socially equal and must, therefore, be given the same opportunities for development and self-expression. On the other hand, Islam makes it incumbent upon Muslims to subordinate their decisions to the guidance of the Divine Law revealed in the Qur'ãn and exemplified by the Prophet: an obligation which imposes definite limits on the community's right to legislate and denies to the 'will of the people' that attribute of sovereignty which forms so integral a part of the Western concept of democracy.

=== Abul A'la Maududi ===
Islamist writer and politician Abul A'la Maududi, conceived of an "Islamic state" that would eventually "rule the earth". The antithesis of secular Western democracy, it would follow an all-embracing Sharia law. Maududi called the system he outlined a "theo-democracy", which he argued would be different from a theocracy as the term is understood in the Christian West, because it would be run by the entire Muslim community (pious Muslims who followed sharia), rather than ruled by a clerical class in the name of God.

Maududi's vision has been criticized (by Youssef M. Choueiri) as an

ideological state in which legislators do not legislate, citizens only vote to reaffirm the permanent applicability of God's laws, women rarely venture outside their homes lest social discipline be disrupted, and non-Muslims are tolerated as foreign elements required to express their loyalty by means of paying a financial levy.

=== L. Ali Khan ===
Legal scholar L. Ali Khan argues that Islam is fully compatible with democracy. In his book, A Theory of Universal Democracy, Khan provides a critique of liberal democracy and secularism. He presents the concept of "fusion state" in which religion and state are fused. There are no contradictions in God's universe, says Khan. Contradictions represent the limited knowledge that human beings have. According to the Quran and the Sunnah, Muslims are fully capable of preserving spirituality and self-rule.

=== Javed Ahmed Ghamdi ===
Religious scholar, Javed Ahmed Ghamdi interprets the Quranic verses as ''The collective affairs of Muslims are run on the basis of mutual consultations'' (42:37). He is of the view that all the matters of a Muslim state must be sought out through consultations.The parliamentary bodies would provide that platform to practice and implement those consultations.

=== Hassan al-Banna ===
Political theorist and Muslim Brotherhood founder Hassan al-Banna outlined as part of his Islamist political philosophy a degree of support for democracy. He argued in favour of limited multiparty democracy by criticising the party system that existed in Egypt as power seeking and corrupt and instead arguing that political parties within the Muslim world need to remain within the confines of Islam, but that parliamentary democracy could work within this broad framework. In the 1945 Egyptian elections, he became one of the first Muslim Brotherhood candidates to run for elected office.

=== Javed Akbar Ansari ===
Javed Akbar Ansari was a Pakistani Islamic economist and intellectual known for his critique of liberal democracy, capitalism, and secular modernity from an Islamic perspective. In his 2024 Urdu work Jamhuriyat Ki Haqeeqat ("The Reality of Democracy"), he presented democracy as a historically Western political construct rooted in Greek and European intellectual traditions rather than Islamic political theology. The book combines a historical account of democracy with a critique influenced by the thought of Muhammad Iqbal and broader Islamist critiques of liberal modernity. Ansari argued that modern democracy is inseparable from capitalist social relations and secular assumptions about sovereignty, law, and individual freedom. He had also criticized attempts to reconcile Islam with liberal capitalism, including some forms of Islamic finance and "Islamic democracy", which he regarded as accommodations to modern capitalist order rather than authentically Islamic alternatives.

== Views of the general Muslim public ==
Esposito and DeLong-Bas distinguish four attitudes toward Islam and democracy prominent among Muslims today:

- Advocacy of democratic ideas, often accompanied by a belief that they are compatible with Islam, which can play a public role within a democratic system, as exemplified by many protestors who took part in the Arab Spring uprisings;
- Support for democratic procedures such as elections, combined with religious or moral objections toward some aspects of Western democracy seen as incompatible with sharia, as exemplified by Islamic scholars like Yusuf al-Qaradawi;
- Rejection of democracy as a Western import and advocacy of traditional Islamic institutions, such as shura (consultation) and ijma (consensus), as exemplified by supporters of absolute monarchy and radical Islamist movements;
- Belief that democracy requires restricting religion to private life, held by a minority in the Muslim world.

Polls conducted by Gallup and PEW in Muslim-majority countries indicate that most Muslims see no contradiction between democratic values and religious principles, desiring neither a theocracy, nor a secular democracy, but rather a political model where democratic institutions and values can coexist with the values and principles of Islam.

== Islam and democracy in practice ==
=== Obstacles ===
There are several ideas on the relationship between Islam in the Middle East and democracy. Waltz writes that transformations brought by democratization seemed, on the whole, to pass by the Islamic Middle East at a time when such transformations were a central theme in other parts of the world. However, she does note that, of late, the increasing number of elections being held in the region indicates some form of adoption of democratic traditions.

Following the Arab Spring, professor Olivier Roy of the European University Institute, in an article in Foreign Policy, described political Islam as "increasingly interdependent" with democracy, such that "neither can now survive without the other".

Orientalist scholars offer another viewpoint on the relationship between Islam and democratization in the Middle East. They argue that compatibility is simply nonexistent between secular democracy and Arab-Islamic culture in the Middle East, which has a strong history of undemocratic beliefs and authoritarian power structures. Elie Kedourie, a well-known Orientalist scholar, said, for example: "to hold simultaneously ideas which are not easily reconcilable argues, then, a deep confusion in the Arab public mind, at least about the meaning of democracy. The confusion is, however, understandable since the idea of democracy is quite alien to the mind-set of Islam." A view similar to this that understands Islam and democracy to be incompatible because of seemingly irreconcilable differences between Sharia and democratic ideals is also held by some Islamists.

However, within Islam, there are ideals held by some who believe Islam and democracy in some form are indeed compatible due to the existence of the concept of shura ("consultation") in the Quran. Various thinkers and political activists have expressed such views in the Middle East. They continue to be the subject of controversy—e.g., at the second Dubai Debates, which debated the question "Can Arab and Islamic values be reconciled with democracy?"

==== Brian Whitaker's 'four major obstacles' ====
Writing for The Guardian, Brian Whitaker, the paper's Middle East editor, argued that there were four major obstacles to democracy in the region: "the imperial legacy", "oil wealth", "the Arab–Israeli conflict", and "'militant' Islam".

The imperial legacy includes the borders of modern states and significant minorities within them. Acknowledgment of these differences is frequently suppressed, usually for the cause of "national unity" and sometimes to obscure the fact that the minority elite is controlling the country. Whitaker argues that this leads to forming political parties based on ethnic, religious, or regional divisions rather than over policy differences. Voting, therefore, becomes an assertion of one's identity rather than a real choice.

The problem with oil and the wealth it generates is that the states' rulers have the wealth to remain in power, as they can pay off or repress most potential opponents. Whitaker argues that as there is no need for taxation there is less pressure for representation. Furthermore, Western governments require a stable source of oil and are therefore more prone to maintain the status quo rather than push for reforms, which may lead to periods of instability. This can be linked to political economy explanations for the occurrence of authoritarian regimes and lack of democracy in the Middle East, particularly the prevalence of rentier states in the Middle East. A consequence of the lack of taxation that Whitaker talks of in such rentier economies is an inactive civil society. As civil society is considered an integral part of democracy, it raises doubts over the feasibility of democracy developing in the Middle East in such situations.

Whitaker's third point is that the Arab-Israeli conflict serves as a unifying factor for the countries of the Arab League and also serves as an excuse for repression by Middle Eastern governments. For example, in March 2004, Sheikh Mohammad Hussein Fadlallah, Lebanon's leading Shia cleric, is reported as saying, "We have emergency laws, we have control by the security agencies, we have stagnation of opposition parties, we have the appropriation of political rights – all this in the name of the Arab-Israeli conflict." The West, especially the U.S., is also seen as a supporter of Israel, and so it and its institutions, including democracy, are seen by many Muslims as suspect. Khaled Abou El Fadl, a lecturer in Islamic law at the University of California, comments, "modernity, despite its much scientific advancement, reached Muslims packaged in the ugliness of disempowerment and alienation."

This repression by secularist Arab rulers has led to the growth of radical Islamic movement groups, as they believe that the institution of an Islamic theocracy will lead to a more just society. However, these groups tend to be very intolerant of alternative views, including the ideas of democracy. Many Muslims who argue that Islam and democracy are compatible live in the West and are therefore seen as "contaminated" by non-Islamic ideas.

=== Practice ===
- The Green Algeria Alliance was an Islamist coalition of political parties created for the 2012 legislative elections in Algeria. It consisted of the Movement of Society for Peace, Islamic Renaissance Movement (Ennahda), and the Movement for National Reform (Islah). The alliance was led by Bouguerra Soltani of the Movement of Society for Peace. However, the incumbent coalition, consisting of the FLN of President Abdelaziz Bouteflika and the RND of Prime Minister Ahmed Ouyahia, held on to power after winning a majority of seats and the Islamist parties of the Green Algeria Alliance lost seats in legislative election of 2012.
- Shia Islamist Al Wefaq, Salafi Islamist Al Asalah, and Sunni Islamist Al-Menbar Islamic Society are dominant democratic forces in Bahrain.
- During the Bangladesh Liberation War, the Jamaat-e-Islami of Pakistan opposed the independence of Bangladesh. Still, it established itself as an independent political party, the Bangladesh Jamaat-e-Islami, after 1975. The Bangladesh Nationalist Party is the second largest party in the parliament of Bangladesh and the main opposition party. The BNP promotes a center-right philosophy combining elements of conservatism, Islamism, nationalism, and anti-communism. The party believes Islam is an integral part of the sociocultural life of Bangladesh. Since 2000, it has been allied with the Islamic parties Jamaat-e-Islami Bangladesh and Islami Oikya Jote.
- The Party of Democratic Action is the largest political party in Bosnia and Herzegovina. The Party of Democratic Action was founded in May 1990 by reformist Islamist Alija Izetbegović, representing the conservative Bosniaks and other Slavic Muslim population in Bosnia and Herzegovina and the former Yugoslavia.
- In the 2011–12 Egyptian parliamentary election, the political parties identified as "Islamist" and "democratic" (the Muslim Brotherhood's Freedom and Justice Party, Salafist Al-Nour Party and liberal Islamist Al-Wasat Party) won 75% of the total seats. Mohamed Morsi, an Islamist democrat, was the first Islamist president of Egypt, stemming from the Muslim Brotherhood.
- Nahdlatul Ulama and Muhammadiyah are two influential Islamic social movements in Indonesia. United Development Party and the opposition Prosperous Justice Party are major Indonesian Islamist parties active in the country's democratic process.
- The Islamic Action Front (IAF) is Jordan's Islamist political party and the largest democratic political force in the country. The IAF's survival in Jordan is primarily due to its flexibility and less radical approach to politics.
- The Islamic Group is a Sunni Islamist organization and Hezbollah is a Shia Islamist political party in Lebanon.
- The Justice and Construction Party is the Muslim Brotherhood's political arm in Libya and the second largest political force in the country. National Forces Alliance, the largest political group in country, does not believe the government should be run entirely by Sharia law or secular law, but does hold that Sharia should be "the main inspiration for legislation". Former leader Mahmoud Jibril has said the NFA is a moderate Islamic movement that recognises the importance of Islam in political life and favours Sharia as the basis of the law.
- The United Malays National Organisation (UMNO) is the dominant party of Malaysia since that country's independence in 1957. The UMNO sees and defines itself as a moderate Islamist, Islamic democratic, and social conservative party of Muslim Malays. The Pan-Malaysian Islamic Party is a major opposition party and is relatively more conservative and traditionalist than the UMNO.
- The Moroccan Justice and Development Party has been the ruling party in Morocco since November 29, 2011. The Justice and Development Party advocates Islamism and Islamic democracy.
- The Muslim Brotherhood of Syria is a Sunni Islamist force in Syria and loosely affiliated with the Egyptian Muslim Brotherhood. It has also been called the "dominant group" or "dominant force" in the Arab Spring uprising in Syria. The group's stated political positions are moderate. Its April 2012 manifesto "pledges to respect individual rights" and to pluralism and democracy.
- The Islamic Renaissance Party of Tajikistan is Tajikistan's Islamist party and main opposition and democratic force in that country.
- The Ennahda Movement, also known as Renaissance Party or simply Ennahda, is a moderate Islamist political party in Tunisia. On March 1, 2011, after the government of Zine El Abidine Ben Ali collapsed in the wake of the 2011 Tunisian revolution, Tunisia's interim government granted the group permission to form a political party. Since then, it has become Tunisia's biggest and most well-organized party, outdistancing its more secular competitors. In the Tunisian Constituent Assembly election, 2011, the first honest election in the country's history with a turn out of 51.1% of all eligible voters, the party won 37.04% of the popular vote and 89 (41%) of the 217 assembly seats, far more than any other party.

==== Pakistan ====
Early in the history of the state of Pakistan (March 12, 1949), a parliamentary resolution (the Objectives Resolution) was adopted, stating the objectives on which the future constitution of the country was to be based. It contained the basic principles of both Islam and Western Democracy, in accordance with the vision of the founders of the Pakistan Movement (Muhammad Iqbal, Muhammad Ali Jinnah, Liaquat Ali Khan). It proclaimed:

Sovereignty belongs to Allah alone but He has delegated it to the State of Pakistan through its people for being exercised within the limits prescribed by Him as a sacred trust.

- The State shall exercise its powers and authority through the elected representatives of the people.
- The principles of democracy, freedom, equality, tolerance and social justice, as enunciated by Islam, shall be fully observed.
- Muslims shall be enabled to order their lives in the individual and collective spheres in accordance with the teachings of Islam as set out in the Quran and Sunnah.
- Provision shall be made for the religious minorities to freely profess and practice their religions and develop their cultures.

This resolution was included in the 1956 constitution as a preamble and, in 1985, it was inserted into the constitution itself as Article 2 and Schedule item 53 (but with the word "freely" in Provision shall be made for the religious minorities to freely profess and practice their religions and develop their cultures, removed). The resolution was inserted again in the constitution in 2010 with the word "freely" reinstated.

However, Islamisation has proceeded slowly in Pakistan, and Islamists, Islamic parties, and activists have expressed frustration that sharia law has not yet been fully implemented.

==== Indonesia ====
Officially, Indonesia does not have a state religion and is, in many respects, a secular democracy. The constitution of Indonesia gives its people the freedom of worship according to their religion or belief. This is based on the state ideology of "Pancasila" whose first tenet, Ketuhanan yang Maha Esa, translates as "The One and Almighty God", implying that there is a supreme God that unites the nation. It does not specify any religion, though this is also sometimes mistranslated as an endorsement of monotheism. As a result, Indonesians have a religion column in their identity card; however, it is not mandatory (an empty column will indicate irreligion) and is used only for censuses (which are a Dutch colonial legacy). The 5th point of practice of the Butir-butir pengamalan Pancasila states: "Religion and belief in God Almighty are private matters that concern the human relationship with God Almighty." Sukarno's conception of Pancasila is not secular in the Western sense, but he agreed with Mahmud Esad Bay and Mustafa Kemal Atatürk's view that Islam should be free of government control. In his speech entitled "Islam Sontoloyo" ("Foolish Islam"), he was critical of Islamic leaders' misuse of authority to justify wrong actions. According to Yudi Latief, Indonesia's founding leaders, though thoroughly educated and motivated as secularists of the time, were unable to comprehend an Indonesian society without religion. Indonesian nationalist leaders characterized the country as a "religiously neutral state", in which Islam would be separated from the state and that Islamic affairs should be managed by Muslims without the help of the state. A preliminary meeting based on Hatta's initiative agreed that Islamic laws could be used for family laws that are passed by the People's Representative Council, but only if they relate to Muslims, while the 'secular' national criminal code could not to be changed because it applies to all regardless of religion. Sukarno also banned the most popular Islamic party, Masjumi, for alleged involvement in the PRRI rebellion. On January 27, 1953, Sukarno delivered a speech in Amuntai, South Kalimantan, a region with a strong Islamic community. There was a banner reading "Indonesia a Nation State or an Islamic State?" Commenting on the banner, Sukarno said:

The state we want is a nation state consisting of all Indonesia. If we establish a state based on Islam, many areas whose population is not Islamic, such as the Moluccas, Bali, Flores, Timor, the Kai Islands, and Sulawesi, will secede. And West Irian, which has not yet become part of the territory of Indonesia, will not want to be part of the Republic.

Sukarno also disagreed with Aceh adopting Islamic criminal laws as its form of sharia bylaws, stating that "Indonesia is a nation state with the ideology of Pancasila, not a theocratic country with a certain religious orientation" and "Muslim's habit of reading the Quran" is also a form of obedience towards sharia. According to Sukarno, religion is a private matter between individuals and god, that could only be regulated through personal or family matters. During the Suharto era, Islamic parties were even more tightly controlled by the government, through the state formation of the United Development Party. Islamic veils were also banned. Nurcholis Majid, one of the prominent young Islamic thinkers at the time, in his speech "The Need for Reform in Islamic Thinking and the Problem of Ummah Integration", considered Indonesian Muslims to be stuck in ideological dogmatism, and as a result had lost dynamism. He therefore coined the famous slogan: "Islam Yes, Islamic Party No". Most of his colleagues considered this to be an endorsement of secularism. However, Abdurrahman Wahid, the fourth president of Indonesia, explained Indonesia's case as "mild secularism". Neither man considered themselves to be secularist and preferred to use 'secularisation', acknowledging the concern that secularism as an ideology could become a new closed world view functioning like a new religion.

However, in 1970, another political movement centered in students small groups of university students called "liqo" started. It was directly inspired by Hassan al-Banna's Muslim Brotherhood, the proponent of which is Hilmi Aminuddin, which advocates for a gradual change to become more ideal Muslim. This coalesced in the formation of the Indonesian Muslim Students Action Union (KAMMI) in 1998, which alongside Abdurrahman Wahid's Nahdlatul Ulama (NU) and Amien Rais' Muhammadiyah as student leaders formed the groups of student protests against Suharto's government. After the fall of Suharto, KAMMI became the Prosperous Justice Party (PKS), while NU and Muhammadiyah chose not to be involved in practical politics of winning elections and instead formed independent political parties aligned to, but independent of, their Islamic organizations, in the form of the National Awakening Party (PKB) and National Mandate Party (PAN). The democratic reforms led to calls for the adoption of Islamic sharia law in the form of the Jakarta Charter in national legislative body (MPR) in 2002. However, it was rejected, with even the PKB and PAN voting against it.

This was because the two largest Muslim organizations of Indonesia, NU and Muhammadiyah, very much accepted the Pancasila 'secularism' basis of the country. NU and the party closest to it, PKB (Abdurrahman's party), is member of Centrist Democrat International, which also contains the German CDU as well as the Hungarian Fidesz party. Indonesia has a party associated with the Muslim Brotherhood, the PKS, but even it has to commit to the state ideology, which means it is pluralist. Islamic groups that stray from and tried to change Pancasila such as HTI (Indonesian branch of Hizb ut-Tahrir) are banned even though they 'participated' in a democracy.

In a practical sense, in central government levels, Indonesia has six recognized religions, as these are the recognized majority religions of most Indonesians and received state support.

In the Ministry of Religion Affairs, there are separate religious leader administrators for each of the six major religions. Sometimes the president or government members in a formal speech will greet audiences using in all six religious greetings. An example of this was in President Joko Widodo's speech on March 26, 2021. In which he used all religious greetings including:

- "Assalamu'alaikum warahmatullahi wabarakatuh" for Muslims
- "Salam Sejahtera" and "Shaloom" for Christians and Catholics
- "Om Swastyastu" for Hindus
- "Namo Buddhaya" for Buddhists
- "Salam Kebajikan" or "Wei De Dong Tian" (惟德動天) for Kong Hu Cu (Confucians)

Some Indonesian Muslims have long had problems with the implementation of sharia law, seeing it as not necessary and infringing on the non-Muslim population, while others see the implementation of some sharia-based laws as a solution to a failed and corrupt democratic process. In the 1960s, the "Darul Islam" rebellion tried to forcefully form an "Islamic State of Indonesia" although they were eventually defeated. Its regional offshoot based in Aceh advocated for independence, and continued an insurgency for a separate Islamic Aceh country. As a result of the Boxing Day tsunami in 2004 and negotiations facilitated by the Swedish government (Hasan di Tiro had a Swedish passport and lived there in exile) as well as the Finnish government, the Helsinki MoU was signed ending the conflict. Indonesia would allow Aceh to adopt its own version of law called Qanun, and Aceh would stop fighting for independence and adopt the special autonomy law.

==== Iran ====
===== Theory =====
Since the revolution in Iran, the largest Shia country, Twelver Shia political thought has been dominated by that of Ayatollah Ruhollah Khomeini, the founder and leader of the revolution. Khomeini argued that in the absence of the Hidden Imam and other divinely-appointed figures (in whom ultimate political authority rests), Muslims have not only the right, but also the obligation to establish an "Islamic state". To that end they must turn to scholars of Islamic law (fiqh) who are qualified to interpret the Quran and the writings of the imams.

Once in power and recognizing the need for more flexibility, Khomeini modified some earlier positions, insisted the ruling jurist need not be one of the most learned, that Sharia rule was subordinate to interests of Islam (Maslaha—"expedient interests" or "public welfare"), and the "divine government" as interpreted by the ruling jurists, who could overrule Sharia if necessary to serve those interests. The Islamic "government, which is a branch of the absolute governance of the Prophet of God, is among the primary ordinances of Islam, and has precedence over all 'secondary' ordinances."

The last point was made in December 1987, when Khomieni issued a fatwa in support of the Islamic government's attempt to pass a labor protection bill not in accordance with sharia. He ruled that in the Islamic state, governmental ordinances were primary ordinances, and that the Islamic state has absolute right (Persian: ولايت مطلقه) to enact state commandments, taking precedence over "all secondary ordinances such as prayer, fasting, and pilgrimage".

Were the powers of government to lie only within the framework of secondary divine decrees, the designation of the divine government and absolute deputed guardianship (wilayat-i mutlaqa-yi mufawwada) to the Prophet of Islam (peace be upon him and his progeny) would have been in practice entirely without meaning and content. ... I must point out, the government which is a branch of the absolute governance of the Prophet of God is among the primary ordinances of Islam, and has precedence over all secondary ordinances such as prayer (salat), fasting (sawm), and pilgrimage (hajj).

The idea and concept of Islamic democracy has been accepted by many Iranian clerics, scholars and intellectuals. The most notable of those who have accepted the theory of Islamic democracy is probably Iran's Leader, Ayatollah Ali Khamenei, who mentions Islamic democracy as "Mardomsalarie Dini" in his speeches. Nevertheless, Khamenei openly expresses his opposition to liberal democracy, having said, "Islam naturally stands against liberal democracy."

There are also other Iranian scholars who oppose or at least criticise the concept of Islamic democracy. Among the most popular of them are Ayatollah Naser Makarem Shirazi who have written: "If not referring to the people votes would result in accusations of tyranny then it is allowed to accept people vote as a secondary commandment." Also Mohammad-Taqi Mesbah-Yazdi has more or less the same viewpoint.

===== Practice =====
Some Iranians, including Mohammad Khatami, categorize the Islamic Republic of Iran as a kind of religious democracy. They maintain that Ruhollah Khomeini held the same view as well and that's why he strongly chose "Jomhoorie Eslami" (Islamic Republic) over "Hokoomate Eslami" (Islamic State).

Others maintain that not only is the Islamic Republic of Iran undemocratic (see Politics of Iran) but that Khomeini himself opposed the principle of democracy in his book Hokumat-e Islami: Wilayat al-Faqih, where he denied the need for any legislative body saying, "no one has the right to legislate ... except ... the Divine Legislator", and during the Islamic Revolution, when he told Iranians, "Do not use this term, 'democratic.' That is the Western style." Although it is in contrast with his commandment to Mehdi Bazargan. It is a subject of lively debate among pro-Islamic Iranian intelligentsia. Also they maintain that Iran's sharia courts, the Islamic Revolutionary Court, blasphemy laws of the Islamic Republic of Iran, and the Islamic religious police violate the principles of democratic governance. However, it should be understood that when a democracy is accepted to be Islamic by people, the law of Islam becomes the democratically ratified law of that country. Iranians have ratified the constitution in which the principle rules are explicitly mentioned as the rules of Islam to which other rules should conform. Khomeini fervently believed that principles of democracy cannot provide the targeted justice of Islam in the Sharia and Islamic thoughts.(Mohaghegh. Behnam 2014) This contrast of view between the two Iranian head leaders of this Islamic country, as above mentioned about Khatami's and Khomeini's views have provisionally been being a case of disaffiliation of nearly half a country in most probable political coincidence, so the people cognizant of this heterogeneous political belief shall not be affiliated by newly formed views of democratic principles.(Mohaghegh, Behnam 2014)

A number of deviations from traditional sharia regulations have been noted in Iran

... the financial system has barely been Islamized; Christians, for example, are not subject to a poll tax and pay according to the common scheme. Insurance is maintained (even though chance, the very basis for insurance should theoretically be excluded from all contracts). The contracts signed with foreigners all accept the matter of interest.

== Indices of democracy in Muslim countries ==
There are several non-governmental organizations that publish and maintain indices of democracy in the world, according to their own various definitions of the term, and rank countries as being free, partly free, or unfree using various measures of freedom, including political rights, economic rights, freedom of the press and civil liberties.

The following lists Muslim-majority countries and shows the scores given by two frequently used indices: 2022 Democracy Index (The Economist) and 2023 V-Dem Democracy indices for electoral democracy. These indices are frequently used in Western media, but have attracted some criticism and may not reflect recent changes.

| Location | Democracy Index Score | Democracy Index Rank | Democracy Index Category | V-Dem electoral democracy index | Type of government | Religion and State |
|---|---|---|---|---|---|---|
| Afghanistan | 0.32 | 167 | Authoritarian regime | 0.082 | Unitary provisional theocratic Islamic emirate | Islamic state |
| Albania | 6.41 | 64 | Flawed democracy | 0.484 | Parliamentary system | Secular state |
| Algeria | 3.66 | 113 | Authoritarian regime | 0.281 | Unitary parliamentary constitutional republic | State religion |
| Azerbaijan | 2.87 | 134 | Authoritarian regime | 0.188 | Presidential system | Secular state |
| Bahrain | 2.52 | 141 | Authoritarian regime | 0.122 | Constitutional monarchy | State religion |
| Bangladesh | 5.99 | 73 | Hybrid regime | 0.274 | Parliamentary republic | State religion |
| Bosnia and Herzegovina | 5.00 | 97 | Hybrid regime | 0.528 | Parliamentary republic | Secular state |
| Brunei | – | – | Authoritarian regime | - | Absolute monarchy | Islamic state |
| Burkina Faso | 3.08 | 127 | Authoritarian regime | 0.295 | Semi-presidential system | Secular state |
| Chad | 1.67 | 160 | Authoritarian regime | 0.14 | Presidential system | Secular state |
| Comoros | 3.20 | 120 | Authoritarian regime | 0.284 | Presidential system, Federal republic | Islamic state (de jure); Secular state (de facto) |
| Djibouti | 2.74 | 137 | Authoritarian regime | 0.255 | Semi-presidential system | State religion |
| Egypt | 2.93 | 131 | Authoritarian regime | 0.175 | Unitary semi-presidential constitutional republic | State religion |
| Gambia | 4.47 | 102 | Hybrid regime | 0.62 | Presidential system | Secular state |
| Guinea | 2.32 | 145 | Authoritarian regime | 0.191 | Presidential system | Secular state |
| Guinea-Bissau | 2.56 | 140 | Authoritarian regime | 0.371 | Semi-presidential system | Secular state |
| Indonesia | 6.71 | 54 | Flawed democracy | 0.574 | Presidential system | Secular state |
| Iran | 1.96 | 154 | Authoritarian regime | 0.182 | Unitary theocratic presidential Islamic Republic | Islamic state |
| Iraq | 3.13 | 124 | Authoritarian regime | 0.362 | Parliamentary republic | State religion |
| Ivory Coast | 4.22 | 106 | Hybrid regime | 0.437 | Presidential system | Secular state |
| Jordan | 3.17 | 122 | Authoritarian regime | 0.259 | Constitutional monarchy | State religion |
| Kazakhstan | 3.08 | 127 | Authoritarian regime | 0.277 | Presidential system | Secular state |
| Kosovo | - | – | – | 0.618 | | Secular state |
| Kuwait | 3.83 | 111 | Authoritarian regime | 0.317 | Constitutional monarchy | State religion |
| Kyrgyzstan | 3.62 | 116 | Authoritarian regime | 0.382 | Parliamentary republic | Secular state |
| Lebanon | 3.64 | 115 | Hybrid regime | 0.426 | Confessionalist Parliamentary republic | Secular state |
| Libya | 2.06 | 151 | Authoritarian regime | 0.213 | Provisional government | State religion |
| Malaysia | 7.30 | 40 | Flawed democracy | 0.438 | Constitutional monarchy, parliamentary democracy | State religion |
| Maldives | – | – | – | 0.583 | | State religion |
| Mali | 3.23 | 119 | Authoritarian regime | 0.235 | Semi-presidential system | Secular state |
| Mauritania | 4.03 | 108 | Hybrid regime | 0.395 | Islamic republic, Semi-presidential system | Islamic state |
| Morocco | 5.04 | 95 | Hybrid regime | 0.264 | Constitutional monarchy | State religion |
| Niger | 3.73 | 112 | Authoritarian regime | 0.511 | Semi-presidential system | Secular state |
| Nigeria | 4.23 | 105 | Hybrid regime | 0.49 | Federalism, presidential system | Secular state, Islamic state (only in the northern Nigerian states) |
| Oman | 3.12 | 125 | Authoritarian regime | 0.17 | Absolute monarchy | Islamic state |
| Pakistan | 4.13 | 107 | Hybrid regime | 0.388 | Islamic Republic, Federalism, parliamentary republic | Islamic state |
| State of Palestine | 3.86 | 110 | Authoritarian regime | 0.26 | Semi-presidential system | State religion |
| Qatar | 3.65 | 114 | Authoritarian regime | 0.088 | Semi-constitutional monarchy | State religion |
| Saudi Arabia | 2.08 | 150 | Authoritarian regime | 0.016 | Islamic absolute monarchy | Islamic state |
| Senegal | 5.72 | 79 | Hybrid regime | 0.69 | Semi-presidential system | Secular state |
| Sierra Leone | 5.03 | 96 | Hybrid regime | 0.559 | Presidential system | Secular state |
| Somalia | | | | 0.162 | Federalism, Semi-presidential system | State religion |
| ‡ Somaliland (Somalia) | | | | 0.421 | | State religion |
| Sudan | 2.47 | 144 | Authoritarian regime | 0.169 | Federalism, presidential system | Secular state (de jure); Islamic state (de facto) |
| Syria | - | - | Caretaker government | - | transitioning | Secular state |
| Tajikistan | 1.94 | 156 | Authoritarian regime | 0.175 | Presidential system | Secular state |
| Tunisia | 5.51 | 85 | Hybrid regime | 0.307 | Semi-presidential system | Secular state |
| Turkey | 4.35 | 103 | Hybrid regime | 0.276 | Presidential system | Secular state |
| Turkmenistan | 1.66 | 161 | Authoritarian regime | 0.149 | Presidential system, one-party state | Secular state |
| United Arab Emirates | 2.90 | 133 | Authoritarian regime | 0.101 | Federalism, Constitutional monarchy | State religion |
| Uzbekistan | 2.12 | 149 | Authoritarian regime | 0.221 | Presidential system | Secular state |
| ‡Western Sahara (controlled by Morocco) | – | – | – | - | | State religion |
| Yemen | 1.95 | 155 | Authoritarian regime | 0.123 | Provisional government | Islamic state |

Key: ‡ – Disputed territory (according to Freedom House)

== Islamic democratic parties and organizations ==
This is a list of parties which aim for the implementation of Sharia or an Islamic State, or subscribe to Muslim identity politics, or in some other way fulfil the definitions of political Islam, activist Islam, or Islamism laid out in this article; or have been widely described as such by others.

| Country or scope | Movement/s |
|---|---|
| Bangladesh | Bangladesh Jamaat-e-Islami; Islami Andolan Bangladesh |
| Bosnia and Herzegovina | Party of Democratic Action |
| Egypt | Freedom and Justice Party (banned); Muslim Brotherhood in Egypt (banned); Al-Nour Party; Al-Wasat Party |
| India | Indian Union Muslim League; Hurriyat Conference; AIUDF; AIMIM; Indian National Congress |
| Indonesia | National Awakening Party; Prosperous Justice Party |
| Iran | Alliance of Builders of Islamic Iran; Islamic Iran Participation Front; People's Mojahedin of Iran (exiled) |
| Iraq | State of Law Coalition (Shia); National Iraqi Alliance (Shia) |
| Jordan | Islamic Action Front |
| Kuwait | Hadas |
| Lebanon | Hezbollah; Al-Ahbash; Islamic Group |
| Libya | Justice and Construction Party; Homeland Party; National Forces Alliance |
| Malaysia | Pan-Malaysian Islamic Party; United Malays National Organisation; Malaysian United Indigenous Party; National Trust Party (Malaysia) |
| Maldives | Islamic Democratic Party; Adhaalath Party |
| Morocco | Justice and Development Party |
| Pakistan | Tehreek-e-Insaf; Majlis Wahdat-e-Muslimeen; Jamaat-e-Islami; Istehkam-e-Pakistan; Muslim League (Jinnah); People's Party; Jamiat Ulema-e-Islam (Fazl) |
| Philippines | Lakas–CMD; United Bangsamoro Justice Party |
| Rwanda | Islamic Democratic Party |
| Sudan | National Umma Party Sudan |
| Somalia | Peace and Development Party |
| Syria | Muslim Brotherhood of Syria |
| Turkey | Felicity Party; Free Cause Party; Justice and Development Party (AKP); Future Party |
| Yemen | Al-Islah |

== See also ==
- Institute on Religion and Democracy
- Censorship in Islamic societies
- Dialogue Among Civilizations
- The Clash of Civilizations
- Freedom deficit
- Islamic ethics
- Islamic revival
- Islamism
- Islam Yes, Islamic Party No
- Ahl al-hall wal-aqd
- Organisation of Islamic Cooperation
- Persecution of minority Muslim groups
- Glossary of Islam
- Outline of Islam
- Index of Islam-related articles

== Bibliography ==
- Mahmoud Sadri and Ahmad Sadri (eds.) 2002 Reason, Freedom, and Democracy in Islam: Essential Writings of Abdolkarim Soroush, Oxford University Press
- Omid Safi (ed.) 2003 Progressive Muslims: On Justice, Gender and Pluralism, Oneworld
- Azzam S. Tamimi 2001 Rachid Ghannouchi: A Democrat within Islamism, Oxford University Press
- Khan L. Ali 2003 A Theory of Universal Democracy, Martinus Nijhoff Publishers
- Khatab, Sayed & G. Bouma, Democracy in Islam, Routledge 2007
