= Muhammad al-Munajjid =

Syrian-born Palestinian-Saudi Islamic scholar (born 1960)

Muhammad Salih al-Munajjid

Personal life
- Born: 14 June 1961 (age 65)
- Era: Modern era
- Notable work(s): Founder and supervisor of IslamQA.info fatwa website, ZAD Academy (diploma in Islamic courses)

Religious life
- Religion: Islam
- Denomination: Sunni
- Creed: Athari
- Movement: Salafism

Muslim leader
- Influenced by: Ibn Taymiyya, Muhammad ibn Abd al-Wahhab, Ibn Baz, Ibn Uthaymin, Ibn Jibrin, Abdul-Rahman al-Barrak, Saleh al-Fawzan
- Influenced: Assim al-Hakeem

Muḥammad Ṣāliḥ al-Munajjid (Arabic: محمد صالح المنجد; born 14 June 1961/30 Dhu'l-Hijja 1380 AH) is a Syrian-born Palestinian-Saudi Islamic scholar. He is the founder of the fatwa website IslamQA, the most popular website for responses on the topic of Islam.

== Early life and education ==
Al-Munajjid was born to a family of Palestinian refugees in Aleppo, Syria and raised in Saudi Arabia. He studied shariah (Islamic law) under 'Abd al-'Aziz ibn Baaz, Muhammad ibn al-Uthaymin, Abdullah ibn Jibreen and Abdul-Rahman al-Barrak, among others.

== IslamQA.info ==
In 1996, al-Munajjid launched a question and answer Islamic website, IslamQA.info. The website states, "All questions and answers on this site have been prepared, approved, revised, edited, amended or annotated by Shaykh Muhammad Saalih al-Munajjid, the supervisor of this site." IslamQA.info was banned in Saudi Arabia for issuing independent fatwas. In Saudi Arabia the kingdom's Council of Senior Scholars has sole responsibility and authority for issuing fatwas under a royal edict issued in August 2010 (while restrictions had been in place since 2005, they were seldom enforced); this move was described by Christopher Boucek as "the latest example of how the state is working to assert its primacy over the country's religious establishment."

== Views ==
=== Kalam ===
Al-Munajjid believes that the Muʿtazila, Ashʿari, and Maturidi schools of Islamic theology are wrong in using ilm al-Kalam (philosophy) to explain the Quran and are contradicting both the Quran and the Sunnah. Attributes that God ascribes to himself require neither explanation nor interpretation; instead, a Muslim should neither deny the divine attributes nor liken God to his creation and should accept the statements of God in the Quran without questioning.

=== Idols ===
Al-Munajjid quoted Ibn Ḥajar saying it is obligatory to destroy anything that may tempt or confuse the faithful, including buildings, people, animals, or inanimate objects.

=== Women ===
Al-Munajjid has stated that Muslim women are obliged to cover their entire body including the face (except eyes) and hands. He also stated that women are required to stay within their city of residence, unless they are in the company of a mahram and are forbidden to ride in a taxi/car driven by a non-mahram male, as "it may lead to evil consequences".

=== Slavery ===
Al-Munajjid does not denounce (war captive) slavery, and, in a January 2016 fatwa, stated that a man was allowed to have consensual intercourse with his concubine whether he is married or not, and that his wife "has no right to object to her husband owning female slaves or to his having intercourse with them ", he continues, "The scholars are unanimous in this assessment, and no one is permitted to view this act as forbidden, or to forbid it. Whoever does so, is a sinner, and is acting against the consensus of the scholars.” However, he did state that Islam does condemn ill treatment of slaves.

Al-Munajjid has stated that slavery necessarily came about because of jihad against the kuffar (disbelievers) and the need to determine what to do with those who have been taken prisoner and thus become property, noting that "In principle, slavery is not something that is desirable" as Islam encourages the freeing of slaves for the expiation of sins. Slaves are to be treated in a "kind manner" including the provision of food and clothing from ones own. It's important to know that this is the Orthodox Islamic view.

=== Homosexuality ===
Al-Munajjid stated that "The crime of homosexuality is one of the greatest crimes, the worst of sins and the most abhorrent of deeds, and Allah punished those who did it in a way that he did not punish other nations." He has openly called for the death penalty for proven acts of sodomy (homosexual intercourse) in Muslim lands, with works distributed in his name saying that "those guilty of this crime are to be killed by the sword". This is also the Orthodox interpretation of Sharia (Islamic law).

== Arrest ==
Saudi authorities arrested preacher Muhammad al-Munajjid on 18 September 2017 as part of a campaign of arrests that also included other preachers.

== Books ==
Al-Munajjid's books include:

- Koonu ‘ala al-Khayr A‘waanan (Be Helpers in Doing Good)
- Arba‘oona Naseehah li Islaah al-Buyoot (The Muslim Home: 40 Recommendations)
- 33 Sababan li’l-Khushoo‘ (33 Ways of Developing Khushoo‘ in Salaah)
- Al-Asaaleeb an-Nabawiyyah fi ‘Ilaaj al-Akhtaa’ (The Prophet's Methods for Correcting People's Mistakes)
- Saba‘oona Mas’alah fi’s-Siyaam (70 Matters related to Fasting)
- ‘Ilaaj al-Humoom (Dealing with Worries and Stress)
- Al-Manhiyaat ash-Shar‘iyyah (Disallowed Matters)
- Muharramaat istahaana biha Katheer min an-Naas (Prohibitions that are Taken Too Lightly)
- Madha taf‘alu fi’l-Haalaat at-Taaliyah (What you should do in the following situations)
- Zaahirat Da‘f al-Eemaan (Weakness of Faith)
- Wasaa’il ath-Thibaat ‘ala Deen-Illah (Means of Steadfastness: Standing Firm in Islam)
- Ureedu an Atooba Walaakin… (I Want to Repent, But…)
- Shakaawa wa Hulool (Problems and Solutions)
- Siraa‘ ma‘a ash-Shahawaat (Striving against Whims and Desires)

== External sources ==
- Official website (almunajjid.com)
- https://twitter.com/almonajjid
- https://twitter.com/almonajjid_EN
