= Khandaker Abdullah Jahangir =

Bangladeshi Islamic Scholar

Khandaker Abdullah Jahangir Mumtaz al-Muhadditheen
- খোন্দকার আব্দুল্লাহ জাহাঙ্গীর

Personal life
- Born: 1 February 1958 Gobindpur-Dhopaghat, Jhenaidah, Jessore District, East Pakistan
- Died: 11 May 2016 (aged 55) Dhaka-Khulna Highway, Magura, Bangladesh
- Spouse: Fatima Abul Ansar
- Children: 3 daughters and 1 son
- Notable work(s): Rāhē Belaẏat, Iḥyā as-Sunan, Islāmer Name Jaṅgibād
- Education: Jhenaidah Siddiqia Kamil Madrasah; Dhaka Alia Madrasa; Imam Mohammad Ibn Saud Islamic University
- Known for: Dawah, Professor of Islamic University, Bangladesh
- Website: assunnahtrust.org

Religious life
- Religion: Islam
- Denomination: Sunni
- Creed: Athari

Muslim leader
- Teacher: Ubaidul Haq; Muhammad Abdur Rahim; Abd al-Aziz Ibn Baz; Muhammad ibn al-Uthaymeen; Abdullah Ibn Jibreen; Saleh Al-Fawzan
- Influenced: Sheikh Ahmadullah, Abubakar Muhammad Zakaria
Khandaker Abdullah Jahangir
YouTube information
- Channel: Dr. Khandaker Abdullah Jahangir Rh Official
- Years active: 2011–present
- Subscribers: 805K
- Views: 73.25M
- Last updated: August 2026

Khandaker Abu Nasr Muhammad Abdullah Jahangir (Arabic: أبو نصر محمد عبد الله جهانغير بن خوندكار أنور الزمان, Bengali: খোন্দকার আবু নসর মুহাম্মদ আব্দুল্লাহ জাহাঙ্গীর; (1 February 1958 – 11 May 2016), or Abdullah Jahangir, was a Bangladeshi Islamic scholar, professor, television presenter and author. He participated in public lectures across Bangladesh and during his time as Professor of Al-Hadith in Islamic Studies at the Islamic University, Bangladesh, 12 of his students received PhD and 30 achieved MPhi. He has authored many Islamic books which have received great acclaim in the South East Asian Region.

== Early life and family ==
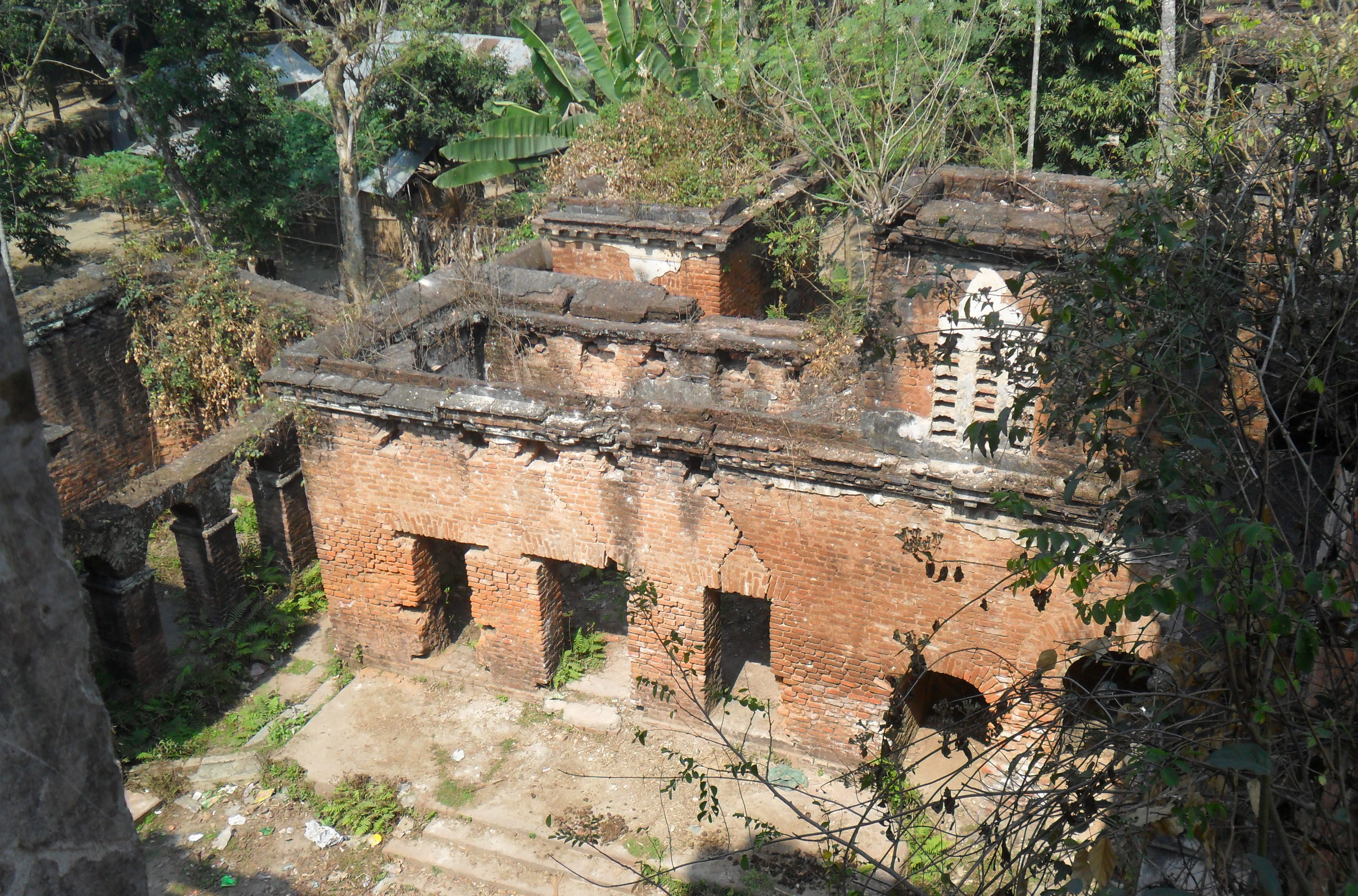
Jahangir spent much of his youth at the Miyar Dalan, a zamindar palace in Muraridaha, Jhenaidah town.

Jahangir was born on 5 November 1958 in the Narharidra village in Shailkupa, Jhenaidah subdivision, which was then located in the Jessore District of East Pakistan. He belonged to a Bengali Muslim family of "Khandakars." His father's name was Khandaker Anwaruzzaman and his mother's name was Begum Lutfunnahar. During his early years his father relocated with his family to the village of Dhopaghata-Gobindpur.

Jahangir was married to Fatima, daughter of Pir Abdul Kahhar Siddiqui of Furfura Sharif. They had one son (Khandaker Usama Jahangir) and three daughters (Zakia Khandaker, Rifat Khandaker and Busaina Khandaker).

== Education ==
Abdullah Jahangir studied at the Bhutiargati Government Primary School in Jhenaidah, and then joined the Jhenaidah Siddiqia Kamil Madrasah where he received his dakhil certificate in 1973 and alim certificate in 1975. He remained at the madrasa, graduating with fazil (honours) in 1977, and then completed kamil (masters) in Hadith studies at the Government Madrasah-e-Alia in Dhaka. He was awarded with Mumtaz Al-Muhadditheen, the highest Hadith award in the country. Some of his notable teachers include Ubaidul Haq, Ayub Ali, Muhammad Abdur Rahim, Fakhruddin Chatgami, Miya Muhammad Qasimi and Anwarul Haq Qasimi. In addition to his Islamic education, Jahangir undertook examinations for SSC and HSC at the Government Huseyn Shaheed Suhrawardy College in Magura and topped the Jessore Board. Additionally, at the time, those who won first place in Bangladesh's education boards were taken on a boat trip with erstwhile President Ziaur Rahman as part of the state honours.

Having completing his kamil degree, Jahangir became a teacher at the Nasna Nurnagar Siddiqia Dakhil Madrasa in Jheinadah. Two years later, he decided to pursue his goal of seeking further Islamic knowledge and enrolled at the Imam Muhammad ibn Saud Islamic University in Riyadh, Saudi Arabia. He completed his BA in 1986, MA in 1992 and PhD in 1997. Among his teachers in Saudi Arabia were Abd al-Aziz ibn Baz, Muhammad ibn al-Uthaymeen, Abdullah Ibn Jibreen and Saleh Al-Fawzan. Jahangir received two consecutive Student awards from the King Fahd of Saudi Arabia and the Governor of Riyadh, Salman bin Abdulaziz. During his studies in Saudi Arabia, Jahangir served as a translator and da'i for the North Riyadh Islamic Centre between 1993 and 1997. According to Abdus Salam Azadi, more than 300 foreign students (mainly Americans) converted to Islam as a result of the dawah of Abdullah Jahangir and Zaghloul El-Naggar at the time. In 1999, Jahangir visited Indonesia where he took extended training in Islamic development and Arabic language.

== Career ==
Jahangir served as the Imam of Jhenaidah Jameah, hund Central Eidgah until his deathand would regularly participate in public conferences and visit remote areas in the country to preach Islam. Many native scholars and others go on to praise him for his works. as in 2007, he was awarded the Best Literary Award by the Quran Education Society for his publication of Iḥyā as-Sunan.

=== As-Sunnah Trust, Al-Faruq Academy and Others ===
He established four institutions in total. The first, in 20 January 2011, was established as the "As-Sunnah Trust," a non-profit charity organisation focusing on social and religious services.

== Publications ==
He has numerous written works relating to Islam in different languages and among them, his most popular books include Hadīser Namé Jaliẏat and Rāhē Belaẏat, recognizing great popularity in Bangladesh, India and Pakistan.

List of publications:

- English
  - A Woman From Desert (1995)
  - Guidance For Fasting Muslims (1997)
  - A Summary Of Three Fundamentals of Islam. (1997)
- Bengali
  - Iḥyā as-Sunan -- January 2007 (Bengali: এহইয়াউস সুনান)
  - Qur'ān Sunnaher Aloke Poshak -- January 2007 (Bengali: কুরআন-সুন্নাহর আলোকে পোশাক)
  - Khutbah al-Islām, January 2008 -- (Bengali:খুতবাতুল ইসলাম)
  - Islāmer Name Jaṅgibād, January 2009 -- (Bengali:ইসলামের নামে জঙ্গিবাদ)
  - Qurbānī O Zabīḥullāh -- January 2010 (Bengali: কুরবানী ও জবিহুল্লাহ)
  - Rāhē Belaẏat -- January 2013 (Bengali:রাহে বেলায়াত) ISBN 978-984-90053-1-5 (similar to Al-Wabil al-Sayyib)
  - Hadīther Sanad-Bichār Paddhati O Ṣaḥīḥ Hadīther Aloke Ṣalāt al-ʿĪder Atirikta Takbīr -- January 2013 (Bengali: হাদীসের সনদ-বিচার পদ্ধতি ও সহীহ হাদীসের আলোকে সালাতুল ঈদের অতিরিক্ত তাকবীর) ISBN 978-984-90053-4-6
  - Pôbitrô Bible: Pôricitô O Pôrjalocôna -- January 2016 (Bengali:পবিত্র বাইবেলঃ পরিচিত ও পর্যালোচনা) ISBN 978-984-90053-7-7
  - Hadīther Name Jaliẏati -- January 2017 (Bengali: হাদিসের নামে জালিয়াতি) ISBN 978-984-90053-1-5
  - Qur'ān Sunnaher Aloke Islāmī ʿAqīdāh -- January 2017 (Bengali: কুরআন সুন্নাহের আলোকে ইসলামী আকিদা) ISBN 978-984-93281-0-0
  - Ṣalāter Maddhe Hāt Bāndhār Bidhān -- January 2017 (Bengali: সালাতের মধ্যে হাত বাঁধার বিধান) ISBN 978-984-90053-6-0
  - Ṣaḥīḥ Masnūn Waẓīfah -- January 2017 (Bengali: সহীহ মাসনূন ওযীফা) ISBN 978-984-90053-2-2
  - Furfurar Pīr ʿAllāmah Abū Jaʿfar Ṣiddīqī Rôchitô Al-Mawzuʿāt -- January 2017 (Bengali: ফুরফুরার পীর আল্লামা আবু জাফর সিদ্দিকী আল মাওজুয়াত) ISBN 978-984-93281-8-6
  - Jiggasha O Jobab (4 Part) -- January 2018 (Bengali: জিজ্ঞাসা ও জবাব) ISBN 978-984-93282-1-6, 978-984-93282-2-3, 978-984-93633-2-3, 978-984-93633-7-8
  - Ṣalāt, Duʿāʾ O Zikir -- January 2018 (Bengali: সালাত, দোয়া ও জিকির) ISBN 978-984-93633-1-6
  - Ramadānēr Saogat -- January 2018 (Bengali: রামাদানের সওগাত) ISBN 978-984-93633-0-9
  - ʿĪd-e-Mīlād an-Nabī -- January 2018 (Bengali: ঈদে মিলাদুন্নবী) ISBN 978-984-93282-9-2
  - Kitāb al-Muqaddas, Injīl Sharīf O ʿĪsāẏī Dharma -- January 2018 (Bengali: কিতাবুল মোকাদ্দস, ইঞ্জিল শরীফ ও ঈসায়ী ধর্ম) ISBN 978-984-90053-0-8
  - Roza (Bengali: রোজা)
  - Islāmer Tin Mūlnīti (Bengali: ইসলামের তিন মূলনীতি)
  - Ḥajjer Adhyāttik Shikkhā (Bengali: হজ্জ্বের আধ্যাত্মিক শিক্ষা) ISBN 978-984-93282-8-5
  - Rasūlullāh (Sa)-er Poshak o Poshaker Islāmī Bidhanmala 2008 (Bengali: রাসুলুল্লাহ (সা)-এর পোশাক ও পোশাকের ইসলামি বিধানমালা) ISBN 984-06--1184-4
  - Munājāt O Namāz (Bengali: মুনাজাত ও নামায)
  - Allāhr Pothe Daʿwat (Bengali: আল্লাহর পথে দাওয়াত)
  - Bangladeshe Ushôr Ba Fôsôler Zakat: Guruttô O Prôyog (Bengali: বাংলাদেশে উশর বা ফসলের যাকাত: গুরুত্ব ও প্রয়োগ)
  - Qur'ān Sunnahr Aloke Jamāʿat O Oikko, 2017 (Bengali: কুরআন সুন্নাহর আলোকে জামায়াত ও ঐক্য)
  - Musalmanī Neṣāb: Arakāne Islām O Waẓīfa-e-Rasūl, 2018 (Bengali: মুসলমানী নেসাব: আরাকানে ইসলাম ও ওযীফায়ে রাসূল (সা.)) ISBN 978-984-93282-3-0
- Arabic
  - Adab al-Ḥadīth, 2007 (Arabic: أدب الحديث)
  - Buḥūth fī al-ʿUlūm al-Ḥadīth, January 2007 (Arabic: بحوث في العلوم الحديث)
- Translatation:
  - ʿAlā Fiqh al-Akbar January 2014 (Bengali: আল ফিকহুল আকবর) ISBN 978-984-90053-5-3
  - Fiqh as-Sunan al-Āthār (3 Part) -- January 2019 (Bengali: ফিকহুস সুনান আল আসার) ISBN 978-984-93633-3-0, 978-984-93633-5-4, 978-984-93633-6-1
  - Ekjôn Japanī Narīr Drishtite Ḥijāb (Bengali: একজন জাপানি নারীর দৃষ্টিতে হিজাব)
  - Iẓhār al-Ḥaqq (3 part) -- January 2020 (Bengali: ইযহারুল হক) ISBN 978-984-93282-4-7, 978-984-93633-9-2

== Death and legacy ==
Abdullah Jahangir died in a road accident on spot on 11 May 2016, on the Dhaka-Khulna highway in Magura in a collision involving his car and a covered-van. Many condoled his passing.

In 2017, a memoir book was written, dedicated to Khandaker Abdullah Jahangir titled Preronar Batighor (Beacon of Inspiration) edited by Abul Kalam Azad Azhari of the Bangladesh National Mufassir Council. The book contains his biography, and memoirs written by Emajuddin Ahamed (former Vice-Chancellor of Dhaka University), poet Al Mahmud, advocate Muhammad Abdur Rouf and economist Shah Abdul Hannan. A conference in memory of him was held at the As-Safa Islamic Centre in New York City. In 2017, the Islamic University, Bangladesh held a seminar dedicated to his life. In 2020, As-Sunnah Publications released an official biography titled Juger Mohan Dai Dr. Khandaker Abdullah Jahangir (Rahimahullah), containing memoirs of the late scholar, written by several Islamic scholars of Bangladesh.

== Bibliography ==
- Azhari, Abul Kalam Azad, ed. (2017). Preronar Batighor প্রেরণার বাতিঘর স্মারকগ্রন্থ [The Beacon of Inspiration: A Memoir] (in Bengali). Dhaka: Bangladesh National Mufassir Council. p. 90. (Biography of Khandaker Abdullah Jahangir)

== See also ==
- Abubakar Muhammad Zakaria
- Sheikh Ahmadullah
