= Adil al-Kalbani =

Former Imam of Masjid al-Haram

Adil bin Salim bin Sa'eed al-Kalbani
- عادل بن سعيد الكلباني
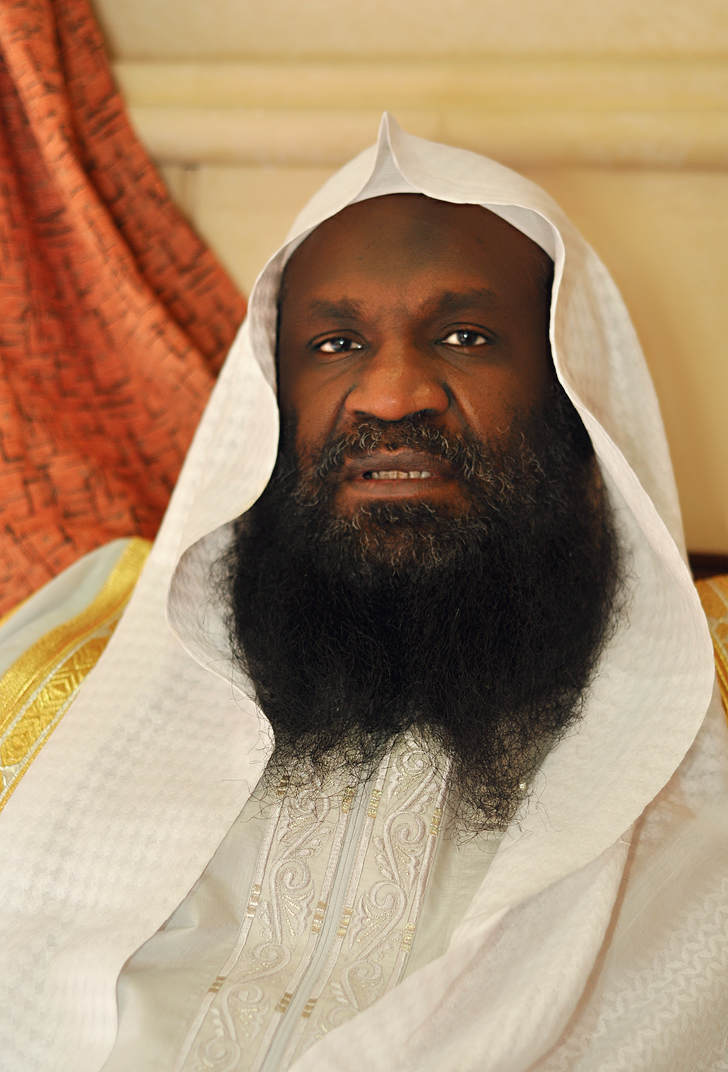
- Title: Sheikh

Personal life
- Born: April 3, 1959 (age 67) Riyadh, Saudi Arabia

Religious life
- Religion: Islam
- Denomination: Sunni

Muslim leader
- Influenced by: Muhammad ibn al Uthaymeen, Abd al-Aziz ibn Baz, Mohammed bin Nabhan bin Hussein, Abdullah ibn Jibreen

Adil al-Kalbani (Arabic: عادل الكلباني) is a Saudi Arabian Muslim cleric who served as an Imam of the Great Mosque of Mecca.

== Biography ==
=== Early years and studies ===
Adil al-Kalbani was born in Riyadh on April 4, 1958 to poor emigrants from Ras Al Khaimah in the United Arab Emirates who came to Saudi Arabia in the 1950s. His father used to work as a government clerk. Due to his family's financial situation, al-Kalbani took a job with Saudi Arabian Airlines after finishing high school, whilst attending evening classes at King Saud University.

Al-Kalbani's first teacher in his further Islamic studies was Hasan ibn Gaanim al-Gaanim. He studied Sahih al-Bukhari, Jami` at-Tirmidhi and the tafsir of Ibn Kathir with him. He also studied with Mustafa Muslim who taught the tafsir of al-Baydawi at Imam Muhammad ibn Saud Islamic University. He also studied Akhir Tadmariyah with Abdullah Ibn Jibreen and the Quran with Ahmad Mustafa. In 1994, he passed the government exam to become an Imam.

=== Career as Imam ===
After a brief stint working at the mosque in Riyadh Airport, he moved on to working as an Imam at the more prominent King Khalid Mosque. He once dreamed that he had become the imam at the Great Mosque of Mecca; two years later, in 2008, he was selected by King Abdullah to lead the tarawih prayers at the mosque.

In Japan's city of Bandu, a center of Minhaj-ul-Quran was visited by Al-Kalbani on June 30, 2013.

Al-Kalbani has said he is not a Shaykh (an authority in religious matters) but a Qari.

=== Personal life ===
He has two wives and twelve children.

== Views ==
=== Church bells ===
In a tweet from May 2015, al-Kalbani stated that the non-existence of church bells in Saudi Arabia pleased him.

=== Mecca crane collapse ===
On September 16, 2015, al-Kalbani criticised a tweet from a Saudi poet that said that the cranes that collapsed in Mecca five days earlier "fell to the ground in prayer". Al-Kalbani said that this was the "stupidest kind of nonsense". He sarcastically suggested that the other cranes did not collapse because they were "liberal".

=== Segregation of men and women ===
In May 2019, al-Kalbani criticised the current situation of gender segregation in mosques, where women are "completely isolated" from men and only connected via a microphone. He called this a "phobia of women".

=== Shias ===
In a 2009 interview with the BBC, al-Kalbani declared Twelver Shias as apostates, which triggered a backlash from followers of the sect in Saudi Arabia. In 2019, however, he retracted his position after reading a book by fellow scholar Hatim al-Awni, stating that he no longer considers as apostates those who "believe in one God, eat our halal meat, and prostrate toward our Qibla direction of Mecca".

=== Stance on musical instruments ===
In a fatwa, al-Kalbani considered singing to be permissible under Islamic law, but retracted it in 2010. In 2019, he backtracked on his retraction and again considered it permissible. In December 2015, al-Kalbani attended a religious singing event where a flute was purportedly used.

== Filmography ==
In November 2021 he appeared in a promotional video for Combat Field - Riyadh Season 2021.
