= Saad al-Shithri =

Saudi Arabian cleric

Saad al-Shathri
- سعد الشثري
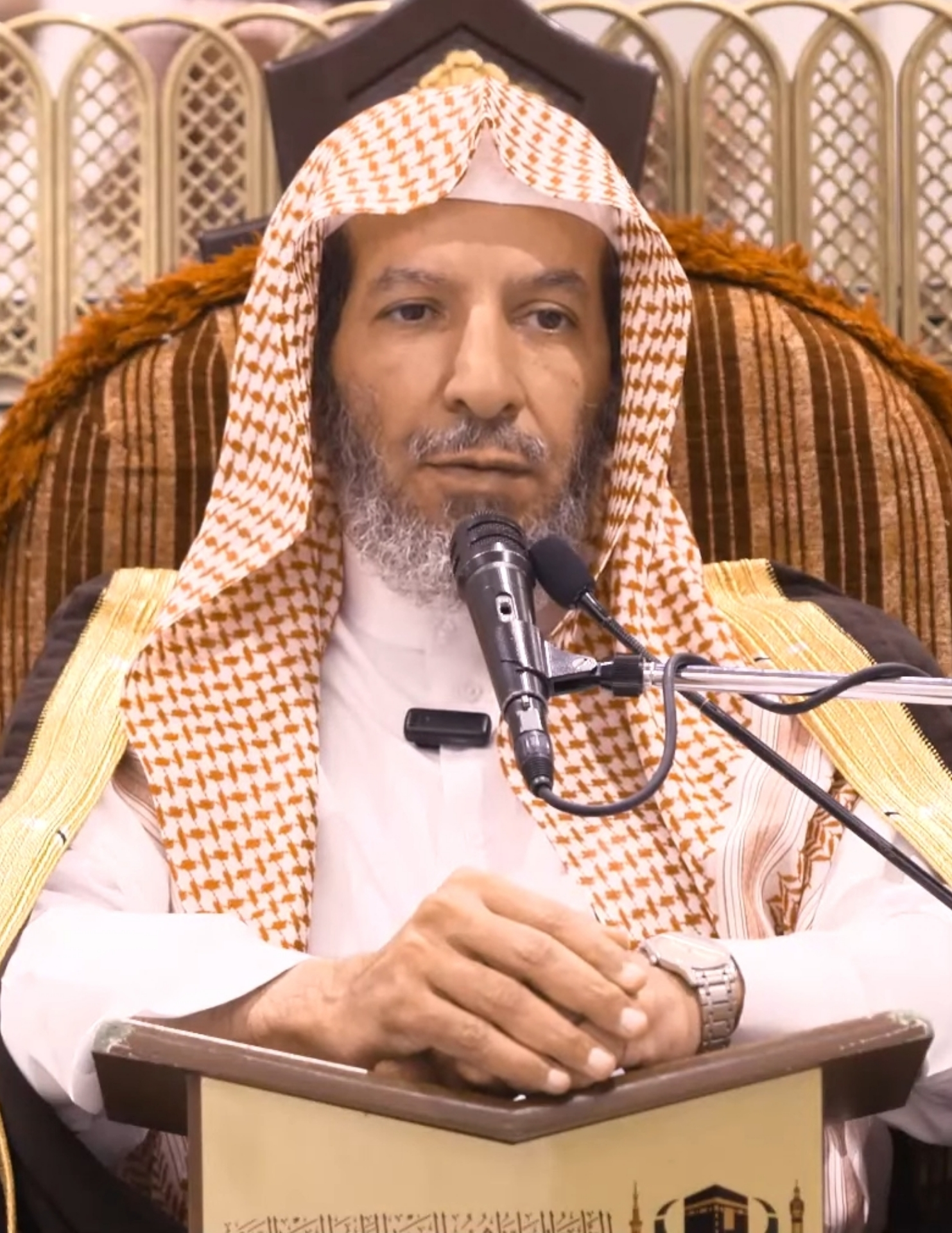
- Sheikh Saad Al-Shathri delivers a lecture at the Prophet's Mosque in 2023
- Born: 1964 (age 61–62); Riyadh, Saudi Arabia
- Other name: Saad ibn Nasser Al-Shathri
- Education: Imam Muhammad ibn Saud Islamic University
- Father: Nasser Al-Shathri

Saad ibn Nasser al-Shathri (Arabic: سعد بن ناصر الشثري; born 1964/65) is an Islamic scholar from Saudi Arabia. Since 2015, he has been a member of the country's Council of Senior Scholars and an advisor to the royal court of King Salman.

== Family ==
Saad al-Shathri is "a member of a well-known family of ulama who had been in the service of the royal family for some time." His father, Nasser al-Shathri, is known as "the advisor of kings" as he has served in advisory roles for King Khalid, King Fahd, King Abdullah, and King Salman. His grandfather, Abd al-Aziz al-Shathri, was a notable scholar who was appointed by King Abd al-Aziz to serve the main religious figure, filling the position of religious teacher, judge and khatib, for the newly established city of al-Rayn in 1918. He continued in this position until King Abd al-Aziz's death in 1953, at which point the then-grand mufti of Saudi Arabia, Muhammad ibn Ibrahim Al ash-Sheikh, invited him to be a teacher in the capital, Riyadh. He moved to Riyadh in 1954 and taught a number of students who went on to assume positions as teachers and judges themselves.

== Education ==
al-Shathri obtained his bachelor's, master's and doctorate degrees from the Department of Shar'iah in the Imam Muhammad ibn Saud Islamic University in Riyadh. He completed his master's degree in 1988 and his PhD in Usul al-Fiqh in 1996.

Some of al-Shathri's most important teachers include former grand muftis Abd al-Aziz bin Baz, Abdulaziz al-Sheikh, and former member of the Council of Senior Scholars Abdullah al-Ghudayyan.

== Career ==
al-Shathri has worked in a variety of instruction roles in the Department of Shar'iah in the Imam Muhammad ibn Saud Islamic University in Riyadh, beginning as a teaching assistant in 1988 and moving up to the level of lecturer and professor. As of 2020, he is an associate professor in the Department of Shari'ah.

al-Shathri also holds teaching positions at a number of other universities, in most cases teaching fiqh or usul al-fiqh. Since 2012, he has been a member of the teaching faculty at King Saud University in Riyadh. He also teaches at the Islamic University of Madinah and Knowledge International University, and he is an advisory committee member at the International Open University based in The Gambia.

al-Shathri also served as the Dean of Knowledge International University, a distance education university based in Saudi Arabia, between 2011 and 2017.

As of 2020, al-Shathri has written more than 60 books and has published more than 10 articles in scholarly journals.

al-Shathri was appointed to the Council of Senior Scholars in 2005 where he remained until being removed in 2009. He was reinstated to the council in 2015, and also appointed as an advisor to the royal court of King Salman.

al-Shathri was selected to give the khutbah at on the Day of Arafah during the 2017 Hajj pilgrimage. He used this opportunity to address a global audience to denounce sectarianism and terrorism and to highlight the importance of security and stability in Islamic texts.

== KAUST controversy ==
In 2009, al-Shathri stated that religious scholars should be able to oversee the curriculum of the new King Abdullah University of Science and Technology (KAUST), a key project of then-ruler King Abdullah. He also criticized the mixed-gender format of the university. al-Shithri was one of several cleric to voice similar concerns. In the days after these comments, 18 articles from liberal Saudi news outlets criticized al-Shathri for his remarks, the first of which being written by then-editor and chief of al-Watan newspaper, Jamal al-Khashoggi. al-Shathri attempted to clarify his comments and affirm the importance of the university's role in the country's progress in a letter to al-Watan in which he also claimed that al-Khashoggi had misrepresented his stance. Shortly thereafter, al-Shathri was relieved of his duties as a member of the Council of Senior Scholars by a royal decree of King Abdullah.

al-Shathri was later reinstated to a role in the Council of Senior Scholars in 2015 by the next ruler, King Salman, who also appointed him as an advisor to his royal court one week after having assumed the role of King.
