= Mohammed bin Abdullah bin Oudah al-Sa'wi =

- Father: Abdullah bin Oudah al-Sa'wi

Mohammed bin Abdullah bin Oudah al-Sa'wi was a Saudi jurist, judge, and minister. He served as a consultant at the Saudi Royal Court, Chief of the Riyadh Court, and General President for Girls' Education. Among his works is: Risala fi Usul al-Aqidah (A Treatise on the Foundations of Creed), in addition to his critical editing of the book Al-Risala al-Tadmuriyyah and the book Sharh al-Asbahaniyyah. He died on 25 Rabi' al-Thani 1437 AH, corresponding to February 4, 2016.

Political offices
Preceded by None	Secretary-General of the Council of Senior Scholars; 1391 AH –	Succeeded by Abdulaziz bin Abdullah al-Falih
Preceded by Rashid bin Khunain	President of the General Administration for Girls' Education	Succeeded by Abdulaziz al-Musnad
