= Council of Senior Scholars =

Council of Senior Scholars may refer to:

- Council of Senior Scholars (Saudi Arabia)
- Council of Senior Scholars (Egypt)
