= Militancy in the name of Islam =

Book on Militancy by Khandaker Abdullah Jahangir

Militancy in the name of Islam: discussed and non-discussed reasons
- Author: Khandaker Abdullah Jahangir
- Language: Bengali
- Genre: Religion; Militancy; Islam; History; Politics
- Published: August, 2006
- Publisher: As-Sunnah Publications
- Publication place: Bangladesh
- Pages: 121

"Militancy in the name of Islam: discussed and non-discussed reasons", mainly Islam er Name Jongibad: Alochito O Onalochito Karonsomuho (Bengali: ইসলামের নামে জঙ্গিবাদ: আলোচিত ও অনালোচিত কারণসমূহ) is a 2016 bengali language book by Khandaker Abdullah Jahangir which explains the political aspects of Islam and the spread and conspiracy of militancy in the name of Islam according to the Quran and Hadith. The book was first published in August 2006. The book is very popular among Bengali Salafi-Ahl al-Hadith communities. Many bengali scholars has prescribed the book as authentic and reliable including Abubakar Muhammad Zakaria.

== Contents ==
According to Khandaker Abdullah Jahangir, the reasons for the spread of 'Militism or Terrorism' is the Western conspiracy against Islam, Israel, imperialism, oil and religion, massacre of Muslims worldwide, suppression of Islam in Muslim countries, unemployment, depression, etc. In the book, he says that irreligion and secularism are not the same. He also says in the book that the term "militant" is often used indiscriminately by Islamophobic media outlets to refer to Muslims.

Abdullah Jahangir's book criticizes the indiscriminate labeling of terrorist acts as Islamization. In his view, terrorism may be hidden within any community, and identifying terrorists solely with a particular ethnic group becomes an obstacle to ensuring justice. Additionally, the book addresses the extremist ideology of the Kharijites and outlines their defining traits.

== Importance ==
This book and the book "Islamer Drishte Jongibad O Shontrash (Extremism Militancy and Terrorism in the view of Islam)" written by former Neo-JMB Shura member Sohel Mahfuz alias Nasrullah's uncle Akramuzzaman bin Abdus Salam, the Bangladesh-based director of the Kuwait-based Revival of Islamic Heritage Society, influenced former JMB militant Rashidul Islam to abandon militant activities in 2010, who was later killed by other JMB members for deserting the party.

== See also ==
- Al-Siyasa al-Shar'iyya fi Islah al-Ra'i wa al-Ra'iyya
- Islamophobia
- Counter Terrorism and Transnational Crime
- Md. Asaduzzaman (police officer)
