= Ibn Jibrin =

Saudi Islamic scholar (1933–2009)

Shaykh Ibn Jibrin
- Title: Allamah

Personal life
- Born: 1933 Riyadh Province
- Died: 13 July 2009 (aged 75–76) Riyadh

Religious life
- Religion: Islam
- Denomination: Sunni
- Jurisprudence: Hanbali
- Creed: Athari
- Movement: Salafism

Muslim leader
- Influenced by: Ahmad ibn Hanbal; Ibn Taymiyya; Ibn al-Qayyim; Muhammad ibn Abd al-Wahhab; Muhammad ibn Ibrahim Al ash-Sheikh; Sayyid Qutb
- Influenced: Salafi jihadism

Abd Allah ibn Abd al-Rahman ibn Jibrin (Arabic: عبد الله ابن عبد الرحمن ابن جبرين, romanized: ʿAbd Allāh ibn ʿAbd al-Raḥmān ibn Jibrīn; 1933 – 13 July 2009), known simply as Ibn Jibrin, was a Saudi Islamic scholar who was a member of the Council of Senior Scholars and Permanent Committee for Islamic Research and Issuing Fatwas in Saudi Arabia.

He was a member of the Council of Senior Scholars and Permanent Committee for Islamic Research and Issuing Fatwas in Saudi Arabia.

Ibn Jibrin's death in 2009 was widely mourned in Saudi Arabia. He was often considered the third most leading Saudi Salafi scholar after Ibn Baz and Ibn Uthaymin.

== Career ==
Ibn Jibrin was born in 1933 in a village near the town of al-Quway'iyya in the Najd region in Saudi Arabia.

He received his secondary school certificate in 1958, a bachelor's degree in Shariah in 1961, master's degree in 1970 from the Higher Institute for the Judiciary, and a doctorate in 1987. "Several judges, teachers and religious callers were taught by him".

== Views ==
He has been described as a member of the "hard-line conservative schools of Sunni Islam who have deemed Shias as infidels". Commenting on Shias in 2007 (during height of Shia Sunni sectarian violence in Iraq), Ibn Jibrin said: "Some people say that the rejectionists (Rafida) are Muslims because they believe in God and his prophet, pray and fast. But I say they are heretics. They are the most vicious enemy of Muslims, who should be wary of their plots. They should be boycotted and expelled so that Muslims spared of their evil." He has been criticized by Abd al-Aziz al-Hakim, a political leader of Iraqi Shias. Iraqi Islamic scholar Ali al-Sistani, a leading Shia, has also criticized Ibn Jibrin, accusing him of exacerbating tensions between Shiites and Sunnis in Iraq.

After the September 11 attacks, Ibn Jibrin issued a fatwa against hijackings. In regard to Muslims having contact with non-Muslims, he states that "being a companion to them and showing love for them" may be forgiven if the goal of these acts is to convert them to Islam:

"It is allowed to mix with the disbelievers, sit with them and be polite with them as means of calling them to Allah, explaining to them the teachings of Islam, encouraging them to enter this religion and to make it clear to them the good result of accepting the religion and the evil result of punishment for those who turn away. For this purpose, being a companion to them and showing love for them is overlooked in order to reach that good final goal."

== Death ==
In Safar 1430 AH, Ibn Jibreen suffered serious health problems and was admitted to hospital, where he underwent surgery on his heart arteries. Although his condition initially improved after the operation, he later developed pneumonia. By order of King Abdullah bin Abdulaziz, he was transferred to Germany for treatment, marking the first time he had travelled outside Saudi Arabia. He later returned to the Kingdom to continue his treatment.

On 20 Rajab 1430 AH (13 July 2009), Ibn Jibreen died at the age of 80 at King Faisal Specialist Hospital in Riyadh. His funeral prayer was held the following day at Imam Turki bin Abdullah Mosque and was attended by thousands of mourners. He was subsequently buried at Al Oud cemetery in Riyadh.
