= Permanent Committee for Scholarly Research and Ifta =

Islamic organization in Saudi Arabia

- اللجنة الدائمة للبحوث العلمية والإفتاء
- Headquarters: Saudi Arabia

The Permanent Committee for Scholarly Research and Ifta (also the General Presidency of Scholarly Research and Ifta, Arabic: اللجنة الدائمة للبحوث العلمية والإفتاء, romanized: al-Lajna ad-Dāʾima lil-Buḥūṯ al-ʿIlmiyya wal-Iftāʾ) is an Islamic organization in Saudi Arabia established by the King that issues rulings in Islamic jurisprudence (fiqh) and prepares research papers for the Council of Senior Scholars, which advises the king on religious matters. Its members are drawn from the Council of Senior Scholars, of which it is a committee, and consist of the most senior Sunni scholars of fiqh in Saudi Arabia, including the Grand Mufti of Saudi Arabia as its head. The issuance of fataawa in Saudi Arabia is limited to members of the Council of Senior Scholars and a few other clerics.

== Establishment ==
The committee was established along with the Council of Senior Scholars by royal decree on August 29, 1971 (8th of Rajab 1391 AH) by King Faisal ibn Abd al-Aziz of Saudi Arabia. Under section four of the decree, it stated,

"The Permanent Committee has been left the task of selecting its members from amongst the members of the Council (of Senior Scholars) in accordance with the Royal Decree. Its aim is to prepare research papers ready for discussion amongst the Council (of Senior Scholars), and issue fataawa on individual issues. This is by responding to the fatwa-seeking public in areas of 'aqeedah, 'ibaadah and social issues. It will be called: The Permanent Committee for Islamic Research and Fataawa (al-Lajnah ad-Daa'imah lil-Buhooth al-'Ilmiyyah wal-Iftaa.)"

It is possible to write to the Permanent Committee asking for a fatwa on a specific topic. Since its inception, the Permanent Committee has replied to Muslims not only in Saudi Arabia but in many other countries, seeking rulings in fiqh (Islamic jurisprudence) on a variety of questions, including hadith (sayings of the Islamic prophet Muhammad), ibadah (worship), and aqeedah (Islamic creed) issues.

In their fataawa, the Permanent Committee strive for thoroughness. All fataawa are derived from evidence from the three sources of Islamic knowledge: the Qur'an, authentic Sunnah, and understanding of the rightly guided companions of Muhammad. The fataawa writers will usually explain all the potential Islamic viewpoints of an issue and will then explain, which in their view is the most authentic opinion based on the evidence. The fatwas issued by the committee have been arranged in a compendium of 32 volumes.

== Authority ==
In 2010, Saudi King Abdullah decreed that only officially approved religious scholars would be allowed to issue fatwas in Saudi Arabia, namely the 21 member Council of Senior Scholars, the country's highest religious body, and the (four or five) member Permanent Committee, whose members are drawn from the Council of Senior Scholars. A new committee affiliated with the Permanent Committee and headed by Sheikh Saleh bin Mohammed al-Luhaydan from among the prestigious Salafi scholars of the modern era was created by the Council of Senior Scholars to supervise the issuance of fatwas and prevent unauthorized scholars from issuing any. All imams and preachers were instructed by the Ministry of Islamic Affairs to abide by the edict and explain it their Friday sermons and violators were reprimanded.

== Members ==
=== Current ===
As of November 2026 the members of the committee include:

- Sheikh Dr. Saleh bin Fawzan bin Abdullah Al-Fawza (President of the committee, and Grand Mufti of Saudi Arabia)
- Sheikh Dr. Abdulsalam bin Abdullah bin Mohammed Al-Suleiman
- Sheikh Dr. Saad bin Nasser bin Abdulaziz Al-Shithri
- Sheikh Dr. Mohammed bin Hassan bin Abdul Rahman Aal Al Sheikh

=== Former ===
- Shaykh Abdul-Aziz ibn Abdullah Al Shaykh (Former Grand Mufti of Saudi Arabia)
- Abd al-Aziz ibn Baz (Former Grand Mufti of Saudi Arabia)
- Abdullah al-Ghudayyan
- Abdullah Ibn Jibreen
- Bakr Abu Zayd
- Abdullaah Ibn Hasan al-Qu'ood
- Shaykh ‘Abdullah Ibn Sulayman Ibn Mani
- Abdulkarim bin Abdullah Al-Khudair
- Abd al-Razzaq Afifi (Former Deputy Chairman)
- Ibrahim bin Muhammad Al Sheikh
