= Abdullah al-Ghudayyan =

Saudi Arabian Salafist Muslim scholar (1926–2010)

Personal life
- Born: 1926 Al Zulfi, Riyadh, Saudi Arabia
- Died: 1 June 2010 (aged 84) Riyadh, Saudi Arabia
- Region: Middle East
- Main interest(s): Sharia, Fiqh, Hadith
- Occupation: Member of Council of Senior Scholars; Member of the Permanent Committee for Islamic Research and Issuing Fatwas

Religious life
- Religion: Islam
- Denomination: Sunni
- Jurisprudence: Hanbali
- Creed: Athari
- Movement: Salafism

Abdullah ibn Abdur-Rahman al-Ghudayyan (1926 – 1 June 2010) was a Saudi Arabian Islamic scholar, a leading proponent of the Salafi form of Islam and a member of the Saudi Council of Senior Scholars. His ancestry was of the tribe of Banu Anbar.

== Career ==
In 1971 he was appointed as a member of the Council of Senior Scholars (Saudi Arabia).

In addition to his work with the Permanent Committee for Scholarly Research and Ifta in 1975 he began giving lessons to students at Imam Muhammad ibn Saud Islamic University within the Faculty of Sharia and Faculty of Fiqh.

When Abdullah ibn Humayd died in 1982, he overtook the role of giving Fatwa on the radio program Nur Ala Al-Darb, which has been described as "one of the oldest and most famous programs broadcast on the Quran radio channel, where a number of major scholars answer questions and give fatwas."

== Students ==
Abdullah al-Ghudayyan had a number of notable students, including:

- Saleh Al al-Sheikh, Minister of Islamic Affairs for Saudi Arabia
- Abdur-Rahman al-Sudais, Imam of the Grand Mosque in Mecca and President of the General Presidency for the Affairs of the Two Holy Mosques
- Saud al-Shuraim, imam and khatib of the Grand Mosque in Mecca
- Abd al-Kareem al-Khudayr, a member of the Saudi Council of Senior Scholars
- Saad al-Shithri, a member of the Saudi Council of Senior Scholars

== Death ==
Abdullah ibn Abdur-Rahman al-Ghudayyan died on Tuesday 1 June 2010.
