= Grand Mufti of Saudi Arabia =

Position of religious authority in Saudi Arabia

- مفتي عام المملكة العربية السعودية
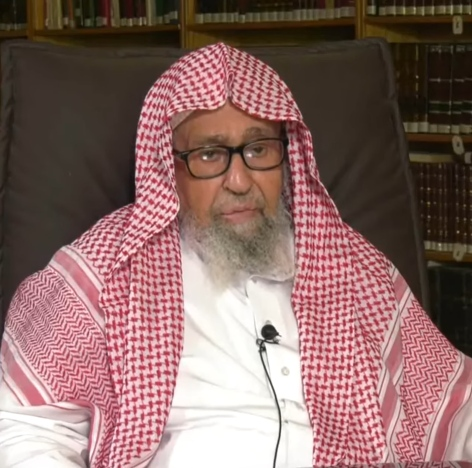
- Incumbent; Salih al‑Fawzan since 22 October 2025
- Office of the Grand Mufti of Saudi Arabia
- Style: Grand Mufti; Sheikh
- Type: Religious leadership / Advisory
- Status: Grand Mufti of Saudi Arabia
- Member of: Permanent Committee for Scholarly Research and Ifta; Council of Senior Scholars
- Appointer: King of Saudi Arabia
- Term length: Life tenure (no fixed term)
- Formation: 1953 (73 years ago) (abolished 1969; restored 1993)
- First holder: Mohammed bin Ibrahim

The Grand Mufti of Saudi Arabia (Note: Arabic: مفتي عام المملكة العربية السعودية, romanized: Muftī ʿĀmm al-Mamlaka al-ʿArabiyya al-Suʿūdiyya) is the highest-ranking and most influential religious and legal authority in Saudi Arabia. The position is appointed by the King of Saudi Arabia. The Grand Mufti serves as the head of the Permanent Committee for Islamic Research and Ifta.

== Role ==
The Grand Mufti of Saudi Arabia serves as the highest-ranking religious authority in the country and serves as the leading figure in issuing religious legal opinions (fatwas) on a wide range of legal, social, and ethical matters. His interpretations and rulings carry significant weight within the Saudi Judicial system, which is largely based on Islamic law (Sharia).

The Grand Mufti also serves as chairman of the Council of Senior Scholars, the Kingdom's highest religious body. He also heads the Permanent Committee for Scholarly Research and Ifta, which oversees the preparation and issuance of official fatwas and conducts scholarly research on Islamic jurisprudence and theology.

== History ==
The office of the Grand Mufti of Saudi Arabia was established in 1953 by King Abdulaziz, with Muhammad ibn Ibrahim Al ash-Sheikh appointed as the first Grand Mufti. Historically, the position was held by members of the Al ash-Sheikh family, descendants of Muhammad ibn Abd al-Wahhab, with the exception of Ibn Baz. In 1969, King Faisal abolished the office of Grand Mufti and replaced it with Ministry of Justice and Council of Senior Scholars. The position was reinstated in 1993 with the appointment of Ibn Baz as the second Grand Mufti.

After the death of Ibn Baz in 1999, King Fahd appointed Abdulaziz Al Sheikh, a member of the Al ash-Sheikh family, who served as Grand Mufti from 1999 until his death on 23 September 2025.

On 22 October 2025, King Salman appointed Salih al‑Fawzan as the fourth Grand Mufti.

== List of incumbents ==
| No. | Portrait | Name (Birth–death) (age) | Tenure | |
| No. | Portrait | Name (Birth–death) (age) | Started–Ended | Duration |
|---|---|---|---|---|
| 1 | – | Muhammad ibn Ibrahim Al al-Sheikh (1890–1969) (age 79) | 1953–1969 | 16 years |
Vacant
The post was abolished by King Faisal in 1969.; The post was restored by King Fahd in 1993.
| 2 | – | Ibn Baz (1912–1999) (age 86) | 1993–1999 | 5 years, 313 days |
| 3 | | Abdulaziz ibn Abdullah Al al-Sheikh (1943–2025) (age 81) | 14 May 1999 – 23 September 2025 | 26 years, 132 days |
| 4 | | Saleh al-Fawzan (born 1935) (age 90) | 22 October 2025 | 323 days |

== See also ==
- Grand Mufti
- Mufti
- Legal system of Saudi Arabia
