= JMB =

JMB may refer to:

== People ==
- John Moses Browning, Mormon small arms architect
- José Manuel Barroso, a European politician
- José María Balcázar, Peruvian politician and lawyer
- Jorge Mario Bergoglio, an Argentine Roman Catholic cardinal also known as Pope Francis
- Jean-Michel Basquiat, American artist
- Jean-Michel Byron, South African musician

== Organisations ==
- JMB Realty, a Chicago real estate company
- Jamaat-ul-Mujahideen Bangladesh, Islamist militant terrorist organization
- Joint Matriculation Board (earlier known as the Northern Universities Joint Matriculation Board), a body in the United Kingdom which awarded O levels and A levels
- The JAL Mileage Bank, the frequent flyer program of Japan Airlines
- Johnson Matthey Bankers, the core of a 1984 banking crisis
- JMicron, a technology company. Linux reports their devices as JMB363 or similar
- James M. Bennett High School, in Salisbury, Maryland
- Journal of Molecular Biology, a weekly scientific journal
- JMB Racing, a Monegasque racing team
- Jorhat Municipal Board, an Indian municipal board
