= Salih al‑Fawzan =

Grand Mufti of Saudi Arabia since 2025

Sheikh Salih al-Fawzan
- صالح الفوزان
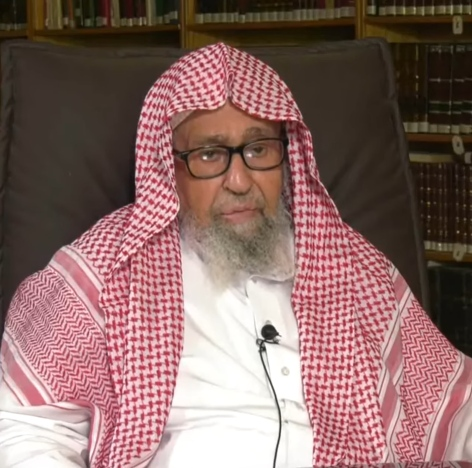
- al-Fawzan in 2019

Grand Mufti of Saudi Arabia
- Incumbent
- Assumed office 22 October 2025
- Preceded by: Abdulaziz Al al-Sheikh

Personal life
- Born: Sāliḥ bin Fawzān bin ‘Abd Allāh al-Fawzān; 28 September 1935 (age 91); 1 Rajab 1354 AH Ash-Shamsiyyah, Al-Qassim Province, Saudi Arabia
- Citizenship: Saudi Arabia
- Era: Modern
- Region: Arabian Peninsula
- Main interest(s): ‘Aqida, Fiqh
- Education: Imam Muhammad ibn Saud Islamic University
- Website: https://alfawzan.af.org.sa/ (formerly)

Religious life
- Religion: Islam
- Denomination: Sunni
- Jurisprudence: Hanbali
- Creed: Athari
- Movement: Salafism

Muslim leader
- Influenced by: Ahmad ibn Hanbal, Ibn Taymiyya, Ibn Qayyim al-Jawziyya, Muhammad ibn Abd al-Wahhab, Aba Butayn, Abd al-Aziz ibn Baz, Muhammad al-Uthaymin
- Influenced: Abd Al-Aziz Fawzan Al-Fawzan

Sāliḥ bin Fawzān bin ‘Abd Allāh al-Fawzān (Note: Arabic: صالح بن فوزان بن عبد الله الفوزان, romanized: Ṣāleḥ bin Fawzān bin ʿAbd Allāh al-Fawzān) (born 28 September 1935) is a Saudi Islamic scholar who is the fourth and current Grand Mufti of Saudi Arabia, serving since 22 October 2025. He is regarded as one of the senior scholars within the Salafi movement.

Al-Fawzan is also a member of Saudi Arabia's Council of Senior Scholars and the fiqh council in Mecca, affiliated with the Muslim World League. He also serves as a member of the Supervisory Committee for Preachers during Hajj, and a member of the Permanent Committee for Scholarly Research and Ifta in the Saudi Arabia. In addition to this, he is an imam, khatib and teacher at the Prince Mutaib bin Abdulaziz Al Saud Mosque in Riyadh. He participates in the radio program Nūr 'Alā al-Darb, answering questions on Islamic topics, and contributes to scholarly journals in the form of research, studies, letters, and fatwas.

== Early life ==
Saleh al-Fawzan was born on 28 September 1935 (1354 AH) in Ash-Shamasiyyah in the Al-Qassim Province of the Kingdom of Saudi Arabia, near the city of Buraydah. He belongs to the Al-Wadain branch of the Al-Shammās clan of the Ad-Dawāsir tribe. His great grandfather on his mother's side is Aba Butayn. His father died during his early childhood, and he was raised by his family. He learned the Quran, and received his initial instruction in reading and writing from local mosque's imām, Ḥamūd ibn Sulaymān At-Tilāl, who later served as a judge (Qadi) in the town of Dariyah, Al-Qassim Province of the Saudi Arabia.

=== Education ===
Al-Fawzan enrolled in the public school in Ash-Shamasiyyah in 1950 (1369 AH). He completed his education at Al-Faysaliyyah School in Buraydah in 1952 (1371 AH), and was appointed as a primary school teacher. He then enrolled at the Ma'had Al-'Ilmī (The Institute of Knowledge) in Buraydah when it opened in 1954 (1373 AH), and graduated from it in 1958 (1377 AH). He joined the Kullīyat Ash-Sharīʿah (The College of Sharīʿah) in Riyadh and graduated in 1962 (1381 AH).

Al-Fawzan later obtained a master’s degree in fiqh in the field of inheritance law, with a thesis titled: "Al-Taḥqīqāt Al-Marḍiyyah fī Al-Mabāḥith Al-Farḍiyyah" (A Satisfactory investigation into the issues of obligatory Shares in Inheritance). He subsequently obtained a doctorate in fiqh from the same college, with a dissertation titled: "Aḥkām Al-Aṭʿimah fī Al-Sharīʿah Al-Islāmiyyah" (The Rulings of Foods in the Islamic Sharīʿah).

== Career ==
After completing his doctorate, Al-Fawzan was appointed as a teacher at the Ma'had al-'Ilmī (Institute of Knowledge) at the Imam Muhammad ibn Saud Islamic University in Riyadh. He subsequently taught at Kullīyat al-Sharī'a (The College of Sharia), then transferred to teach in the postgraduate program at Kullīyat Uṣūl al-Dīn (College of Fundamentals of Religion), then at the Ma'had al-'Ālī li al-Qaḍā (Higher Institute of Judiciary), where he was later appointed director. He later served as the head of Saudi Arabia's Supreme Court of Justice before returning to teaching following the conclusion of his tenure.

As of 2013, he was appointed as a member of the Council of Senior Scholars, Saudi Arabia's highest religious body, which directly advises the King of Saudi Arabia. He is also currently a member of the fiqh council in Mecca, which is affiliated with the Muslim World League, and of the Permanent Committee for Scholarly Research and Ifta, a subcommittee of the Council of Senior Scholars responsible for issuing legal opinions (fatwas) in Islamic jurisprudence (fiqh) and preparing research papers for the Council.

Al-Fawzan serves on the Supervisory Committee for Preachers during Hajj and is an imam, khatib and teacher at the Prince Mutaib bin Abdulaziz Al Saud Mosque in Riyadh. He is one of the scholars featured on the Nūr 'Alā al-Darb radio program, described as one of the oldest and most famous programs broadcast on the Quran radio channel, where senior scholars answer questions and issue fatwas. He also contributes regularly to scholarly journals through research, studies, letters, and fatwas, supervises academic theses at the master’s and doctoral levels, and teaches students of Islamic knowledge in ongoing lessons and study circles.

=== Relationship with Ibn Baz ===
Ibn Baz, the former Grand Mufti of Saudi Arabia, was among the scholars under whom al-Fawzan studied and by whom he was influenced. Al-Fawzan studied 'Ilm al-Mawārīth (Knowledge of Islamic Inheritance) under Ibn Baz at Kullīyat al-Sharī'a (College of Sharia) in Riyadh, and regularly attended his lessons, lectures, and scholarly gatherings (halaqa). He also listened to his radio programs on Islamic knowledge and fatwas.

When al-Fawzan began working at Dār Al-Iftā' (The Fatwa Office), Ibn Baz served as his supervisor and director. Al-Fawzan later stated that he benefited from Ibn Baz in various aspects of Islamic scholarship, particularly in precision and caution when issuing fatwas, striving for accuracy and correctness, and maintaining patience and perseverance in scholarly work. He also learned from him the importance of grounding legal opinions in evidence from the Quran and Sunna, and of exercising responsibility and restraint in delivering religious rulings.

== Controversies ==
Al-Fawzan has attracted criticism for a number of public statements and religious opinions. In 2003, he was quoted as saying that "slavery is a part of Islam" and that Muslims who deny this are ignorant and not scholars, comments that drew criticism for contradicting some contemporary interpretations of Islamic law. He has also described public demonstrations as haram, characterizing them as practices of non-Muslims that can lead to division and violence.

In 2010, he called for a boycott against Adil al-Kalbani, who had stated that music was not haram (forbidden in Islam). The campaign was a fiasco, as the mosque was overcrowded during Adil al-Kalbani's next sermon.

In 2011, opposing the Saudi Ministry of Justice's proposal to set a minimum age for girls' marriage, he reportedly issued a legal opinion authorizing fathers to marry off their daughters "even if they are still in the cradle".

In 2014, Saleh al-Fawzan denied reports that he issued a fatwa banning open buffets, clarifying on his website that he had only commented that food of unspecified quantity should not be sold without specification. His statement addressed restaurants where customers pay a fixed price for unspecified portions.

In 2015, he was quoted as saying that “Muslims must set aside games and frivolity and take up God’s work. They must not waste their time following games and frivolity, especially not during the blessed month of Ramadan. This is true for Muslims in general, and the younger generation in particular... These games have no use, and they are harmful and a waste of time.”

In 2016, Saleh al-Fawzan has issued other rulings that have drawn attention in Western media, including a fatwa reportedly prohibiting the mobile game Pokémon Go, which he classified as a form of gambling. He has also been reported to consider photography generally prohibited except when necessary.

In 2017, he was reported to have referred to Shia Muslims as "brothers of Satan" and stated that they are "infidels" who "lie about God, his prophet, and the consensus of Muslims", remarks that have been cited as an example of sectarian rhetoric among some Saudi clerics.

Al-Fawzan's supporters argue that his statements reflect traditional jurisprudence and adherence to Salafi teachings while critics contend that his pronouncements promote intolerance and discourage reform.

== Grand Mufti of Saudi Arabia ==
On 22 October 2025, under recommendation by Crown Prince Muhammad bin Salman, King Salman appointed al-Fawzan as Grand Mufti of Saudi Arabia, succeeding Abdulaziz Al al-Sheikh.

== Notes ==
Religious titles
Preceded by Abdulaziz Al Sheikh	Grand Mufti of Saudi Arabia; Since 2025	Succeeded by N/A
