= Abdulaziz Al Sheikh =

Grand Mufti of Saudi Arabia from 1999 to 2025

Sheikh Abdulaziz Al Sheikh عبد العزيز آل الشيخ
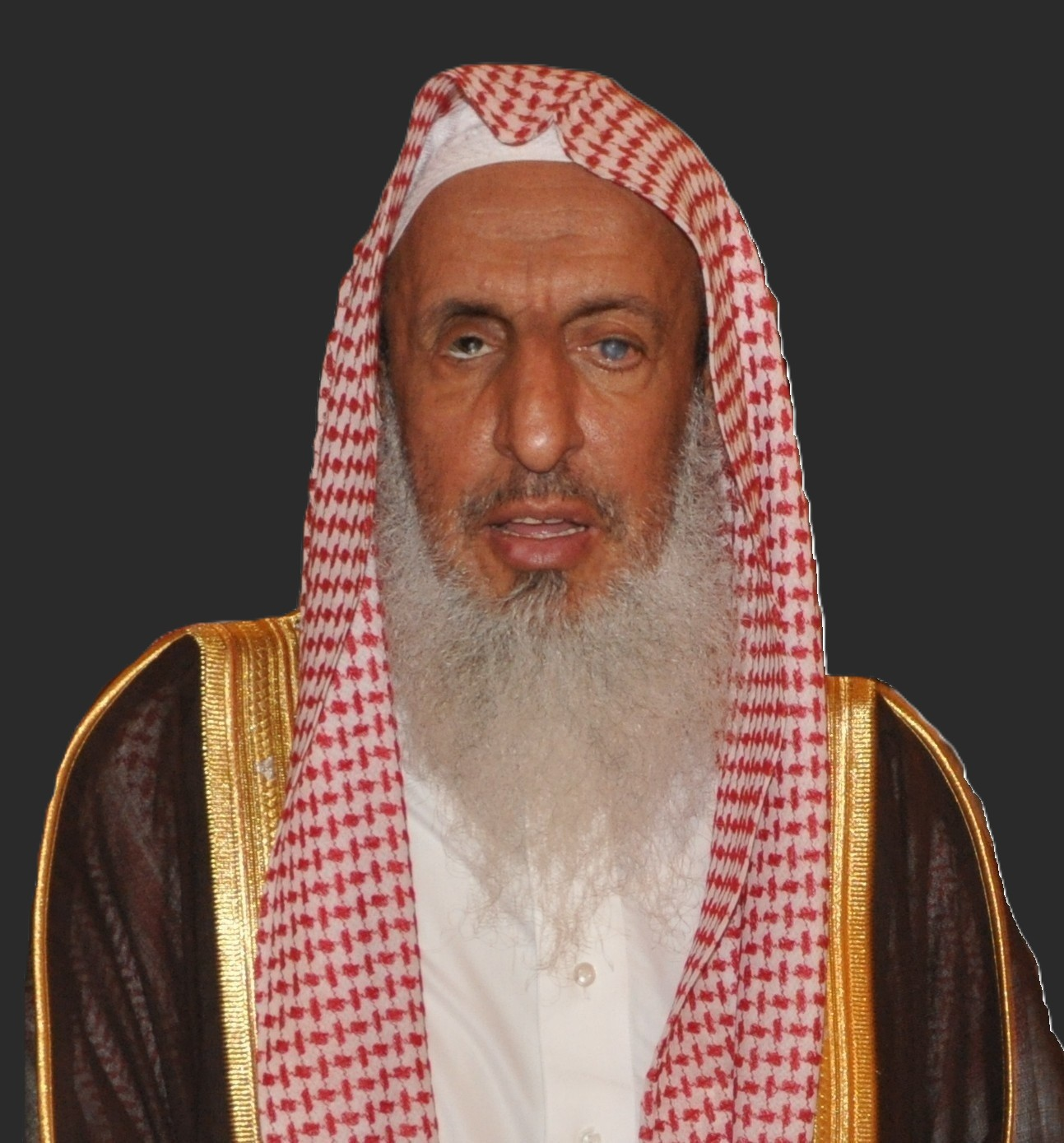
- Al al-Sheikh in 2012

Grand Mufti of Saudi Arabia
- In office 14 May 1999 – 23 September 2025
- Preceded by: Ibn Baz
- Succeeded by: Saleh al-Fawzan

Personal life
- Born: 30 November 1943 Mecca, Saudi Arabia
- Died: 23 September 2025 (aged 81) Riyadh, Saudi Arabia
- Education: Imam Muhammad ibn Saud University

Religious life
- Religion: Islam
- Denomination: Sunni
- Lineage: Al al-Sheikh family
- Jurisprudence: Hanbali
- Creed: Athari
- Movement: Salafism

Sheikh Abdulaziz bin Abdullah Al ash-Sheikh (Note: Arabic: عبد العزيز بن عبد الله آل الشيخ, romanized: ʿAbd al-ʿAzīz ibn ʿAbd Āllah Āl al-Shaykh) (30 November 1943 – 23 September 2025) was a Saudi Islamic scholar who served as the third Grand Mufti of Saudi Arabia from 1999 until his death in 2025.

As such he was head of the Council of Senior Religious Scholars and its sub-committee, the Permanent Committee for Islamic Research and Issuing Fatwas.

== Early life ==
Abdulaziz Al ash-Sheikh was born in Mecca, Saudi Arabia on 30 November 1943. He was a member of the Al al-Sheikh family. In 1951, his father died when he was eight years old. At the age of 20 in 1963, he lost his vision. In 1969–70, he assumed leadership at the Sheikh Muhammad bin Ibrahim Mosque in Dukhna, Riyadh. In 1979, he was appointed assistant professor at the College of Sharia, Mecca.

== Grand Mufti of Saudi Arabia ==
In 1995, he became the Deputy Grand Mufti, and in May 1999, King Fahd appointed Al al-Sheikh as Grand Mufti of Saudi Arabia, following the death of the previous Grand Mufti Abdulaziz bin Baz.

=== Proclamations ===
In 2001, the Grand Mufti issued a fatwa banning Pokemon in Saudi Arabia on the basis that it promotes gambling and that the cards contain symbols resembling "the star of David, which everyone knows is connected to international Zionism and is Israel's national emblem". He also claimed that other symbols on the cards promoted Freemasonry and Christianity. As a result of this edict, Pokemon products were removed from shops in Saudi Arabia and customs officers began preventing them from entering the country.

In 2006, following Pope Benedict XVI's quotation of a Byzantine emperor in a lecture, the Grand Mufti called the Pope's statement "lies", adding that they "show that reconciliation between religions is impossible".

In 2007, the Grand Mufti announced plans to demolish the Green Dome and flatten the dome.

On 15 March 2012, the Grand Mufti declared that, "All churches in the Arabian Peninsula must be destroyed". This declaration caused criticism from some Christian officeholders. Roman Catholic bishops in Germany and Austria responded sharply to his fatwa, concerned about the human rights of non-Muslims working in the Persian Gulf region. Russian Orthodox Metropolitan Mark, Archbishop of Yegoryevsk, said the ruling was "alarming". Most of the world overlooked the statement. Mehmet Görmez, the most senior imam in Turkey, blasted Al al-Sheikh's call to "destroy all the churches" in the Persian Gulf region, saying that the announcement totally contradicted the peaceful teachings of Islam. Görmez, the president of Diyanet İşleri Başkanlığı (Presidency of Religious Affairs), said he could not accept Al al-Sheikh's fatwa, adding that it ran contrary to the centuries-old Islamic teachings of tolerance and the sanctity of institutions belonging to other religions.

In April 2012, the Grand Mufti issued a fatwa allowing ten-year-old girls to marry, insisting that girls are ready for marriage by age 10 or 12: "Our mothers and grandmothers got married when they were barely 12. Good upbringing makes a girl ready to perform all marital duties at that age."

In June 2013, Al al-Sheikh issued a fatwa demanding the destruction of statues of horses placed in a roundabout in Jizan: "The sculptures [must] be removed because they are a great sin and are prohibited under Sharia".

The Grand Mufti issued a fatwa on 12 September 2013 that suicide bombings are "great crimes" and bombers are "criminals who rush themselves to hell by their actions". He described suicide bombers as "robbed of their minds... who have been used (as tools) to destroy themselves and societies."

In late August 2014, the Grand Mufti condemned the Islamic State of Iraq and the Levant and al-Qaeda saying, "Extremist and militant ideas and terrorism which spread decay on Earth, destroying human civilisation, are not in any way part of Islam, but are enemy number one of Islam, and Muslims are their first victims".

On 25 September 2015, one day after the Mina crush disaster which (according to the Associated Press) killed at least 1,399 foreign Muslims performing Hajj, Al al-Sheikh publicly told Muhammad bin Nayef, then-Crown Prince of Saudi Arabia, that he was "not responsible for what happened", and "as for the things that humans cannot control, you are not blamed for them. Fate and destiny are inevitable." Prince Muhammad was also the country's interior minister, responsible for safety in Mecca, and the Grand Mufti's words immunized the Crown Prince from possible public criticism within Saudi Arabia, which set the official death toll for the Mina tragedy at fewer than 800 deaths.

In January 2016, while answering a question on a television show in which he issues fatwas in response to viewers' queries on everyday religious matters, Al al-Sheikh ruled that chess was forbidden in Islam because it constituted gambling, was a waste of time and money and a cause of hatred and enmity between the players.

In September 2016, the Grand Mufti ruled that the Iranian Leadership is not Muslim and is the "son of the magi".

In 2017, the Grand Mufti was on a list of religious scholars included on a death list by ISIS.

in 2018, he was reported to have backed the decision allowing women to drive.

== Death ==
Abdulaziz Al al-Sheikh died in Riyadh on 23 September 2025, at the age of 81. His funeral prayer was held at Imam Turki bin Abdullah Grand Mosque in Riyadh. Absentia funeral prayers were also held in Masjid al-Haram in Mecca, led by Bandar Baleela, and in the Prophet's Mosque in Medina, led by Ali al-Hudhayfi, as well as in all Mosques across Saudi Arabia by order of King Salman bin Abdulaziz. The UAE Fatwa Council, through its chairman Abdullah ibn Bayyah, expressed condolences following his death.

== Notes ==
Religious titles
Preceded by Abdulaziz Bin Baz	Grand Mufti of Saudi Arabia; 1999–2025	Succeeded by Salih al-Fawzan
