= Al-Uthaymin =

Saudi Islamic scholar (1929–2001)

Sheikh Muhammad ibn Sāliḥ al-Uthaymin
- محمد بن صالح العثيمين
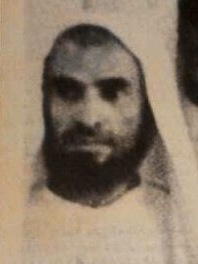
- Ibn Uthaymin in 1968
- Title: Al-Faqih

Personal life
- Born: Muhammad ibn Sāliḥ al-Uthaymin (27th of Ramadan) March 9, 1929 Unaizah, Sultanate of Nejd
- Died: January 10, 2001 (aged 71) Jeddah, Saudi Arabia
- Resting place: Mecca, Saudi Arabia
- Children: 7
- Era: 20th century
- Region: Arabian Peninsula
- Occupation: Islamic scholar; professor; author
- Website: binothaimeen.net

Religious life
- Religion: Islam
- Denomination: Sunni
- Institute: Imam Mohammad Ibn Saud Islamic University (professor)
- Lineage: Banu Tamim
- Jurisprudence: Hanbali
- Creed: Athari
- Movement: Salafism

Muslim leader
- Influenced by: Ibn Qudama, Ibn Taymiyya, Ibn al-Qayyim, Ibn Muflih, Muhammad ibn Abd al-Wahhab, Abdul-Rahman al-Sa'di, Abd al-Aziz ibn Baz
- Influenced: Saleh al-Luhaydan, Saleh al-Fawzan, Abdur-Razzaq al-Badr, Zahran Alloush
- Awards: King Faisal International Prize (for Service to Islam; February 8, 1994)

Muhammad ibn Sāliḥ al-Uthaymin (Arabic: محمد بن صالح العثيمين, romanized: Muḥammad ibn Sāliḥ al-'Uthaymīn; 9 March 1929 – 10 January 2001), commonly known by his laqab Ibn Uthaymin (Arabic: ابن عثيمين, romanized: Ibn ʿUthaymīn), sometimes spelt Ibn Uthaymeen or al-Uthaymeen, was a Saudi Islamic scholar.

== Family background and birth ==
Ibn Uthaymin was born during the 27th night of Ramadan in the year of 1347 Hijri. The 27th night of Ramadan is believed by Muslims to be a potential night for Laytul Qadr, ("The Night of Decree") upon which the Qur'an was first revealed to the Prophet Muhammad, and has since been seen as a significant night. The 27th of Ramadan in 1347 Hijri is the 9th March, 1929 in the Gregorian calendar.

Ibn Uthaymin was born to Salih bin Muhammad Al-Uthaymin in the town of Unayzah of the Qaseem Region of the Najd Province. His family belonged to the well-known Banu Tamim tribe, Al-'Uthaymin's lineage is known as being; Muhammad bin Salih bin Muhammad bin Sulayman bin Abdurrahman bin Uthman bin Abdullah bin Abdurrahmaan bin Ahmad bin Muqbil. His ancestor Ahmad bin Muqbil Al-Tamimi was from the Wahabah sub-tribe of the Banu Tamim. His surname Al-Uthaymin is derived from his great-great-great-grandfather Uthman bin Abdullah who was known by the nickname Uthaymin, meaning little Uthman. The Al-Uthaymin family was famous in the area for its scholarship in religious affairs. His upbringing and early life is described as being righteous and aligned with Islamic morals.

Ibn Uthaymin's son Abdullah had said that once his great-grandfather Muhammad bin Sulayman had a dream in which he met the renowned Hanbali scholar Ibn Taymiyyah in a market near an area of assembly of the people of Unayzah. In this interaction Ibn Taymiyyah had handed over to him a lamp. Muhammad bin Sulayman thus went on to enquire about the meaning of this dream from scholars who were skilled in the realm of dream interpretation. These scholars then told him that he would have a child who would be salih, meaning pious, and would have an elevated position when it comes to the knowledge of the religion. Thus Muhammad named his next born son Salih. Salih was known to be pious but not a student of knowledge, but Salih's son Muhammad bin Salih Al-Uthaymin was a scholar of Islam. It has been said, however, that this story has no historical value.

== Education ==
After completing his memorization of the Qur'an and foundational studies, he began his full-time religious studies under Muhammad ibn 'Abd al-'Aziz al-Mutawwa' and Ali al-Salihi in Unayzah, the two teachers that 'Abd al-Rahman al-Sa'di had appointed to instruct beginning students. After one year of studying under those two teachers, al-Uthaymeen began studying under 'Abd al-Rahman al-Sa'di in 1945 and continued to be his student until al-Sa'di's death. In 1952, al-Salihi advised Ibn Uthaymin to enroll in the newly opened Ma'had al-'Ilmi in Riyadh, which he did after seeking permission from al-Sa'di. While there, he studied under Ibn Baz, among others. He studied there for two years before returning to Unayzah, where began teaching and continued his studies under al-Sa'di.

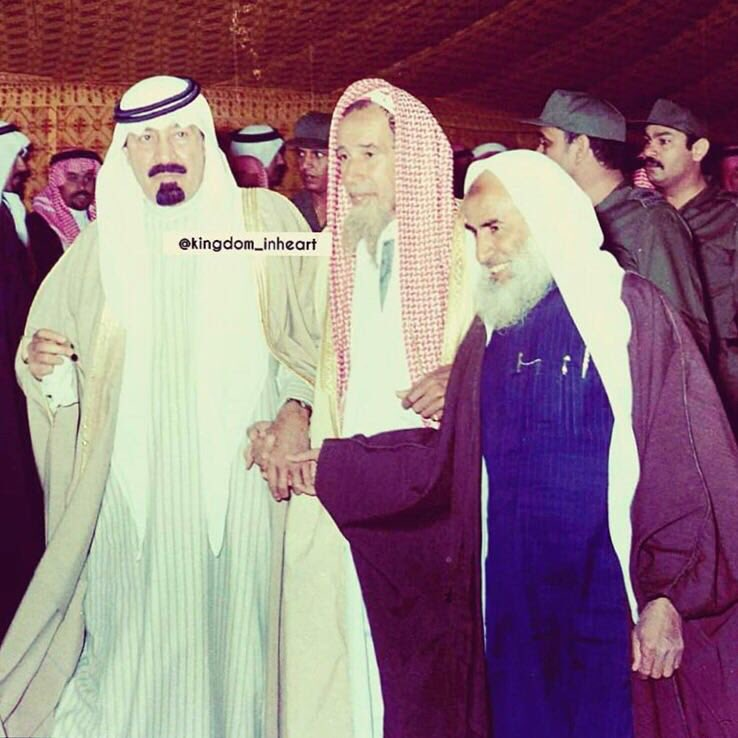
From the left: King Abdullah, Saleh bin Ahmed Al-Khuraysi with al-Uthaymeen.

== Theology ==
In his understanding of God, Ibn Uthaymin rejects allegorical interpretations of Quranic descriptions of God, affirming them in their “literal” sense (haqiqatan) and attributing characteristics such as hands, fingers, a face, eyes, and feet to God. While he denies that these attributes are identical to human attributes, he maintains that some degree of resemblance (nawʿ tashābuh) between God and His creation exists.

He also does not conceive of God as wholly transcendent of forms, arguing that His attributes possess particular modalities (kayfiyya) and that His form and actions are determinate. For example, according to Ibn Uthaymin, God has a form for his hand or a color for his eyes. However, because God has not been observed and revelation does not specify His appearance, Ibn Uthaymin maintains that the precise nature of these attributes remains unknown. Consequently, his position affirms real divine attributes and some resemblance between God and creation while denying that humans know their exact nature, giving rise to an unknown yet anthropomorphic conception of God.

He states:

They (the revealed attributes) are equivalents of the eponymous body parts of humans, such as the hand, face, eye, feet, and fingers... . However regarding humans they constitute (body) parts and pieces.

Regarding God, though, we do not speak of parts and pieces. A statement that God consists of parts and pieces is neither stated nor negated in revelation. Therefore we answer to someone who says that God is one who cannot be divided in pieces, that this statement is a forbidden innovation. There is no evidence to describe God with such a negation. And you are not more knowledgeable about God than God himself, or His Prophet, or the Prophet's Companions. None of them ever stated that God cannot be divided into pieces.

However we neither say that they (the essential attributes) are parts and pieces. We simply refrain from using such terms. But they are the eponymous body parts of humans, that can be separated from the whole. Regarding God, however, this is not conceivable, i.e. that the attribute 'Hand' which God has attributed to himself, can vanish. God has attributed Himself with them forever and ever. This is why we do not refer to them as parts and pieces.

== The four levels of spiritual response to a calamity ==
Ibn Uthaymin's theory on the four levels of spiritual response to a calamity is outlined below:

- Level One: Discontentment
- Level Two: Patience
- Level Three: Acceptance
- Level Four: Gratitude

== Publications ==
- The Beautiful Names and Attributes of Allah: The Beautiful Names and Attributes of Allah.
- The Creed of the Ahlus-Sunnah Wal Jama'ah, Translated by Abu Nasir Ibrahim Abdur-Rauf.
- How to Perform the Rituals of Hajj, Umrah and Visiting the Prophet’s Masjid.
- Guidance For Fasting Muslims.
- Fatawa Arkan-ul-Islam.
- Explanation of Summary of Hamaweyyah Creed.
- What You Must Believe about Your Creator.
- Rights and Duties in Islam.
- A Study on Ablution, Bathing, Dry Ablution (Tayammum) and Prayer.
- How Do We Believe in the Last Day?
- The Ruling on Abandoning The Prayer

== Death ==
Muhammad ibn Saleh al-Uthaymin died on 10 January 2001, aged 71 at King Faisal Specialist Hospital in Jeddah due to a prolonged illness.
