= Ibn Baz =

Saudi Islamic scholar (1912–1999)

- ابن باز

Grand Mufti of Saudi Arabia
- In office 1993 – 13 May 1999
- Monarch: King Fahd
- Preceded by: Muhammad ibn Ibrahim Al ash-Sheikh
- Succeeded by: Abdulaziz Al al-Sheikh

Personal life
- Born: Abdulaziz ibn Abdullah Al Baz; 21 November 1912 Riyadh, Emirate of Riyadh (present day Saudi Arabia)
- Died: 13 May 1999 (aged 86) Taif, Saudi Arabia
- Resting place: Al Adl cemetery, Mecca
- Children: Ahmad; Abd Allah; Abd al-Rahman; Khalid
- Parent: Abd Allah ibn Abd al-Rahman (father)
- Era: Modern
- Region: Middle East
- Website: https://binbaz.org.sa/

Religious life
- Religion: Islam
- Denomination: Sunni
- Jurisprudence: Hanbali
- Creed: Athari
- Movement: Salafism

Muslim leader
- Teacher: Muhammad ibn Ibrahim Al ash-Sheikh; Abd al-Haqq al-Hashimi
- Influenced by: Ahmad ibn Hanbal; Taqi al-Din ibn Taymiyya; Ibn Qayyim al-Jawziyya; Muhammad ibn Abd al-Wahhab; Muhammad al-Amin al-Shinqiti; Badi' al-Din al-Sindi
- Influenced: Saleh al-Fawzan; Abu Abd al-Rahman Ibn Aqil al-Zahiri; Muhammad Abd al-Qayyum; Uthman al-Khamis; Nasir ibn Musfir al-Zahrani; Muhammad Hisham al-Tahiri; Zahran Alloush
- Awards: National Order of Merit of Mauritania; King Faisal International Prize for Service to Islam

Abdulaziz ibn Abdullah Al Baz (Arabic: عبد العزيز بن عبد الله آل باز, romanized: ʿAbd al-ʿAzīz ibn ʿAbd Allāh Āl Bāz; 21 November 1912 – 13 May 1999), simply known as Ibn Baz, was a Saudi Islamic scholar who served as the second Grand Mufti of Saudi Arabia from 1993 until his death in 1999.

Ibn Baz issued a fatwa authorising a wealth tax to support the mujahideen during the Soviet-Afghan War. His endorsement of In Defence of Muslim Lands, principally written by Abdullah Azzam, was a powerful influence in the successful call for jihad against the Soviet Union. It is said to be the first official call for jihad by a nation state against another nation state in modern times.

== Early life ==
Ibn Baz was born in the city of Riyadh during the month of Dhu al-Hijjah in 1912 to a family with a reputation for their interest in Islam. His father died when he was three years old. By the time he was thirteen, he had begun working, selling clothing with his brother in a market. He also took lessons in the Qur'an, hadith, fiqh, and tafsir, with the man who would precede him as the country's top religious official, Muhammad ibn Ibrahim Al ash-Sheikh.

In 1927, when he was sixteen, he started losing his eyesight after a serious infection in his eyes. By the time he was twenty, he had totally lost his sight and had become blind. At that time, Saudi Arabia lacked a modern university system. Ibn Baz received a traditional education in Islamic literature with Islamic scholars.

== Career ==
He held a number of posts and responsibilities, such as:

- Judge of Al Kharj district upon the recommendation of Muhammad ibn 'Abdul-Lateef Al ash-Shaikh from 1938 to 1951.
- In 1992 he was appointed Grand Mufti of Saudi Arabia and Head of the Council of Senior Scholars and was granted presidency of the administration for Permanent Committee for Scholarly Research and Ifta.
- President and member of the Constituent Assembly of the Muslim World League.

In 1981 he was awarded the King Faisal International Prize for Service to Islam. Prior to the appointment of Salih al-Fawzan, he was the only Grand Mufti of Saudi Arabia not to come from the Al ash-Sheikh family.

Ibn Baz wrote more than sixty works over the course of his career on subjects including the hadith, tafsir, Islamic inheritance jurisprudence, Tawheed, fiqh, salat, zakat, dawah, Hajj and Umrah.

He also authored a criticism of the concept of nationhood.

=== Activism ===
Ibn Baz had undertaken a number of charitable and similar activities such as:

- His support for dawah organisations and Islamic centres in many parts of the world.
- The popular radio program, Nurun Ala Darb ("light on the path"), in which he discussed current issues and answered questions from listeners as well as providing fatwa if needed.
- Ibn Baz urged donations be given to the Taliban in Afghanistan, who in the late 1990s were seen by many Saudis as "pure, young Salafi warriors" fighting against destructive warlords.
- Ibn Baz issued fatwas against the Soviets.

Ibn Baz was a prolific speaker, both in public and privately at his mosque. He also used to invite people after Isha prayer to share a meal with him.

Ibn Baz was among the Muslim scholars who opposed regime change using violence. He called for obedience to the people in power unless they ordered something that went against God.

During his career as the Grand Mufti of Saudi Arabia, he attempted to both legitimise the rule of the ruling family and to support calls for the reform of Islam in line with Salafi ideals. Many criticised him for supporting the Saudi government when, after the Persian Gulf War, it muzzled or imprisoned those regarded as too critical of the government, such as Safar al-Hawali and Salman al-Ouda. His influence on the Salafi movement was large, and most of the current prominent judges and religious scholars in Saudi Arabia are his former students.

== Personal life ==
His wives and children lived in the Shumaysi neighbourhood of Riyadh in a little cluster of modern two-story buildings. Like all senior Saudi clerics, his home was a gift from a wealthy benefactor or a religious foundation for his distinguished religious work.

== Death ==
On Thursday morning, 13 May 1999, Ibn Baz died at the age of 86 due to heart failure. He was buried in al-Adl cemetery, Mecca.

King Fahd issued a decree appointing Abdulaziz Al al-Sheikh as the new Grand Mufti on May 14th 1999.

== Controversies ==
His obituary in The Independent said "His views and fatwas were controversial, condemned by militants, liberals and progressives alike". He was also criticised by hardline Salafi jihadists for supporting the decision to permit U.S. troops to be stationed in Saudi Arabia in 1991.

=== Cosmology ===
In 1966, when Ibn Baz was vice-president of the Islamic University of Medina, he wrote an article denouncing Riyadh University for teaching the "falsehood" that the Earth rotates and orbits the Sun. In his article, Ibn Baz claimed that the Sun orbited the Earth, and that "the Earth is fixed and stable, spread out by God for mankind and made a bed and cradle for them, fixed down by mountains lest it shake". As a result of the publication of his first article, Ibn Baz was ridiculed by Egyptian journalists as an example of Saudi primitiveness, and King Faisal was reportedly so displeased by the first article that he ordered the destruction of every unsold copy of the two papers that had published it. In 1982 Ibn Baz published a book, Al-adilla al-naqliyya wa al-ḥissiyya ʿala imkān al-ṣuʾūd ila al-kawākib wa ʾala jarayān al-shams wa al-qamar wa sukūn al-arḍ ("Treatise on the textual and rational proofs of the rotation of the Sun and the motionlessness of the Earth and the possibility of ascension to other planets"). In it, he republished the 1966 article, together with a second article on the same subject written later in 1966, and repeated his belief that the Sun orbited the Earth. In 1985, he changed his mind concerning the rotation of the Earth, when Prince Sultan bin Salman returned home after a week aboard the Space Shuttle Discovery to tell him that he had seen the Earth rotate.

In addition, there was controversy concerning the nature of the takfir, which, it was claimed, Ibn Baz had pronounced. According to Malise Ruthven, he threatened all who did not accept his "pre-Copernican" views with a fatwa, declaring them infidels. Ibn Baz wrote a letter to a magazine in 1966 responding to similar accusations:

I only deemed it lawful to kill whoever claims that the Sun is static (thābita la jāriya) and refuses to repent of this after clarification. This is because denying the circulation of the Sun constitutes a denial of Allah (Glorified be He), His Great Book, and His Honourable Messenger (Peace and blessings be upon him). It is well established in the Deen (religion of Islam) by way of decisive evidence and Ijma' (consensus) of scholars that whoever denies Allah, His Messenger or His Book is a Kafir (disbeliever), and their blood and wealth become violable. It is the duty of the responsible authority to ask them to repent of this; either they repent or be executed. Thanks to Allah that this issue is not debatable among scholars.

Ibn Baz's second article written in 1966 also responded to similar accusations:

I did not declare those who believe that the Earth rotates to be infidels, nor those who believe that the Sun moving around itself, but I do so for those who say that the Sun is static and does not move (thābita la jāriya), which is in my last article. Whoever says so being an infidel is obvious from the Quran and the Sunnah, because God almighty says: 'And the Sun runs on (tajri) to a term appointed for it' ... As for saying that the Sun is fixed in one position but still moving around itself, ..., I did not deal with this issue in my first article, nor have I declared as infidel anyone who says so. Western writers subsequently have drawn parallels between their perception of Ibn Baz and the trial of Galileo by the Catholic Church in the 16th century.

Ibn Baz is often said to have believed that the Earth was flat. Author Robert Lacey says that Ibn Baz gave an interview "in which he mused on how we operate day to day on the basis that the ground beneath us is flat ... and it led him to the belief that he was not afraid to voice and for which he became notorious." Though satirised for his belief, "the sheikh was unrepentant. If Muslims chose to believe the world was round, that was their business, he said, and he would not quarrel with them religiously. But he was inclined to trust what he felt beneath his feet rather than the statements of scientists he did not know." According to Lacey, Ibn Baz changed his mind about the Earth's rotation after talking to Prince Sultan bin Salman Al Saud who had spent time in a space shuttle flight in 1985.

However, Malise Ruthven and others state that it is incorrect to report that Ibn Baz believed "the Earth is flat". Professor Werner Ende, a German expert on Ibn Baz's fatwas, states he has never asserted this. Abd al-Wahhâb al-Turayrî calls those that attribute the flat earth view to Ibn Baz "rumour mongers". He points out that Ibn Baz issued a fatwa declaring that the Earth is round, and, indeed, in 1966 Ibn Baz wrote "The quotation I cited [in his original article] from the speech of the great scholar Ibn Al-Qayyim includes proof that the Earth is round."

Lacey quotes a fatwa by Ibn Baz urging caution towards claims that the Americans had landed on the Moon. "We must make careful checks whenever the kuffar [unbelievers] or faasiqoon [immoral folk] tell us something: we cannot believe or disbelieve them until we get sufficient proof on which the Muslims can depend."

=== Grand Mosque takeover ===
Ibn Baz has been associated with some members of the 20 November – 4 December 1979 takeover of the Grand Mosque (Masjid al-Haram) in Mecca. The two-week-long armed takeover left over 250 dead, including hostages taken by the militants. According to interviews taken by author Robert Lacey, the militants, led by Juhayman al-Otaybi, were known as Al-Ikhwan (named after the Ikhwan army in which Juhayman's father served or the hostel, Beit al-Ikhwan, in which Juhayman lived). Al-Ikhwan were former students of Ibn Baz and other high ulama under the Al-Jama'a Al-Salafiya Al-Muhtasiba (literally, the Salafi Group that Commands Right and Forbids Wrong"), before breaking off from the group due to their extremism and militantism. Juhayman declared his brother-in-law, Mohammed al-Qahtani, to be the Mahdi. The Mabahith of the Minister of Interior, Prince Nayef bin Abdulaziz Al Saud, had identified Mohammed al-Qahtani and a number of the Ikhwan as troublemakers. They had them imprisoned months before—only to release them at the request of Sheikh Ibn Baz.

Islam forbids any violence within the Grand Mosque. Ibn Baz found himself in a delicate situation, especially as he had previously taught al-Otaybi in Medina. The situation was compounded and complicated by the fact that the Saudi Government found itself unprepared and incapable of dislodging the militants from the Mosque. They asked for outside assistance from the French GIGN and Pakistani SSG. Non-Muslims are not permitted within the Meccan city limits, let alone the Grand Mosque.

When asked for a fatwa by the Government to condemn the militants, the language of Ibn Baz and other senior ulama "was curiously restrained". The invaders of the Masjid al-Haram were not declared non-Muslims, despite their killings and violation of the sanctity of the Masjid, but only called "al-jamaah al-musallahah" (the armed group). Regardless, the ulama issued a fatwa allowing deadly force to be used in retaking the mosque. The senior scholars also insisted that before security forces attack them, the authorities must offer the option "to surrender and lay down their arms".

=== Women's rights ===
Ibn Baz has been described as having inflexible attitudes towards women and being a bulwark against the expansion of rights for women. Commenting on the Sharia rule that the testimony in court of one woman was insufficient, Ibn Baz said: "The Prophet (Peace Be Upon Him) explained that their shortcoming in reasoning is found in the fact that their memory is weak and that their witness is in need of another woman to corroborate it." He also issued a fatwa against women driving cars, which in the West may have been his most well known ruling. He declared: "Depravity leads to the innocent and pure women being accused of indecencies. Allah (Arabic for God) has laid down one of the harshest punishments for such an act to protect society from the spreading of the causes of depravity. Women driving cars, however, is one of the causes that lead to that."

=== Persian Gulf War ===
During the Persian Gulf War Ibn Baz issued a fatwa allowing the deployment of non-Muslim troops on Saudi soil to defend the kingdom from the Iraqi army. Some noted that this was in contrast to his opinion in the 1940s when he contradicted the government policy of allowing non-Muslims to be employed on Saudi soil. However, according to The New York Times, his fatwa overruled more radical clerics/scholars. In response to criticism, Ibn Baz condemned those who "whisper secretly in their meetings and record their poison over cassettes distributed to the people".

=== Criticism of Osama bin Laden ===
According to his obituary in The Independent, Ibn Baz held ultra-conservative views and strongly maintained the puritan and non-compromising traditions of Wahhabism. However, his political views were not strict enough for Osama bin Laden who condemned Ibn Baz for "his weakness and flexibility and the ease of influencing him with the various means which the interior ministry practices". Ibn Baz was the subject of Osama bin Laden's first public pronouncement intended for the general Muslim public. This little open letter condescendingly criticised him for endorsing the Oslo peace accord between the PLO and Israeli government. Ibn Baz defended his decision to endorse the Oslo Accords by citing the Treaty of Hudaybiyyah, saying that a peace treaty with non-Muslims has historical precedent if it can avoid the loss of life.

Ibn Baz deemed it mandatory to destroy media that promoted Bin Laden's views, and declared that it was forbidden for anyone to co-operate with him. He wrote:

...It is obligatory to destroy and annihilate these publications that have emanated from al-Faqeeh, or from al-Mas'aree, or from others of the callers of falsehood (bin Laden and those like him), and not to be lenient towards them. And it is obligatory to advise them, to guide them towards the truth, and to warn them against this falsehood. It is not permissible for anyone to co-operate with them in this evil. And it is obligatory upon them to be sincere and to come back to guidance and to leave alone and abandon this falsehood. So my advice to al-Mas'aree, al-Faqeeh and Bin Laden and all those who traverse their ways is to leave alone this disastrous path, and to fear Allah and to beware of His vengeance and His Anger, and to return to guidance and to repent to Allah for whatever has preceded from them. And Allah, Glorified, has promised His repentant servants that He will accept their repentance and be good to them. So Allah the Glorified said: "Say, 'O My servants who have transgressed against themselves. Do not despair of the Mercy of Allah; verily, Allah forgives all sins.' Truly, He is Oft-Forgiving, Most Merciful." [39:53].

== Works ==
- The Correct Islamic Aqeedah and what opposes it
- Important Lessons for Every Muslim
- Hajj, Umrah and Ziyarah
- The Prophet's Manner of Performing
- Essential Lessons For Every Muslim
- Words of Advice Regarding Da'wah
- Knowledge
- Treaties on Zakat & Fasting
- The Rule on Those Who Seek Help In Other Than Allah

== See also ==
- Muhammad ibn Abd al-Wahhab
- Muhammad ibn Ibrahim Al al-Sheikh
- Ibn Uthaymin
- Rabi' al-Madkhali
- Saleh al-Fawzan
- Abdulaziz Al al-Sheikh

Religious titles
Preceded by Muhammad ibn Ibrahim Al ash-Sheikh	Grand Mufti of Saudi Arabia; 1992–1999	Succeeded by Abdul-Azeez ibn Abdullaah Aal ash-Shaikh
