= Council of Senior Scholars (Saudi Arabia) =

Highest religious body in Saudi Arabia

- هيئة كبار العلماء
- Formation: August 29, 1972; 53 years ago
- Founder: King Faisal ibn Abd al-Aziz
- Legal status: Council
- Purpose: Advisory; religious authority; issuance of fatwas
- Headquarters: Riyadh
- Location: Saudi Arabia
- Official language: Arabic
- Headed by: Grand Mufti of Saudi Arabia

The Council of Senior Scholars (Arabic: هيئة كبار العلماء, romanized: Hay'at Kibar al-‘Ulama), also known as the Senior Council of Ulama, is the highest religious authority in Saudi Arabia, and serves as an advisory body to the king on religious matters. Members of the council is appointed by the king and receive salaries from the government. As of 2024, the council consists of 21 members.

King Fahd continued the practice established by his predecessors of meeting weekly with council members who residing in the capital, Riyadh. In 2010, King Abdullah decreed that only members of the Council and a select group of other Islamic scholars were authorized to issue fatwas in Saudi Arabia.

== History ==
Prior to 1971, the council met informally during the reign of king Faisal. On 29 August 1972 King Faisal issued a royal decree formally establishing the Council.

Initially, membership was limited to scholars of the Hanbali school of Islamic jurisprudence. In 2009, King Abdullah expanded the Council to include scholars from the other three Sunni schools of Islamic jurisprudence, Shafi'i, Hanafi and Maliki. Despite this broader representation, observers note that the council members continue to hold largely similar positions regarding 'Aqidah (creed), adhering to the Athari school of theology.

As of 2025, Salih al-Fawzan serves as the head of the council and the Grand Mufti of Saudi Arabia.

== Fatwas ==
The Senior Council assists in reviewing requests for fatwas prepared by the four (or five) member Permanent Committee for Islamic Research and Ifta, whose members are drawn from the Senior Council. The members of the Senior Council are appointed to four year terms. In 2010, King Abdullah decreed that only officially approved religious scholars would be allowed to issue fatwas in Saudi Arabia, primarily the members the Council of Senior Scholars. This decision led to the banning of at least one Islamic fatwa website, Islam-QA, operated by Syrian-born Palestinian-Saudi Islamic scholar Muhammad Al-Munajid.

In practice, the Senior Council and the Permanent Committee issue fatwas, imams communicate these rulings, and the Committee for the Promotion of Virtue and the Prevention of Vice is responsible for enforcing them.

== Ulama ==
While the terms ulama of Saudi Arabia and the Council of Senior Scholars are sometimes used interchangeably, they are not synonymous. Of the estimated 7,000 to 10,000 individuals who made up the ulama and their families in the 1990s, a number that may have reached around 20,000 by 2011, according to Sherifa Zuhur only thirty to forty of the most senior scholars "exercised substantive political influence".

== Oversight ==
According to Simon Henderson, the Council of Senior Scholars is required to issue a fatwa of approval before a new king is formally crowned. However, the accessions of King Salman and Crown Prince Mohammed bin Salman suggest that the ulema's authority over the royal family is limited in practice. The Columbia World Dictionary of Islamism notes that, in theory, the Council's role is to advise the Saudi king and confirm his adherence to the Islamic principle of "absolute obedience" to Sharia, upon which the monarch's authority is based. In practice, however, the Council "virtually never expresses opposition to any proposal from the royal family."

== Support for monarchy ==
The Council has been described as providing religious support for certain government decisions. In 2011, it issued a fatwa prohibiting public demonstrations, describing them "deviant intellectual and partisan connections". The ruling stated that demonstrations and activities leading to "disunity and fragmentation of the nation" were not permissible under Sharia (Islamic law). It further emphasized that reform should be pursued through advice and counsel rather than through public petitions or statements, citing the chapter An-Nisa, verse 83 of the Quran in support.

The Council is rarely in opposition to government policy, and when disagreements occur, they are generally expressed through silence. Analysts differ on the extent of the Council's influence. Some believe that the government typically consults the Council before issuing legislation, while others contend that the government often acts independently and seeks religious approval afterward. According to Christopher Boucek, the influence of the Council and the broader religious establishment fluctuates depending on the perceived security of the royal family; when the monarchy feels more secure, it tends to exert greater control over religious authorities. Unlike many other groups of ulema, Saudi scholars do not possess independent sources of income, such as endowments or land, and are instead financially dependent on government through salaries.

In 1992, King Fahd reportedly pressured seven members of the Council of Senior Scholars to retire after they declined to sign a letter condemning conservative criticism of the Al Saud family. In 2009, another member, Saad al-Shithri, was compelled to resign following his opposition to gender mixing at the newly established King Abdullah University of Science and Technology, the first co-educational university in Saudi Arabia.

== See also ==
- College of Cardinals
- Islam in Saudi Arabia
- Wahhabi movement
- Assembly of Experts, a council of Islamic theologians
