= Development of Salafism after World War II =

Arab Salafi movement of early 20th century led by Syrian Salafi theologian Muhammad Rashid Rida (d. 1935 C.E/ 1354 A.H) championed various beliefs such as Pan-Islamism, anti-colonialism, revival of Athari theology based on the works of medieval theologian Ibn Taymiyya as well as rejection of partisanship to legal schools (mad'habs). After his death, Rida's ideas would later on be expanded by his disciples in varied ways. One such disciple, Abu Ya'la al Zawawi called for the creation of a committee of ulama to reconcile various Sunni legal mad'habs. The ultimate goal was the promotion of a single school of thought for all Muslims, “a pure ancestral madhhab [madhhaban salafiyyan mahdan], be it in creed or in worship and other religious practices.” Others such as Muhammad Munir al-Dimishqi would come to the defense of the mad'habs. He also condemned those who invited Muslims to act according to Qur'an and Sunnah alone without taqleed (imitation) or ittiba (following) of the 4 schools. Conveying his pro-madhab message, Munir asserted that taqleed (blind-following) is not dispensable for modern Muslims. Scholars like Mas'ud 'Alam al-Nadwi defined the Salafi movement in vague terms as "the movement of decisive revolution against stagnancy". Thus different notions of Salafi legal doctrines emerged amongst Rida's followers and competed for dominance. Some, like that of Munir remained marginal.

== Muhammad Nasir al-Din al-Albani ==
It was during this period (1920s and 1930s) that Muhammad Nasir al Din al-Albani (d. 1999 C.E/ 1420 A.H) would be influenced by the reformist, revivalist ideas of Rida as a young man in Syria. He would spend many hours in Maktabat Zahiriyya, the first public library in Syria founded by the early Salafi reformer Tahir al-Jaza'iri. Al-Jaza'iri as the director of Syria's first public library had used his position to advance the revival of the Medieval scholar, Ibn Taymiyya. Jaza'iri was also the teacher of Muhibb al-Din Khatib and a close friend of Jamal al-Din al-Qasimi. As a result of his constant reading of Al-Manar as well as his attendance of classes of Muhammad Bahjat al-Bitar (a disciple of both Rashid Rida and Al-Qasimi) Albani adhered to the Salafiyya Reform tradition by the age of twenty. From this tradition, Albani would become a staunch opponent of taqleed, rejecting adherence to the four canonical legal schools and calling for a renewal of Ijtihad. For enabling this renewal, Albani would champion the cause of Salafi reformists- headed by Rida - which was the critical re-evaluation of hadiths. Albani's approach, like the Indian Ahl-i-Hadith movement was in the footsteps of the Medieval Ahlul Hadith school. Albani's efforts would lead to a new-found enthusiasm and revival of the sciences of hadith across Islamic religious circles.

After the Second World War, Albani had become popular for his knowledge of hadith to the point that it began to worry the Syrian government who put him under surveillance by 1960. Known for his impressive command of hadith science, Albani was offered a teaching post in Islamic University of Medina. Albani differed with the Najdi ulema for being unacknowledged partisans of Hanbali mad'hab and stirred up a sharp controversy. However, the growing popularity of Albani prevented them from ridding him, until he wrote a treatise entitled "The Muslim Woman's Veil" (Hijab al-mar’a al-muslima) in which he advocated that women are not obliged to cover their faces. Following this, Albani's contract in the university was allowed to lapse in 1963, after which he left the country. Even though Albani taught for only a short time in Saudi Arabia his ideas had a very strong impact there. In the 1960s, there were sharp disputes between disciples of Albani, the hadith revivalists and partisans of a more traditional hadith concept in the Islamic University of Medina. By the 1970s, Albani's faction had gained ground at the institute. In 1971, a leading member of Al al-Shaikh published a magazine article about Muhammad ibn 'Abd al-Wahhab's life and doctrine wherein he wrote that lbn 'Abd al-Wahhab's followers preferred to be known as al-Salafiyyun. Thus in the 1970s, the Saudi religious establishment took a "Salafi" turn, embracing the Salafi label more actively and constructing a Salafi patrimony. By 1975, Saudi Arabia had finally granted Albani symbolic rehabilitation, making him a member of the High Council (al-Majlis al-A‘li) of the Islamic University of Medina.

== Contemporary era: Purist Salafism ==
As long as Rida was alive, the Salafiyya movement had broad unity and a common purpose. Although different Salafis emphasized different aspects of the broad reformist project, all of the factions coexisted and coalesced under the leadership of Rida, who channeled all the tendencies through ''Al-Manar'' and his scholarly involvement in public affairs. After Rida's death in 1935, the advocates of Salafiyya began to fragment and coalesced around four major movements—Modernism, Islamism, Purism and Jihadism— often competing for dominance and making rival claims to orthodoxy. Over the course of decades, most of the disciples of Rida drifted towards religious purism. Roughly a decade after Rida's death in Cairo, the epicenter of Salafiyya had moved nearer to Saudi Arabia. In a letter sent by the prominent Salafi scholar Muhammad Bahjat al-Bitar from Saudi Arabia in 1947, to the Moroccan scholar Taqi-ud-Din Al-Hilali - both former pupils of Rida - Al-Bitar would praise Ibn Saud for his contributions to Islamic revivalism and refer to him as "the leader of the Salafiyya"(imām al-daʿwa al-salafiyya). With their institutional capabilities, control of the Islamic holy cities, rejection of popular Sufism and official championing of the reformist cause, the political and religious authorities of Saudi Arabia, had attained credible prospects to claim the leadership of Salafiyya movement.

Eventually, out of all currents competing between Rida's successors, a Purist notion of Salafiyya supported by the Saudi ulema would emerge dominant. This came to be emphasized globally as the "Salafi Manhaj". Manhaj refers to the path or methodology by which Salafis live and implement their beliefs and Da'wa(call). This Manhaj was associated with the Syrian-Albanian Islamic scholar Muhammad Nasiruddin Al-Albani, considered as one of the leading authorities for Salafis globally. Alongside Albani, Muhammad ibn Salih al Uthaymeen and Ibn Baz became the main advocates of the Salafi Manhaj. The Salafi Manhaj was opposed to two other competing camps: 1) Jihadi-Salafism which was heavily influenced by the thought of Sayyid Qutb 2) Salafi-harakis, i.e., Activist Salafis or Islamists who advocated non-violent political activism in Muslim and non-Muslim countries. Starting from the 1980s, Purist Salafis would distinguish themselves from the emerging counter-currents. Toeing this line, contemporary Salafis portray Rashid Rida as a "true Salafi in the Taymiyyan and Wahhabi traditions".

== Differences from early 20th-century Arab Salafiyya ==
Contemporary Purist Salafism, widely known as "the Salafi Manhaj" emerged from the 1960s as an intellectual hybrid of three similar, yet distinct, religious reform traditions: the Wahhabi movement in Arabia, Ahl-i Hadith movement in India and Salafiyya movement in the Arab World of the late-19th and early 20th centuries. The person most responsible for this transformation was the Syrian Islamic scholar Muhammad Nasir al-Din al-Albani, who is considered to be the "spiritual father" of the Purist Salafi current and recognised by all contemporary Salafis as "the greatest hadith scholar of his generation". Albani's school of thought differed from his teachers of the Salafiyya tradition in three major ways:

- The Early Salafiyya headed by Rashid Rida had considered the critical re-evaluation of the hadith corpus as an important activity to facilitate the revival of the stagnant hadith sciences and Ijtihad. In a major break from his teachers, Albani would extend this evaluation to the whole body of hadith. However, early Salafis like Rashid Rida were averse to this; and believed that hadith mutawatir (hadiths transmitted through multiple chains), handed down from generation to generation, were strictly beyond criticism. Albani's approach would lead him to go as far as classifying certain hadiths in the canonical collections of Bukhari and Muslim, as weak(da'if).
- Although Albani embraced Salafi principles on the condemnation of Taqlid, he went far beyond the early Salafiyya in their approach to Fiqh, and categorically condemned adherence to the four canonical legal schools(mad'habs). For the early Salafis, Fiqh and its principles(Usul al-Fiqh), played a major role in their exercise of Ijtihad. Thus, while they engaged in technical evaluation of the isnad( hadith transmission chains); they were open to rational analysis of the matn(text) of the hadith itself. For Albani, only the isnad are subject to technical critique; while the matn should be interpreted literally. He placed the "science of hadith"(ilm al-hadith) at the apex of religious sciences; viewing traditional legal jurisprudence(Fiqh) as merely an addendum to the Fiqh al-hadith(i.e., hadith studies). However, Fiqh al-hadith should be shielded from human reasoning and therefore; the critique of hadith texts is to be limited to linguistics and grammar. Thus, in advocating Ijtihad, Albani greatly reduced the scope of human reason in the legal process of Fiqh.
- Albani also inherited orthodox salafi doctrines in creed and religious practices from his teachers. However, he was far more hostile to other Islamic theological schools, unlike the previous Salafis. Consequently, the contemporary Salafi Purists who follow Albani's thought are far more averse to the pan-Islamist activism of early Salafiyya and their quests for a single, united Ummah under a World Caliphate.

== See also ==
- Salafi movement
- Sayyid Rashid Rida
- Ibn Taymiyya
- Muhammad Nasir al-Din al-Albani
- Salafi Quietism
