= Syed Sultan Ali Mosque =

Historical Sufi complex in Baghdad, Iraq

- جامع سيد سلطان علي
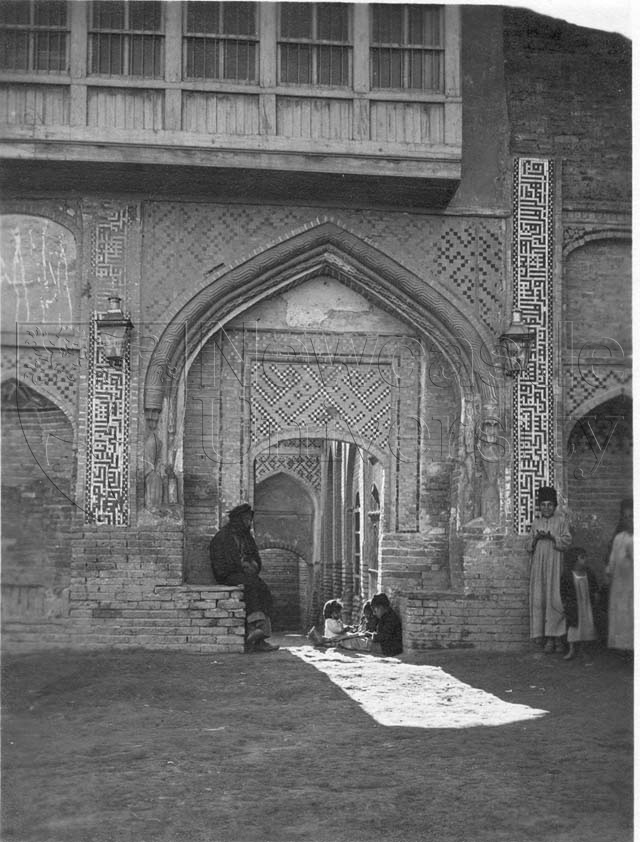
- The mosque in 1918

- Location of the mosque in Baghdad

Religion
- Affiliation: Sunni Islam
- Ecclesiastical or organizational status: Mosque and shrine
- Status: Active

Location
- Location: Al-Rashid Street, Rusafa, Baghdad
- Country: Iraq
- Interactive map of Syed Sultan Ali Mosque
- Administration: Descendants of Ibrahim al-Rawi
- Coordinates: 33°19′57″N 44°23′54″E

Architecture
- Type: Mosque architecture
- Style: Ottoman
- Founder: Kemankeş Kara Ali Pasha
- Completed: 1590 CE (reconstruction); 1892 (renovations); 2001

Specifications
- Capacity: 1,000 worshipers
- Interior area: 600 m^{2} (6,500 sq ft)
- Dome: Seven
- Minaret: One
- Site area: 1,000 m^{2} (11,000 sq ft)
- Shrine: One: Sayyid Sultan Ali (disputed)
- Materials: Bricks

The Sayyid Sultan Ali Mosque (Arabic: جامع سيد سلطان علي) is a historical mosque, madrasa, and mausoleum, located on al-Rashid Street, in the southern part of the historical area of al-Rusafa, in Baghdad, in the Baghdad Governorate of Iraq. It is among the cultural heritage properties of the city. The mosque acts as the headquarters for the Sufi Rifa'i Order in Baghdad, and has been home to two madrasas historically.

It is named for Sayyid Sultan Ali, a mysterious figure entombed within the mosque whose identity has been disputed amongst historians. Although he's believed to be the father of Ahmad al-Rifa'i, founder of the Rifa'iyya. The present mosque is a 16th-century construction, and has been restored several times. Today, the mosque us taken care of by the Baghdadi Rifa'i family of al-Rawas.

== Historical background ==
=== Origin and establishment ===
The exact origins of the mosque are not known. Local folklore and legends cite the origin of the mosque as having formerly been the house of the father (or grandfather) of Ahmad al-Rifa'i, Sayyid Sultan Ali, who was buried in it upon his passing. The Iraqi historian Muhammad Bahjat 'Athari says that the mosque was built over the grave of Sultan Ali ibn Ismail, the scholarly grandson of Ja'far al-Sadiq.

The details of the story, according to Sufi Iraqi historian Sayyid Mi'ad Sharaf al-Din, are as follows: Sayyid Sultan Ali, his nasab being Sayyid Sultan Ali ibn Yahya ibn Thabat ibn Hazim ibn Ahmad ibn al-Hasan al-Husayni. He was born in Basra around the Hijri year of 459, was a science student, and married Fatima al-Ansariyya, with whom he had a son, Ahmad al-Rifa'i. Around 519 AH, he came to the Abbasid Caliph al-Mustarshid to advise him against the Batiniyya. Still, the Caliph ignored his advice, causing the Sayyid to leave in anger. Around that time, he stayed in a house that belonged to an Abbasid prince named Malik ibn al-Musayyab. At home, he got a fever and passed away. The prince, who held the Sayyid in high regard, requested that he be buried in his house. Ever since, the tomb was visited by locals and grew to a mosque.

Due to the mosque's connection with Ahmad al-Rifa'i and the alleged tomb of his father, the Rifa'i Order took the complex as the headquarters of the Order in Baghdad. The mosque's minaret is theorized to originate from the era of the Jalayirid Sultanate. This is in part due to the minaret's striking similarities to that of the minaret of the Murjan Mosque. A mosque that the Jalayirids built. Thus, it is theorized that the mosque may also date back to the same era as the Jalayirid mosques.

=== Establishments within the mosque ===
==== The first Madrasa ====
The mosque was reconstructed by Kemankeş Kara Ali Pasha in 1590 CE, during the Ottoman period. The Shari'a Judicial Council of Baghdad hired a Qadi by the name of Muhammad Abd al-Baqi bin al-Mawla Abd al-Fattah to oversee a madrasa located adjacent to the mosque that overlooked the Tigris River in al-Murabba'a neighbourhood. The first madrasa was established by Kara Ali Pasha, and Abd al-Fattah established a waqf in 1692 CE that endowed some of his properties and the madrasa's needs. The students, some foreign, studied five parts of the Qu'ran a day. A fifth of the funds were given to the teachers, while the rest were spent on the students' needs. As a result, the mosque contained a small library for the students.

A second waqf was established in the mosque by Qadi Muhammad Hilmi Effendi, who endowed many places located east of the Shrine of Salman the Persian. These lands were bought from a man named Mahmud Effendi and were known as the Za'faraniyya lands. This led to the waqf registering in the mosque and spending its funding to support the students. The Waqf was recorded as official on 19 March 1695, by the Ottoman Empire. A third was registered on 8 December 1755 by several Baghdadi Qadis.

The madrasa attached to the mosque became known as al-Ghurabiyya Madrasa and was active among younger generations. However, the madrasa fell into ruins 180 years later.

==== The second madrasa ====
Around 1887, a Baghdadi sheikh named Ibrahim al-Rawas travelled to Istanbul to meet with Ottoman Sheikh al-Islam Abu al-Huda al-Sayyadi to discuss restoring the Sayyid Sultan Ali Mosque. This request led to a royal decree to be issued by Ottoman Sultan Abdul-Hamid II years later. It cost 4,000 Ottoman liras. In 1892, the mosque was renovated by Sultan Abdul-Hamid II. The Sultan added a new madrasa to the mosque. The newly renovated complex, also dedicated to the Rifa'i Order, had an appointed Imam, a preacher, a muezzin, and a caretaker. The second madrasa overlooked al-Rashid Street, which would later be built over the old alleged Jalayirid minaret. The new mosque contained a large dome surmounting the tomb of Sayyid Sultan Ali. It also contained a library that had rare manuscripts and printed books. Starting with Ibrahim al-Rawas, the noble Rifa'i Baghdadi family of al-Rawas assumed custodianship of the mosque and taught in the madrasa. Among the main teachers of the madrasa were Mahmud Shukri al-Alusi and the scholar Abdullah al-Shaykhli. In 1894, a royal decree was issued to allocate food to the visitors and students of the mosque, who visited the madrasa and the Sufi Lodge.

==== The Sufi Lodge ====
The Kara Ali Tekke, also known as the Qazra Ali Tekke, is a Sufi lodge established by Kara Ali Pasha. Kara Ali Pasha also helped establish the first madrasa and a Sufi lodge in Bab al-Sheikh known as the Arab Tekke. The lodge became a refuge for many dervishes, fakirs, and foreigners since at least 1670 CE. It was also restored by Sultan Abdul-Hamid II with the help of Abu al-Huda al-Sayyadi.

== Modern history ==
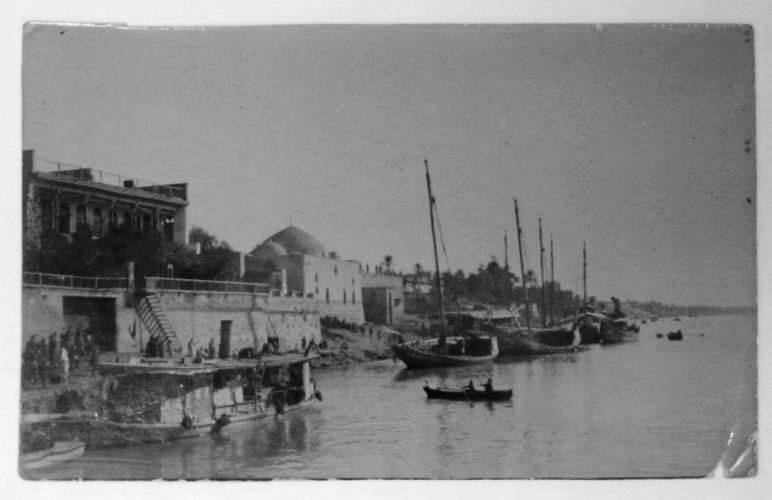
The mosque as seen from the shores of the Tigris River in 1919.

Around 1956, the remains of a member of the Rawas family were moved into the mosque. It was moved from his shrine in the now-demolished al-Rawas Mosque. The mosque was destroyed so that the Jumhuriyya Street could be expanded. Other tombs were added to the mosque that belonged to other Baghdadi muftis and scholars.

In 2001, the mosque was renovated, and more developments and restorations were ordered by Saddam Hussein, President of Iraq at that time. Since its establishment, the mosque has been under the management of the family of Ibrahim al-Rawas, a nobleman from the Rifa'i order. In 2016, the nobleman Sheikh Abdullah al-Rawas supervised a reopening of the mosque. After the Iraq War, the library's manuscripts and books were taken by the Sunni Endowment Office and moved to an unknown private library.

=== Dispute over the identity of Sayyid Sultan Ali ===
It is commonly believed that the person buried in the mosque, Sayyid Sultan Ali, is the father (or grandfather) of Ahmad al-Rifa'i. Local traditions relate that he came to Baghdad during the Abbasid Caliphate, and upon his death, he was buried in his house. The ruler turned the house into a mosque out of respect. Iraqi historian, Muhammad Bahjat 'Athari, rejects this story and considers it a fabrication. He instead gives the identity of the entombed as Sultan Ali ibn Isma'il, the grandson of Ja'far al-Sadiq. Mahmud Shukri al-Alusi, who taught at the madrasa, did not mention the existence of a shrine or even a grave in the mosque despite having written a detailed description of it in his book. The Qadi, Ala' al-Din al-Shukri, writes that the entombed was a governor of Baghdad also named Sayyid Sultan Ali.

== Architecture and plan ==
The mosque has the capacity to accommodate more than 1,000 worshippers. It contains a library and a madrasa, where important scholars such as Mahmud al-Alusi taught. The minaret of the mosque is built with brick, in the way of the Ottoman architectural style, while the exterior of it is decorated with blue tiles. The prayer hall of the mosque contains a mihrab and an old minbar. The walls of the prayer hall are adorned with calligraphic inscriptions and Qur'anic verses from the inside. The mosque also contains a Sufi Lodge, known as Kara Ali Tekke, and sometimes religious classes were conducted in the Lodge as well.

After the entrance to the mosque, on the left-hand side, is the mausoleum of Sayyid Sultan Ali. Next to him is buried the Rifa'i ascetic, Baha al-Din al-Rawas, whose remains were moved here after the original tomb was demolished along with its adjoining mosque. There are also several other tombstones next to Sayyid Sultan Ali's and al-Rawas family graves. On the right-hand side, there is a doorway leading to the Madrasa of Qara Ali. There is also a tomb dedicated to the Ottoman noblewoman Khatun bint Darwish Jalabi, located in the middle of the entrance to a corridor of the mosque.

== See also ==
- List of mosques in Baghdad
- Islam in Iraq
