= Mahmud Shukri al-Alusi =

Iraqi writer, historian, and Islamic scholar

Maḥmūd Shukrī al-Ālūsī
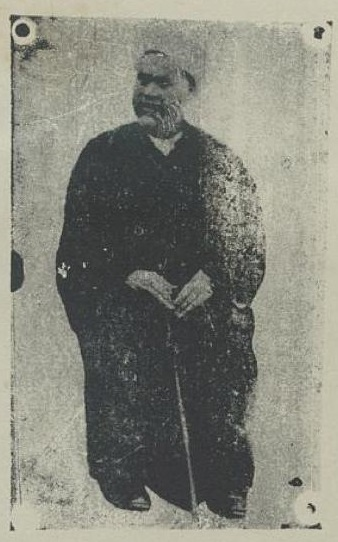
- The only known portrait of Mahmud Shukri al-Alusi, taken in the time period of 1900–1920.

Personal life
- Born: Maḥmūd Shukrī ibn ‘Abdullāh Bahāʾ al-Dīn; 1856 Baghdad; Ottoman Empire
- Died: 1924 (aged 67–68) Baghdad; Mandatory Iraq
- Main interest(s): Salafi reformism, Islamic history
- Notable work: See below

Religious life
- Religion: Islam
- Denomination: Sunni (Sufi)
- Jurisprudence: Ḥanafī
- Creed: Atharī

Muslim leader
- Disciple of: Nu'man al-Alusi
- Influenced by: Mahmud al-Alusi, Nu'man al-Alusi, Muhammad ibn Abd al-Wahhab, Shah Abdul Aziz Dehlavi
- Influenced: Muhammad Bahjat Athari, Rashid Hassan al-Kurdi, Anastase-Marie al-Karmali

Maḥmūd Shukrī al-Ālūsī (1856–1924) was a historian, jurist, and Islamic scholar of the Hanafi school. He was a grandson of the exegete Mahmud al-Alusi and a disciple of his uncle Nu'man al-Alusi. Living in Baghdad, Al-Alusi was an early advocate of the Salafi movement in Iraq, but strongly opposed Wahhabism.

== Biography ==
Mahmud Shukri bin Abdullah Bahauddin was born in 1856 in Baghdad. Coming from the scholarly Alusi family, he was the grandson of Mahmud al-Alusi, an Iraqi Islamic scholar best known for writing the Rūh al-Ma'ānī, a commentary on the Qur'an. In his early years of education, Mahmud Shukri al-Alusi became a disciple of his uncle Nu'man al-Alusi, who taught him the Islamic disciplines, including jurisprudence and creed. He also explored the paths of Sufism, including the Naqshbandi and Qadiri orders, which were popular at the time in Ottoman-ruled Baghdad.

After receiving his ijazah, Mahmoud Shukri al-Alusi began to campaign against the Sufi practices which he deemed "polytheistic" and "contradictory to the Islamic religion." This resulted in him being exiled from Baghdad in 1904 after its governor, Abdulwahab Pasha, received letters of complaints from locals demanding that the government take action against him for his extremist beliefs that were reformist in nature. He was sent to exile in Mosul but was ordered to return to Baghdad a year later after the nobles of Mosul defended him and wrote a complaint to the Ottoman Sultan, stating that Al-Alusi was innocent of any heresies or extremism.

After the Fall of Baghdad in 1917, the British forces occupied Baghdad, successfully driving out the remaining Ottoman forces in the centre of the city. General Stanley Maude, leader of the expedition, met with Al-Alusi and offered him the position of the chief judge, but Al-Alusi turned down his offer. Ottoman agents also appointed Al-Alusi to contact the Emir of Mecca for assistance in recapturing Baghdad, but the Emir declined Al-Alusi's request. He returned to Baghdad in 1918, resuming his career as a writer and scholar. In 1921, he served as a minister of the Education Council under Faisal al-Hashmi, who had been newly appointed as the ruler of Mandatory Iraq under British suzerainty.

Mahmud Shukri al-Alusi passed away from an illness in 1924. He was buried in the Sheikh Ma'ruf Cemetery in Karkh next to his grandfather and some of his relatives.

== Religious views ==
Mahmud Shukri al-Alusi adhered to the Hanafi school of thought, while following the doctrine of Atharism. His preference for the Athari doctrine drew ire from contemporary scholars such as Abu al-Huda al-Sayyadi, due to the fact that the doctrine of Maturidism was well-established within the Hanafi school, unlike the doctrines of Atharism and Ash'arism. Al-Alusi was also tolerant of Sufism, considering it to be a respectable doctrine, but also oppposed extreme Sufi practices such as self-flagellation and grave worship, that were prevalent during his time.

Regarding the Salafi movement, Al-Alusi was a prominent supporter of the movement and its reformist practices. However, he had a distaste for the Wahhabi movement. Despite his opposition to Wahhabism, Al-Alusi defended the Wahhabis when it came to creedal matters, affirming that they were Hanbalis, while also disproving accusations against the group.

Al-Alusi was interested in Islamic history and architecture, writing books and treatises about such topics. According to his student Muhammad Bahjat Athari, he was also interested in the study of Arabic grammar and linguistics.

== Works ==
- Tārīkh masājid Baghdād wa-āthārihā (History of the Mosques and Monuments of Baghdad) – A guide detailing the historic mosques and monuments in the city of Baghdad, including the Marjan Mosque and the Syed Sultan Ali Mosque. It has been reprinted by the Sunni Endowment Office in 2010.
- Ghāyat al-Amānī fī al-Radd ‘alā al-Nabhānī (The Ultimate Goal in Refuting Al-Nabhani) – A treatise refuting Yusuf al-Nabhani, a contemporary Islamic scholar who was known for his Sufism, including practices which Al-Alusi deemed to be "heretical."
- Bulūgh al-Arab fī Ma‘rifat Aḥwāl al-‘Arab (Reaching the Goal in Knowing the Circumstances of the Arabs) – A book on the history of pre-Islamic Arabia, including descriptions of the religious rituals practiced by the ancient Arab civilisations such as the Sabaeans and Himyarites.
- Mukhtaṣar al-Tuḥfah al-Ithnay ‘Ashariyyah (Abridgement of Tuḥfah al-Ithnay ‘Ashariyyah) – An abridged and annotated version of the book Tuḥfah al-Ithnay ‘Ashariyyah, a treatise refuting the doctrines of Twelver Shi'ism, that was written by the Indian Muslim scholar, Shah Abdul Aziz Dehlavi. Al-Alusi's version of the book includes his own commentaries and omits material that he considers redundant.

== See also ==
- List of Hanafis
- List of Atharis
