= Abu al-Huda al-Sayyadi =

Syrian Islamic scholar

Personal life
- Born: Muhammad bin Hassan Wadi bin Ali bin Khuzam al-Sayyadi; 1849 Khan Shaykhun, Idlib Governorate, Syria
- Died: 1909 (aged 59–60) Büyükada, Princes' Islands, Istanbul, Turkey
- Resting place: His shrine, near Khan Shaykhun in Idlib Governorate, Syria
- Occupation: Islamic scholar and poet

Religious life
- Religion: Islam
- Jurisprudence: Shafi'i
- Tariqa: Rifa'i
- Creed: Ash'ari

Abu al-Huda al-Sayyadi (Arabic: أبو الهدى الصيادي), full name Muhammad bin Hassan Wadi bin Ali bin Khuzam al-Sayyadi, was a Syrian Islamic scholar and poet, who held the title Shaykh al-Mashayikh, or head of the Sufi Shayks, of the Ottoman Empire during the reign of Abdülhamid II. He is the father of Hasan Abu Al-Huda, the fourth Prime Minister of Transjordan (r. 1923–1931).

== Biography ==
Sayyadi was born in 1849 in Khan Shaykhun, modern day Syria. His lineage allegedly goes back to Ahmad al-Rifa'i and Muhammad, making him a Sharif. He was made Naqib al-Ashraf, or head of the Sharifs, of Jisr al-Shughur by Abdülaziz in 1871, and of Aleppo in 1873.

Sayyadi met with prominent reformists like Jamal al-Din al-Afghani. In 1895, he established a library next to the Eyüp Sultan Mosque in Istanbul, Turkey.

In 1876, the Ottoman Sultan at the time, Abdülhamid II, met Sayyadi and made him Shaykh al-Mashayikh of the Ottoman Empire. After Abdülhamid II was deposed, Sayyadi was exiled to Büyükada where he died in 1909. He is buried next to his father in Aleppo.

== Views ==
Sayyadi was a supporter of Sufism. He was part of the Rifa'i tariqa, and wrote poems and books with Sufi themes. Sayyadi was also very anti-Salafi in his views. He encouraged the Ottoman Empire to issue a crackdown on Wahhabism. This resulted in Mahmud Shukri al-Alusi, a Sufi scholar with Salafi-influenced beliefs, being sent into exile.

== Works ==
- Khizanat al-Amdad fi Akhbar al-Ghawth al-Kabir al-Sajad Mawlana al-Sayyid 'Izz al-Din 'Ahmad al-Sayaad
- Buni al-Islam 'iya la Khamsat Ma'badi

== See also ==
- Mahmud Shukri al-Alusi
- Jamal al-Din al-Afghani
