= Nu'man al-Alusi =

Iraqi writer, linguist, and Islamic scholar

Khayr al-Dīn Nu'mān al-Alūsī
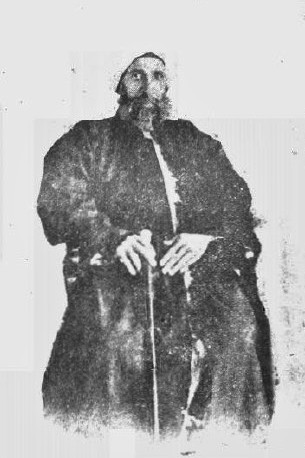
- The only known portrait of Nu'man al-Alusi.

Personal life
- Born: Khayr al-Dīn Nu'mān ibn Maḥmūd al-Alūsī; 1836 Baghdad; Ottoman Empire
- Died: 1899 (aged 62–63) Baghdad; Ottoman Empire
- Main interest(s): Salafi reformism, Arabic linguistics
- Notable work: See below

Religious life
- Religion: Islam
- Denomination: Sunni (Salafi)
- Jurisprudence: Ijtihād
- Creed: Atharī

Muslim leader
- Influenced by: Mahmud al-Alusi
- Influenced: Anastase-Marie al-Karmali, Mahmud Shukri al-Alusi

Khayr al-Dīn Nu'mān al-Alūsī (1836–1899) was an Islamic scholar, jurist and linguist who lived in Baghdad, Iraq. A supporter of the Salafi movement, he served as an influence of Mahmud Shukri al-Alusi, his nephew and close disciple.

== Biography ==
Khayr al-Dīn Nu'mān ibn Maḥmūd was born in 1836 in Baghdad, Iraq. He was the son of Mahmud al-Alusi, an Islamic scholar and Mufti of the Hanafi school best known for writing the Rūh al-Ma'ānī, a multi-volume work of exegesis on the Qur'an. Al-Alusi learned the basics of the Islamic religion from his father, while he studied Islamic jurisprudence, creed and theology abroad in Istanbul as well as the Al-Azhar University of Cairo, Egypt. When he returned to Baghdad after two years in Cairo and Istanbul, he was given the ijazah to begin his career as a jurist and advanced scholar of Islamic theology. Al-Alusi's nephew, Mahmud Shukri, became one of his close disciples, with him teaching Islamic methodology to the young Mahmud Shukri, who would later grow up to become a scholar of his own right.

Al-Alusi was a supporter of the Salafi movement, and in 1818 he declared his support for the movement by publishing a treatise titled Jalāʾ al-ʿaynayn, an introduction to contemporary Salafism and the tenets of the movement. Al-Alusi did not ascribe to a particular school of thought, even though his family was mainly well-versed in the traditions of the Hanafi school. His nephew, Mahmud Shukri, adopted the tradition of Salafism from him, but refrained from excessively following him in it, due to his condemnation of Sufi orders, which were prominent amongst the Alusi family at the time. Catholic scholar of Islam, Louis Massignon, however, stated that Al-Alusi followed the Hanbali school, although this is likely due to him conflating Salafism and Hanbalism as one.

Nu'man al-Alusi passed away in 1899, at the age of 63. He was buried in the cemetery of al-Marjaniyya in Baghdad, behind the mosque and madrasa that he used to teach at. In order to expand the streets around the mosque, his grave was exhumed and reinterred at an unspecified location in 1946.

== Works ==
- Jalāʾ al-ʿaynayn fī muḥākamat al-Aḥmadayn (The Illumination of the Two Eyes in the Trial of the Two Ahmads) is a treatise written in 1818 as a handbook to the Salafi movement, including basic tenets and theology of Salafism. In the book, Nu'man al-Alusi declares that the standard form of theology and creed is that of Atharism.
- Salis al-ghāniyāt fī dhawāt al-ṭarafayn min al-kalimāt (Palindromic Words in Two-Way Readings) An explanatory work on Arabic linguistics, compiling over a hundred examples of palindromes.

== See also ==
- List of Atharis
