= Taqlid =

Following the teaching of an Islamic scholar rather than reasoning independently

Taqlid (Arabic: تقليد, romanized: Taqlīd) is a term used in Islamic jurisprudence to denote the conformity of one person to the teaching of another. As such, the person who performs taqlid is termed muqallid. The definite meaning of the term varies depending on context and age. Classical usage of the term differs between Sunni Islam and Shia Islam. Sunni Islamic usage designates the unjustified conformity of one person to the teaching of another, rather than the justified conformity of a layperson to the teaching of a mujtahid (a person who is qualified for independent reasoning). Shia Islamic usage designates general conformity to the teaching of a mujtahid, and there is no negative connotation. The discrepancy corresponds to differing views on the Shia Imamate and Sunni imams.

In contemporary Salafi usage, taqlid is often portrayed in a negative light and translated as "blind imitation". This refers to the perceived stagnation of independent effort (ijtihad) and uncritical imitation of traditional religious interpretation by the religious establishment in general.

== Overview ==
The Arabic word taqlīd is derived from the three-letter Arabic verbal root of ق-ل-د Q-L-D , which means to imitate. The term is believed to have originated from the idea of allowing oneself to be led "by the collar". One who performs taqlid is called a muqallid, whereas one who rejects taqlid is called a ghair-muqallid.

=== Sunni Islam ===
Traditionally, taqlid is lawful and obligatory when one is not qualified as a mujtahid. According to Rudolph Peters, this is by the consensus of all Sunni Muslims.

Traditional Sunni scholars rely on two verses of the Qur'an that order one to ask the people of knowledge or remembrance if they do not know and to obey Allah, the messenger and those in authority among them. They also rely on several hadiths, including one where Muhammad tells his companions, "If one does not know what to do, the only remedy is to inquire." Muhammad did this after a companion who had fractured his skull asked other companions with him whether he could perform dry purification. They said no. So this injured companion washed his head with water and died. Muhammad admonished his companions by saying, "They killed him. May Allah kill them. If one does not know what to do, the only remedy is to inquire."

Salafi and Wahhabis reject taqlid of the four schools, Hanafi, Maliki, Shafi'i and Hanbali, and instead encourage ijtihad (independent reasoning) Salafi Wahhabi scholars regarded taqlid as a form of shirk (polytheism). Salafis like Sanaullah Amritsari went to the extent of declaring taqlid as kufr (disbelief).

=== Shia Islam ===
In Shia Islam, taqlid "denotes the following or "imitating" of the dictates of a mujtahid". Following the greater occultation (al-ghaybatu 'l-kubra) in 941 CE (329 AH), the Twelver Shia are obliged to observe taqlid in their religious jurisprudential affairs by following the teachings of a thinker (mujtahid) or jurist (faqih). As of the 19th century the Shia ulama taught believers to turn to "a source of taqlid" (marja' at-taqlid) "for advice and guidance and as a model to be imitated." Thus Shia who are not experts in Islamic jurisprudence (fiqh) are "legally required to follow the instructions of the expert, i.e., the mujtahid" in matters of sharia, but are forbidden to do so in "matters of belief" (usul al-din).

== See also ==
- Case law
- Madhhab
