= Mahmud al-Alusi =

Iraqi Islamic scholar and poet (1802–1854)

Abū al-Thanā’ Shihāb ad-Dīn Maḥmūd al-Ḥusaynī al-Ālūsī أبو الثناء شهاب الدين محمودالحسيني الآلوسي
- Title: al-Ālūsī Al-Kabīr (The Grand Ālūsī)

Personal life
- Born: 10 December 1802 CE / 1217 AH Baghdad, Baghdad Vilayet, Ottoman Empire
- Died: 29 July 1854 CE / 1270 AH
- Resting place: Sheikh Marouf cemetery in Baghdad
- Notable work: Ruh al-Ma'ani
- Occupation: Islamic scholar, Mufti, religious teacher

Religious life
- Religion: Islam
- Denomination: Sunni Islam
- Jurisprudence: Hanafi/ (Shafi'i influenced)
- Tariqa: Naqshbandi
- Creed: Maturidi

Muslim leader
- Influenced by: Abu Hanifa; Al-Shafi'i
- Influenced: Mahmud Shukri al-Alusi

Abū al-Thanā’ Shihāb ad-Dīn Sayyid Maḥmūd ibn ‘Abd Allāh al-Ḥusaynī al-Ālūsī al-Baghdādī (Arabic: أبو الثناء شهاب الدين سيد محمود بن عبد الله بن محمود الحسيني الآلوسي البغدادي; 10 December 1802 – 29 July 1854 CE) was an Iraqi Islamic scholar best known for writing Ruh al-Ma'ani, an exegesis (tafsir) of the Qur'an.

== Biography ==
He was born in Baghdad on the day of Jumu`ah, 14 Sha`ban 1217 AH (Friday, 10 December 1802).

He was a prominent Baghdad scholar in the Ottoman Empire. Because some of his phrases resembled that of the Ahl al-Hadith and Salafis such Ibn Taymiyyah and Muhammad ibn Abdul Wahhab, he was accused of supporting Wahhabism. This led to his dismissal in 1847. He sent his tafsir to the authorities in Istanbul as proof for his loyalty to the established Islamic tradition and the Ottoman Empire. ʿĀrif Hikmet Bey was impressed by al-Alusi's deep knowledge and advised him to consult Reşid Mehmed Pasha for his concern. Reşid Mehmed Pasha eventually assigned him as a member of the madrasa of the Mirjan Mosque and the position of a mufti.

He died on 5 Dhul-Q'dah, 1270 AH (29 July 1854)

== Works ==
An exhaustive list of all his works far too long and thus difficult to compile. Indexes in the British Library and the below are a few examples:

- Rūḥ al-Ma‘ānī fī Tafsīr al-Qur’ān al-‘Aẓīm wa-al-Sab‘ al-Mathānī (روح المعاني في تفسير القرآن العظيم والسبع المثاني)
- Nashwat al-Shamūl fī al-Safar ilā Islāmbūl (نشوة الشمول في السفر إلى إسلامبول)
- Nashwat al-Mudām fī al-‘Awd ilá Madīnat al-Salām (نشوة المدام في العود إلي مدينة السلام)
- al-Ajwibah al-‘Irāqīyah ‘alá al-As’ilah al-Lāhūrīyah (الأجوبة العراقية على الأسئلة اللاهورية)
- al-Ajwibah al-‘Irāqīyah ‘an al-As’ilah al-Īrānīyah (الأجوبة العراقية عن الأسئلة الإيرانية)
- Ghra'b al-'Ightirab (غرائب الإغتراب)
- Daqaiq al-Tafsir (دقائق التفسير)
- Sharh Sullam al-Mantiq (شرح سلم المنطق)
- al-Tiraz al-Mudh-hab Fi Sharh Qasydat al-Baz al-Ash-hab (الطراز المذهب في شرح قصيدة الباز الأشهب)
- al-Maqamat al-Alousiya (المقامات الآلوسية)

== Legacy ==
Mahmud al-Alusi had five sons who were also scholars: Sayyid Abdullah Bahauddin al-Alusi, Sayyid Sa'ad Abdulbaqi al-Alusi, Nu'man al-Alusi, Sayyid Mohammad Hamid al-Afandi and Sayyid Ahmed Shakir al-Afandi. His tafsir was published for the first time in 1883. Through his son Sayyid Abdullah Bahauddin al-Alusi, Mahmud had a grandson, Mahmud Shukri al-Alusi, who was a leading scholar of Baghdad and a religious reformist.
