= Muhammad Bahjat Athari =

Iraqi writer and linguist

- Born: 1904; Baghdad, Iraq
- Died: 1996 (aged 91–92); Baghdad, Iraq
- Occupations: Arabic language teacher, jurist, calligrapher and historian
- Awards: King Faisal Prize for Arabic Literature in 1986

Muhammad Bahjat Athari (Arabic: محمد بهجة الأثري) was a Muslim Iraqi linguist, historian and a jurist. He was a student and close companion of the Hanafi scholar, Mahmud Shukri al-Alusi.

== Biography ==
His full name is Muhammad Bahjat bin Mahmud Effendi. His lineage is Muhammad Bahjat bin Mahmud Effendi bin Abdul Qadir bin Ahmed bin Mahmud al-Bakri. He was born in 1904 in Baghdad, and resided there for his life. His family, at the time his birth, were successful traders and owned many properties in Iraq. His great-grandfather, Ahmed bin Mahmud al-Bakri, moved from Diyarbakir to Erbil where he was married to a Baghdadi family from the Qays clan. Zainab, the mother of Muhammad Bahjat Athari, was an Iraqi Turkmen, originally from Kirkuk who was fluent in both Turkish and Arabic languages.

Muhammad Bahjat studied under many prominent scholars in his lifetime. These include Nu'man al-Alusi, 'Ala al-Din al-Alusi, and Mahmud Shukri al-Alusi. He was especially very close with the latter, and they remained as close companions. Bahjat would accompany Mahmud al-Alusi until 8 May 1924 when he died of a chronic disease.

Muhammad Bahjat Athari worked as a teacher in 1924. Four years later, he founded the Young Muslim Men Association for youths. In 1936, he was appointed by the government to be the director of Baghdad's endowments. At the same time, he was a professor at a college and the general director of the Islamic Endowments of Baghdad. Bahjat then became an editor for the Aalam Islam magazine in 1938.

Bahjat served as a member of the Iraqi Academy of Sciences and supervised the editing of its magazine. He also served as a member of the Arab Scientific Academy in Damascus, Syria, the Arabic Language Academy in Cairo, Egypt, the Academy of the Kingdom of Morocco, the Supreme Advisory Council of the Islamic University of Medina and the Translation and Authorship Committee. He was also pro-Palestinian, and he participated in the membership of pro-Palestinian societies.

Bahjat was a master calligrapher, with a unique style similar to Mahmud Shukri al-Alusi. He was also interested in history and biography. His historical writings include the Kitab Aalam Iraq, which contains the biographies of prominent figures of Iraq. He was also a poet, and he has two huge collections of poetry.

Muhammad Bahjat Athari died in 1996 in Baghdad, at the age of 92 years.

== Origin of his nickname “Athari” ==
There is a story about how Muhammad Bahjat received his nickname "Athari". It is said that Bahjat was learning the book Maraqi al-Falah bi Imdaad al-Fattah Sharh Nur al-Idah from his teacher 'Ala al-Din al-Alusi, but he did not like the book and asked his teacher not to study it. So his 'Ala al-Din al-Alusi said to him, "What do you want to read?" Bahjat said, "I want to get to know the true Islamic jurisprudence." So, 'Ala al-Din told him, "Then, you are of the Athari." Bahjat asked him about the meaning of "Athari," so his teacher said to him, "The Athari is a person who follows the way of the prophet, may blessings and peace be upon him, in word and deed."

== Works ==
Among his twenty-five works include:

- Kitab Aalam Iraq
- al-Khutut al-Aridat fi Tarikh al-Adab al-Arabi
- al-Muwaffaq fi Tarikh al-Arabi
- Muhadhib Tarikh al-Masajid Baghdad wa Thariha
- Masaat al-Sha'ir Waddah al-Yaman
- al-Iatijahat al-hadithat fi al-Islam (Recent TTends in Islam)
- Hayaat Mahmud Shukri al-Alusi wara'ah al-Lughawia (The Life and Linguistic Views of Mahmud Shukri al-Alusi)
- al-Zawahir al-Kawniat fi al-Qur'an (Cosmic Phenomena in the Qur'an)

Aside from books, Bahjat also wrote for and contributed to the Lughat al-Arab magazine in the mid-1920s.

== Positions ==
- Director of the Baghdad General Waqf Directorate.
- Head of the Iraq Academy of Sciences
- Member of the Arabic Language Academy in Damascus, Jordan, and Cairo

== Awards ==
- King Faisal Prize for Arabic Literature in 1986
- Saddam Hussein International Prize.
