= Ruh al-Ma'ani =

Book by Mahmud al-Alusi

- Author: Mahmud al-Alusi
- Original title: روح المعاني في تفسير القرآن العظيم والسبع المثاني
- Language: Arabic
- Subject: Quranic exegesis
- Genre: Islamic theology
- Publisher: Dar Ihia al-Turath al-Arabi
- Publication date: 19th century
- Publication place: Iraq
- Media type: Print
- Pages: 30 volumes

Rūh al-Ma'ānī fī Tafsīri-l-Qur'āni-l-'Aẓīm wa Sab'u-l-Mathānī (Arabic: روح المعاني في تفسير القرآن العظيم والسبع المثاني, lit. 'The Spirit of Meanings in the Tafsir of the Grand Qur'an and the Seven Oft-Repeated Verses') is a 30-volume tafsir of the Qur'an, authored by the 19th-century Iraqi Islamic scholar Mahmud al-Alusi.

== Comments of the Scholars of the Later Centuries ==
Yusuf Banuri, the favourite student of 'Allamah Anwar Shah Kashmiri (R'A), has written in his Yatīmatu-i-Bayān. Muqaddimah (Preface) to Mushkilātu-i-Qur'ān:

The third is Tafseer Roohu-i-Ma'ani which in my opinion is an exegesis for the Qur'an on the pattern of Fath al-Bari, the exegesis of Sahih al-Bukhari, except that Fath al-Bari is the interpretation of human words. It has paid the debt of the exegesis of Sahih al-Bukhari on the Ummah. But the Words of Allah are much higher and more exalted for any human being to give its due right.

Mufti Taqi Usmani (DB) has written in his 'Ulūmu-i-Qur'ān (An Approach to the Qur'anic Sciences):

Since this is the publication of latest era, he has tried to gather important discussions of previous exegeses. Hence elaborate discussions have been carried out on language, grammar, literature, rhetoric, jurisprudence, beliefs, etymology, geophysics, astronomy, philosophy, spiritualism, and relevant narrations. An attempt has been made that no scientific and literary problem should remain unanswered. In the matter of reporting of Traditions also 'Allamah Alusi (R'A) had been more careful than other commentators. In this respect it may be called synopsis of the earlier exegeses, and no work on exegesis of Qur'an can do without help from this work.

== Editions ==
- 1-30 in 15 Volumes, Editors: Mohammad al-Amad and Omar al-Salami, Introduction: al-Taher bn Ashur, Publisher: Dar Ihia al-Turath al-Arabi-Lebanon.

== See also ==
- List of Sunni books
