= Islamic Academy =

Islamic Academy may refer to:

- International Islamic Fiqh Academy, an international Islamic institution for the advanced study of Islamic jurisprudence, founded in June 1983 as a subsidiary organ of the Organization of Islamic Cooperation.
- The Islamic Foundation Bangladesh, an autonomous organization under the Ministry of Religious Affairs in Bangladesh working to disseminate values and ideals of Islam and carry out activities related to those values and ideals
- The Welsh Baptist Chapel in Manchester, also known as the Islamic Academy
- Islamic Fiqh Academy (disambiguation)
- Islamic Saudi Academy, an International Baccalaureate (IB) World university preparatory school in Virginia, accredited with the Southern Association of Colleges and Schools and authorized by IB in December 2008
