= Abdur-Razzaq al-Badr =

Sheikh Dr. Abdur-Razzaq al-Badr
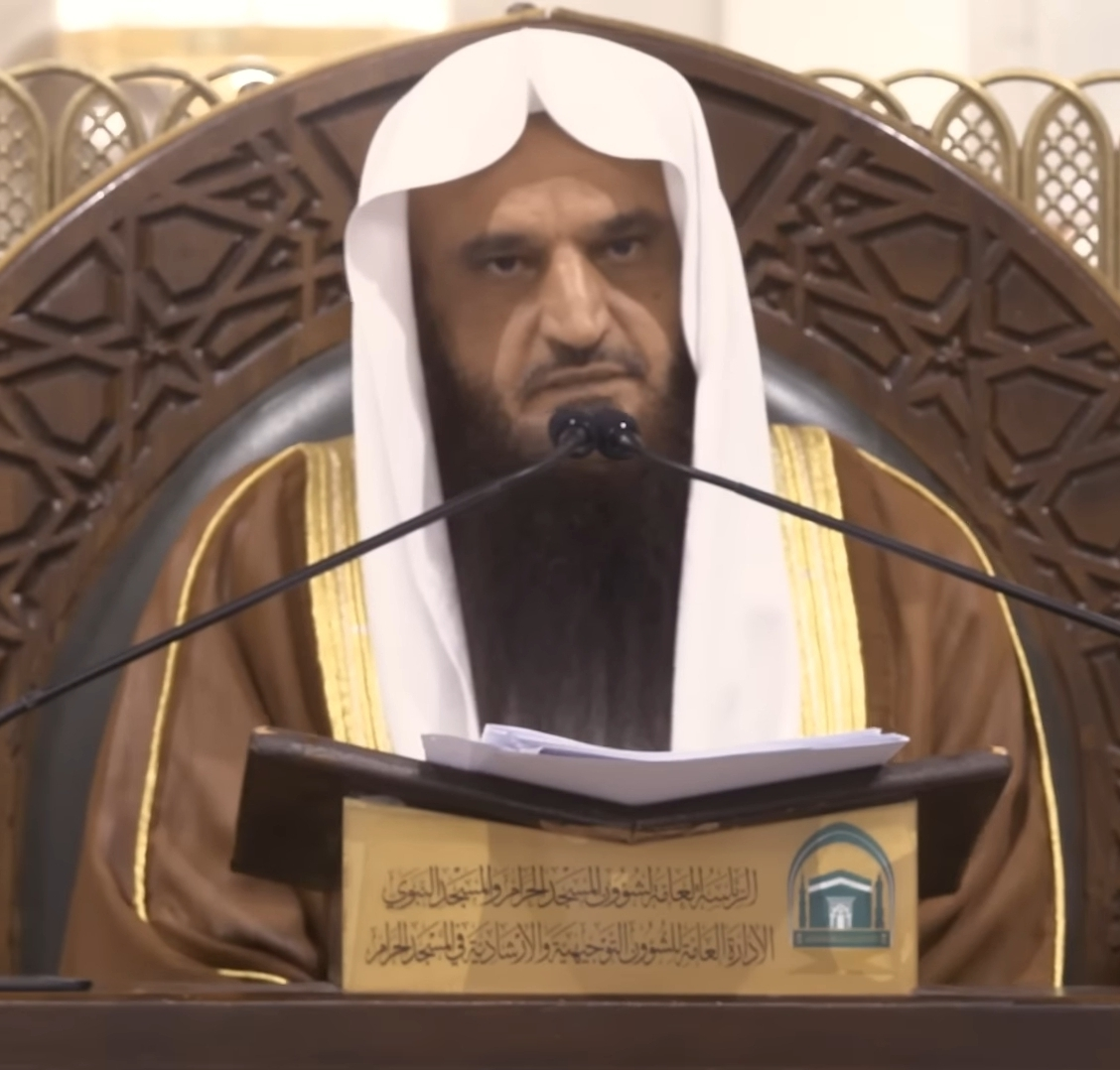

Personal life
- Born: Abdur-Razzaq ibn Abdul-Muhsin al-Abbad ibn Hamad ibn Abdul-Muhsin ibn Abdullah ibn Hamad ibn Uthman al-Badr; 16 April 1963 (age 63) Al-Zulfi City, Riyadh Province, Saudi Arabia
- Parent: Abdul-Muhsin al-Abbad
- Education: Islamic University of Madinah
- Occupation: Cleric, Professor
- Website: al-badr.net

Religious life
- Religion: Islam
- Denomination: Sunni
- Jurisprudence: Hanbali
- Creed: Athari
- Movement: Salafism

Muslim leader
- Influenced by: Ahmad ibn Hanbal, Ibn Taymiyya, Ibn Baz, al-Uthaymin, Abdul-Muhsin al-Abbad

YouTube information
- Channel: الشيخ عبد الرزاق البدر - sheikhalbadr
- Genre: Islamic
- Subscribers: 226,000
- Views: 10,972,934
- Last updated: 23 June 2026

Abdur-Razzaq al-Badr is a Salafi Islamic scholar from Saudi Arabia who gives lectures and teaches in Madinah, Saudi Arabia.

== Early life and education ==
Abdur-Razzaq al-Badr was born on April 16, 1963, in Al-Zulfi, Saudi Arabia. He is the son of the Saudi Hadith Scholar Abdul-Muhsin al-Abbad. He studied extensively with his father growing up in the fields of Hadith, Tafsir, Fiqh, Aqeedah, and more. After completing his primary and secondary education, he attended the Islamic University of Madinah where he eventually completed his doctorate in Islamic Aqeedah. He went to then become a lecturer both at the university and the Prophet's Mosque.

He has taken knowledge from many scholars, most notably:

- His father, Sheikh Abdul-Muhsin al-Abbad
- Sheikh Ibn Baz
- Sheikh Muhammad ibn Salih al-Uthaymin
- Sheikh Ali ibn Nasir Faqihi

== Works ==
- Understanding the Beautiful Names of Allah
- Understanding Supplications and Remembrances (Dhikr)
- Hajj and the Refinement of the Soul
- A Study on Imam Malik's View Regarding Istiwā’ (Allah's Rising Over the Throne)
- Al-Hawqalah (The Phrase "La hawla wa la quwwata illa billah"): Its Concept, Virtues, and Theological Significance
- Studies on the "Enduring Good Deeds" (Al-Baqiyat al-Salihat)
- Al-Tuhfah al-Sunniyyah: A Commentary on the Ha’iyyah Poem by Ibn Abi Dawud
- Remembrances Related to Ritual Purity and Prayer
- Commentary on the Annotations of Abu Dawud
- Hadiths on the Reformation of the Heart
- Hadiths on Faith (Iman)
- Hadiths on Character and Ethics
- Tadhkirat al-Mu’tasi: A Commentary on the Creed of Al-Hafiz Abd al-Ghani al-Maqdisi
- Commentary on "The Six Principles" (Al-Usul al-Sittah) by Sheikh Muhammad bin Abd al-Wahhab al-Tamimi (edited and annotated by Munir al-Jaza’iri)
