= Muhammad Sa'id Raslan =

Egyptian Salafi scholar

Shaykh Muhammad Sa'id Raslan

Personal life
- Born: 23 November 1955 (age 70)
- Occupation: Imam

Religious life
- Religion: Islam
- Jurisprudence: Ghayr Muqallid
- Creed: Athari
- Movement: Salafism

Military service
- Website: https://rslan.com/

Dr. Muḥammad bin Saʻīd Raslān (Arabic: محمد بن سعيد رسلان; born November 23, 1955) is an Egyptian Salafi scholar based in Sobk al-Ahad, Egypt.

== Early life ==
Muhammad Sa'id Raslan was influenced by Muhammad Aman al-Jami, a senior Salafi scholar from Ethiopia, and Rabi' al-Madkhali.

== Biography ==
Following the 2011 uprising in Egypt, Raslan attracted attention by opposing the rebellion against then-President Hosni Mubarak, which diverged from the views held by some fellow Salafis at the time. Despite his non-involvement in politics, Raslan's influence has steadily grown, with his Friday sermons reportedly drawing crowds of up to 4,000 individuals. He has emerged as a vocal critic of the Muslim Brotherhood, a powerful political group in Egypt, and has expressed strong reservations about their ideology and practices.

== Works ==
Raslan has authored more than 447 books and 381 series.
