= Rabi' al-Madkhali =

Saudi Arabian Islamic scholar (1933–2025)

Sheikh Rabi' bin Hadi al-Madkhali

Personal life
- Born: 1933 Jarradiyah, Samtah Governorate, Saudi Arabia
- Died: 9 July 2025 (aged 92) Madinah, Saudi Arabia
- Notable works: Al-`Awaasim mimaa fi Kutub Sayyid Qutb min al-Qawaasim (A refutation of Sayyid Qutb’s writings); Manhaj al-Anbiya fi al-Da'wa ila Allah (The methodology of the prophets in calling to Allah)
- Education: Islamic University of Madinah
- Known for: Madkhalism
- Occupation: Islamic scholar, University professor
- Website: http://rabee.net/

Religious life
- Religion: Islam
- Creed: Athari
- Movement: Salafi

Muslim leader
- Disciple of: Muhammad al-Amin al-Shinqiti; Ibn Baz; Al-Albani; Badi' al-Din al-Sindi; Abdul-Muhsin al-Abbad; Ahmad ibn Yahya al-Najmi; Muhammad Aman al-Jami; Abdul-Ghaffar Hasan al-Hindi; Muhammad Sagheer Khumaisee

Rabi' bin Hadi 'Umayr al-Madkhali (Arabic: ربيع بن هادي عمير المدخلي, romanized: Rabiʿ bin Hādī ʿUmayr al-Madkhalī; 1933 – 9 July 2025) was a Saudi Arabian Islamic scholar and professor at the Islamic University of Madinah, where he headed the Sunnah Studies Department. He remained active throughout his life in the field of Islamic scholarship and daʿwah. He is most widely known for founding the Madkhali movement. U.S. policymakers and senior advisors to the U.S. Department of State have reportedly advised the U.S. government to fund al-Madkhali and his strain of thought.

== Biography ==
=== Education and career ===
Rabi' al-Madkhali began seeking knowledge in his village Banu Shabil from Ahmad bin Muhammad Jabir Al-Madkhali and Muhammad bin Jabir Al-Madkhali after he turned eight years old. His teacher before his study at the 'Ma’had al-’Ilmi' in Samtah was Nasir Khalufah Mubaraki (one of Abdullah ibn Muhammad Al-Qar’awi's students). After completing several classical Islamic texts with him, he started his education at the Ma’had al-’ilmi in Samtah. The most notable of his teachers were: Hafidh ibn Ahmed Ali al-Hakami, Muhammad bin Ahmad Al-Hakami, Ahmad bin Yahya Al-Najmi, Muhammad Aman Al-Jami' and Muhammad Saghir Al-Khamisi.

In 1961, he entered the Faculty of Sharia at Imam Muhammad ibn Saud Islamic University in Riyadh for two months and then switched to the Faculty of Sharia at the Islamic University of Madinah, where his teachers included former Mufti of Saudi Arabia, Abd al-Aziz ibn Baz, Muhammad Nasiruddin al-Albani, Abdul-Muhsin Al-Abbad, Muhammad Amin Al-Shanqiti, Saleh Al-Iraqi and Abdul-Ghaffar Hasan Al-Hindi. He graduated four years later with excellence. After working at the University, he returned to complete his higher education. He received his master's degree after publishing his thesis, ″Between imams Muslim and Daruqutni″ and achieved his doctorate with distinction with his dissertation. After completing his Doctorate at Umm al-Qura in 1980, Madkhali returned to the Islamic University of Madinah where he taught at the Faculty of Hadith and later became the head of the Department of Sunnah in the Department of Higher Studies. He held the chair until his retirement in the mid-1990s.

Having been an opponent of the House of Saud but then having turned strongly pro-establishment by the early 1990s, the Saudi government promoted al-Madkhali to lead a countermovement against growing criticisms of the Kingdom's socioeconomic ills, late deliveries of farm subsidies and normalization of ties with Israel on the condition of a Palestinian state. After the Gulf War had concluded, Madkhali distributed a booklet justifying the decision of the Saudi Arabian government to allow the presence of U.S. troops on Arabian soil and criticizing rival controversial radical cleric Safar Al-Hawali for the latter's opposition to the government's decision. In 2016, he issued a fatwa calling upon "the Salafis of Libya" to rebel against the UN-recognized Government of National Accord in favor of Khalifa Haftar, who has been described as "Libya's most potent warlord", Haftar had been a secular-leaning figure against the establishment of Sharia in Libya.

== Reception ==
Roel Meijer notes that some analysts view Madkhali's followers as having an obsession with his defense and continuously cite scholarly praise of him as a mechanism "for maintaining, defending and enhancing this authority", which is contested by Madkhali's detractors. Nevertheless, he was praised by fellow scholars such as Ibn Baz, Ibn Uthaymin, al-Wadi'i and al-Albani, who described him as the "imam of criticism and praise" (Arabic: إمام الجرح والتعديل, romanized: Imam al-Jarḥ wa al-Tad’īl), although he himself later rejected the title. He has also received praise from other contemporary Salafist scholars such as Saleh Al-Fawzan, and the former Grand Mufti of Saudi Arabia.

Ibn Jibreen criticized him, saying: "Rabi' al-Madkhali's statements regarding al-Jarh wal-Ta'dil are not acceptable, as he has errors in his books that demonstrate his ignorance or disregard of what he says!..Therefore, their statements about one another are not to be accepted, and we must strive to make peace between them."

Political scientist Gilles Kepel has described Madkhali as being the perfect example of pro-regime "court scholars" in the Middle East, as opposed to more radical trends within the Salafist movement. In contrast to his early opposition to the Saudi Arabian government, Madkhali is now considered one of the Saudi royal family's staunchest defenders. While politically quietest within his own country, Madkhali has supported violent conflict in other areas, having called on Muslims both inside and outside Indonesia to participate in the Maluku sectarian conflict.

Analysts and policymakers in the US noted that covertly backing figures like Madkhali could serve as a short-term countermeasure against militant groups. In a report by CTC Westpoint, an academic institution at the United States Military Academy, Jarret Brachman and William McCants wrote:

The U.S. could discretely fund mainstream Salafi figures like Madkhali who are effective in siphoning off support from jihadis and who do not advocate violence (e.g. by paying for publications, lectures, new schools).

Madkhali's source of religious authority within the Salafist movement is unclear. He has not been involved with official religious bodies of the Saudi government, does not belong to the significant line of 20th-century Salafist scholars including Abd al-Aziz ibn Baz and Muhammad Nasiruddin al-Albani, and has been described as below the level of contemporaries such as Muhammad ibn al Uthaymeen or Saleh Al-Fawzan.

== Students ==
Rabiʿ was known for his works in "al-Jarh wa at-Ta'dil" (criticism and praise). His teachings were widely spread amongst Quietist-Salafist circles. His known students include:

- Mahmud ibn Muhammad al-Haddad
- Abdullah ibn Abdir-Rahim al-Bukhari
- Khalid al-Dhufayri
- Tariq Durman
- Abu Hakim Bilal Davis
- Abdullah al-Lahmami

== Works ==
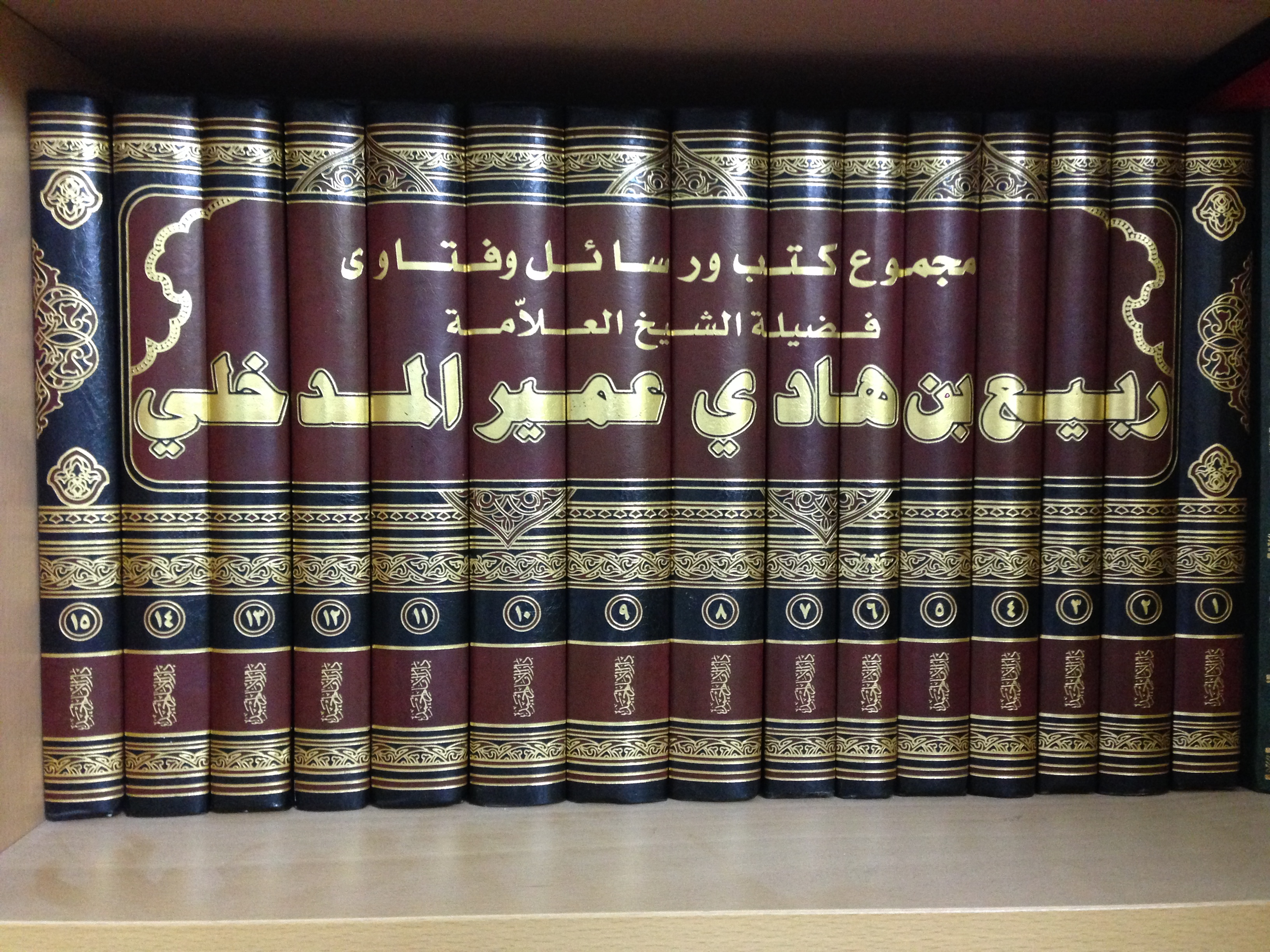
Al-Madkhali's collected works

Rabi' al-Madkhali had authored over 30 works in the field of Hadith and Islamic sciences, much of which has been compiled into a 15 volume set In 1984, the book which brought him fame in the Saudi religious field, 'Manhaj Al-Anbiyah Fi Da’wah Ila Allah' (The Methodology of the Prophets in Calling to Allah), caused controversy over Al-Madkhali's criticisms of the Muslim Brotherhood and their methods in Muslim missionary work. According to Lacroix, Al-Madkhali prioritized correcting Islamic creed and following scholars who hold that abandoning obligations isn't disbelief unless denied-an idea linked to early Murji'ah views, whereas the Muslim Brotherhood's initial focus was on political reform. Some observers state that Al-Madkhali is most noted for his works against Islamic thinker Sayyid Qutb. Of his four books on Sayyid Qutb, 'Adhwa Islamiyyah ala aqidat Sayyid Qutb wa fikrihi' is considered the most important. His other authorships include:

- “Bainal-Imāmain Muslim Wad-Daruqutnī” – “Between the Two Imams: Muslim and Ad-Dar Qutni.” And this was one large volume which was the thesis of his Magistrates degree.
- “An-Nukat ‘Ala Kitāb Ibn Salāh” – “Points Upon the Book of Ibn Salāh.” Published in 2 volumes and it was his PhD thesis.
- “Manhajul-Anbiyā’ Fid-Da’wah IlAllāh Fīhī Al-Hikmah Wal-‘Aql” – “The Methodology of the Prophets in Calling to Allāh: In it was Wisdom and Intellect”
- “Manhaj Ahlus-Sunnah Fī Naqd Ar-Rijāl Wal-Kutub Wat–Tawā’if” – “The Methodology of The People of Sunnah in Criticism of Men, Books, and Groups.”
- “Kashf Mawqif Al-Ghazālī Min As-Sunnah Wa-Ahlihā” – “Exposing Ghazālī’s Position Regarding the Sunnah and Its People.”
- “Makānatu Ahlil-Hadīth” – “The Position of the People of Hadīth”
- “Manhaj Al-Imām Muslim Fī Tartībi Sahīhihī” – “Al-Imām Muslim's Method in Ordering his Sahīh.”
- “Adhwā’ Islāmiyyah ‘Alā ‘Aqīdah Sayyid Qutb wa Fikarihī” – “The Illumination of Islām Regarding the Creed of Sayyid Qutb and his Ideas.”
- “Matā’in Sayyid Qutb fī As-hābi Rasūlillāh SallAllāhu Alaihi wa Sallam” – “The Slanders of Sayyid Qutb Upon the Companions of the Messenger of Allāh (H).”
- “Al-Hadd Al-Fāsil Bainal-Haqq Wal-Bātil” – “The Distinct Separation Between Truth and Falsehood,” which was part of critical dialogue between him and Bakr Abū Zaid
- “Jamā’ah Wāhidah Lā Jamā’āt; Wa Sīrat Wāhid Lā ‘Asharāt” – “One Jamā’ah – Not Many Jamā’ahs; and One Path – Not Tens of Paths,” which was part of a critical dialogue with ‘Abdur-Rahmān ‘Abdul-Khāliq.

== Death ==
Rabīʿal-Madkhali died in Madinah on 9 July 2025, at the age of 92. His janazah was performed after Fajr, at the Prophet's Masjid in Madinah on 10 July. It was led by Khaled al-Muhanna, an imam of the Prophet's Mosque. His will stresses adherence to the Quran, Sunnah, and the path of the early generations as essential for the Ummah’s success.
