= Banu Shabil =

Saudi Arabian tribe

Banū Shabīl بنو شبيل
- Adnanite Arabs
- Ethnicity: Arab
- Nisba: al-Shabīlī
- Location: Jazan Region of Saudi Arabia
- Descended from: Shabīl ibn La'idd
- Religion: Sunni Islam

The Banū Shabīl (Arabic: بنو شبيل) are an Adnanite Arab tribe that live in Saudi Arabia. They currently inhabit the Jazan Region and are mainly located in the town of Samtah in the same region.

== Tribal lineage ==
The lineage of Banu Shabil is traced back to a man named Shabil ibn La'idd. His full genealogical lineage has been given as; Shabil, son of La'idd, son of 'Amir, son of 'Ubayd, son of Imran, son of Rabi'ah, son of 'Abs, son of Shaharah, son of Ghalib, son of 'Abd Allah, son of 'Akk, son of Adnan. This lineage confirmed that the tribe was an Adnanite tribe. However, the modern genealogist Aateq Al-Balady disagreed and stated that the Banu Shabil were a Qahtanite tribe from the Banu al-Hakam confederation.

== Location ==
In the modern age, the members of the Banu Shabil reside in the Jazan Region in Saudi Arabia, their presence centred around the historic town of Samtah in that region. They are neighbours of the Banu Hamad, Banu Marwan and Banu al-Hakam tribes who also live in that area.

== Descendants ==
=== Al-Mudakhala family ===
The Al-Mudakhala (Arabic: المداخلة) are a family and tribal clan in Saudi Arabia descended from both the Banu Shabil and its fellow Adnanite tribe, the Banu Tamim. The Salafist thinker and Islamic scholar Rabee al-Madkhali belonged to the family of Al-Mudakhala. Other members of the family include Muslim scholar Muhammad bin Hadi al-Madkhali and Saudi journalist Khaled al-Madakhali.

== See also ==
- Tribes of Arabia
