= Muhammad Aman al-Jami =

Ethiopian-Salafi scholar and writer

Sheikh Dr. Muhammad Aman al-Jami
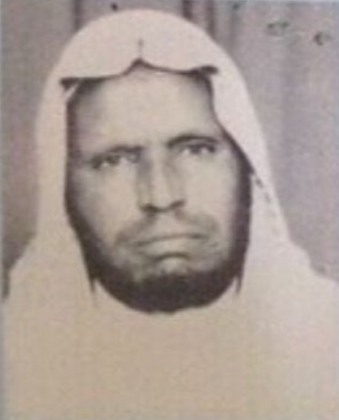
- Muhammad al-Jami
- Title: Abu Ahmad

Personal life
- Born: Muḥammad Aman ibn Ali al-Jami; 30 November 1930 Tughā Tāb, Harari, Ethiopia
- Died: January 17, 1996 (aged 65) King Fahd Hospital, Madinah, Saudi Arabia
- Occupation: Cleric, Professor
- Website: eljame.com

Religious life
- Religion: Islam
- Denomination: Sunni
- Jurisprudence: Shafi'i
- Creed: Athari
- Movement: Salafism

Muslim leader
- Influenced by: Al-Shafi'i, Muhammad al-Bukhari, Ibn Taymiyya, Abdul-Rahman al-Sa'di, Ibn Baz
- Influenced: Rabi' al-Madkhali, Salih al-Fawzan, Bakr Abu Zayd, Muhammad Sa'id Raslan

YouTube information
- Channel: فضيلة الشيخ محمد أمان الجامي
- Genre: Islamic
- Subscribers: 22,000
- Views: 865,829
- Last updated: 22 June 2026

Muhammad Aman al-Jami, also known as Abu Ahmad, was an Ethiopian-Salafi scholar who taught in Saudi Arabia.

== Early life and education ==
Al-Jami completed secondary school at the Educational Institute of Riyadh. Following this, he enrolled in its College of Shariah, from which he graduated in 1960. In 1974, he earned his master's degree in Shariah from the University of Punjab in Lahore, Pakistan. Soon after, he completed a doctorate in Shariah from Dar al-Uloom, Cairo University.

== Biography ==
=== Life in Ethiopia ===
Al-Jami was born on November 30, 1930, in Harari Province, Ethiopia. He began his Islamic Education by memorizing the Quran. After this, he began to learn Islamic Jurisprudence in the Shafi'i madhhab and studied the Arabic language with Shaykh Muhammad Amin al-Harari. After these studies, he left his home village and migrated to a nearby village where he met Sheikh Abdul-Karim al-Ethiopi. The two of them then attended the lectures of Sheikh Musa al-Ethiopi in the village and studied the book "Nudhum al-Zuhd" by Ibn Raslan with him and Minhaj al-Talibeen by Imam al-Nawawi with Sheikh Abadir al-Ethiopi.

=== Migration to Saudi Arabia ===
Following these events, al-Jami and Abdul-Karim began a journey to migrate to Saudi Arabia. They left their village and traveled to Somalia, where they boarded a ship towards Aden, Yemen. After reaching Yemen, they travelled on foot until they reached Hudaibah, where they fasted the Month of Ramadan. After this, they continued on foot until they reached Makkah.

=== Life in Saudi Arabia ===
After arriving in Makkah in 1949, al-Jami completed the Hajj pilgrimage and started studying in the classes of Masjid al-Haram where he was introduced to the Salafi Movement. Here, he also met the Saudi scholar, Ibn Baz, with whom he travelled to Riyadh to study in its Islamic Educational Institute in the early 1950s. There, he studied alongside Abdul-Muhsin al-Abbad and Ali al-Muhanna, a former supreme judge of Madinah. He also studied with and spent time with the former Grand Mufti of Saudi Arabia, Muhammad ibn Ibrahim.

Some scholars he benefitted from are:

- Sheikh Muhammad ibn Ibrahim
- Sheikh Abd al-Rahman al-Afriqi
- Sheikh Abd al-Aziz ibn Baz
- Sheikh Muhammad al-Amin al-Shanqiti
- Sheikh Abd al-Razzaq Afifi
- Sheikh Abdul-Rahman al-Sa'di
- Sheikh Muhammad Khalil Harras
- Sheikh Abdullah al-Qarawi

== Students ==
From the students that al-Jami taught and influenced include and are not limited to:

- Sheikh Rabi' al-Madkhali
- Sheikh Zayd ibn Hadi al-Madkhali
- Sheikh Ali Nasir Faqihi
- Sheikh Salih al-Suhaymi
- Sheikh Bakr Abu Zayd

== Works ==
He is a prominent author and lecturer, who has written books such as:

- As-Sifaat-ul-Ilaahiyyah fil-Kitaab was-Sunnah an-Nabawiyyah fee Daw-il-Ithbaat wat-Tanzeeh
- Adwaa alaa Tareeq ad-Dawah ilaal-Islaam
- Al-Muhaadarah ad-Difaaiyyah an-is-Sunnah al-Muhammadiyyah
- Haqeeqat-ud-Dimuqratiyyah wa annahaa laisat minal-Islaam
- Haqeeqat-ush-Shooraa fil-Islaam
- Al-Aqeedat-ul-Islaamiyyah wa Taareekhuhaa
- Nidhaam-ul-Usrah fil-Islaam

Books that he has explained and taught are:

- Tajreed al-Tawheed (by Al-Maqrizi)
- Usool al-Thalatha (by Muhammad ibn Abdul-Wahhab)
- Shurut al-Salah (by Muhammad ibn Abdul-Wahhab)
- Usool al-Sitta (by Muhammad ibn Abdul-Wahhab)
- al-Aqeedah al-Tadmuriyyah (by Ibn Taymiyyah)
- al-Qawaid al-Muthlaa (by al-Uthaymin)

== See also ==
- Rabi' al-Madkhali
- Muhammad Sa'id Raslan
- List of Atharis
