= Islamic Fiqh Academy =

Islamic Fiqh Academy may refer to:

- International Islamic Fiqh Academy, Jeddah
- Islamic Fiqh Academy, India
