= Makkah Document =

The Makkah Document, formed on 20 October 2006, calls to take practical steps to end the sectarian violence, included forming committees in various areas in Iraq and organising seminars of Sunni and Shia religious leaders and scholars.

The beginning of the Makkah Document was marked with Senior Shiite and Sunni leaders in Iraq starting talks to end sectarian conflict in their homeland. About 24 leaders took part in the two-day meeting held near Haram Mosque in Jeddah, Saudi Arabia under the auspices of the Organisation of the Islamic Conference (OIC) and the International Islamic Fiqh Academy, an offshoot of the OIC. The Makkah Document is supposed to be a religious agreement rather than a political one, being based on the teaches of the Quran and Muhammad. The Iraqi prime minister has backed the conference, even though it is not a political one.

The absence of top Shiite spiritual leader Grand Ayatollah Ali Al Sistani, remained conspicuous at the meeting. However, Al Sistani pledged full support for the meeting.
