= Abdul-Muhsin al-Abbad =

Islamic scholar

Sheikh Dr. Abdul-Muhsin al-Abbad
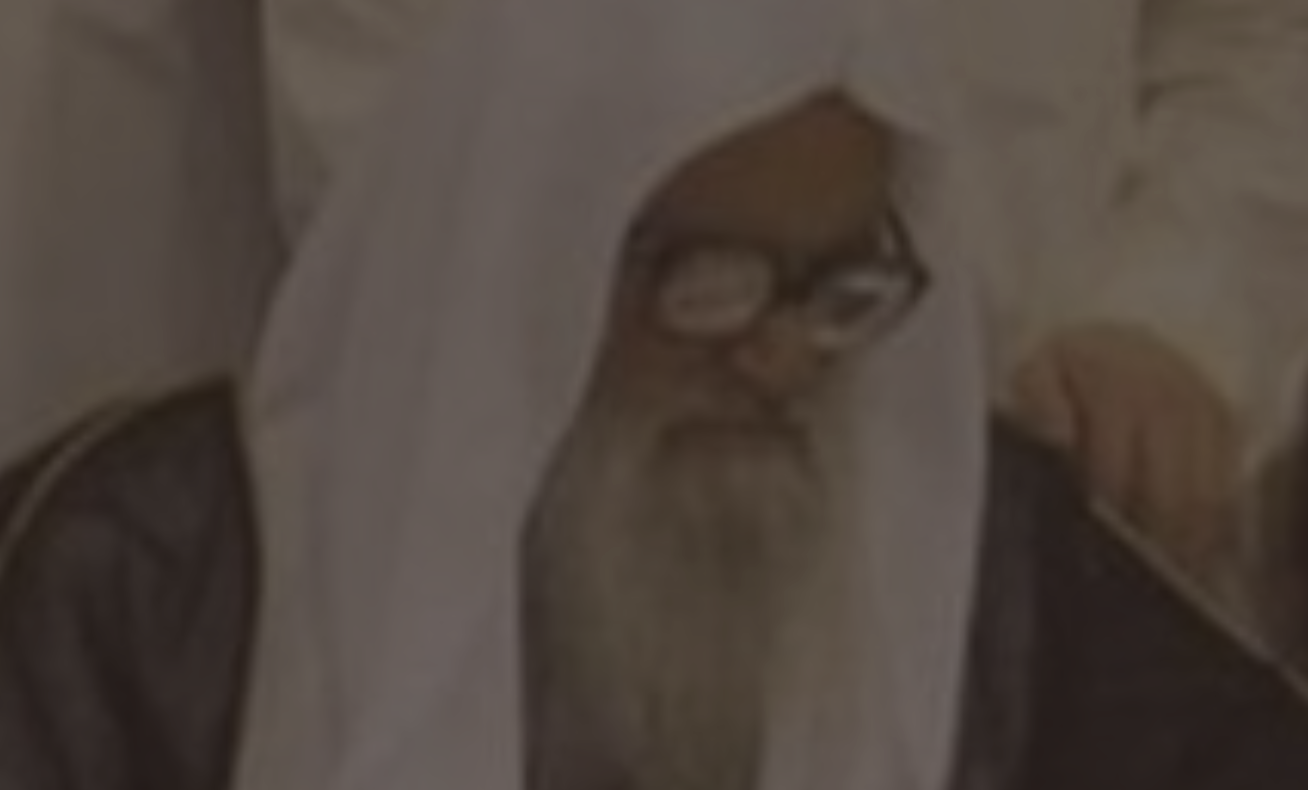

Personal life
- Born: Abdul-Muhsin al-Abbad ibn Hamad ibn Abdul-Muhsin ibn Abdullah ibn Hamad ibn Uthman al-Badr; April 1934 (age 92) Al-Zulfi City, Riyadh Province, Saudi Arabia
- Children: Abdur-Razzaq al-Badr
- Education: Imam Mohammad Ibn Saud Islamic University
- Occupation: Cleric, Professor
- Website: al-abbaad.com

Religious life
- Religion: Islam
- Denomination: Sunni
- Jurisprudence: Hanbali
- Creed: Athari
- Movement: Salafism

Muslim leader
- Influenced by: Ahmad ibn Hanbal, Ibn Taymiyya, Ibn al-Qayyim, Ibn Baz, al-Uthaymin

Abdul-Muhsin al-Abbad is a Salafi Islamic scholar from Saudi Arabia. He is a former professor of the Islamic University of Madinah and is considered to be one of the foremost muhaddiths of the 20th and 21st centuries.

== Early life and education ==
al-Abbad was born in April 1934 in al-Zulfi City, Saudi Arabia. There, he completed his early education and learned to read and write. From there, he moved to Riyadh where he studied at an Islamic Educational Institute. Coincidentally, Shaykh Ibn Baz happened to join the institute as a teacher at the same time as Shaykh Abdul-Muhsin. There, he was peers with Shaykh Muhammad Aman al-Jami. After graduation, he attended Mohammad Ibn Saud Islamic University where he enrolled in the college of Shariah. During his senior year, he started working in the Educational Center in Buraydah City. While in Riyadh, he studied under Muhammad ibn Ibrahim, Ibn Baz, and Muhammad al-Amin al-Shinqiti. When the Islamic University of Madinah was opened, he was selected to teach as a professor in the College of Shariah. He spent 15 years at the university being a part of the university's head committee and being vice president of the school for 2 years and then president for 4 years followed by his own resignation as president. He was also known to have added over 500,000 manuscripts and scholarly references to the Islamic University's library during his time as president.

He was also known for teaching in Masjid al-Haram and Masjid al-Nabawi regularly until his retirement on December 9, 2022.

== Works ==
- Twenty Hadiths from Al-Bukhari
- Twenty Hadiths from Sahih Muslim
- Aspects of the Noble Prophet's Character
- The Creed of Ahl al-Sunnah wal-Jama’ah Regarding the Noble Companions
- The Virtue and Exalted Status of Ahl al-Bayt (the Prophet's Family) According to Ahl al-Sunnah wal-Jama’ah
- The Creed of Ahl al-Sunnah wal-Athar Regarding the Awaited Mahdi
- A Refutation of Al-Rifa’i and Al-Bouti
- Defending the Righteous Companions: A Refutation of the Falsehoods of Hassan Al-Maliki
- Sheikh Abdul Aziz bin Baz: A Model from the Early Generation
- Sheikh Omar bin Abdul Rahman Fallatah: A Personal Account of How I Came to Know Him
- Sincerity, Ihsan (Excellence in Faith), and Adherence to Sharia
- The Virtues of Medina and the Etiquette of Residing in and Visiting It
- Statements by Fair-Minded Scholars Regarding Mu’awiyah
- The Virtues of Ahl al-Bayt
- Harvesting the Fruit: A Study of Hadith Terminology (Mustalah al-Hadith)
- A Profound Scholar and an Exceptional King
- Glimpses of Islamic Guidance
- A Study of the Hadith "May Allah Radiate the Face of a Person Who Hears My Words...": A Critical Analysis of Narration and Meaning

== Personal life ==
He is the father of Shaykh Abdur-Razzaq al-Badr.
