= Abdul Ghaffar Hasan =

Pakistani scholar (1913–2007)

Abdul-Ghaffar Hassan (20 July 1913 - 22 March 2007) was an Islamic scholar and hadith scholar born in Umarpur, India, near Delhi in 1913. Upon the partition of India in 1947 he chose to migrate to the newly founded nation of Pakistan. Hassan died in 2007.

Hassan was involved with the Jamaat-e-Islami Hind from 1941 to 1957 but eventually left due to differences with Abul Ala Maududi regarding the means and ways in which the Islamic state should be established. Maududi was in favor of utilizing elections to achieve his aim while Hassan demanded it be accomplished via educating the masses about their religion. This belief Hassan held in opposition to Maududi would become popularized later on by Muhammad Nasiruddin al-Albani.

== Works ==
Abdul-Ghaffar Hassan has written more than ten books in Urdu including:

- The Rights and Duties of Women in Islam. Darussalam. 2006. ISBN 978-9960-897-51-6.
- The Way of the Prophet: A Selection of Hadith. Markfield: Kube Publishing Ltd. 2010. ISBN 978-0-86037-424-4.
