= Koutoub Moustapha Sano =

Guinean politician

Sano Koutoub Moustapha
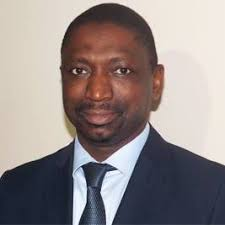
- Born: 10 April 1966; Kankan, Guinea
- Occupation: Politician
- Title: Dato (2007)
- Awards: Datuk (Malaysia)

Koutoub Moustapha Sano (born April 10, 1966) is a politician and academic from Guinea. He served as minister of the office of the president of Guinea and diplomatic advisor to the president. He holds a doctorate in law.

== Biography ==
He was born in Kankan, Guinea, the son of Elhadj Sidafa Sano and Hadja Aissata Koma.

== Education ==
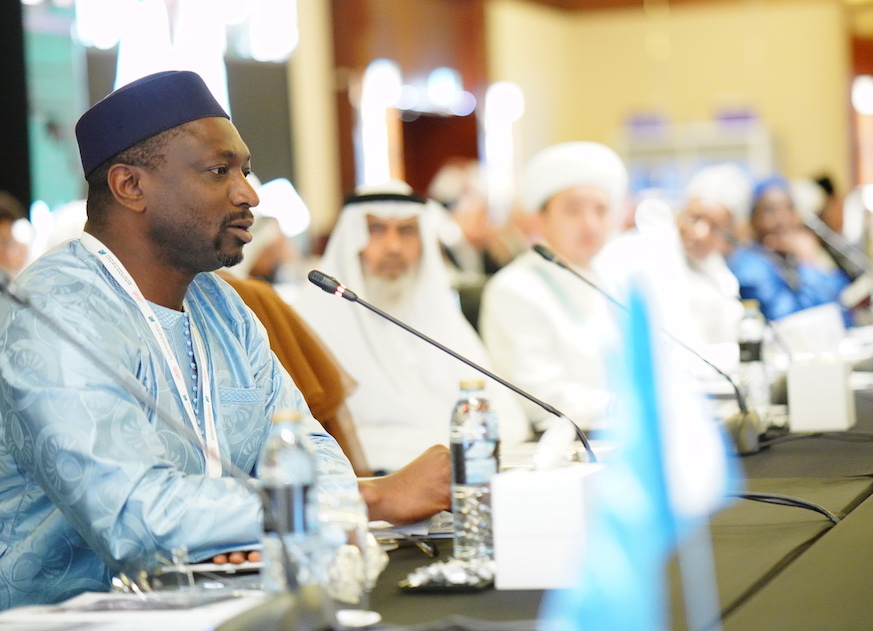
3rd IIFA conference in Medina (Saudi Arabia) in 2018

- In 1989 he obtained an in-depth diploma in the French language from the Ministry of Education of the Republic of France.
- Bachelor's degree in education (Comparative Law) in 1990, then a master's degree in comparative law with distinction at the King Saud University in 1993.
- Doctorate in philosophy of comparative law at the International University of Malaysia in 1996
- He obtained a graduate degree in banking and Islamic finance from the International Islamic University Malaysia in 1998.
- In 2001, he obtained a doctorate in Islamic finance with honors from the University of Zaitouna in Tunisia.

== Honors and awards ==
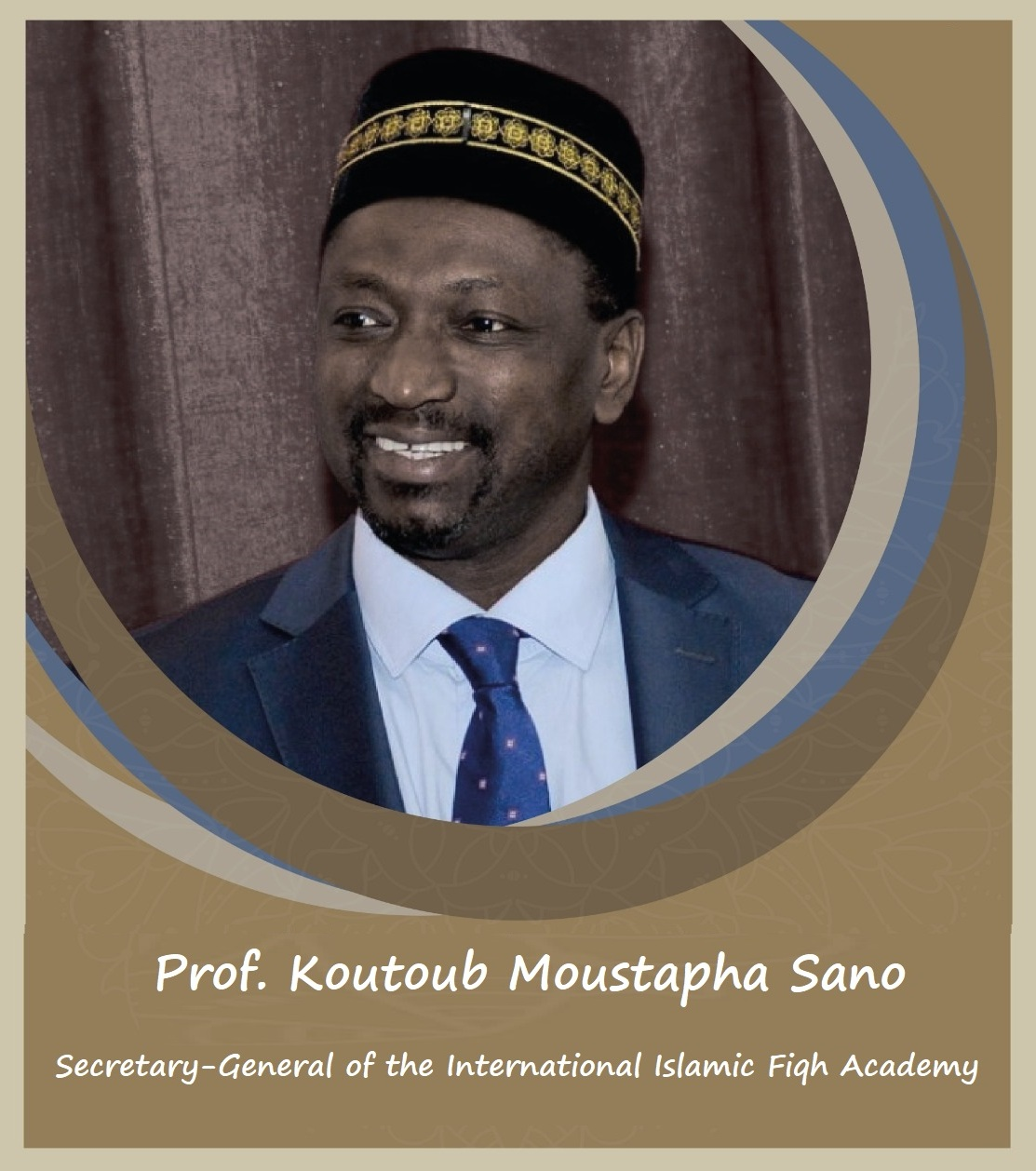

- Best student of King Saud University in Riyadh in 1989.
- Received 25 gold medals in various university competitions in Saudi Arabia.
- The Favorite Personality of Guineans for the years 2012–2013.
- The Best Minister of the Republic of Guinea 2012–2015.

While he was deputy rector (2005–2009) in charge of internationalization and innovation at the International Islamic University Malaysia, the former Sultan of Pahang, now King of Malaysia (2019-), conferred on him the honorific title of Dato in 2007.

== Professional career ==
In October 2020, he took office of secretary-general of the International Islamic Fiqh Academy after having held for a dozen years several posts at the Academy of Jurisprudence in Jeddah. From 1993 to 2009, he was professor of comparative law and Islamic finance at IIUM. From 2005 to 2009 served as deputy rector for internationalisation and innovation at the International Islamic University Malaysia. He served as the Minister of Religious Affairs of the Republic of Guinea from 2009 to 2010, Minister of International Cooperation and African Integration from 2011 to 2016, chairman of the Council of Ministers of the Mano River Union from 2014 to 2015. Appointed as diplomatic advisor to the president of the Republic of Guinea from March 18, 2016, until now.
