= Ministry of African Cooperation and Integration =

Government ministry of Guinea

- Ministère de la Coopération et de l'Intégration africaine (French)

Ministry overview
- Jurisdiction: Government of Guinea
- Headquarters: Conakry
- Minister responsible: Amadou Thierno Diallo, Minister of African Cooperation and Integration

The Ministry of African Cooperation and Integration (MCIA, French: Ministère de la Coopération et de l'Intégration africaine) is a Guinean government ministry whose most recent minister is Amadou Thierno Diallo. It is headquartered in Conakry.

The MCIA is responsible for coordinating with other nations in Africa as well as with the United Nations.

The ministry is associated with the Ministry of Foreign Affairs, International Cooperation, African Integration and Guineans abroad (French: Ministère des affaires étrangères, de la coopération internationale, de l'Intégration africaine et des guinéens de l'étranger).

== Officeholders since 2010 ==
Name	Dates in Office		Government(s)	Source
Koutoubou Moustapha Sano	2011	2016	Government of Said Fofana Youla Government	
Djènè Keita	26/05/2018	15/01/2021	Kassory Government I	
Amadou Thierno Diallo	19/03/2021	05/09/2021	Kassory Government II	
