= Umarpur =

- Village
- Location in Punjab, India Umarpur (India)
- Coordinates: 31.0437147°N 75.6042051°E
- Country: India
- State: Punjab
- District: Jalandhar

Government
  - Type: Panchayat raj
  - Body: Gram panchayat
- Elevation: 240 m (790 ft)

Population (2011)
  - Total: 1,163
- Sex ratio 595/568 ♂/♀

Languages
  - Official: Punjabi
- Time zone: UTC+5:30 (IST)
- PIN: 144039
- Telephone: 01821
- ISO 3166 code: IN-PB
- Posta office: Nurmahal
- Website: jalandhar.nic.in

Umarpur is a village in Jalandhar district of Punjab State, India. It is located 6.7 km from postal head office in Nurmahal, 26 km from Phillaur, 35 km from district headquarter Jalandhar and 146 km from state capital Chandigarh. The village is administrated by a sarpanch, who is an elected representative.

== Demography ==
As of the 2011 Census of India, the village has 238 houses and a population of 1163, comprising 595 are males and 568 females. The literacy rate of the village was 79.48%, higher than state average of 75.84%. The population of children under the age of 6 years was 120 and the child sex ratio was approximately 935, which was higher than the state average of 846.

Most of the people were from the Schedule Castes, who constituted 62.34% of the population; there were no people designated as members of Schedule Tribes.

As per census 2011, 379 people were engaged in work activities out of the total population of the village which includes 363 males and 16 females. According to census survey report 2011, 89.45% workers describe their work as main work and 10.55% workers are involved in marginal activity providing livelihood for less than 6 months.

== Transport ==
Nurmahal railway station is the nearest train station. The larger Phillaur Junction station is 24.4 km away from the village. The village is 54.5 km away from domestic airport in Ludhiana and the nearest international airport is located in Chandigarh also Sri Guru Ram Dass Jee International Airport is the second nearest airport which is 127 km away in Amritsar.
