= Al-Zulfi =

Governorate in Riyadh Province, Saudi Arabia

Al-Zulfi الزلفي
- Governorate
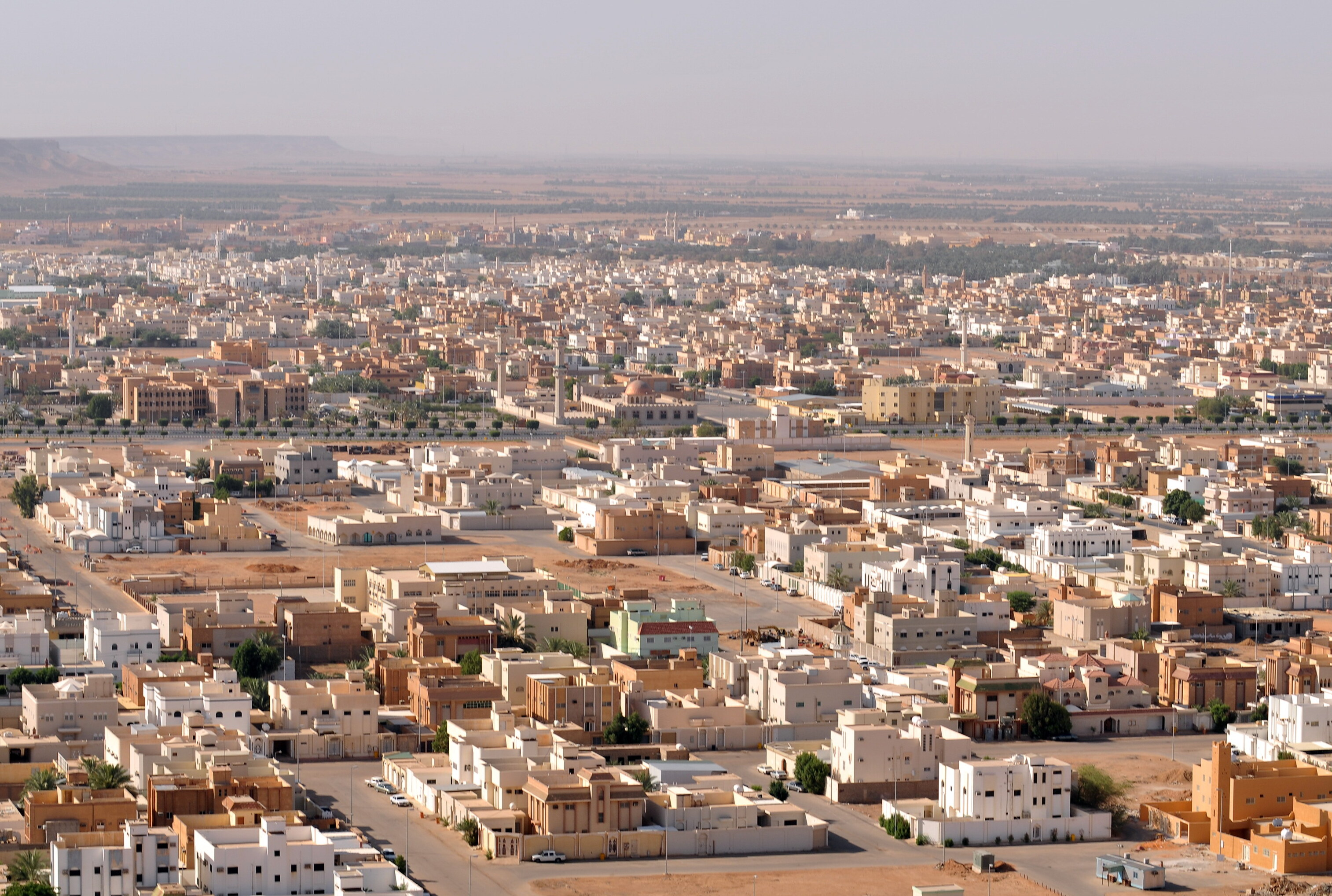
- Al-Zulfi City

- Location of Al-Zulfi Governorate within Riyadh Province

- Location within Saudi Arabia
- Country: Saudi Arabia
- Province: Riyadh Province
- Region: Najd
- Seat: Al-Zulfi City

Government
  - Type: Municipality
  - Body: Al-Zulfi Municipality

Area
  - Total: 5,540 km^{2} (2,140 sq mi)

Population (2022)
  - Total: 74,903
  - Density: 13.5/km^{2} (35.0/sq mi)
- Time zone: UTC+03:00 (SAST)
- ISO 3166-2: SA-01
- Area code: 011

Al-Zulfi (Arabic: الزلفي) is a governorate in Riyadh Province, Saudi Arabia. The governorate covers an area of approximately 5,540 km^{2} (2,140 sq mi) and had a population of 74,903 according to the 2022 census. Al-Zulfi is associated with the Battle of Sabilla, which played a major part in the unification of Saudi Arabia.

== History ==
Al-Zulfi is associated with the Battle of Sabilla fought in 1929 at Rawdat Sabilla. The battle was fought between the forces of King Ibn Saud and the Ikhwan militia, and played a major part in the unification of Saudi Arabia before the proclamation of the Kingdom of Saudi Arabia in 1932. The governorate was subject to a drone attack during the war in the Middle East in March 2026.

== Geography ==
Al-Zulfi is one of the 22 governorates of Riyadh Province in the Najd region of central Saudi Arabia. The governorate covers an area of approximately 5,540 km^{2} (2,140 sq mi). The Tuwaiq Mountains extend from the north of the Al-Zulfi governorate, and the governorate has the highest elevation in Riyadh province at 600 m (2,000 ft) above sea level. Al-Zulfi is located about 320 km (200 miles) northeast of Riyadh.

== Demographics and economy ==
According to the 2010 census, the governorate had a population of 69,336 inhabitants, which increased to 74,903 in 2022. The population consisted of 44,805 males and 30,098 females. Majority of the population (68,317) resided in Al-Zulfi City. About 30% of the population of the governorate were non-Saudi citizens.

Al-Zulfi is one of the major date palm growing regions in Saudi Arabia. Several varieties of dates are cultivated in the governorate. The Zulfi Chamber of Commerce and Industry is a non-profit organisation which supports commercial establishments and businesses in Al-Zulfi Governorate.

== See also ==
- Provinces of Saudi Arabia
- List of cities and towns in Saudi Arabia
