= Bakr Abu Zayd =

20th and 21st-century Saudi Arabian cleric

Personal life
- Born: 1 January 1944 Dawadmi, Najd, Saudi Arabia.
- Died: 5 February 2008 (aged 64) Riyadh, Saudi Arabia
- Resting place: Al Diriyah Cemetery, Diriyah
- Region: Middle East
- Main interest(s): Sharia, Fiqh, Hadith
- Occupation: President of International Islamic Fiqh Academy (1985-2008)

Religious life
- Religion: Islam
- Denomination: Sunni
- Jurisprudence: Hanbali
- Creed: Athari
- Movement: Salafism

Muslim leader
- Influenced by: Ahmad bin Hanbal, Ibn Qudama, Ibn Taymiyya, Ibn al-Qayyim, Muhammad ibn Abd al-Wahhab, Muhammad al-Amin al-Shinqiti

Bakr Abu Zayd (Arabic: بكر بن عبد الله أبو زيد) (born~ 1944 – 5 February 2008) from the tribe of Banu Zayd of Quda'a, was a Saudi Arabian Islamic scholar, a leading proponent of the Salafi form of Islam and a member of both the Saudi Council of Senior Scholars and the Permanent Committee for Islamic Research and Issuing Fatwas. He was a student of Muhammad al-Amin al-Shinqiti. From 1985 to 2008, he served as the President of the International Islamic Fiqh Academy.

== Education ==
Bakr attended Saudi public schools until the second year of elementary school, and then in 1955 he moved to Riyadh where he continued his elementary studies. Later, he joined the Educational Institute, and graduated from the Faculty of Shari`ah at Imam University as an associate with first class honors in 1966. In 1979, he studied at the High Judicial Institute of Saudi Arabia as an associate, where he achieved a master's degree. He later received his Doctorate in 1982 from the same institute.

== Career ==
In 1964, he moved to Madinah, where he worked as a librarian in the General Library of the Islamic University of Madinah. In 1966, he was selected as a judge in the Legal system of Saudi Arabia, whereby a Saudi Royal Decree was issued to appoint him. He continued in this post until 1979 when a decree was issued by the Council of Ministers selecting him as general procurator for the Ministry of Justice. In 1991, he was appointed as a member of the Saudi Council of Senior Scholars and the Permanent Committee for Islamic Research and Issuing Fatwas.

== Death ==
Bakr died on Tuesday 5 February 2008 and was buried at Al Diriyah Cemetery, Diriyah.
