= Banu al-Hakam =

Banu Al-Hakam بنو الحكم
- Location: Saudi Arabia, Yemen
- Parent tribe: Ibn Saad Alasheera which is from Madh'hij
- Religion: Sunni Islam

Banu Al-Hakam (Arabic: بنو الحكم) (Sons of Al-Hakam). Al-Hakam Ibn Saad Alasheera Ibn Madh'hij is an Arabian tribe descended from Madh'hij tribe. Al-Hakam had governed Jazan which was known as Al-Mekhlaf Al-Suleimani Jazan.

== Mekhlaf Bani al-Hakam ==
It is five days in the valleys of Hamdan and Khulan, which is attributed to the tribe of Al-Hakam Ibn Saad Alasheera, one of the tribes of Madh'hij, whose base is the city of adversaries on the side of Wadi Khalb. And his kingship from the rule of the family of Abdul-Jad in the Jaahiliyyah and then Islam. The cities of Al-Hajar, Al-Khazaf, Al-Hadid, Al-Saqfatin, Al-Sharjat, Sahlah, Al-Haridah, Al-Mahdah, Wadi Al-Haid, Wadi Ta'shar, Wadi Juhafan, Wadi Liya, Wadi Khalb, Wadi Zayra, Wadi Zhabah, Samad, Jazan and Sabia. And his kings from the mention of the rulers and then the family of Abduljadid.

Its borders: This section extends from the valley of Sabaya to the north to the valleys of Abs southward. Al-Hamdani (344 AH), which lists the valleys of Tihama, says: "It is called Wadi Mor, and Adaya, Bani Abas, of Hadam, and Wadi Hiran and Khazlan." These valleys are south of Haradh, within the territory of the Republic of Yemen. Thus, the ancient boundaries of the rule of the rule exceeded the Harad or (Al-Sharja) to include Abs.

Damad (Arabic: ضمد) is a great valley in which many villages are populated and attributed to the Zaid bin Yazid ibn al-Harith ibn 'Ula ibn Jahl ibn Madh'hij. The forearm of the land of the rule of the son of Saad, the village of Lahqam, and the two villages, the village of Balad, ruled over the valley of Khaleb, and it was by them, and with the help of the rulers of the rule of the sons of Abd al-Jad. Then the abandonment of the village of Damad and Jazan, and in the country of the rule of many villages said to be a scout and a boy and then Pish and the pro-Quraish and Sahlh found a great market that would weigh the Arabs and say they found and to Haza, and also on the coast of the sea.
