= Al-Zulfi City =

City in Riyadh Province, Saudi Arabia

Al-Zulfi City مدينة الزلفي
- City
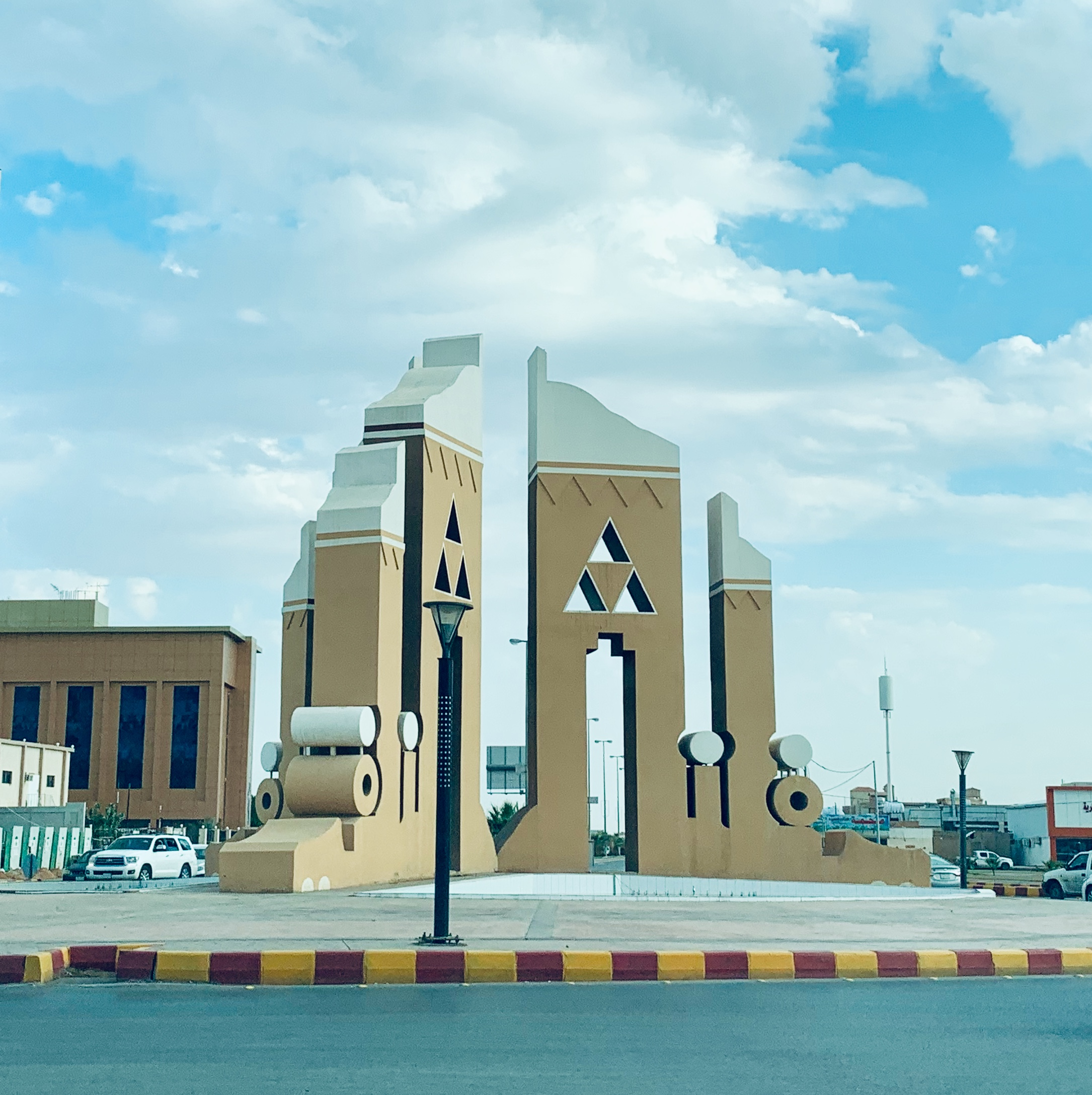

- Flag Seal

- Location within Saudi Arabia
- Coordinates: 26°18′0″N 44°48′0″E
- Country: Saudi Arabia
- Province: Riyadh Province
- Governorate: Al Zulfi

Government
  - Governor: Faihan bin Abdulaziz bin Libdeh
- Elevation: 600 m (2,000 ft)

Population
  - Total: 68,317
- Time zone: UTC+3

Al-Zulfi is the most populous city in the Al-Zulfi Governorate, which encompasses the Al-Zulfi Emirate of Riyadh Province within the Kingdom of Saudi Arabia. It is situated in the center of the governorate, on the periphery of Shuaib Samnan, between the Tuwaiq Mountains and the sand dunes of Nafud al-Thuwairat. The city's population is 68,317.

== Name ==
The etymology of the name Al-Zulfi is unclear, with multiple proposed explanations. One hypothesis suggests that it derives from the name Al-Zlifat, derived from the Tuwaiq Mountains, which were thought to be the source of the name. However, Ibn Khamis offers an alternate interpretation. It has been proposed that the term 'Zulfi' refers to the villages that surround Al-Zulfi, as documented by Ibn Balihad. Additionally, some have proposed that the term originated from Izdelaf, an Arabic word denoting movement from one location to another. In his dictionary, Ibn Balihad stated: "I am aware of the location referred to by al-Hatti'ah in this verse, which is identified as Zalifat in relation to its geographical position and the surrounding villages". These are known as the city of Al-Zulfi, also known as Zlifat, which has been referenced in both Arabic poetry and historical texts. It retains this designation to this day.

== History ==
Al-Zulfi is a frequently referenced location in Arabic poetry and literature, and archaeological evidence indicates the presence of human activity in the area dating back to the Stone Age. In the third century AH, Al-Isfahani noted that Al-Zulfi was a member of the Bani Tamim of Mudar from the Adnan tribe. Al-Hattiha is regarded as one of the most prominent poets of satire.

=== Historical events ===
In the year 1098 A.H., the Al Muhaddith of Bani Al Anbar from Tamim successfully overthrew the Farahid of Alaqa. This was despite the fact that the latter had previously expelled them with the assistance of Al Madlaj.

In the year 1113 AH, Al Rashid, the proprietor of Al-Zulfi and Al Asyah, assumed control of Al-Zulfi and expelled the Al Madlaj, who had previously occupied it.

In the year 1128 AH, Hamad bin Othman, a shepherd from Al Majmaa, perpetrated a robbery against Al-Rashid in Al-Zulfi.

In the year 1164 AH, Abdulaziz bin Muhammad Al Saud spearheaded an incursion against Al-Zulfi, situated at Al-Hasi water, and directed Abdullah bin Abdul Rahman to spearhead the incursion.

In the year 1165 of the Islamic calendar, Abdulaziz bin Muhammad Al Saud, known as Faisal, arrived in Sudair, Munikh (Majma'ah), Al-Zulfi, Wusham, and Dhafir. He was accompanied by Faisal bin Faisal and proceeded to conquer the villages of Ragha and Mahmal.

In the year 1165 A.H., the Battle of Rawdat Al-Sabla was fought against Al-Dhafeer from the Banu Khalid, led by Abdullah bin Turki bin Muhammad bin Hussein Al-Hamid. Al-Dhafir was ultimately defeated.

In the year 1167 A.H., Abdulaziz bin Muhammad Al Saud launched an incursion into Al-Zulfi from Al-Kharj, yet failed to assume control.

1174 A.H. Imam Abdul Aziz stole the sheep of the people of Al-Zulfi, and they caught up with him and recovered them.

In the year 1182 A.H., King Saud bin Abdulaziz of Saudi Arabia launched an initial invasion of Zulfi, subsequently advancing to Sabeel at Hayer Nasah and Al Marra at Qana, situated to the north of Al Duhi.

1186 A.H. Al-Zulfi and Majma'a rebelled against Saud.

In the year 1188 A.H., King Saud bin Abdulaziz dispatched a military unit under the command of Adama bin Suwairi, a member of the Bani Hussein tribe, to Al-Zulfi. Upon arrival, the unit encountered an incursion by the local population, resulting in the complete annihilation of the enemy forces.

In the year 1188 of the Islamic calendar, Saud bin Aryar launched an assault on Al-Zulfi and Al-Qassim, which was met with resistance from supporters of the Al-Saud family and Sheikh Muhammad bin Abdul Wahhab.

In the year 1190 of the Islamic calendar, the Al-Saud camp was reinforced by the populace of Al-Zulfi and Munikh (Majmaa).

In the year 1193 AH, Saadun ibn Areeer formed an alliance with the residents of Harama and Al-Zulfi with the objective of launching an attack on Majma'a, the center of the Al-Saud's supporters.

In the year 1194 AH, Saud invaded Al-Zulfi. Abdullah bin Muhammad bin Saud also invaded the region, until the people of Al-Zulfi pledged their allegiance to him. Subsequently, a delegation was sent to Diriyah, where they pledged to listen and obey.

In the year 1195 AH, Mishari evaded capture by a family in Egypt and subsequently returned to Al-Qassim, where he amassed the support of the people of Al-Zulfi and Tharmada.

In the year 1196 A.H., Saadun bin Aryar arrived at Mbayed with the people of Al-Zulfi and proceeded to assume control of Al-Rawdah and the slaughter of the Mutawa'ah in Al-Qassim.

In the year 1217 AH, King Saud bin Abdulaziz arrived at Rawdat al-Sabla, where he gathered the wadis en route to Hejaz.

1235 A.H. Mishari bin Saud came to Al-Washm, then to Diriyah with men from Al-Qassim, Al-Zulfi, Tharmada and other slaves of Diriyah, with loads of rice and food.

In the year 1237 of the Islamic calendar, the people of Al-Zulfi invaded Munikh and Sudair with the intention of establishing themselves as rulers of these countries.

In the year 1239 AH, Turki bin Abdullah Al Saud invaded Sudair. The head of Al-Ghat, Ahmad bin Muhammad al-Sudairi, and the people of Al-Zulfi approached him and, upon his intention to depart, he mobilized the people of Al-Zulfi, Al-Ghat, Munikh, and Sudair, subsequently taking them to Harimla.

In the year 1240 A.H., a caravan comprising individuals from Al-Washim, Al-Qassim, Al-Zulfi, and Al-Arid, led by Ali Al-Hamad, was intercepted by Shaaban bin Mughlith bin Hathal of Anza in Jarab.

In the year 1241 AH, Nasser al-Rashid, the Emir of Al-Zulfi, passed away.

In the year 1263 AH, Imam Faisal designated Muhammad bin Ahmad Al-Sudairi as the Emir of Sudair, Munikh, Al-Tuwairif, and Al-Zulfi.

In the year 1277 A.H., Abdullah bin Faisal Al Saud conducted an incursion into the territory of Ajman, situated in proximity to Al-Jahra. During this incursion, he apprehended Hamdi bin Saqyan, a prominent figure among the Bani Abdullah tribe, and proceeded to escort him towards Nafud Al-Zulfi. Subsequently, he conducted a further incursion into the territory of Arab bin Saqyan, situated to the east of Al-Mansaf village in Al-Zulfi.

In 1278 AH, Faisal bin Turki invaded the Ajman, joined by Mutair and Banu Hajar. Ibn Saqyan was subsequently defeated near Al-Mansaf in Al-Zulfi.

In the year 1299 A.H., Abdullah Al-Faisal laid siege to Al-Mujamah. The inhabitants of the city appealed for assistance to Muhammad Al-Abdullah bin Rashid. Upon receiving this appeal, Abdullah left Al-Zulfi and returned to Riyadh.

In the year 1301 AH, Abdullah Al-Faisal launched an assault on Al-Zulfi with an army comprising Shammar and Harb forces. He was joined by the Emir of Al-Qassim, Hassan al-Muhanna Abu al-Khail. Following this, they returned to Al-Zulfi and those with him from the people of Mahmal and Sudair.

In the year 1347 AH (19 Shawwal Al-Sabla), the flag of war was with Al-Sakran. At that time, Muhammad Al-Rashid Al-Badah was with Abdul Rahman Al-Saib. Subsequently, the campaigns of Hamoud Al-Tarz Al-Mutairi and Hamoud Al-Shayqi commenced.

== Topography ==
- Tuwaiq Mountain: Situated at an elevation of approximately 150 meters above sea level, forms the eastern border of the city of Al-Zulfi. It is composed of limestone.
- Nafud al-Thuwairat: The formation of sand dunes is influenced by a range of climatic factors, including the erosion and fragmentation of rocks by wind, the impact of precipitation and extreme climatic conditions on soil composition and fragmentation, and the transportation of these particles by wind to basin areas where they fall below the general level of the Earth's surface. In sheltered areas along rocky ledges, the wind velocity diminishes and continuously deposits its load of sand. It borders Al-Zulfi to the north and west.

=== Valleys and grazing areas ===
The region of Al-Zulfi is characterised by a multitude of valleys and grazing areas. Among these, the most notable are:

- Semnan Valley

The valley is of great significance within the wider context of Al-Zulfi, as it originates from Tuwaiq Mountain and proceeds in a westerly direction. Prior to reaching Al-Rawda centre Al-Hitan, the valley divides into multiple branches that encircle the historic settlements within Al-Zulfi. Semnan is an ancient water source and settlement that has been in existence since the Jahiliyya era. The name Semnan has been used consistently throughout this period, and the city has been referenced in ancient books and dictionaries. In his writings, Yaqut al-Hamawi states: Semnan is a village situated in the Diyar Tamim region, in close proximity to the Yamama oasis. In his Sahih al-Akhbar, Ibn Balihad identifies Semnan as a village situated at the northern extremity of the Yamama Mountain. The region has a longstanding reputation for its palm trees, a fact that has been documented since ancient times. The region of Semnan has been inhabited since ancient times, with a history of agricultural, commercial, and social activity.

- Markh Valley

The longest valley of Al-Zulfi, named Murkh after the Murkh plant, is formed by the descent of a torrent from the Tuwaiq Mountains, which follows Al-Ghat in the east. The torrent then proceeds in a northerly direction until it overflows in Rawdat Al-Sabla. Ibn Balihad posited that The valley is situated on the eastern side of Al-Zulfi, in close proximity to Rawdat al-Sabla and Nafud al-Duwaihi. Merkh Valley is fed by numerous tributaries, including Shuaib al-Sayla, Shuaib Umm al-Ashash, Shuaib al-Haski, Shuaib al-Noum, Shuaib Jarallah, and others.

- Ararera Valley

One of the valleys of Al-Zulfi is situated at the foot of the Tuwaiq Mountains, where the torrential river flows westward, ultimately reaching the towns of Al-Zulfi. The area is characterized by palm trees and numerous water sources, which served as a vital resource during the Jahiliyyah period. Yaqut al-Hamawi makes reference to it in his writings, stating: "Ararera: water for Bani Rabia in Yamamah," as Al-Asmai observed. It is situated between the two mountains and the sand.

- Jazra

The city is situated to the north of Al-Zulfi, a distance of approximately 20 kilometers. The emir of the city was Sheikh Nuqa bin Qarzuh, a member of the Otaiba tribe. Isfahani said: "Subsequently, Araab (Jarab) is allocated for the Banu al-Anbar, followed by Jazra, which is also designated for them."

- Althuwer

It is one of the villages of Al-Zulfi, an old village mentioned by Yaqut, saying "Ubayraq Abyad for Bani Bakr bin Kalab", which is a village inside the Thawirat sand dunes on the north of Al-Zulfi, 40 km away from the city of Al-Zulfi, and is the largest village in the region and inhabited by huge families of civilized Otaiba families. Isfahani stated that Additionally, Bani Hanjoud is home to al-Hamara, al-Thawir, al-Mujda, and numerous water sources.

- Targasha

The site is situated to the south of the city of Al-Zulfi and is an ancient water source. Ibn Jahin stated that "Al-Targhasha is still known today, situated to the south of the country of Al-Zulfi and at a distance of several miles from it in the Ragham sand pit. It features wells and monuments that suggest the presence of an ancient civilization.

- Um Alashash

Situated to the southeast of Al-Zulfi, it was referenced by Yaqut al-Hamawi, Al-Farazdaq, and Isfahani.

- Tuwaiq Mountain

One of the most significant geographical features in Al-Zulfi Governorate is the most renowned mountain in Najd, which originates from Al-Zulfi, specifically from the vicinity of Jazra, and subsequently traverses Al-Zulfi, numerous Najdi cities, and ultimately culminates in the southern expanse of the Kingdom, where it reaches its southernmost point in the Empty Quarter. In his gazetteer, Abdullah bin Khamis makes the following observation: The mountainous region extends from Al-Zulfi in the north to the Empty Quarter in the south, encompassing a distance of over one thousand miles. From west to east, the terrain gradually slopes down until it reaches the eastern plains, approximately 25 to 30 kilometers away. Great valleys flow from the mountains towards the east, including urban centers, villages, palm trees, farms, and towns that are characterized by high fertility, abundance, and productivity.

== Climate ==
The climate of Al-Zulfi is classified as a hot continental climate, with summer temperatures reaching high levels of warmth and mild nights, while winter temperatures are relatively cold. The region experiences low humidity levels throughout the year, particularly during the summer months, and there is a notable contrast between daytime and nighttime temperatures. During the summer months, the minimum temperature ranges between 21 and 37 degrees Celsius, while the maximum temperature oscillates between 41 and 49 degrees Celsius. In regard to the winter season, the prevailing weather conditions are characterized by precipitation and low temperatures, with maximum temperatures ranging between 16 and 28 degrees Celsius and minimum temperatures between -1 and -13 degrees Celsius. In some instances, temperatures may drop below five degrees below zero, resulting in the formation of frost and the occurrence of hail. Additionally, humidity levels range between 40 and 49%, and the precipitation rate varies between 11.5 and 14.9 centimeters (approximately six inches).

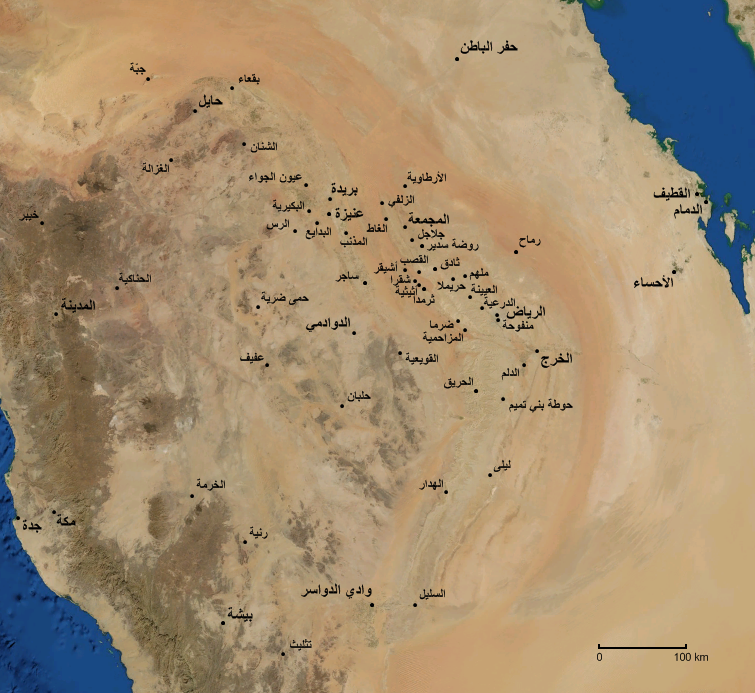
Map showing some of the most important cities, villages located on the Najd Plateau, as well as some neighboring cities and metropolitan areas

== Geographical location ==
Al-Zulfi is situated in the Najd region, in the northernmost part of the Riyadh region, approximately 260 km north of the capital, Riyadh. It covers an area of 5,540 km and has an altitude of approximately 600 meters above sea level. The 2022 census recorded a population of 68,317 people. Al-Zulfi is classified as a category A governorate, and the city is among the most extensive in the Riyadh region, both in terms of area and population density. According to the official report of the Supreme Commission for the Development of the Riyadh Region, the urbanization rate exceeds 98%.

=== Borders ===
The region is bordered to the north by Alqa, to the east by Tuwaiq Mountain, to the west by Nafud Al-Thuwairat, and to the south by Al-Rawdah Center and Al-Ghat Governorate.

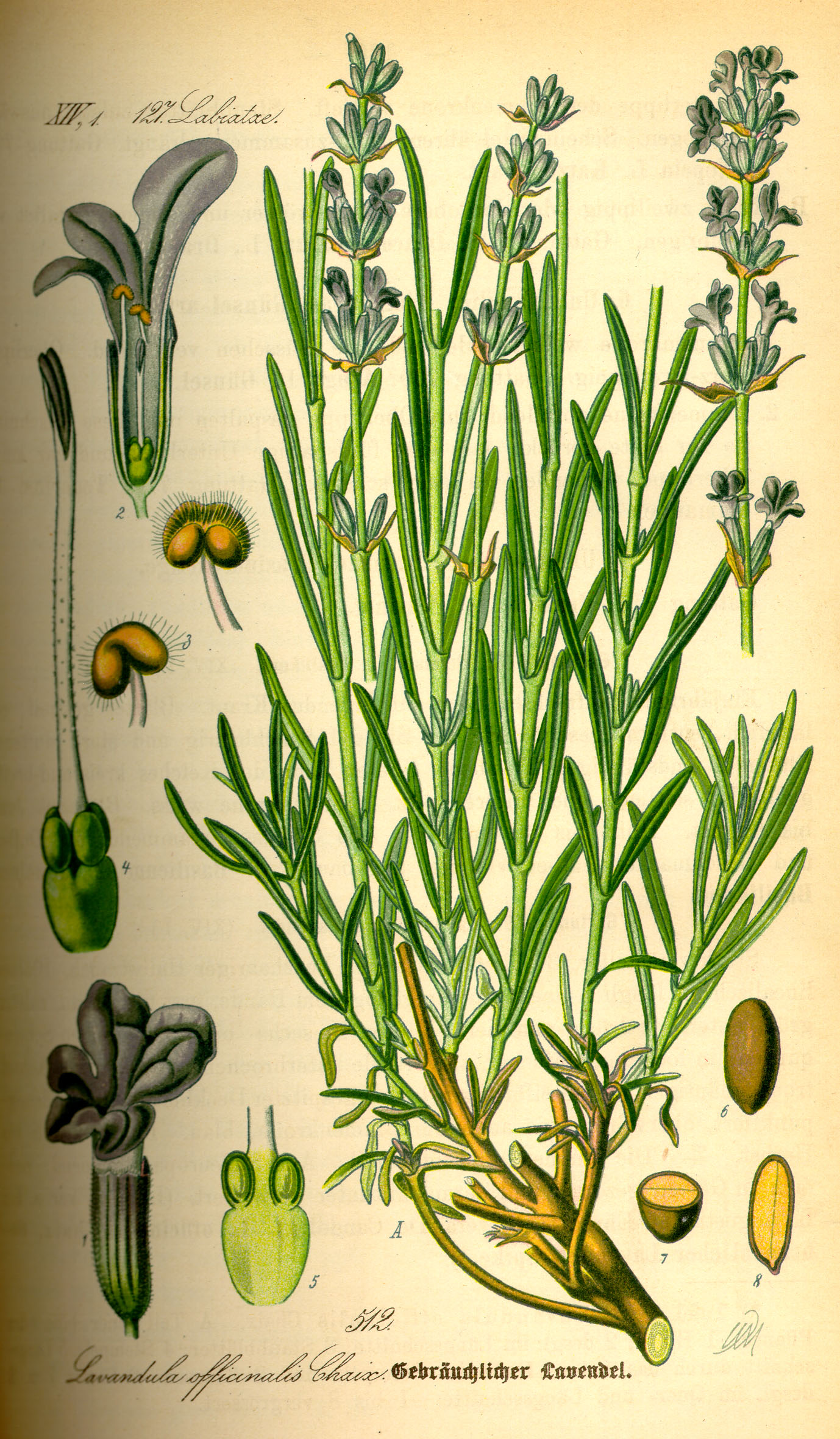
Lavender

== Flora ==
- Shamrocks
- Chamomile
- Wormwood
- Artemisia
- Lavender
- Tallah
- Gada
- Moss
- Silver moss
- Olive moss
- Ghaf
- Rumth
- Alazar
- Thanda
- Sandy moss
- Tarthus of all kinds
- Acacia of all kinds

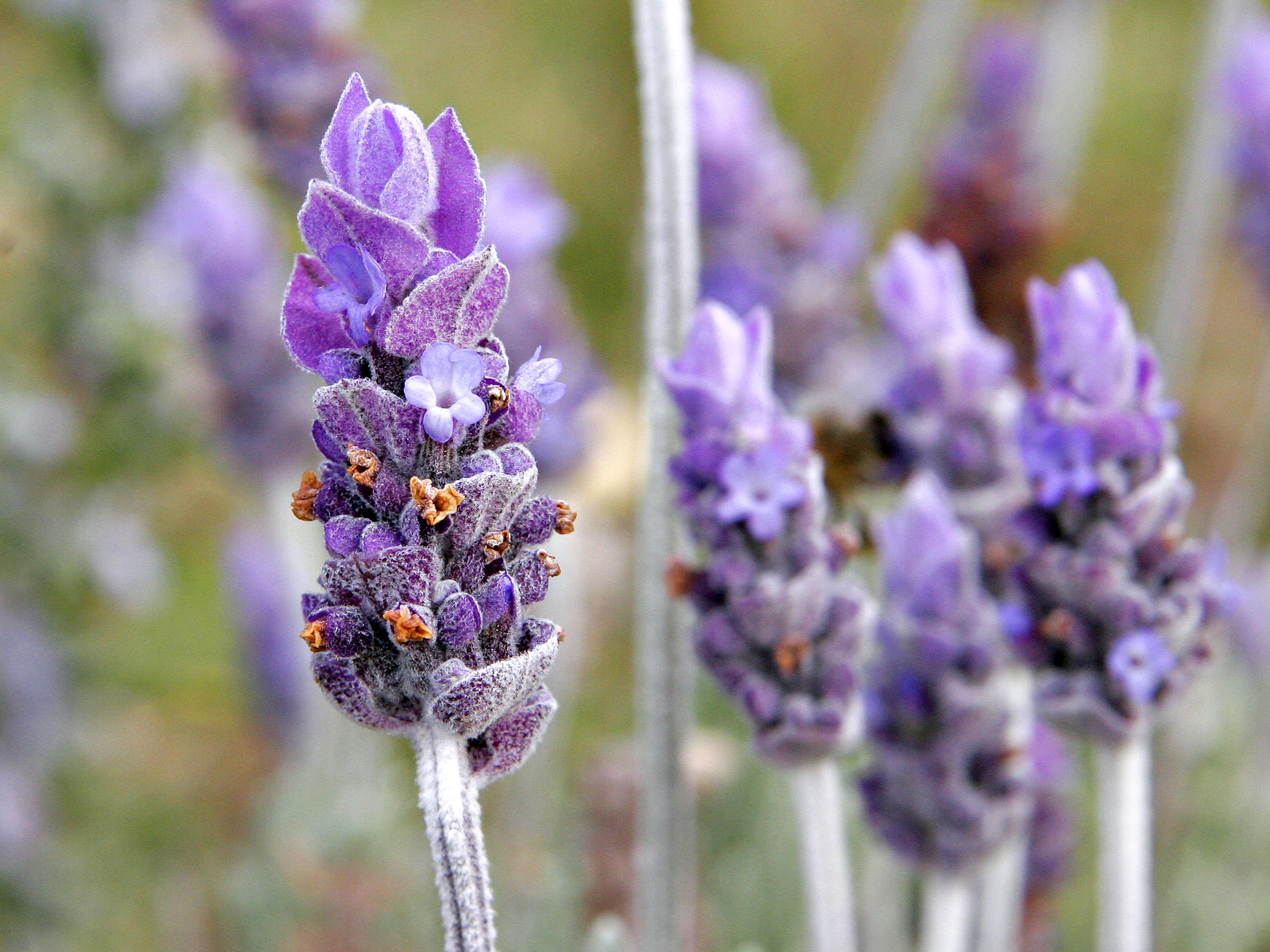
Lavender inflorescences

=== Natural reserves ===
Rawdat Al Sabla Reserve.

== Districts ==
- Al-Quds District
- Yarmouk District
- Yamama District
- Alsiyah District
- Al-Sinaiya District
- Aziziyah District
- Al Farouk District
- Al Faisaliyah District
- Khalidiya District
- Al Salam District
- Aariara District
- Semnan District
- Alaqa District
- Siddiq District
- Al-Faleh District
- Alsalam District
- Al-Rayyan District

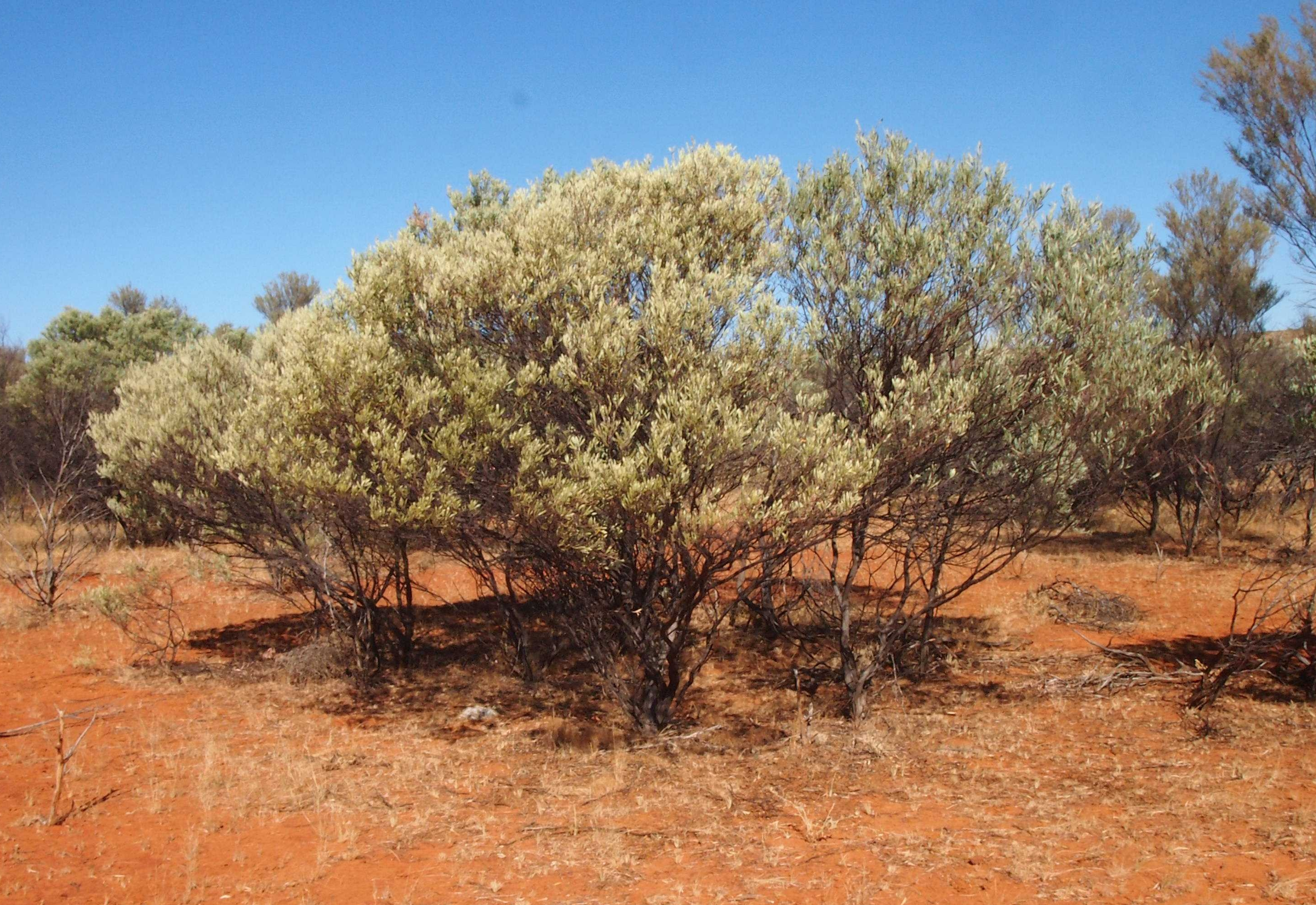
Sandy moss

== Education ==
The inception of formal education in Al-Zulfi Governorate occurred in 1368 AH, with the establishment of the inaugural educational institution, Al-Quds Primary School, by Sheikh Ahmed bin Mubarak Abu Rasin at the behest of King Abdul Aziz. The second educational institution in Al-Zulfi, Ibn Khaldun Primary School, commenced operations in 1372 AH. This was followed by the inauguration of Alaqa and Al-Rawdah Primary School in 1374 AH. Subsequently, an education department was established in 1402 AH, and the establishment of primary schools continued until it reached its current total of over fifty schools in all neighborhoods and villages. The city has seven middle schools for boys and five high schools. Additionally, it has various institutes and colleges for higher education that are affiliated with other educational bodies and institutions, including the Scientific Institute of Imam Mohammad bin Saud Islamic University. The Vocational Training Institute and the Technical College, which are both affiliated with the Technical and Vocational Training Corporation, offer a variety of specializations. Additionally, the institution encompasses the College of Dentistry, the College of Science, and the College of Education. In terms of the history of girls' education, the first school was established in 1384 AH, followed by the inauguration of primary, intermediate, and secondary schools, which comprised 27 primary schools, 13 intermediate schools, and 7 secondary schools. In addition to the College of Education for Girls, the institution offers a tailoring and sewing center, kindergartens, and nurseries. The Department of Girls' Education was established in 1405 AH.

== Healthcare ==
The provision of health services in Al-Zulfi Governorate commenced in 1375 AH, over five and a half decades ago, with the inauguration of the inaugural dispensary. This was followed by the establishment of Al-Zulfi General Hospital in 1387 AH. Currently, healthcare facilities are distributed across the governorate and its constituent villages. Two years ago, the medical complex, designated as the "New Hospital," was inaugurated. Additionally, a branch of the Saudi Red Crescent was inaugurated in 1396 AH.

== Commercial and industrial activity ==
Like many other regions and governorates within the Kingdom of Saudi Arabia, Al-Zulfi serves as a prominent commercial and industrial hub, characterised by a high level of commercial activity and a vast array of retail outlets. According to official statistics, the number of commercial licenses in the region exceeds 7,000. The number of industrial licenses currently exceeds 35, encompassing a diverse range of manufacturing facilities. These include factories engaged in the production of welding wire, aluminum, plastic, and agricultural products, as well as car bodies, concrete, tiles, marble, furniture, foodstuffs, dairy products, juices, water desalination, and ice plants. Al-Zulfi exports its products throughout the Kingdom, the Persian Gulf, and more than 25 other countries worldwide. The commercial movement is overseen by the branch of the Ministry of Commerce, and the governorate also plays host to a chamber of commerce and industry, which contributes to the commercial-industrial movement.

== Agricultural ==
Al-Zulfi is a city with aى agricultural heritage. The land is fertile and water is abundant, which has contributed to the city's reputation for its abundant vegetable production, particularly dates. Palm trees are widely distributed throughout the city, with over 8,000 farms currently producing over 7,360 tons of dates. Additionally, there are over two million fruitful palm trees in Al-Zulfi. The official interest in agriculture in Al-Zulfi can be traced back to 1382 AH, when a branch of agriculture was established and subsequently developed into a directorate in 1405 AH.

== Sports ==
The Ministry of Sports office in Zulfi was inaugurated in the year 1395 AH. The Ministry oversees four clubs. The first club to be officially inaugurated was Tuwaiq Club in 1384 AH, followed by Al-Zulfi Club in 1389 AH. These were the Al-Zulfi FC (formerly Markh), Tuwaiq Club, and Al-Batin FC, and Al-Qaisumah Club. The youth of Al-Zulfi engage in a range of activities, including sports, cultural pursuits, and artistic interests, within the context of these clubs, which serve as pivotal arenas in the lives of young people. The Al-Zulfi community boasts an integrated sports academy, which is affiliated with the Al-Zulfi Club (formerly Marekh).

The Equestrian Club The inaugural board of directors for the club was established in 1415 AH, with racing events having commenced prior to that date, albeit on an irregular basis. In 1418 AH, a ministerial decision was issued to allocate land for the club with an area of 4 million square meters and the necessary funds were provided, and work commenced on the project in the middle of Ramadan until the date of its official inauguration on 10/29/1418 for the Ezz Al-Khail Cup. The field achieved numerous victories at the Kingdom level, including two championships for Ezz Al-Khail.

== Sustainable development ==
The concept of sustainable development in Saudi Arabia encompasses the process of developing the land, cities like Al-Zulfi, communities situated both locally and remotely, and businesses. This process is defined by the ability to meet the needs of the present without compromising the ability of future generations to meet their needs. The global community is confronted with the dual challenge of environmental degradation and the imperative of economic development, social equality, and social justice.

== Roads and transportation ==
- Thuwairat Road
- Hafar Al-Batin Road: Located northeast of the city and connects Al-Zulfi to Hafar and Kuwait.
- Al Ghat Road: It connects the south of Al-Zulfi to the Riyadh-Qassim highway and Al-Ghat governorate.
- Al-Mustawi Road: It is located west of Al-Zulfi and connects Zulfi to the Al-Qassim Road and Wam Sidra.
- Riyadh-Qassim Highway: It is 317 kilometers long from Riyadh to Al-Qassim and connects southeast of ِAl-Zulfi to Riyadh via Sudair, Al-Qassim, and Al-Ghat.

== Old mosques ==
The Abu Atiq Mosque is a prominent religious structure in the city. The mosque is situated in the center of the old market, adjacent to the eastern market. It is one of the oldest mosques in the area. The Al-Aliwiya Mosque The mosque is situated to the west of the market along Al-Amir Street and is one of the oldest mosques in the Al-Bilad neighborhood. However, it was originally located outside the wall. The Salem Mosque The mosque in question is situated to the east of the mosque in the northern market, which is currently designated as King Abdulaziz Mosque. It was originally named Salem Mosque in honor of Salem Al-Omar. The Camel Mosque is a notable landmark in the region. The mosque is situated to the north of the Abu Ateeq Mosque, in close proximity to Al-Bayan shops to the west. It is believed to have originated from a camel, which is said to have prayed in it as an imam. The Al-Tayyib Mosque is situated to the south of the King Abdulaziz Mosque on the same King Abdulaziz Street. The mosque is situated to the south of King Abdulaziz Mosque on the same King Abdulaziz Street. The Camel Mosque is a notable landmark in the region. The mosque is situated to the north of the Abu Ateeq Mosque, in close proximity to Al-Bayan shops to the west. It is believed to have originated from a camel, which is said to have prayed in it as an imam. The Al-Tayyib Mosque is situated to the south of the King Abdulaziz Mosque on the same King Abdulaziz Street. The mosque is situated to the south of King Abdulaziz Mosque on the same King Abdulaziz Street. It is the sole remaining example of an ancient mosque, with the exception of the Jama Masjid. The Al-Wasel Mosque is a notable landmark in the city. The mosque is the property of Abdul Mohsen Al-Wasel, the grandfather of Al-Salamah, and is situated on Al-Rawda Road. The Al-Mujahid Mosque is a notable landmark in the city of Al-Zulfi. The mosque is situated on Al-Rawdah Road, in the western section of the southern neighborhood. It is attributed to the former Emir of Al-Zulfi, Mujahid Al-Abdullah. The Al-Rawda Mosque is located in Al-Rawda Center, the neighborhood west of the southern district of Al-Zulfi city. It is one of the oldest mosques in the area. It is named after Saud bin Nasser and was previously known as the Saud Mosque.

== Parks and tourist attractions ==
- Al-Matl Al-Sharqi Park is located on Mount Tuwaiq at the eastern entrance to Zulfi on the Zulfi - Hafar Al-Batin road line.
- The Western Absolute Park is located at the western entrance on the road that connects Zulfi to the Riyadh-Qassim highway.
- Tahlia Street Roundabout Park
- Kuwait Line Park
- The location of his islands
- Prince Saud bin Abdulaziz bin Mohammed Al Saud Palace
- The site of the Battle of Al Sabla
- Muhambah Rawdat Al Sabla
- Al-Jawi village
- Semnan Center
- Murr village
- Al-Kasr
- Al-Saidaniyah Park
- Al-Zulfi National Park
- Al-Sarout
- Al-Mu'aizliyah
- Aariyarah
- King Saud Palace
- Al-Bateen Al Shamali
- Southern Al Bateen
- Alaqla
- Alaqla Heritage

== Archaeological sites ==
- Aqla town
- Naqrat al-Abd al-Qadir
- Araiara
- Almahaji
- Old Alaqla
- Al-Jardeh
- Souq Falah (Zahra)
- Abu Burgan
- Ashira
- The stone facility in Wadi Markh
- Al-Manshaa in Wasswais
- Dushan Castle
- Qalban al-Baisiya
- Rada'a (wolf and hyena traps) in Suwais
- Ghar al-Hilaliyah in Semnan
- Al-Jarif Castle in Semnan
- Camel Road, Tal'at Umm al-Zar
- Rafiah Mosque in Semnan
- Sheikh Ibn Abdan Palace
- King Saud's Palace
- Maratis Alikhwan

== Faculties ==
- Al Zulfi College for Boys
- Al-Zulfi College for Girls
- Technical College for Boys
- College of Science in Al-Zulfi
- The New University of Al-Zulfi. Which includes most of the city's faculties.

== Main streets ==
- King Abdulaziz Street (Alqa)
- King Fahd St.
- Omar Bin Al Khattab St. (Al-Rawda)
- King Abdullah St. (Tahlia)
- King Salman St. (Al-Arbaeen)
- King Faisal St.
- King Khalid St.

== Factories ==
- Hayat Water Factory
- Tiqnea Factory for Agricultural Equipment
- Welding Wire Factories
- Furniture factories
- Al-Akid Plastics Factories
- Dairy factories
- Juice factories
- Ice factories
- Dates factory

== Charitable associations ==
- Al-Birr Charitable Society in Al-Zulfi
- Charitable Society for Quran Memorization
- Charitable Society for Orphan Care (Insan) Al-Zulfi Branch
- Muslim World League
