= International Islamic Fiqh Academy =

Islamic organization

Organization of Islamic Cooperation International Islamic Fiqh Academy مجمع الفقه الإسلامي الدولي
- Formation: 1981
- Type: OIC subsidiary organ
- Legal status: Non-profit
- Headquarters: Jeddah, Saudi Arabia
- Region served: OIC Member states and Muslim communities
- Members: 57 Member states
- Official languages: Arabic . English . French
- President: Sheikh Salih bin Abdullah al Humaid
- Secretary-General: Dato Prof. Koutoub Moustapha Sano
- Predecessor: Prof. Abdulsalam al-Abbadi
- Key people: Sheikh Bakr Abu Zayd - Sheikh Salih bin Abdullah al Humaid
- Parent organization: Organization of Islamic Cooperation
- Website: http://www.iifa-aifi.org/

International Islamic Fiqh Academy (Arabic: مجمع الفقه الإسلامي الدولي) is an international Islamic institution for the advanced study of Islamic jurisprudence and law based in Jeddah, Saudi Arabia. It was founded following a resolution by the Third Islamic Summit Conference of the Organization of Islamic Cooperation, held in Mecca, that called for the establishment of an Islamic Fiqh Academy. The International Islamic Fiqh Academy was established in June 1983 as a subsidiary organ of the Organization of Islamic Cooperation. It consists of 57 member states and representatives.

Based on both traditional Islamic sciences and modern fields of knowledge, the IIFA seeks to advance knowledge in the realms of culture, science, and economics. The main objective of the IIFA is to address issues related to humanity in accordance with Sharia and Islamic ethics. The IIFA's activities revolve around concluding researches and documentations as well as organizing events and meetings between Islamic scholars and experts in various fields of knowledge. The resolutions and recommendations of the academy deal with various global issues from the perspective of Fiqh.

The IIFA serves as the OIC's jurisprudential agency and legal arm. It also advises and cooperates with other non-Islamic organizations and Fiqh councils. The IIFA convenes annually gathering the most prominent Islamic experts on the globe. The current president is Sheikh Dr. Salih bin Abdullah al Humaid, Imam of the Grand Mosque in Makkah. Its Secretary-General is Prof. Koutoub Moustapha Sano, a former Minister of Religious Affairs in the Republic of Guinea, a recognized Islamic scholar and thinker.

== History ==
=== Background ===
The International Islamic Fiqh Academy was established in June 1983 as a result of an OIC resolution during the Third Islamic Summit in Makkah.

=== Presidents and Secretaries-General ===
The academy has had 2 presidents and 4 Secretaries-General since its foundation. The Secretary-General of the academy is appointed by a decree of the OIC from among the most eminent members of the academy, to serve this position for a renewable term of four years.

The current Secretary-General of the IIFA is Professor Koutoub Moustapha Sano who took office in October 2020 after having held for a dozen years several high level positions in the government of the Republic of Guinea, mainly as Minister of Religious Affairs, Minister of International Cooperation and Minister of Diplomatic Affairs in the Presidency of the Republic of Guinea. In 2007, while he was Deputy Rector (2005-2009) in charge of Internationalization and Innovation at the International Islamic University Malaysia, the former Sultan of Pahang, now King of Malaysia (2019-), conferred on him the honorific title of Dato.

Although the current Secretary-General's appointment predates the COVID-19 pandemic, his predecessor, Professor Abdulsalam al-Abbadi, succumbed on August 10, 2020, at the Saudi-German Hospital in Jeddah, a few weeks before the end of his term as Secretary-General of the academy, reportedly due to complications related to COVID-19. He was buried in Jannat al-Mu'alla cemetery in Makkah.

Presidents:

- 1985–2007 / 1405-1429: Sheikh Dr. Bakr Abu Zayd, a Saudi Arabian Islamic scholar and former member of the Council of Senior Scholars and the Permanent Committee for Islamic Research and Issuing Fatwas.
- 2007/1429––present: Sheikh Dr. Salih bin Abdullah al Humaid, a Saudi Arabian Islamic scholar, current Imam Khatib at the Grand Mosque of Makkah, and Advisor to the Saudi Royal Court.

Secretaries-General:

- 1984–2008 / 1405-1429: Sheikh Dr. Mohamed Habib Belkhodja, former Grand Mufti of the Republic of Tunisia.
- 2011–2015 / 1432-1436: Prof. Ahmed Khaled Babkar, former Secretary-General of the Republic of Sudan's Islamic Fiqh Council.
- 2015–2020 / 1436-1442: Prof. Abdulsalam al-Abbadi, former Minister of Awqaf, Islamic Affairs, and Holy Sites of the Hashemite Kingdom of Jordan.
- 2020 / 1442––present: Prof. Koutoub Moustapha Sano, former Minister of Religious Affairs, and Adviser to the President of the Republic of Guinea.

=== Membership ===
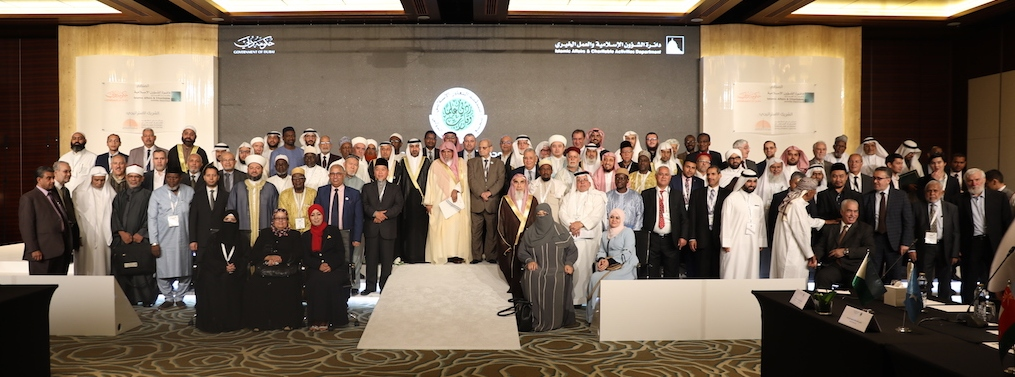
Key Participants at 24th Annual Conference of the International Islamic Fiqh Academy, Dubai, November 2019. Image reflecting Muslim world's diversity and harmony.

Since the IIFA is a subsidiary organ of the Organization of Islamic Cooperation, it shares the same 57 Member states. Most of these countries are Muslim-majority countries, and the vast majority of them have an official representative elected by their governments to represent them in the academy. Many of these representatives are former or current Ministers of Religious Affairs, Grand Muftis, or prominent Islamic scholars.

Member states' representatives regularly participate in the academy's annual conference and events, in addition to the hundreds of researchers, experts and scholars, from Member and non-Member states, who contribute to its annual conference and various seminars.

=== Mission and Purpose ===
In its statute and brochure, the academy defines its mission as follows:

The Academy seeks to present Sharia in a moderate manner, emphasizing its merits and its full capacity to deal with the problems and issues of life as well as its capacity to help mankind to achieve happiness, stability, peace, security, and safety in this life and beyond. This mission is based on a comprehensive and integrated understanding of the Islamic religion, its foundations, its sources, its objectives, its principles, and its provisions.

As for its purpose, the academy states:

The Fiqh Academy aims at becoming the world's leading jurisprudential reference to which turn the countries of Islamic world and the Muslim communities in order to clarify the positions of Shariah on issues of concern to Muslims and to provide appropriate solutions to the problems of contemporary life, derived from the Holy Qur'an, the noble prophetic Sunnah and the rich Islamic heritage.

== International Cooperation ==
The IIFA is arguably the world's largest and most influential Fiqh council. It signed cooperation agreements with several international organizations, including a partnership with the World Health Organization for the eradication of the poliovirus through the Islamic Advisory Group that was established by the World Health Organization and Muslim public entities.

Other partnerships include the memorandum of understanding between the IIFA and United Nations High Commissioner for Refugees, for which the IIFA issued a Fatwa in 2020 allowing it to collect Zakat and charity funds from Muslim donors and distribute them to refugees and displaced persons around the world.

== COVID-19 Pandemic ==
The IIFA has played a critical role during the COVID-19 pandemic by raising-awareness on the safety and preventive measures against the coronavirus, addressing the OIC Member states and international organizations worldwide with an in-depth fatwa on the COVID-19 pandemic, and urging Muslim populations and local leaders to comply with the precautionary measures set by governments and health authorities to fight the pandemic and minimize its effects.

The IIFA took a firm stand against the coronavirus pandemic and was one of the first Islamic institutions to condemn the COVID-19 conspiracy theories and call for public preventive measures. It refuted the irregular fatwas issued by individual muftis and unreliable organizations that doubted the COVID-19 treatment or called for public disobedience to preventive measures. Instead, it urged the masses to rely on Islamic legal opinions from renowned scholars and physicians to deal with the COVID-19 pandemic.

== Medical Research Ethics ==
The International Islamic Fiqh Academy had a large hand in the allowance of organ transplantations. In 1986, the International Islamic Fiqh Academy recognized brain-death as a recognized form of death in Islam. This allowed for the immediate start of organ transplantation in Saudi Arabia. The IIFA later issued a fatwa on organ transplantation that expanded the practice .

In 1992, 1997, 2004, 2006, and 2018, the IIFA issued resolutions (fatwas) about medical research ethics. Other organizations that have issued similar fatwas - some in cooperation with the IIFA - include Islamic Organization for Medical Sciences, Islamic Fiqh Council, Dar-Alifta Al-Misrriyah, and Islamic Medical Association of North America.

The IIFA has had a hand in defining standards of medical research confidentiality via institutional fatwas. It has also issued a resolution about fasting during Ramadan for people with diabetes.

== Struggle against Extremism and Terrorism ==
Since its establishment in 1984, the International Islamic Fiqh Academy vowed to fight extremism, terrorism, and to promote values of moderation and tolerance based on a thorough understanding of Islamic resources. Several members and collaborators of the academy are signatories of the Amman Message (2004) and the Makkah Declaration (2019).

The International Islamic Fiqh Academy issued several statements and resolutions condemning violence and different forms of extremism on the grounds of Fiqh and Sharia. This had a significant impact on curbing the tide of extremism in the Muslim world. In October–November 2018, the Madinah Declaration was issued at the 23rd session of the academy in Al Madinah Al Munawwarah, and it called for denominational and jurisprudential tolerance, cooperation, and integration between different Islamic schools and denominations.

In June 2006 (Ramadan 1427 AH), under the auspices of the International Islamic Fiqh Academy, several dozen Iraqi religious leaders from Sunni and Shia factions took part in a two-day meeting near Masjid al-Haram in Makkah and signed the Makkah Document that called to take practical steps to end the sectarian violence in post-Saddam Iraq. The Makkah Document supposedly called for the formation of committees in various parts of Iraq and for organizing seminars of Sunni and Shia religious leaders and scholars.

== Academic Achievements ==
As of 2019, the IIFA held 24 international sessions and issued 238 resolutions on various issues of concern to both Muslims and non-Muslims. The IIFA sessions and seminars' basic research reached a total number of 80 volumes while the IIFA resolutions and recommendations have been translated and published in English and French.

== IIFA Waqf Fund ==
The IIFA is a non-profit academic institution that relies on contributions from member states and private donors for funding. In 2020, a special endowment fund named the IIFA Waqf Fund has been established by the IIFA to attract public and private donors from around the world.

== Member States and Representatives ==
The following list contains the names of the Member states, the date of accession and the current representatives. Representatives are appointed by Member states from among the most eminent scholars in their countries, many of whom are current or former ministers, grand muftis, and university professors. The IIFA has the same 57 Member states as its parent, the Organization of Islamic Cooperation, including other subsidiary institutions such as the Islamic Development Bank and the Islamic World Educational, Scientific and Cultural Organization.

- Hashemite Kingdom of Jordan (1983) : Dr. Muhammad Ahmed Muslim al-Khalayla
- Islamic Republic of Afghanistan ( 1983) : Dr. Abdulrazik Wardak Muradkhan
- Republic of Albania (1992) : vacant
- Republic of Uzbekistan (1995) : Aziz Khan Mansorov
- Republic of Uganda (1983) : in process.
- United Arab Emirates (1983) : Ahmed Abdulaziz al Haddad
- Islamic Republic of Pakistan (1983) : Justice Muhammad Taqi Usmani
- Kingdom of Bahrain (1983) : Dr. Farid Yacoub al-Miftah
- Brunei Darussalam (1984) : Dato Dr. Haji Jaafar bin Haji Mat Dan
- People's Republic of Bangladesh (1983) : Dr. Abdullah Maruf Muhammad Shah Allam
- Republic of Benin (1983) : Sheikh Hassan Omar Farouq
- Republic of Indonesia (1983) : vacant
- Islamic Republic of Iran (1983) : Dr. Ahmad Mobaleghi
- Republic of Azerbaijan (1992) : vacant
- Burkina Faso (1983) : Dr. Aboubakar Doukouri
- Turkmenistan (1992) : vacant
- Republic of Turkey (1983) : Prof. Murtada Badr
- Republic of Chad (1983) : Sheikh Tijani Saboun Mohamed
- Togolese Republic (1997) : Sheikh Mamadou Abdou Batchi
- Republic of Tunisia (1983) : Othman Battikh
- People's Democratic Republic of Algeria (1983) : Prof. Kamel Bouzidi
- Republic of Djibouti (1983) : Sheikh Abdulrahmaan Muhammad Ali
- Kingdom of Saudi Arabia (1983) : Sheikh Saleh bin Abdullah bin Humaid
- Republic of Senegal (1983) : Dr. Rouhan Ambay
- Republic of Sudan (1983) : Dr. Abdulraheem Adam Sulayman
- Arab Republic of Syria (1983) : on hold.
- Republic of Suriname (1996) : vacant
- Republic of Sierra Leone (1983) : vacant
- Federal Republic of Somalia (1983) : Dr. Othman bin Muallim Mahmood bin Sheikh Ali
- Republic of Tajikistan (1992) : Sheikh Saidmukarram Abdulkodirzoda
- Republic of Iraq (1983) : in process.
- Sultanate of Oman (1983) : Sheikh Ahmed bin Hamad al-Khalili
- Gabonese Republic (1983) : vacant
- Republic of the Gambia (1983) : vacant
- Co-operative Republic of Guyana (1998) : vacant
- Republic of Guinea (1983) : Prof. Koutoub Moustapha Sano
- Republic of Guinea-Bissau (1983) : vacant
- State of Palestine (1983) : Sheikh Muhammad Ahmad Hussein
- State of Qatar (1983) : Sheikh Thaqil bin Sayir Zayd al-Shamri
- Union of the Comoros (1983) : vacant
- Kyrgyz Republic (1992) : vacant
- Republic of Kazakhstan (1995) : Sheikh Irshad Aghabi Ogli Ongarov
- Republic of Cameroon (1983) : Sheikh Muhammad Mal Bakri
- Republic of Côte d'Ivoire (2001) : Dr. Konati Arna
- State of Kuwait (1983) : Dr. Ajil Jassim al-Namshi
- Lebanese Republic (1983) : Sheikh Khalil Al-Mays
- State of Libya (1983) : Dr. Hamzah Abufaris
- Republic of Maldives (1983) : Sheikh Muhammad Rachid Ibrahim
- Republic of Mali (1983) : Sheikh Hamzah Moustapha Maga
- Malaysia (1983) : Wan Zahidi bin Wan Teh
- Arab Republic of Egypt (1983) : Dr. Ali Gomaa
- Kingdom of Morocco (1983) : Dr. Hamdati Shabihna Ma'ainin
- Islamic Republic of Mauritania (1983) : Sheikh Mohamed Mokhtar Ouldmbala
- Republic of Mozambique (1994) : vacant
- Republic of the Niger (1983) : Dr. Abdullah Idris Abubakr Maga
- Federal Republic of Nigeria (1986) : Sheikh Ahmed Said Qalqashandi
- Republic of Yemen (1983) : Sheikh Muhammad Abdah Omar

== Gallery ==
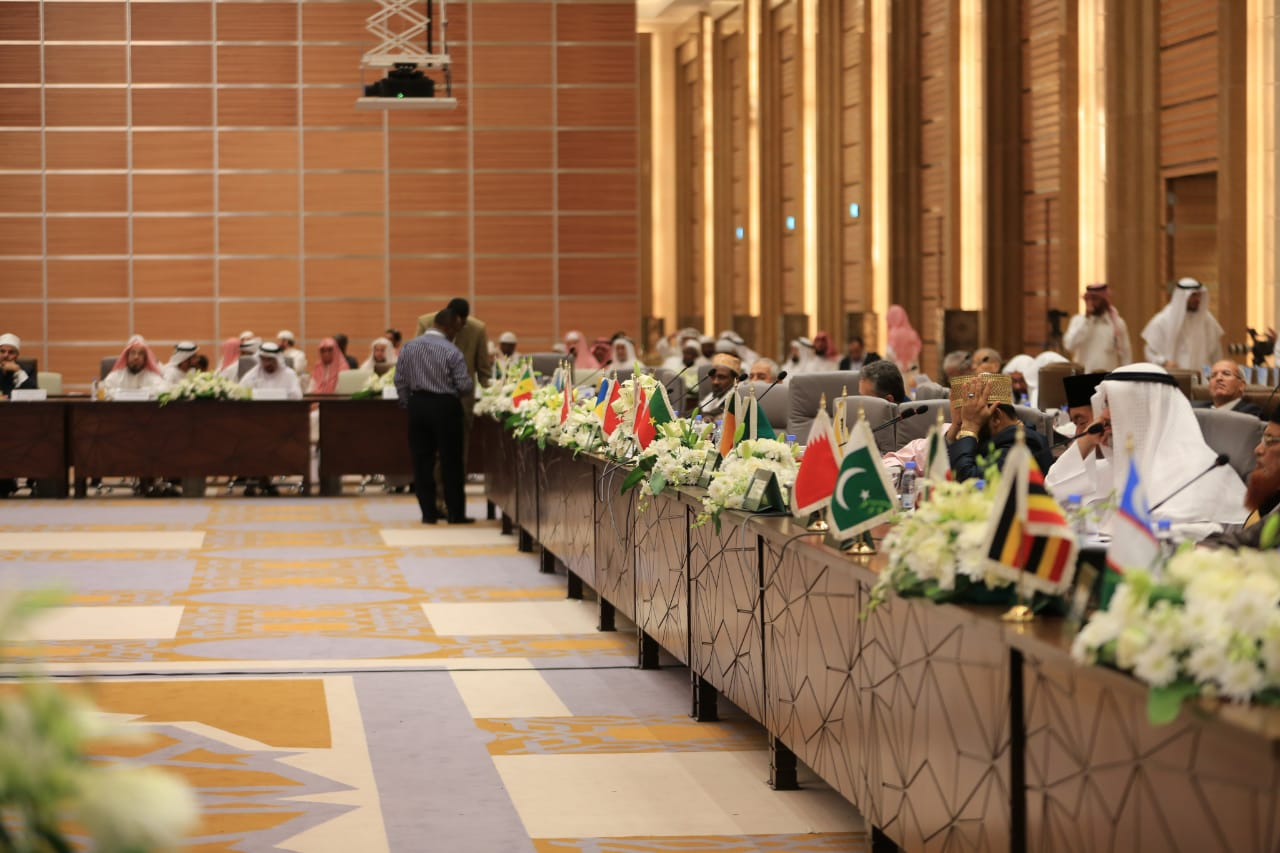
Meeting room at the IIFA 23rd Session, held in Medina, November 2018

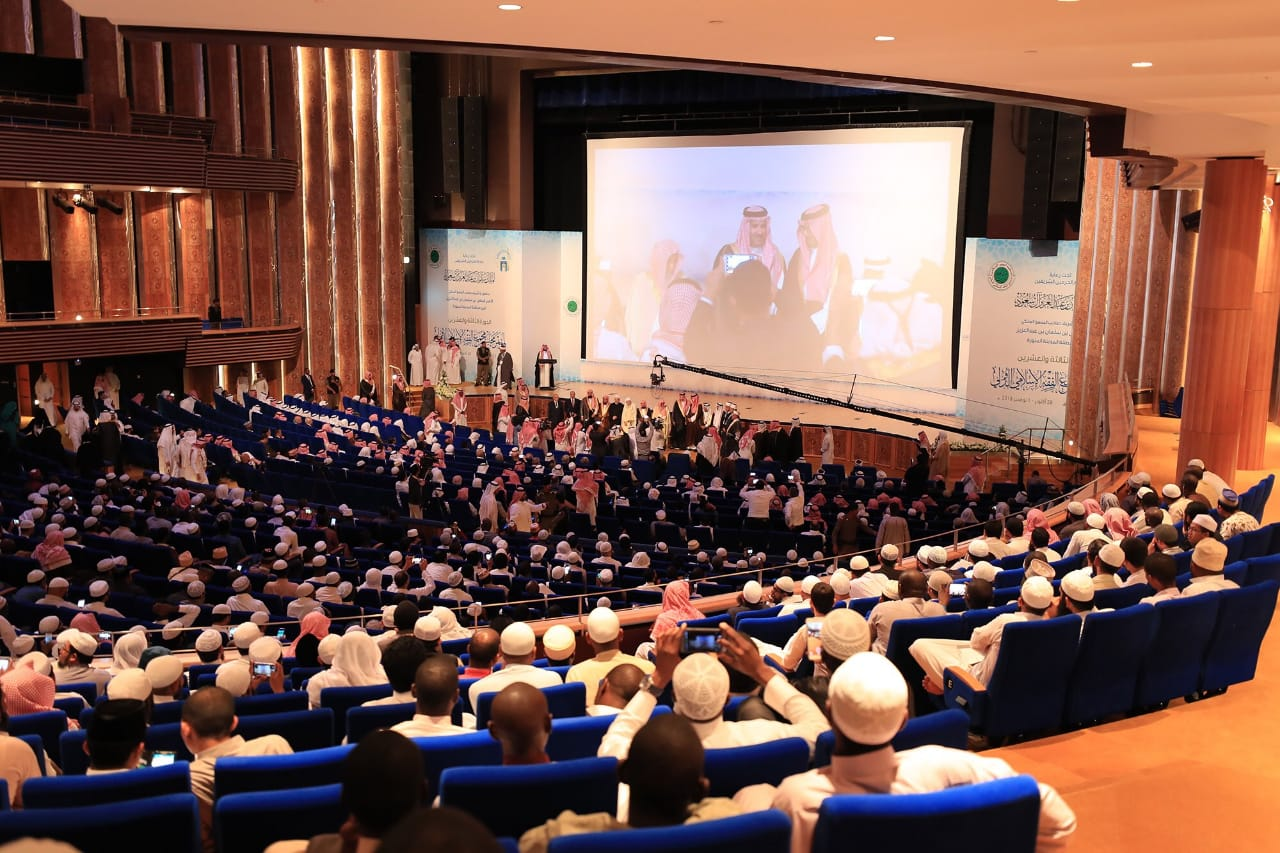
King Salman International Convention Center in Medina hosting one of the sessions of the academy

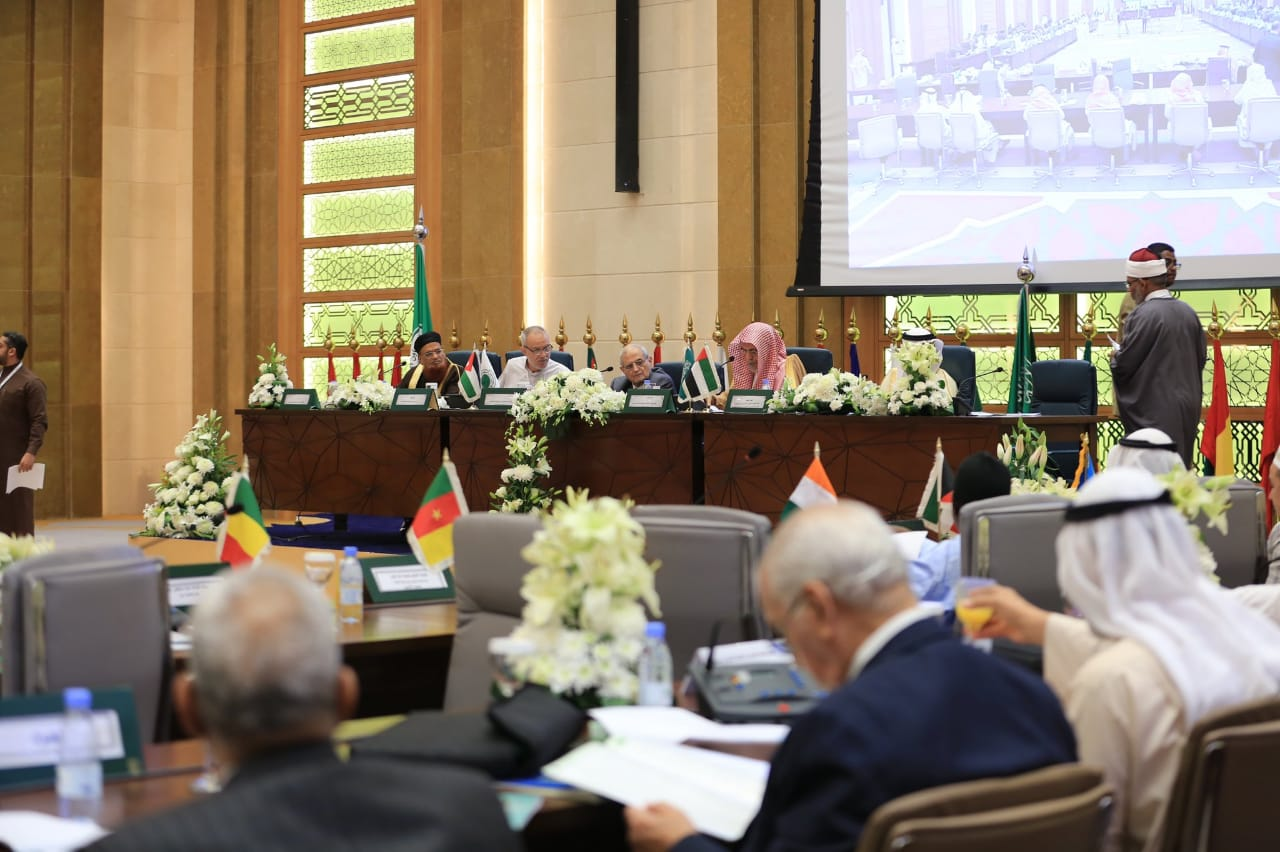
Panel discussion during one of the plenary sessions

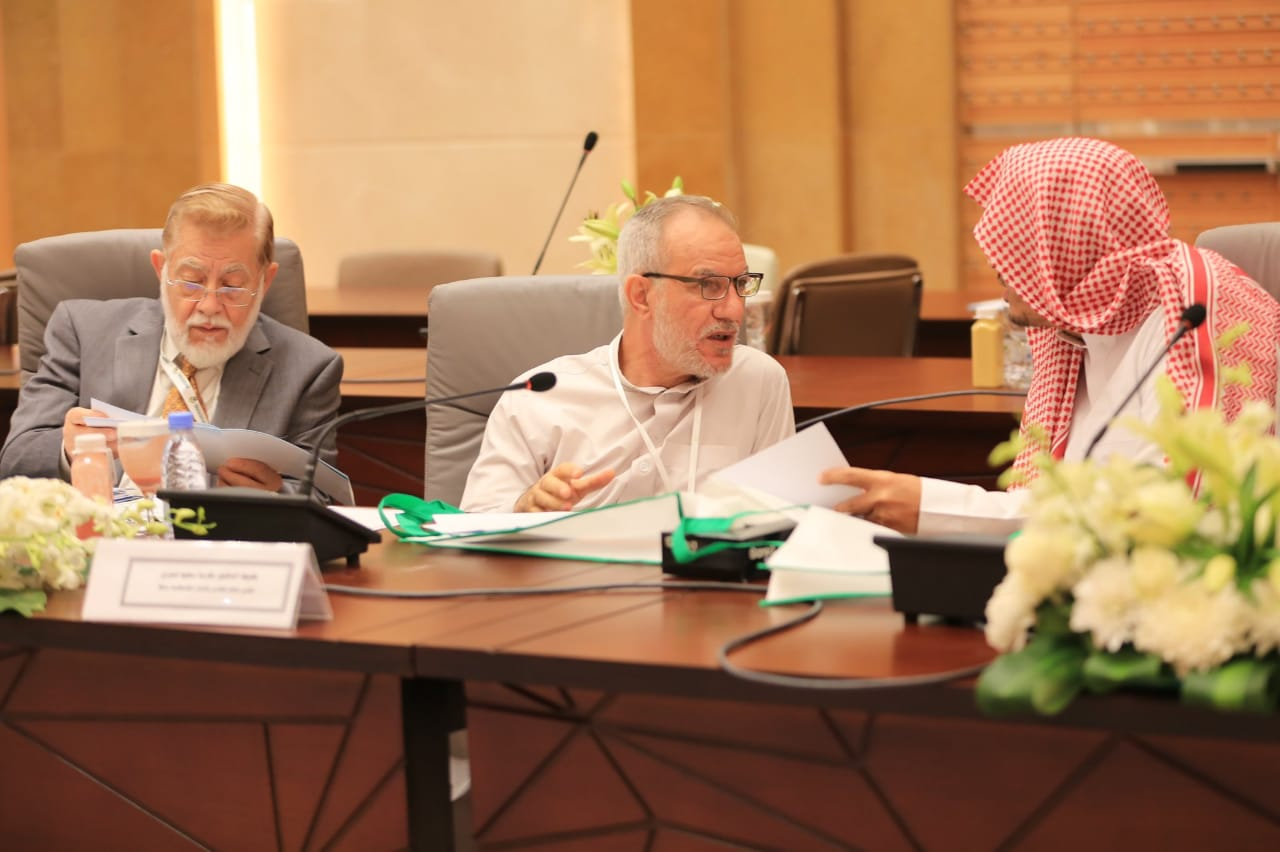
Discussion and consultation between scholars and experts from different parts of the Muslim world

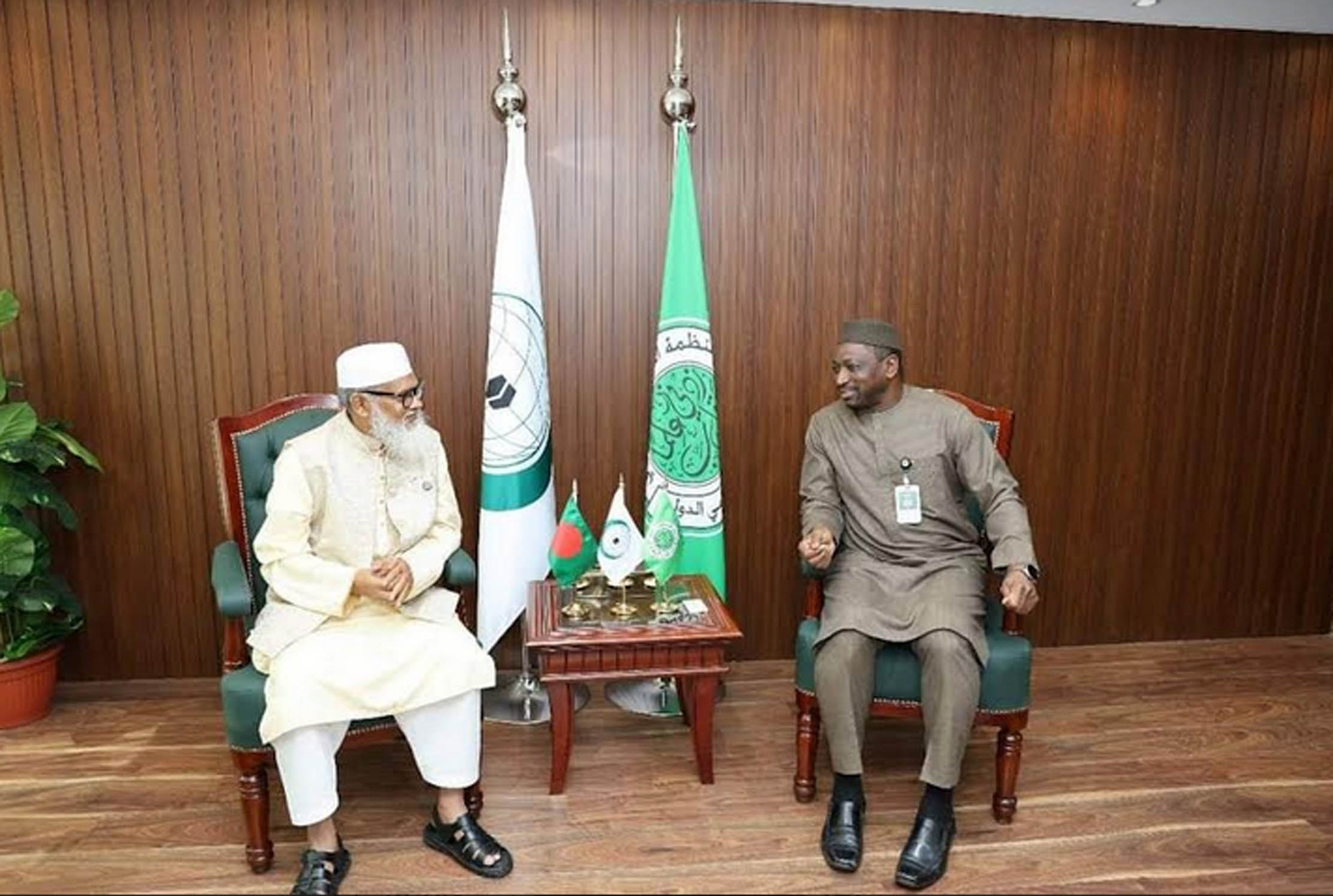
bilateral meeting between Dr. AFM Khalid Hossain held a with the Secretary General of the International Islamic Fiqh Academy, Dr. Qutub Mustafa Sano, at the IIFA

== See also ==
- Fiqh
- Sharia
- Bakr Abu Zayd
- Islam
- List of Islamic educational institutions
