= Al-Jami al-Kamil =

Secondary hadith collection book

Al-Jāmi' al-Kāmil Fī al-Hadīth al-Sahīh al-Shāmil
- Author: Imam Ziya-ur-Rahman Azmi
- Original title: الجامع الكامل في الحديث الصحيح الشامل
- Language: Arabic
- Genre: Hadith collection
- Published: 2019 (Dar Ibn Bashir) (Arabic) 2nd/final edition
- Publication place: KSA and PAK

Website: https://jami-al-kamil.com/

Al-Jāmi' al-Kāmil Fī al-Hadīth al-Sahīh al-Shāmil or in short Jami ul Kamil or al-Jāmi' al-Kāmil (Arabic: الجامع الكامل في الحديث الصحيح الشامل), known in English as The Comprehensive Collection of all Authentic Prophetic Narrations or The Authentic Hadith Encyclopaedia, is a secondary hadith collection book, compiled by the Islamic scholar Imam Ziya-ur-Rahman Azmi (1943 CE – 30 July 2020 CE). In this book, the author claims that he has compiled all authentic Prophetic narrations (sahīh ahādīth) from more than two hundred books. This work constitutes the first time in Islamic history that a single unified work claims to have captured all authentic hadiths called Sahih hadith.

== Description ==
Drawing from 40 years of scholarship and 20 years specifically compiling the work, Azami is the first person in history to compile a comprehensive statement of all sahīh and hasan hadīths in one work. Azami states that he is confident that if not 100%, he has captured 95% of all authentic narrations of the Prophet's sunnah. According to Islamic scholar Muhammad Ishaq Bhatti, "this is such a work that no one has done before."

== Number of Hadith ==
The first edition contains 15978 sahīh or hasan hadīths whereas the second and final edition contains 16546 hadiths.

Ziaur Rahman Azmi spent 15 years of work and in this work he took the help of more than 200 hadith books. Azami estimates that the totality of hadīths (i.e. mutun/texts) in all books are 60,000 (with repetition removed). 8,000 exist in the kutub al-sittah (with repetition removed); 19,000 in the zawā'id (of the Musnad of Ahmed, Bazzar, Abu Ya'la, and Tabrāni's three). The zawā'id (unique hadīths not found elsewhere) do not constitute more than 10,000.

He states that the number of authentic texts (mutun sahīha) are approximately between 12,000 and 15,000. The vast majority of these are from the kutub al-sittah, Ahmed's Musnad and Malik's Muwatta - he estimates no more than 2,000 exist elsewhere.

Azami says he is confident that, if not 100%, he has obtained 95% of all authentic hadiths about the Sunnah of the Prophet.

== Editions ==
The first edition was published in 2016 by Dar us Salam, Riyad in 12 volumes. Al-Maktabah al-Shamela digitised this edition and it is available online.

Azami then reviewed his work and made minor modifications resulting in the second and final edition that was published by Maktaba bayt al-Salam, Dar Ibn Bashir (دار ابن بشیر) in Pakistan in 19 volumes. This is the used (mu'tamad) edition representing the author's settled views.

For the benefit of laypeople, Ziya-ur-Rahman Azmi compiled an abridged version (talkhīs) that omits commentary on each hadith's authenticity (takhrīj), only containing the hadīths themselves, and omitting the additional c.1000 weak hadiths that others considered authentic but he declared weak.

=== Translations ===
The English translation of the abridged edition is complete and is awaiting publication under supervision of Dr. Zakir Naik and Abdul Rehman Mahdi (as of March 2026).

Abubakar Muhammad Zakaria edited the first volume of the Bengali translation of the book translated by Abdullah Al-Mamun Al-Azhari.

Its Urdu translation (Version One with 15978 Hadiths) is completed in 2025 and has been published in soft form only, under the supervision of Sheikh Ibn Bashir (of Dar Ibn Bashir) and Abdul Rehman Mahdi. Its second and final version translation into Urdu, Farsi, English and Pashto is in progress.

== Publication ==
- Arabic first edition (12 volumes), published by Dar-us-salam Publications KSA: https://dusp.org/arabic/hadith/a25-arabic-al-jamiul-kamil-fee-al-hadith-as-sahih-al-shamil-12-vol-set.html
- Final Arabic second edition (19 volumes) published by Maktaba Bayt al-Salam, Dar Ibn Bashir, Pakistan
  - The abridged talkhis is published in 6 volumes in Arabic. Volumes 1-6 are available online as a scanned pdf.
- Urdu translation of Version One has been published by Abdul Rehman Mahdi and its final version translation is in progress under supervision of Abdul Rehman Mahdi and Dar-Ibn-e-Bashir (based on the Arabic second/final edition) which has been published (in Arabic) by Dar Ibn Bashir, Pakistan.
- Bengali translation, first edition (first volume), 2021 Shobuj Uddyog Publication

== See also ==
- Sihah Sittah
- Sahih Bukhari
- https://jami-al-kamil.com/:
