= Abu Turab al-Zahiri =

Indian-born Saudi Arabian scholar

Abū Turāb al-Ẓāhirī
- أبو تراب الظاهري

Personal life
- Born: 1 January 1923 Ahmedpur East, Punjab Province, British India (present-day Punjab, Pakistan)
- Died: 4 May 2002 (aged 79) Mecca, Saudi Arabia
- Resting place: Jannatul Mualla
- Parent: Abdul Haqq Al-Hashemi (father)
- Citizenship: British Indian (1923–1947); Saudi Arabian (1948–2002)
- Main interest(s): Jurisprudence, poetry, Biographical evaluation
- Occupation: Author, journalist
- Relatives: Sheikhs of Kotla Shaikhan Bahawalpur

Religious life
- Religion: Islam
- Denomination: Sunni
- Jurisprudence: Zahiri
- Creed: Athari
- Movement: Salafism

Muslim leader
- Influenced by: Ahmad Muhammad Shakir
- Influenced: Abu Abd al-Rahman Ibn Aqil al-Zahiri

Abū Muḥammad ʿAbd al-Jamīl bin ʿAbd al-Ḥaqq bin ʿAbd al-Waḥīd bin Muḥammad bin al-Hāshim bin Bilāl al-Hāshimī al-ʿUmarī al-ʿAdawī, better known as Abū Turāb al-Ẓāhirī (Arabic: أبو محمد عبد الجميل بن عبد الحق بن عبد الوحيد بن محمد بن الهاشم بن بلال الهاشمي العمري العدوي; 1 January 1923 – 4 May 2002), was an Indian-born Saudi Arabian linguist, jurist, theologian and journalist. he was often referred to as the Sibawayh of his era due to his knowledge of the Arabic language. Al-Ẓāhirī’s contributions to Islamic jurisprudence, poetry, and biographical evaluation have left a lasting impact on the field. Born in Ahmedpur East, Punjab Province, British India (present-day Punjab, Pakistan), he later became a prominent figure in Saudi Arabia, where he taught Muslim theology at Mecca’s Masjid al-Haram. His extensive travels in pursuit of Islamic manuscripts and his scholarly works have cemented his legacy as a distinguished scholar and author.

== Birth and Family Background ==
Abu Turab was born on 1 January 1923 in what was the erstwhile British Raj in Ahmedpur, Punjab Province. His father was Abdul Haqq Al-Hashemi, a prominent Muhaddith and Islamic scholar in the Indian Subcontinent who had settled in Mecca in Saudi Arabia upon invitation of King Abdul Aziz bin Abdurrahman Al-Saud. Through their family tree, Abu Turab's parents could trace their roots back to Umar, the second caliph of Islam and of the Rashidun Caliphate, and thus the Banu Adi clan of the Quraysh tribe. The family's arrival in the Indian Subcontinent coincided with Muhammad ibn al-Qasim's conquest of Sindh.

He is a 43rd descendant of Umar ibn al-Khattab his lineage back to him is; Abdul Jamil bin Abdul Haqq bin Abdul Wahid bin Muhammad bin Hashem bin Ramadan bin Bilal bin Hibatullah bin Ali bin Ismail bin Jalal bin al-Shams bin al-Amir bin Ja’far bin Abdur Rahman bin Jalal bin Muhammad Kabir bin al-Amir bin Wasil bin Abul Abbas bin Hashem bin Muhammad al-Kabir bin Abdur Rahman bin Jalal bin Mahmud bin Umar bin Jalal bin al-Amir bin Muhammad bin al-Amir bin Najib bin Umar bin Nasir bin Muhammad bin Abid bin Abi Bakr bin Najib bin Zayd bin Abid bin Abi Muslim bin Abdullah bin Abbas bin Muhammad bin Zayd bin Abdullah bin Umar bin al-Khattab.

== Scholarly Pursuits ==
Abu Turab traveled extensively in pursuit of Islamic manuscripts, which he often copied by hand due to a lack of resources. During his younger years, he visited Western Europe, North Africa, and the Middle East. He eventually ended up in Egypt, where he earned his master's and doctoral degrees at Al-Azhar University, and was also a student of fellow Hadith specialist Ahmad Muhammad Shakir. Later, Zahiri settled down in Saudi Arabia in 1948 at the behest of first King of Saudi Arabia Ibn Saud, who requested that Abu Turab teach Muslim theology in Mecca's Masjid al-Haram, the holiest site in Islam along with his father Abdul Haqq Al-Hashemi. Zahiri's best-known student was Abu Abd al-Rahman Ibn Aqil al-Zahiri, who shared Abu Turab's pen name due to their adherence to the Zahirite school of Islamic law. Zahiri also had a friendship with a fellow foreigners in Saudi Arabia, Abdallah Bin Bayyah.

== Death ==
Abu Turab died on Saturday morning, the 21st of Safar in 1423 Hijri, corresponding to 4 May 2002 Gregorian. While in his private library, Abu Turab complained of paralysis in his feet to an aide. Prevented from pronouncing the Muslim testimony of faith due to aphasia, Abu Turab died on his bed pointing toward the sky instead. The next morning, he was buried in Mecca's historic Jannatul Mualla cemetery.

== Works ==
Abu Turab authored roughly fifty published works. Although he was fluent in Persian and Urdu and conversational in multiple Languages of India, most of his written work was in Arabic.

=== Biographical ===
- ʻAbd al-Karīm ibn ʻAbd Allāh ʻAbd al-Karīm, Abū Turāb al-Ẓāhirī, 1343–1423 H/1923-2002 M : ṣafaḥāt min ḥayātih-- wa-taʼammulāt fī adabih. Riyadh: Maktabat al-Malik Fahd al-Waṭanīyah, 2008. 603 pgs.; 24 cm. ISBN 9789960003023
- ʻAlawī Ṭāhā Ṣāfī, Abū Turāb al-Ẓāhirī-- al-ʻālim al-mawsūʻah-- aw Sībawayh al-aṣr. Riyadh: al-Majallah al-ʻArabīyah, 2003. 32 pgs.; 20 cm. OCLC No. 424454353

=== Original ===
- Detik-detik kepergian Rasulullah. Jakarta: Pustaka Azzam, 2001. 328 p.; 23 cm. Translated by Wawan Djunaedi Soffandi.
- Lijam al-aqlam. Maktabat al-Tihama, 1982. 276 pgs.
