= Towhidi Janata =

Term or banner used by the disorganized Islamist groups in Bangladesh

Towhidi Janata (Bengali: তৌহিদী জনতা, romanized: Tôuhidī Jônôtā, lit. 'Monotheistic Mass') is a Bangladeshi Far-right movement centred around mass mobilization in protests, demonstrations, and political violence, centred around religious issues at various times. There have been instances where they have attempted to prevent the participation of entertainment industry figures and personalities, particularly female artists, in various social and cultural events.

== Origin and meaning ==
The term Tawhidi Janata is formed by combining two separate words from Arabic and Bengali. The word Tawhid refers to the oneness of Allah. From Tawhid, the term Tawhidi is derived, meaning someone who believes in the oneness of Allah. The word Janata comes from Bengali, meaning the general public or a group of people. Together, these words form Tawhidi Janata, which translates to "people who follow Tawhid" or "supporters of monotheism".

== Affiliations ==
In the context of Bangladesh, Tawhidi Janata or Touhidi Janata is used to express the general Muslim community of Bangladesh like in the context of 1975, 1997, 1998, 2001 etc.

On April 8, 2013, Al Jazeera used the term Tawhidi Janata to refer to revolutionary people. On November 11, 2016, New Age reported that Tawhidi Janata was part of a national group supported by Hefazat-e-Islam Bangladesh. On February 21, 2025, during a pre-protest gathering under the banner of Tawhidi Chhatra-Janata at the Baitul Mukarram premises, Islamic speaker Enayetullah Abbasi called for the implementation of the 13-point demand originally raised by Hefazat-e-Islam in 2013. In the same assembly, another scholar named Abu Toha Muhammad Adnan appeared. Both Abbasi and Adnan were members of Hefazat who used the term "Towhidi Janata".

== History ==
=== Bhola clashes ===
On October 20, 2019, activists of Towhidi Muslim Janata gathered in Borhanuddin, Bhola and alleged that a local Hindu youth had defamed Islam on social media. The activists burned down the home of a Hindu family and damaged 12 others. They engaged in violent clashes with the police which resulted in four deaths. Hefazat-e-Islam threatened the government with seize of Shapla Chattwar if they did not take action against police personals who shot at Towhidi Janata activists in Bhola. Locals in Bhola alleged the slogans of Towhidi Janata were raised by activists of Bangladesh Nationalist Party (BNP) and Jamaat-e-Islami.

=== Violence in Comilla, Chandpur, and Bandarban ===
In 2021, violence erupted following the alleged desecration of the Quran at a Durga Puja pavilion in Cumilla, which later spread to Hajiganj in Chandpur. Several temples were attacked, and clashes with the police occurred. A protest march was organized under the banner of Tawhidi Muslim Janata in Chandpur, during which demonstrators threw stones at Hindu temples. Clashes with the police led to the deaths of four people and injuries to fifty others.

In response to the same incident, on October 14, a protest gathering was held under the banner of Tawhidi Janata in the Lama Upazila Parishad area of Bandarban. Following the rally, attacks took place on the Lama Central Hari Temple and a Durga Puja pavilion. Additionally, Hindu-owned shops and businesses in the local market were vandalized and looted. These scattered incidents then snowballed into nationwide anti-Hindu riots.

=== Role in sculpture controversy ===
In December 2016, a sculpture resembling the Greek goddess Themis, symbolizing justice, was installed on the premises of the Supreme Court of Bangladesh. Hefazat-e-Islam and other religious groups, opposed the installation, stating that Tawhidi Janata would not accept sculptures or Murti. They demanded the removal of this statue as well as other sculptures across the country. Subsequently, in May 2017, the sculpture was removed.

In 2020, several Islamist groups opposed the planned construction of a sculpture of Sheikh Mujibur Rahman at the Dholairpar Square in Dhaka. They argued that sculptures were inappropriate from an Islamic perspective and announced a Tawhidi Janata-led movement to halt the construction.

=== Sheikh Mujibur Rahman's sculpture vandalization ===
In January 2025, a mural of Sheikh Mujibur Rahman in front of the Sylhet Deputy Commissioner's office was vandalized. Prior to this incident, Tawhidi Janata and local Islamic scholars had organized protests and demonstrations demanding its removal.

=== Dinajpur protests ===
On 25 February 2025, ring a women's football tournament in Hili, Dinajpur. Under the banner of Tawhidi Janata, a group organized a demonstration, claiming that sports were religiously prohibited. They attempted to halt the tournament, leading to clashes that resulted in at least ten people being injured.

=== Obstruction of events featuring female celebrities ===
On November 3, 2024, in Chattogram, local businessmen and Tawhidi Janata obstructed an event where actress Mehazabien Chowdhury was invited to inaugurate a showroom in the Riazuddin Bazar area of Station Road.

On January 25, 2025, actress Pori Moni was invited to inaugurate a shopping mall in Elenga, Tangail. However, Hefazat-e-Islam and the Jatiyo Olama Mashayekh Aimma Parishad opposed her presence, leading to the event's cancellation.

Similarly, on January 29, 2025, when actress Apu Biswas was invited to inaugurate a restaurant in Kamrangirchar, Dhaka, some Muslim groups expressed their opposition to her participation.

=== 2024 Shrine riots ===
In 2024, several shrines in Bangladesh were attacked and set on fire at different times. According to a report by the Manobadhikar Songskriti Foundation, nearly 12 such incidents occurred in September alone. This marked the first instance in Bangladesh where shrines were attacked following public declarations. The individuals involved in these attacks identified themselves under the banner of Tawhidi Janata.

In Narayanganj, Tawhidi Janata opposed the century-old Urs and fair held in honor of Sufi saint Shah Solaiman Lengta. Additionally, a shrine associated with Dewanbagh Pir in Mymensingh was attacked following online campaigns under the Tawhidi Janata banner. Similar attacks and arson incidents were carried out at the shrines of Doja Pir in Sherpur and Arshed Pagla in Shariatpur.

On 27 January 2025, Towhidi Janata attacked a shrine in Sylhet and looted the pet animals like goats and cows.

On February 20, 2025, the shrine of Shah Sufi Ayub Ali Darvesh in Noakhali was vandalized in an attack allegedly carried out by a group under the Tawhidi Janata banner.

=== Lalon Fair controversy ===
In November 2024, a cultural event titled Mohoti Sadhusang and Lalon Mela was canceled in Narayanganj following objections from Hefazat-e-Islam and local Tawhidi Janata. Hefazat-e-Islam claimed that the event promoted "distorted culture" under the guise of a Lalon festival. The district administration stated that the cancellation decision was made due to ongoing protests by mosque congregants and Hefazat-e-Islam, which raised concerns about law and order.

On February 14, 2025, violence erupted in Bhuapur Upazila of Tangail over the celebration of Boshonto Boron (Spring Festival) and Valentine's Day. A group under the Tawhidi Janata banner vandalized flower shops and staged protests in front of restaurants. As a result, Udichi Shilpigoshthi was forced to cancel their planned Spring Festival event. Additionally, anti-festival leaflets were distributed in Gopalpur Upazila, particularly targeting the Kite Festival, causing fear among organizers and leading to its cancellation.

The Dhaka Metropolitan Theatre Festival was also postponed due to threats from a group allegedly linked to Tawhidi Janata. The festival was scheduled to open on February 15, 2025, at the Mohila Samity Auditorium on Natok Sarani, Dhaka. However, on the evening of February 14, several individuals visited the venue, objected to the festival, and issued threats of violence if it proceeded.

=== Ekushey Book Fair clashes ===
In the 2025 Ekushey Book Fair, a group named Touhidi Janata attacked a stall named Sabyasachi for displaying books by exiled writer Taslima Nasrin, leading to its temporary closure. The government strongly condemned the incident, calling it a violation of citizens' rights. The Chief Adviser ordered the perpetrators to be brought under the law and instructed the police and Bangla Academy to strengthen security at the fair.

During another day of the Ekushey Book Fair in 2025, controversy arose over the sale of sanitary napkins at two stalls. Some Islamist groups labeled sanitary napkins as "private items" and demanded a ban on their public display and sale. In response to the complaints, Bangla Academy shut down the two stalls, citing fair regulations that only permit the sale of books and food items. The academy clarified that the decision was not targeted at sanitary napkins specifically but applied to all unauthorized products. However, Bangla Academy later issued a statement confirming that the free distribution of sanitary napkins at the book fair would continue.

=== Shahbag Police station blockade ===
On March 5, 2025, Bangladesh police arrested a man for allegedly harassing a female student of Dhaka University on the street over her attire. Later, a group of people identifying themselves as "Touhidi Janata" gathered in front of Shahbagh Thana, demanding the release of the arrested individual. The accused was subsequently sent to court, where he was granted bail. Later, the victim decided to withdraw the case due to pressure from "Touhidi Janata" and alleged threats of rape and death.

=== Nural Pagla shrine demolition ===
Mob under banner of Towhidi Janata rioted in a shrine of a cult leader "Nur al-Haque" known as Nural Pagla (Crazy Nur) who had claimed to be Imam Mahdi. The shrine was similar to Kaaba in structure it was given as main reason why it got demolished.

=== Mob against Baul ===
In November 2025, several Baul artists and their supporters were allegedly assaulted over religious blasphemy in Manikganj and Thakurgaon under the banner of "Tawhidi Jonota."

== Government stances ==
Adviser Mahfuj Alam threatened Towhidi Janata of taking legal actions against them if they do more violent activities. But he was criticized by many islamists for defaming the word "Tawhid". He later replied it and said "I warned Towhidi Janata, I didn't threatened them, I am also a Monotheist as a Believer Muslim. But I will not accept if anyone tries to spread extremism in name of Monotheism."

== See also ==
- Islamism
- Criticism of Islamism
