= Indians in Yemen =

Yemeni Indians
- (India) (Yemen)
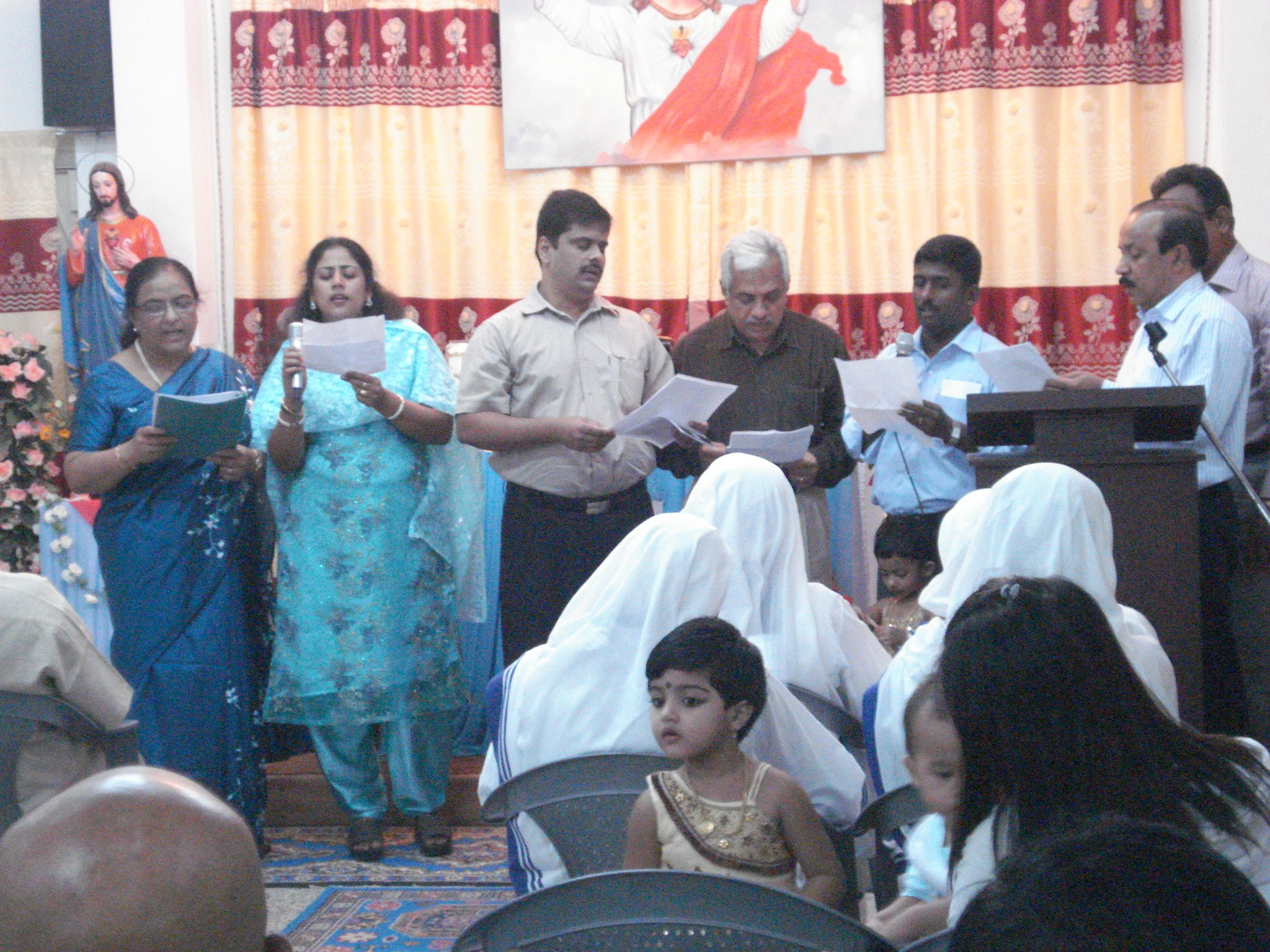
- Indian Christians at a church in Yemen on Christmas Eve

Total population
- 300,000

Regions with significant populations
- Sana'a, Aden, Al Hudaydah, Ibb, Taizz

Languages
- Arabic, Punjabi, Gujarati, Bengali and others Languages of India

Religion
- Predominantly Islam Minorities: Hinduism · Sikhism · Christianity

Related ethnic groups
- Indian Saudis

Yemeni Indians consist of people of Indian descent who were born in or immigrated to Yemen. Most are descendants of those who migrated from India during the Ancient era and British Raj. Yemeni Indians form the minority community of Overseas Indians in the world. They are usually simply referred to as "Indian" in Yemen.
