= Al-Yahudiyyaat wa al-Masihiyyaat =

1988 book by Ziaur Rahman Azmi

Al Yahudiyat wal Masihiyat
- Author: Ziaur Rahman Azmi
- Original title: اليهودية والمسيحية
- Language: Arabic
- Genre: Religion; Islam; Christianity; Judaism; History
- Published: 1988
- Publisher: Maktab al-Dar
- Publication place: Saudi Arabia

Al Yahudiyat wal Masihiyat (Arabic: اليهودية والمسيحية, Judaism and Christianity) is a research book by Ziaur Rahman Azmi on comparative religion, writing on Judaism and Christianity, published in 1988 by Maktab al-Dar, al-Madinah al-Munawara.

== History ==
This book is a compilation of the author's essays, which were published in "Majalat Al Jamiat Al-Islamiya Bill Madina Al Munawara (Madina Islamic University Magazine)" of Madina Islamic University. And then when he was appointed as a professor at the University of Madinah, he was also given the responsibility of teaching "Adiyan al-Alam (World Religion)". Among other things, given this responsibility, he created the text of "Religion" from the articles and then rearranged these articles for public use and published them in book form. Now these two books "Judaism and Christianity" (دراست في اليهودية و عديان النسرانية) and discusses the "Religion of India", titled Dirasat fil Yahudiyat wal Masihiyat wal Adianil Hind (دراسات في اليهودية والمسيحية واديان الهند, Studies in Judaism, Christianity and Indian Religions / Comparative Studies in Judaism, Christianity and Indian Religions), which contains 784 pages, due to its similarity in content, it is being published by Maktabat al-Rushd, a famous printing house in Saudi Arabia, and has released seven editions so far. The institute publishes this book every year as it is very popular among the teachers and students of the local Islamic University.

== Summary ==
In this book, Azmi discusses the origins and development of Judaism and Christianity. Abul Hasan Ali Hassani Nadvi wrote the introduction to the book. Azmi argues that these religions are distorted in their present form and have nothing to do with the religion revealed to Moses and Jesus. Azmi compares the arguments of Jewish and Christian scholars and the messages attributed to Muhammad.।
