= Abu Toha Muhammad Adnan =

Bangladeshi Islamic scholar, negotiator, and social activist

Shaykh Abu Toha Muhammad Adnan

Personal life
- Born: 1991 (age 34–35) Rangpur, Bangladesh
- Spouse: Habiba Nur (first); Sabikun Nahar Sara (second)
- Children: 2
- Notable work: Toha Jin Nurain Online Madrasah
- Education: Lions School and College, Rangpur; Rangpur Government College; Carmichael College
- Occupation: Islamic scholar, public speaker, negotiator, social activist
- Website: https://www.youtube.com/@TawHaaTv

Religious life
- Religion: Islam
- Denomination: Sunni
- Jurisprudence: Hanafi

Abu Toha Muhammad Adnan (born 1991) is a conservative Bangladeshi Islamic speaker, researcher, and YouTube personality. He gained recognition, especially among the youth, for his lectures on the Tafsir, hadiths, and contemporary social issues. In 2021, his disappearance became a subject of widespread national discussion and created a stir in the media.

== Biography ==
Although Abu Toha Muhammad Adnan's ancestral home is in Rajshahi, he spent his childhood at his maternal grandfather's house in Rangpur. After his father, Rafiqul Islam, died during his childhood, his mother, Ajefa Begum, moved with him to Rangpur. He grew up and spent his formative years there. Currently, he resides in the Ahle Hadith Mosque area on Central Road in Rangpur city. From a young age, he was interested in cricket and was known locally as a good cricketer. Later, he dedicated himself to religious and da'wah activities.

His formal education began at the age of seven when his mother sent him to learn the Quran from Maulana Nazrul Huzur. He later completed his secondary and higher secondary education at Lions School and College, Rangpur. Afterward, he enrolled at Carmichael College and earned his bachelor's and master's degrees in philosophy. Alongside his formal education, he received religious instruction from various scholars at Jamia Salafia Madrasah in Rangpur. He also acquired knowledge through self-study of Islamic books and research texts.

His first wife is Habiba Nur. The couple has a son and a daughter. His second wife's name is Sabikun Nahar Sara. She resides in Mirpur, Dhaka, and works as the director and a teacher at the Al-Idfan Islami Girls' Madrasah in Mirpur. According to media reports, there was some strain in his family life after his second marriage, which was later discussed in connection with his disappearance.

Adnan began broadcasting Islamic lectures on YouTube in 2017 and published his first video in 2019. His topics of discussion include signs of the Day of Judgment, the Antichrist, prophecies, social issues, and challenges facing Muslim society. He quickly gained popularity online due to his ability to explain contemporary issues from a religious perspective. In 2018, he won first place in an Islamic competition called "Alokito Gyani" (Enlightened Scholar), which further increased his recognition. Additionally, he established and directs the Toha Yin Nurain Online Madrasah.

== Disappearance ==
On 10 June 2021, Abu Toha went missing along with two companions and his driver while traveling from Rangpur to Dhaka. The incident caused widespread concern among his family and followers, and a campaign was launched on social media with the hashtag #saveAbuTohaAdnan to find him. His second wife, Sabikun Nahar, held a press conference on the matter and sought the intervention of the Prime Minister and the administration. Eight days later, on 18 June, he was found at his first wife's home in Rangpur. Subsequently, the Rangpur Metropolitan DB Police stated in a press conference that Abu Toha had gone into hiding voluntarily due to family disputes. He and his companions had been staying at a friend's house in Gaibandha. In June 2021, Bangladeshi Salafi Islamic scholar Abubakar Muhammad Zakaria quoted Abu Taha Muhammad Adnan criticizing his religious teachings. Both of them posted videos targeting each other on YouTube and Facebook.

== Views ==
On women's attire and social degradation, in a 2021 lecture he stated, "Just as it is essential for men to guard their gaze, it is also mandatory for women to wear modest clothing." A controversy arose surrounding one of his speeches, alleging that he blamed women's clothing for rape. However, media analysis later suggested that the context of his full speech was different, where he urged both men and women to maintain modesty.

He has expressed solidarity with Palestine and spoken out against Israeli aggression. At a seminar on the Palestine issue in Dhaka in 2023, he called for a boycott of Israeli products. He said, "The responsibility of protecting Masjid al-Aqsa and liberating the holy land of Palestine does not belong only to the Palestinians but to all Muslims worldwide." He has also participated in various rallies in support of Palestine.

He emphasizes the importance of showing respect to the Awliya Allah (friends of Allah) or religious saints. In one speech, he said, "Do not be disrespectful to the friends of Allah. Instead, ask for their prayers. And if you lack manners, at least practice staying silent." In 2021, a dispute arose with the organizers of a Waz Mahfil (religious gathering) in Bogura, where he allegedly did not speak for the full contracted time. The organizers accused him of snatching 36,000 Taka and a wristwatch, which was reported in the media. In January 2022, he was scheduled to speak at a Waz Mahfil in Faridpur but was unable to do so due to objections from the local administration.

After the disappearance incident, Abu Toha resumed his da'wah activities. He remains active at various Mahfils and on social media. In October 2024, he made a comment directed at the Bangladesh Chhatra League, which once again brought him into the discussion. He called on the Bangladesh Chhatra League to repent to Allah for their past actions and to ask for forgiveness from the people, expressing gratitude for their mistakes.

== Criticism and controversy ==
Abu Toha has faced criticism at various times for his activities and statements.

=== Bogra speech dispute ===
In 2021, during a religious gathering in Bogra, a dispute arose with the organizers because he did not deliver his speech for the full agreed duration. During this incident, the organizers accused him of taking 36,000 Taka and a wristwatch.

=== 2025 statement on women ===
In 2025, a statement attributed to Abu Taha sparked criticism, claiming that women going out without a mahram were responsible if they were assaulted.

=== Allegations by Sabiqun Nahar Sarah ===
In October 2025, Abu Toha's wife, Sabiqun Nahar Sarah, alleged that her husband had resumed a close relationship with his former college classmate, air hostess Jerin Jabin. She claimed that they were regularly in contact via phone and went on trips together. Later, Toha responded by stating that his mobile phone had been stolen and urged people not to spread false information. The following day, Sarah retracted her earlier statement, saying she had been wrongly influenced by jealous individuals, praised her husband, and reaffirmed her support for his work and intentions.

On 11 October, Sarah again posted regarding Toha's affair and stated that she had previously deleted her posts hoping he would reform, but as he did not, and because people were blindly believing him, she reposted her claims, emphasizing that her statements were true.

Following the allegations, Ainul Haque Qasemi, an Islamic scholar, publicly defended Toha, stating that Sarah could have remained silent and quietly accepted the situation instead of airing it publicly, and suggested that her posts had caused damage to Toha's reputation and to individuals associated with him. His remarks attracted widespread criticism for appearing to excuse Toha's alleged misconduct and for shifting responsibility onto the wife.
