= Studies in Judaism, Christianity and the Religions of India =

2001 book by Ziaur Rahman Azmi

Dirasaat Fi al-Yahudiyaat wa al-Maseehiyaat wa al-Adiyaan al-Hind
- Author: Ziaur Rahman Azmi
- Original title: دراسات في اليهودية والمسيحية وأديان الهند بها
- Language: Arabic
- Genre: Religion; Indian religion Islam; Christian; Judaism; History
- Published: 2001
- Publisher: Maktaba al-Rushd
- Publication place: Saudi Arabia
- Pages: 784 (Al-Rushd Library, 1st edition)

Studies in Judaism, Christianity and the Religions of India (Arabic: دراسات في اليهودية والمسيحية وأديان الهند, Dirasaat Fi al-Yahudiyaat wa al-Maseehiyaat wa al-Adiyaan al-Hind) is a research book written by Ziaur Rahman Azmi on comparative religion, published by Al-Rushd Library, Riyadh in 2001.

== History ==
This book is a collection of the author's articles, which were originally published in the "Majallat al-Jami'at al-Islamiyyah bi al-Madinah al-Munawwarah" (Magazine of the Islamic University of Madinah). And then, when he was appointed as a professor at Madinah University, he was also given the responsibility of teaching 'Adiyan Al-Alam (World Religions).' In addition to other subjects, with this responsibility, he created a syllabus for 'Religion' from various articles, and then rearranged these articles for public use and published them in book form. These two books, "Judaism and Christianity" (دراست في اليهودية و عديان النسرانية) and "Religions of India" named "Dirāsāt fī l-Yahūdiyya wa-l-Masiḥiyya wa-l-Ādiyān il-Hind" (درستاس في اليهودية والمسيحية) wa-adin al-hind, Studies in Jewish Religion, Christianity, and Indian Religions / A comparative study of Jewish, Christian, and Indian religions," have discussed Judaism, Christianity, and Indian religions." which has 784 pages, Due to the similarity in its content, it is being published by Maktabat al-Rushd, a renowned publishing house in Saudi Arabia, and seven editions have been released so far. The institution publishes this book every year because it is very popular among teachers and students at local Islamic universities.

== Summary ==
The book is divided into two parts:

=== Research on Judaism and Christianity ===
First edition: Maktab al-Dar, Al-Madinah al-Munawwarah, 1988. Azmi offers an analysis of the emergence and evolution of Judaism and Christianity in this book The introduction to the book was penned by Abul Hasan Ali Hasani Nadwi. Azmi contends that these religions, in their current state, have been distorted and bear no resemblance to the faiths revealed to Moses and Jesus. Azmi has conducted a comparative study of the arguments presented by Jewish and Christian scholars and the messages attributed to Muhammad. A Bangla translation of 'The History of the Jewish and Christian Nations,' translated by Mohammad Rokon Uddin, was published by Mohammad Publication in Bangladesh in 2020.

=== Research on Indian religions ===
First edition: Dar al-Bukhari, Al-Madinah al-Munawwarah, 1997. In this book, Azmi has described the four major religions of India: Hinduism, Buddhism, Jainism, and Sikhism, including their similarities and foundational principles. The book is a compilation of articles originally published in the 'Al-Jami'at al-Islamiyya' magazine of Medina. Later, when Azmi joined Jamia Islamia as a professor, he began teaching 'Adiyan al-Alam' (Religions of the World) among other subjects. In 2021, Kalanatar Publications in Bangladesh published a Bangla translation of the book titled 'History of Hinduism, Buddhism, Jainism, and Sikhism,' translated by Mahiuddin Qasmi.
