= Fortress of the Muslim =

1988 book of Islamic supplications

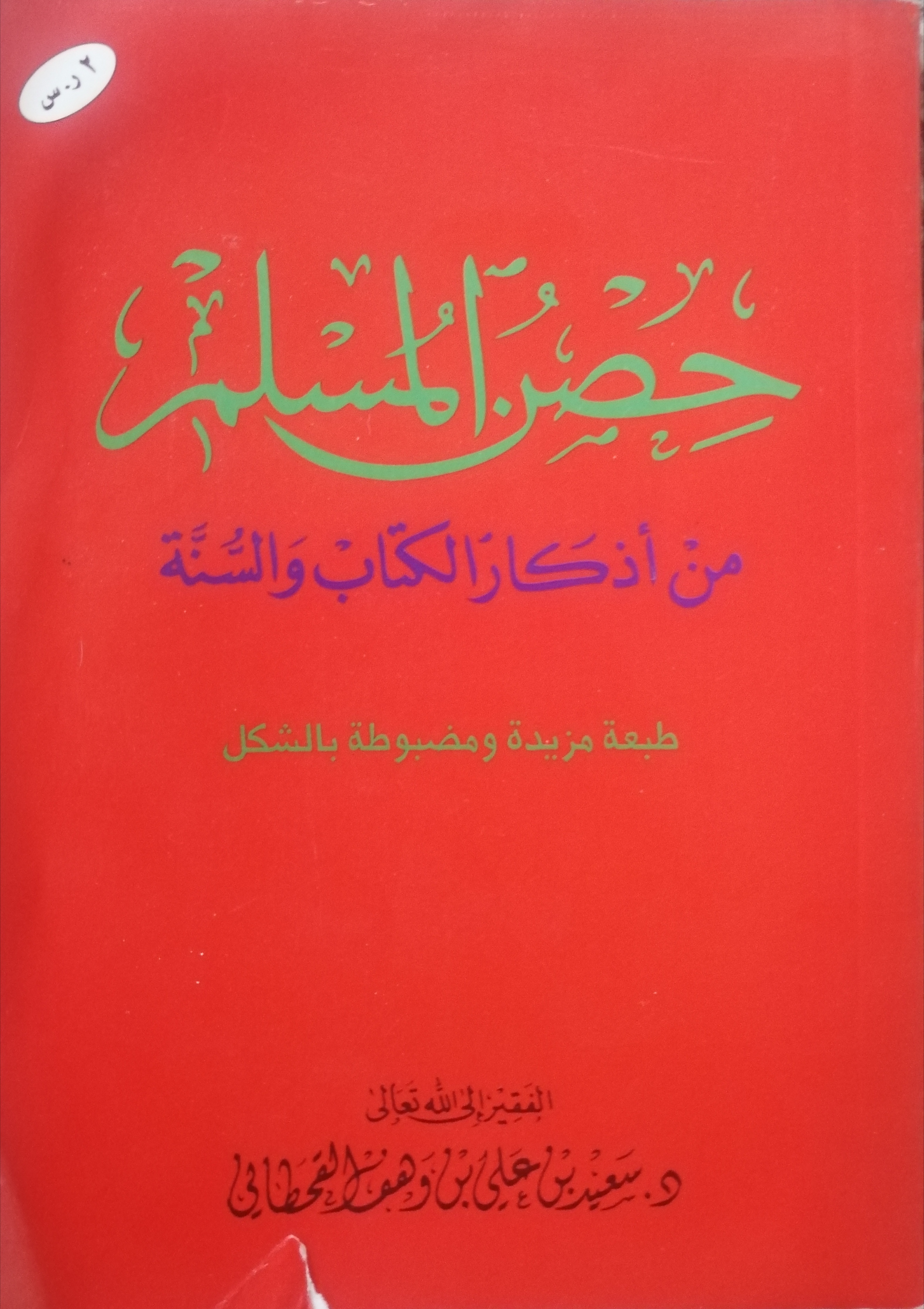
- Author: Sa'id bin Ali bin Wahf Al-Qahtani
- Original title: Arabic: حصن المسلم من أذكار الكتاب والسنة
- Translator: Ismael Ibraheem
- Language: Arabic
- Subject: dua
- Genre: prayer book
- Publication date: 1988
- Publication place: Saudi Arabia

Fortress of the Muslim (also Fortification of the Muslim; Arabic: حصن المسلم من أذكار الكتاب والسنة, romanized: ḥiṣn al-Muslim min ad͟hkār al-kitab wal-sunnah) is a book of supplications and invocations (dua) compiled by the Saudi Islamic scholar Sa'id bin Ali bin Wahf Al-Qahtani in October 1988.

Al-Qahtani received his doctorate from the College of the Fundamentals of Religion of the Imam Mohammad Ibn Saud Islamic University in Riyadh, which is considered to be a Wahhabi educational institution. Fortress is Al-Qahtani's most famous and popular book; it has been translated into many languages and used by believers irrespective of their proficiency in Arabic language. Every dua in translated editions is provided in Arabic and accompanied by a translation and a pronunciation guide to facilitate the following of the example of Muhammad in his constant usage of dua.

The supplications are grouped by occasion such as "dua to say before a meal"; there are 132 of them. The source for all of the dua that Al-Qahtani included in his book are various hadith collections and the Quran itself. Al-Qahtani put a lot of effort into presenting the dua in his book as the true and pure record of the Quran and the most sound of ahadith, which is typical for Salafi authors.

Fortress is very popular both among mainstream and Salafi Muslims, both recent converts and people born into ummah; they carry it with them and often try to memorise pages from it. The only Islamic book that outsells the Fortress in 2014 in Kazakhstan is the Quran. Several mobile applications with dua from the Fortress exist.

One of the reasons of this popularity is that Fortress is seen as an acceptable source by the people in support of the modern Islamic piety movement whose adherents donate money for the promotion of Islam such as book printing. By sponsoring the distribution of Fortress, they make sure that the believers recite the "correct" dua and not the customary ones, which may include asking the spirits of the ancestors for help – a practice seen as sinful by modernists. Fortress is also read by the members of the Kazakhstani neopagan movement Ata Zholy.

It is one of the many common Islamic books that are banned in Russia as "extremist literature", which, coupled with its ubiquity, is used to persecute Crimean Tatars and other Muslims living in Russia. For example, in 2016, a foreign citizen was fined and deported from Russia after the police found Fortress among her possessions during a search.

The book was translated into English by Ismael Ibraheem as Fortification of the Muslim through remembrance and supplication from the Quran and Sunnah in 1998.
