= Sahih Hadith =

Category of hadiths

Sahih Hadith (Arabic: الحديث الصحيح, al-Hadith al-Ṣaḥīḥ) in Hadith terminology, may be translated as "authentic hadith (prophetic narration)" or "sound hadith (prophetic narration)". Ibn Hajar defines a hadith that is ṣaḥīḥ lidhātihi ("ṣaḥīḥ in and of itself") as a singular narration (ahaad; see below) conveyed by a trustworthy, completely competent person, either in his ability to memorize or to preserve what he wrote, with a muttaṣil ("connected") isnād ("chain of narration") that contains neither a serious concealed flaw (ʻillah, Arabic:علة) nor irregularity (shādhdh). He then defines a hadith that is ṣaḥīḥ lighairihi ("ṣaḥīḥ due to external factors") as a hadith "with something, such as numerous chains of narration, strengthening it." In the Sunni branch of Islam, the canonical hadith collections are the six books (Kutub al-Sittah) listed below.

== Conditions ==
Ibn Hajar's definitions indicate that there are five conditions to be met for a particular hadith to be considered ṣaḥīḥ:

1. Each narrator in the chain of narration must be trustworthy;
2. Each narrator must be reliable in his ability to preserve that narration, be it in his ability to memorize to the extent that he can recall it as he heard it, or, that he has written it as he heard it and has preserved that written document unchanged;
3. The isnād must be connected (muttasil) insofar as it is at least possible for each narrator in the chain to have received the hadith from a predecessor;
4. The hadith, including its isnād, is free of ʻillah (hidden detrimental flaw or flaws, e.g. the establishment that two narrators, although contemporaries, could not have shared the hadith, thereby breaking the isnād.)
5. The hadith is free of irregularity, meaning that it does not contradict another hadith already established (accepted).

A number of books were authored in which the author stipulated the inclusion of ṣaḥīḥ hadith alone.

=== Ḥasan hadith ===
Ḥasan (حَسَن meaning "good") is used to describe hadith whose authenticity is not as well-established as that of ṣaḥīḥ hadith, but sufficient for use as supporting evidence.

Ibn Hajar defines a hadith that is ḥasan lithatihi – "ḥasan in and of itself" – with the same definition a ṣaḥīḥ hadith except that the competence of one of its narrators is less than complete; while a hadith that is ḥasan ligharihi ("ḥasan due to external factors") is determined to be ḥasan due to corroborating factors such as numerous chains of narration. He states that it is then comparable to a ṣaḥīḥ hadith in its religious authority. A ḥasan hadith may rise to the level of being ṣaḥīḥ if it is supported by numerous isnād (chains of narration); in this case that hadith would be ḥasan lithatihi ("ḥasan in and of itself") but, once coupled with other supporting chains, becomes ṣaḥīḥ ligharihi ("ṣaḥīḥ due to external factors").

== Collections ==
According to Sunni Islam, which reflects the beliefs followed by 80–90% of adherents of Islam worldwide, Sahih status was achieved by the first two books in the following list (known as "the six books" or Kutub al-Sittah):

1. Ṣaḥīḥ al-Bukhārī. Considered the most authentic book after the Quran.
2. Ṣaḥīḥ Muslim. Considered the next most authentic book after Ṣaḥīḥ al-Bukhārī.
3. Ṣaḥīḥ ibn Khuzaymah. Al-Suyuti was of the opinion that Ṣaḥīḥ Ibn Khuzaymah was at a higher level of authenticity than Ṣaḥīḥ Ibn Ḥibbān.
4. Ṣaḥīḥ Ibn Ḥibbān. Al-Suyuti also concluded that Ṣaḥīḥ Ibn Ḥibbān was more authentic than Al-Mustadrak alaa al-Ṣaḥīḥain.
5. al-Mustadrak ʻalā al-Ṣaḥīḥayn, by Hakim al-Nishaburi.
6. Al-Āhādith al-Jiyād al-Mukhtārah min mā laysa fī Ṣaḥīḥain by Ḍiyāʼ al-Dīn al-Maqdisī, authenticity considered.
7. Al-Jami al-Kamil by Ziya-ur-Rahman Azmi

Different branches of Islam refer to different collections of hadiths or give preference to different ones.

== See also ==
- Mutawatir hadith
