= Indian Saudis =

Saudis of Indian birth or descent

سعوديون الهنود

Total population
- 20,000

Regions with significant populations
- Mecca, Medina, Jeddah, Riyadh, Dammam, Jubail, Jizan

Languages
- Arabic • Hindi • Malayalam • Urdu • Telugu • Meitei

Religion
- Islam

Related ethnic groups
- Yemeni Indians

Indian Saudis or Indo-Saudis (Hindi: भारतीय सऊदी, romanized: Bhāratīya Saūdī; Arabic: سعوديون الهنود, romanized: Saʿūdīyūn al-Hunūd) are Saudis of Indian origin. They consist mainly of the descendants of Hajj pilgrims who hailed from the territories of Mughal, British, modern India or Pakistan and settled in Hejaz before or after the establishment of Saudi Arabia, immigrants and residents who were naturalized prior to the revocation of jus soli citizenship rights and children born to Saudi fathers under the jus sanguinis principle. Most Indo-Saudis adhere to Islam and speak Arabic and Urdu.

== Notable Indo-Saudis ==
- Abu Turab al-Zahiri, theologian and jurist
- Ziaur Rahman Azmi, theologian and scholar
- Muhammad Mustafa Azmi, scholar
- Abdulbasit Hindi, footballer

== See also ==
- Pakistanis in Saudi Arabia
