= Abubakar Muhammad Zakaria =

Bangladeshi Islamic scholar

Abubakar Muhammad Zakaria Mojumder
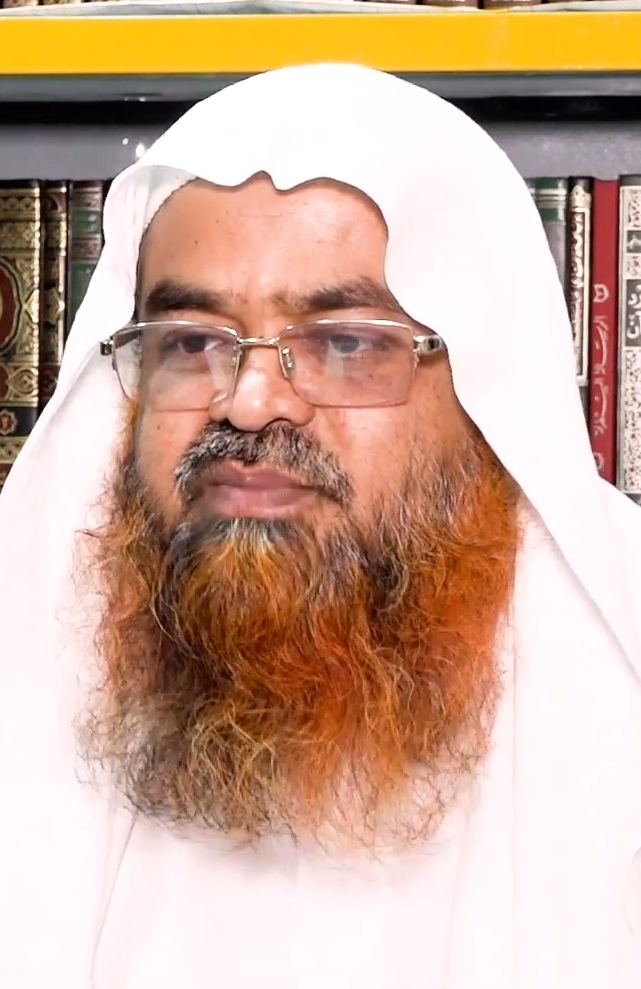

Personal life
- Children: 4 sons, 2 daughters
- Notable work(s): Tafsir Zakariya, Al-Hindusiyyah Wa Ta'assuru Fi Ba'dil Firaqil Islamiyyati Biha, Ash-Shirk Fil Qadim Wal Hadith, Comparative Religion and Muslim personalities
- Education: Islamic University of Madinah; Government Madrasah-e-Alia
- Known for: Media personality and writer
- Occupation: Professor, Al Fiqh and Law, Islamic University, Bangladesh
- Website: abubakarzakaria.com

Religious life
- Religion: Islam
- Denomination: Sunni
- Institute: Islamic University, Bangladesh
- Jurisprudence: Ghayr Muqallid
- Creed: Athari
- Movement: Salafi

Muslim leader
- Teacher: Muhammad Ibn Salih Al Uthaymin

Abubakar Muhammad Zakaria Mojumder (Bengali: আবু বকর মুহাম্মাদ যাকারিয়া মজুমদার) is a Bangladeshi Islamic scholar and lecturer. He is currently serving as a professor in the Department of Al Fiqh and Law at Islamic University Kushtia. He has been discussing Islamic programs and Islam in various newspapers and magazines on various Bangladeshi television channels, including NTV, Peace TV and so on.

He also gives sermons at various Islamic "mahfils" and pre-Jumah Khutba at various places. His "Tafsir Zakaria" has been published by King Fahad Printing Press, the official publication of Saudi Arabia, which is appreciated by the Muslim readers of Bengal. His two Arabic books, Al-Hundusiyyah Wa Ta'assuru Fi Ba'dil Firaqil Islamiyyati Biha and Shirk fil Kadim wal Hadith are very popular in the Arab world. Besides, his books are also in curriculum in public higher studies of Bangladesh.

== Education ==
Abu Bakr Zakaria received his early education from his father. He passed from Dhanusara Islamia Madrasa c. in 1982 and passed Alim in 1984. Then in 1986 he passed Fazil from the same madrasa. He was admitted to Dhaka Alia Madrasah in 1988. He was first in the first class in Kamil's combined merit list.

== Career ==
After completing his studies, Zakaria returned to Bangladesh and joined Islamic University, Bangladesh (IU) as a lecturer in the Department of Fiqh in 2005 as an incharge. He is also a founding member of Kulliyatul Qur'anil Karim Wad-Dirasatil Islamiyah, an Islamic Arabic educational institution in Bangladesh. He was a contemporary of IU teacher Khandaker Abdullah Jahangir, who simultaneously researched comparative theology and various subjects.

== Criticism ==
Muhammad Zakaria was quoted in June 2021 as criticizing Abu Taha Muhammad Adnan, another young Islamic speaker, for his religious teachings. Both of them posted videos on YouTube and Facebook targeting each other.

In September 2023, Bangladeshi cricketer Tanzim Hasan Sakib went viral in social media for sharing a comment Zakaria posted on his Facebook page a few years before, in which he discouraged women from being employed.

== Published books ==
Muhammad Zakariya has written books on Islam, including beliefs, Islamic law, hadith, interpretation of the Qur'an, and fiqh. The list of his books is as follows:

=== Bengali translations ===
- Sahih Hadith Encyclopedia (1st volume) (2021), the original author: Abu Ahmad Muhammad Abdullah Azami
- Dotana Dodulyaman (Editor, 2019), Original Author: Ibn Qayyim
- Let's listen to the story of Jannat (2019), Original author: Tanbir Hasan bin Abdur Rafiq
- Ablution in a Pure Method (2016), Original Author: Professor Muhammad Nurul Islam Makki
- Usulul Iman (2016), the original author: Mohammad Manzoor Elahi, ISBN 978-984-89271-6-8
- Taking Medium to Get Allah (2019), Original Author: Ahmad Bin Abdul Halim Ibn Taymi, ISBN 978-996-46927-55-6
- 30 Asr of Ramadan (2018), Original Author: Ali Hassan Tayyab, B ISBN 978-984-89271-1-3
- Hajj Umrah and Pilgrimage (2016), Original by Numan Abul Bashar and Ali Hasan Tayyab, B ISBN 978-984-89271-2-0
- Pure Faith is the best resource of life (2016), Original Author: Shamsul Haque Chowdhury
- Shaykhul Islam Ibn Taymiyyah (Memoirs, Editor) (2019), Original Author: Ustaz Moniruddin Ahmad, ISBN 978-984-34769-5-1
- How to prolong life (Editor, 2016) Original author: Muhammad Ibne Ibrahim An Naeem,
- Islam in Establishing Women's Rights (2019), Original Author: Muhsin Al Badr, B ISBN 978-984-34648-5-9
- Illustrated Guide to Islam (Editor, 2021), Original Author: I. A. Ibrahim
- In the vicinity of the great soul (2nd volume) (2021), the original authors: Imam Az-Zahabi and Muhammad Musa Ash-Sharif, B ISBN 978-984-89278-2-3
- In the vicinity of Mahatpran (Vol. 1) (2020), Original Author: Muhammad Musa Ash-Sharif, B ISBN 978-984-89278-0-9.
- Great Advice (2016 Editor), Original Author: Taqiuddin Ibn Taymiyyah
- Know and understand Salat (2021, compiled),
- Hisnul Muslim: Zikr, Doa and Medicine (2016) Original Author: Sa'id bin Ali bin Wahf Al-Qahtani ISBN 978-984-89270-8-3
- Umdatul Ahkam (2020), Original Author: Abdul Gani Al Makdisi, ISBN 978-984-89277-8-6

=== Original works ===
==== Bengali ====
In the Hajj of 2023, his two-volume Bengali tafseer published from King Fahd Glorious Quran Printing Complex has been given as a gift by the Saudi government to all the Bengali pilgrims.

- Tafseer-e-Zakaria (2013/2015), King Fahd Complex for the Printing of the Holy Quran ISBN 978-603-8187-58-6 (Set) ISBN 978-603-8187-59-3 (Volume 1) ISBN 978-603-8187-60-9 (Volume 2)
- Umrah (Visiting Medina, Doa) (2019), B ISBN 978-984-89277-7-9
- The provision of abortion in Islam (2016), co-author: Mostafa Hossain Shaheen, ISBN 978-984-89273-1-1
- Actions of Rasul (SAW) with non-Muslims (2016), co-author: Raghib Sarjani
- Batayan (26 selected articles from Muslim Media Blog) (2018)
- Women's Hajj and Umrah (2019), B ISBN 978-984-89276-8-7
- Muslim women and her responsibilities in the contemporary context (2019), co-author: Faleh Ibn Muhammad As-Sugair
- Rahman rises to the throne (2020)
- Tort Law in Islam (2013), co-author: Al-Amin, B ISBN 978-984-8927-06-9
- Speech of Eminent Scholars on Building / Organization, Building and Bai'at (2016), Co-Author: Abdul Alim Ibn Kawthar Madani
- Zakat and Sadaqah in Q&A (2016), co-author: Muhammad Nurul Islam Makki
- Comparative Religion and Muslim personality (2014) Co-author: Abdul Quader, Bangladesh University Grants Commission, ISBN 978-984-8920-046
- Usulul Iman (20--), co-author: Manzoor Elahi
- The major religions of the world (2021), co-author: Abdul Quader
- Know and understand the prayer
- Four basic terms of belief

==== Arabic ====
His book, Al-Hundusiyyah Wa Ta'assuru Fi Ba'dil Firaqil Islamiyyati Biha and the two books of Shirk fil Kadim wal Hadith are popular in the Arab world.

- , Al-Hundusiyyah Wa Ta'assuru Fi Ba'dil Firaqil Islamiyyati Biha (Arabic: الهندوسية وتأثر بعض الفرق الإسلامية بها, Hinduism and some Islamic sects influenced by it) ISBN 978-603-90755-6-1

The book Hindusiat, which he initially composed as a thesis under Saud bin Abdul Aziz al-Khalaf, he took the direct help of his teacher Ziaur Rahman Azmi in the composition and closely followed Azmi's book "Fusulun Fi Adyaan al-Hind" (Chapters on Indian religions).

- Ash-Shirk fil-Qadim Wal Hadith (Arabic: الشرك في القديم والحديث) (Ancient and modern shirk)

The book Shirk fil Qadim wal Hadith was also authors thesis under Ahmed bin Attia Al-Ghamdi, is very popular in Arab world as an academic book, many scholars have used this book as a reference in their written books and articles including Ali al-Sallabi.

- Aliahtimam bialsiyrat alnabawiat biallughat albanghaliat eard watahlil (Arabic: الاهتمام بالسيرة النبوية باللغة البنغالية عرض وتحليل), Interest in the biography of the Prophet in Bengali presentation and analysis
- Tarikh tatawur tarjamat maeani alquran alkarim 'iilaa allughat albanghalia (Arabic: تاريخ تطور ترجمة معاني القرآن الكريم إلى اللغة البنغالية), History of the development of translating the meanings of the Noble Qur'an into the Bengali language

His book Hindusiat wa Tasur was highly praised by Abdullah bin Salam al-Batati in the program "Al-Khajanah" of Zad TV owned by Muhammad Al-Munajjid and wished to be translated in English giving the book highly importance as a detailed work on Hinduism from the Islamic perspective.

==== Indonesian ====
His book Ash-Shirk fil-Qadim Wal Hadith has been partially translated into Indonesian by Abu Umamah Arif Hidayatullah as "Syirik pada Zaman Dahulu dan Sekarang". Besides, the same translator also translated some of his other works into Indonesian language.

=== Academic ===
His book "Hindusiyat wa Tasur" is in the Department of Dawah and Islamic Studies at Kushtia Islamic University. Another book "Comparative Theology and Muslim Manisha" in five courses of undergraduate, postgraduate, MPhil and PhD in the Department of Dawah and Islamic Studies, Kushtia Islamic University and one course in the syllabus of the postgraduate syllabus of the Department of Islamic Studies, University of Dhaka. Also a book titled "Comparative Review of Different Fiqhs" is included in a course of post graduate and MPhil of University of Chittagong.
