= Ziya-ur-Rahman Azmi =

Indian-born Saudi Arabian theologian (1943–2020)

- محمد ضياء الرحمان الأعظمي

Personal life
- Born: Banke Raam/Banke Laal
- Died: 30 July 2020 (aged 76–77) Medina, Saudi Arabia
- Notable work: Al-Jami al-Kamil
- Education: Shibli National College, Azamgarh; Darsgah Islami Intermediate College, Kakrala, Badaun; Jamia Darussalam; Islamic University of Madinah; Umm al-Qura University; Al-Azhar University
- Other names: Abū Aḥmad Muḥammad ʻAbdillāh Al-A’zami أبو أحمد محمد عبد الله الأعظمي
- Occupation: Author; professor; Dean; Islamic scholar

Religious life
- Religion: Islam
- Denomination: Sunni
- Jurisprudence: Ghayr Muqallid

Muslim leader
- Teacher: Ibn Humaid, Abdul-Aziz Ibn Baz
- Influenced by: Abul Ala Maududi
- Influenced: Zakir Naik, Abubakar Muhammad Zakaria

Abu Ahmad Muhammad Abdullah Azami or Ziya-ur-Rahman Azmi (also written as Dhiya-ur-Rahman A'zamī; 1943 – 30 July 2020) was an Indian-born Saudi Arabian Islamic scholar who served as the Dean of the Department of Hadith at the Islamic University of Madinah. He is known for his compilation of hadith titled Al-Jaami’ ul-Kamil fi al-Hadith al-Sahih al-Shamil which contains all authentic Prophetic narrations (sahih hadiths) as per his claim.

== Biography ==
Ziya-ur-Rahman Azmi was born Banke Laal into a Hindu Brahmin family in 1943 in Azamgarh. In 1959, he came across a Sanskrit translation of Quran and became interested in Islam through reading it. A few days later, he was gifted a booklet of Abul Ala Maududi named Satya Dharma (“true religion” in Hindi) by Hakeem Muhammad Ayyub Nadwi, who was a member of Jamaat-e-Islami Hind. After reading the book, he became further interested in Islam and began attending Islamic seminars by Jamaat-e-Islami Hind. In 1960, at age 15, he formally embraced Islam. After converting to Islam, he received extreme opposition from his upper-caste Hindu family and community. He received his primary education in a local school and then enrolled at the Shibli National College in Azamgarh. He began studying the traditional dars-e-nizami at the Jamia Darussalam in Oomerabad, and received a B.A. and an M.A. in Islamic studies from the Islamic University of Madinah and the Umm al-Qura University respectively. He wrote his doctoral thesis at the Al-Azhar University.

Azmi was appointed professor at the Islamic University of Madinah and was later awarded Saudi Arabian citizenship. He died on 30 July 2020.

== Books ==
Azmi authored al-Jaami’ ul-kamil fi al-hadith al-sahih al-shamil, also known as Jami ul Kamil, a collection of all sound hadith narrations as per his claim. According to Islamic scholar Muhammad Ishaq Bhatti, "this is such a work that no one has done before."

Azmi collected and compiled all the available traditions from Abu Hurairah after an Egyptian hadith rejector Muhammad Aburiyah wrote Abū Hurayrah wa marwīyatih following in the footsteps of Goldziher. Azmi named the compilation as ''Abū Hurayrah wa marwīyatih and wrote several detailed discourses in it defending the hadith. He gained access to rare manuscripts of Aqḍiyat Rasūl Allāh, a work by Andalusian Maliki scholar, Muḥammad ibn Faraj Ibn al-Ṭallā, who lived between 404 AH and 497 AH. Azmi studied these manuscripts and gave the general Islamic academia its access. His works include:

Arabic

- Jami ul Kamil
- Abū Hurayrah fī ḍawʼ marwīyatih: dirāsah muqāranah fī miʼat ḥadīth min marwīyātih
- Dirāsāt fī al-jarḥ wa-al-taʻdīl
- al-Minnah al-kubrá: sharḥ wa-takhrīj al-Sunan al-ṣughrá lil-Ḥāfiẓ al-Bayhaqī
- Muʻjam muṣṭalaḥāt al-ḥadīth wa-laṭāʼif al-asānīd
- Dirāsāt fī al-Yahūdīyah wa-al-Masīḥīyah wa-adyān al-Hind (Comparative Study of Judaism, Christianity and Indian Religions)
- Al-Yahudiyyaat wa al-Masihiyyaat
- Fuṣūl fī adyān al-Hind: al-Hindūsīyah wa-al-Būdhīyah wa-al-Jaynīyah wa-al-Sīkhīyah wa-ʻalāqat al-taṣawwuf bi-hā (Chapters on the religions of India: Hinduism, Buddhism, Jainism, Shikhism, and the relations of Sufism to them)
- Tahiyyat al-Masjid

Hindi

- कुरान की शीतल छाया (Cool shade of Quran)
- कुरान विश्वकोश (Quran encyclopedia)
