= Sa'id bin Ali bin Wahf Al-Qahtani =

Saudi Arabian scholar and writer (1952–2018)

Sa'id bin Ali bin Wahf Al-Qahtani (Arabic: سعيد بن علي بن وهف القحطاني;1952–2018) was a Saudi Arabian Muslim scholar and writer. Qahtani was born in the village of Al-Arin, 'Asir region, in 1952.

He Al-Qahtani received a doctorate from the College of the Fundamentals of Religion of the Imam Mohammad Ibn Saud Islamic University in Riyadh, which is considered to be a Salafi/Sunni educational institution. Later, he served as the imam of a mosque in Saudi Arabia. He has authored about eighty books, the most famous of which is the 1988 book Hisn al-Muslim (Fortress of the Muslim). He also wrote a biography of Muhammad, Rahmatan li‑l‑Ālamīn: Muhammad Rasūl Allāh (Mercy to the Worlds: Muhammad Messenger of God).

He was suffering from liver cancer and died on October 1, 2018, in Riyadh.
