= Abd al-Haqq al-Hashimi =

Islamic scholar and author (1884–1972)

Abdul Haqq bin Abdul Wahid Al Hashemi
- Title: Al-Sheikh; Al-Allamah; Al-Muhaddith; Al-Hafiz; Al-Musnad Al-Ilmi; Mudamir Al-Shirk wal Bid'ah

Personal life
- Born: Sheikh Abdul Haqq; 1884 Kotla Shaikhan, Bahawalpur, Punjab Province, British India
- Died: 24 November 1972 (aged 87–88) Mecca, Saudi Arabia
- Resting place: Jannat Al-Baqi
- Children: Abdur Razzaq Al-Hashemi; Abu Turab Al-Hashemi; Abdul Wakeel Al-Hashemi; Abdul Wali Al-Hashemi; Abdul Jalil Al-Hashemi; Muhammad Hashem Al-Hashemi
- Parent: Sheikh Abdul Wahid (father)
- Relatives: Sheikhs of Kotla Shaikhan Bahawalpur

Religious life
- Religion: Islam
- Denomination: Sunni
- School: Hanafi
- Creed: Athari
- Movement: Salafism

Abd al-Haqq al-Hashimi (1884–1972) was an Islamic scholar, orator and author in the Indian Subcontinent in the 20th Century. Al-Hashemi was a Muhaddith, a scholar of Hadith who was influential in Saudi Arabia and the Indian Subcontinent, in particular the southern region of Punjab, his region of birth. He was a teacher of many modern-day scholars.

== Early life and background ==
Sheikh Abdul Haqq bin Abdul Wahid Al-Hashemi was born in 1884 to Sheikh Abdul Wahid in his ancestral family estate Kotla Sheikhan in Bahawalpur, in Southern Punjab, present-day Pakistan into a Farooqui Sheikh family. His nisba Al-Hashemi is not a reference to descent from Hashem bin Abd Manaf, ancestor of the Islamic prophet Muhammad but instead is a reference to Abdul Haqq's great-grandfather Sheikh Hashem Farooqui. Abdul Haqq was the only child and son of his parents that had survived past infancy. His father Abdul Wahid was a local Islamic leader in his area who had desired to dedicate his only surviving child Abdul Haqq to Islamic scholarship and missionary works.

== Education ==
The education of Abdul Haqq Al-Hashemi began with his father Sheikh Abdul Wahid who himself was a local Muslim scholarly figure, it was by his supervision that Al-Hashemi completed his Hifz, memorisation of the Qur’an. He was also taught the Persian language, the traditional court language of the Muslim-ruled Indian subcontinent by his father, along with learning the grammar and syntax of Arabic with him. After completing his education with his father, his father had ordered him to seek knowledge from other places.

Al-Hashemi at the request of his father had travelled to centres of Islamic learning in major cities such as Multan, Delhi, Batala and other smaller towns and villages where he had studied under prominent scholars of the Indian Subcontinent of his time. He states in his autobiography that he had studied under around sixty scholars, Arabic rhetoric and poetry, principles of Islamic jurisprudence, interpretation of the Holy Qur’an and other Shariah disciplines such as the science of Hadith, etc.

Among his teachers was Isa bin Ahmed Rai’i with whom he studied the grammar of the Arabic language along with the six canonical books of Hadith such as Sahih Bukhari, Sahih Muslim, Sahih Tirmidhi, etc. He also studied Mishkat, some parts of Tafsir At-Tabari, Imam Bayhaqi books al-Asma wa's-Sifa. Rai’i himself was a student of Mahmudul Hasan Deobandi. He also studied with Muhammad bin Abdullah Riyasati from whom he received a Ijazah al-Riwayah, Riyasati was a student of Sayyid Nazir Hussain. Another scholar he studied with was Imamuddin bin Muhammad Qanbari who he studied hadith with. Another scholar who he studied under was Muhammad bin Abu Muhammad Ghayti, he had studied the Muwatta of Imam Malik with him. He had also studied under many other scholars as part of his seeking of Islamic knowledge. He on the course of his study had studied several books in regard to Ahadith such as al-Muwatta, Sahih al-Bukhari, Sahih Muslim, Jam’e al-Tirmidhi, Sunan Abu Dawud, Sunan al-Nasa’i, Sunan Ibn Majah, Musnad Tayalisi, Musnad al-Darimi, Musnad Ahmad, Masanid Ibn Hanifah Mu’ajam al-Tabarani al-Saghir, Sahih Ibn Hibban, Musnad Abu Ya'la, Musnad al-Bazzar, Musnad al-Firdaws, Taysir al-Wusul of Ibn al-Dabi’a, Jam’e al-Usul of Ibn Athir, Majma’a al-Zawa’id of al-Haithami, Kunz al-A’mal of Muttaqi and al-Minhaj of Muttaqi. He studied the following with regards to the science of Hadith, al-Nukhbah of Ibn Hajr and its Sharh, al-Fiyyah of Iraqi and its Sharh by the author and al-Sakhawi. When it came to matters in Fiqh, he had studied books such as Risalah Imam al-Shafi’i and his al-Umm, Ibn Qudamah, Usul of Ibn al-Hajib, Usul of Qadi Baydawi, Mudawwanah al-Kubra of Sakhnun, al-Mughni of Ibn Qudamah, Sharh al-Muhazzab of Nawawi. He gained knowledge in Aqidah from studying books such as Sharh al-Aqaid al-Nasafiyyah, Aqidah Tahawiyyah and its Sharh, al-Asma wal-Sifat of Baihaqi, along with looking at works of Ibn Taymiyyah. He also studied Islamic history, Tarikh with his Shuyukh, he looked through books such as Tabaqat Ibn Sa’d, al-Isabah of Ibn Hajr, Usad al-Ghabah of Ibn al-Athir, al-Tajrid of Dhahabi.

Al-Hashemi was also a scholar of the Hanafi school of Jurisprudence.

== Career ==
Al-Hashemi was appointed as Qadi and Imam of the Al-Abbassi Masjid in his home region Bahawalpur in Southern Punjab.

Al-Hashemi had taught Islamic sciences for about 70 years, about 45 years in the Indian subcontinent and 25 years in Makkah in Saudi Arabia following a royal decree from the King of Saudi Arabia of the time, Sheikh Abdul Aziz bin Abdur Rahman Al-Saud. During his time in the Indian Subcontinent as a scholar, after he was authorised to become a teacher of Islamic sciences by his teachers, he held his first learning circle in the city of Ahmedabad, also known as New Baghdad.

Al-Hashemi had arrived in the city of Mecca to perform the Hajj, during this he had discussions with other scholarly figures. After seeing his level of knowledge on Islamic sciences and the Musnad, they sought to have him as a teacher in Makkah. The scholars of Mecca thus sought a royal decree from Abdul Aziz Al-Saud and the then chief-justice Sheikh Abdullah bin Hassan Al-Ash-Sheikh appointing him as a teacher in the Grand Mosque of Makkah in the year of 1948. Al-Hashemi then had his son Sheikh Abu Turab ship his library of his works to Makkah, Abdul Haqq Al-Hashemi remained a teacher there until his death in 1972.

One of his most prominent students was Abdullah bin Abdul Aziz Al-Baz.

== Works ==
Sheikh Abdul Haqq Al-Hashemi had authored numerous works, numbering around eighty, some of these are listed below;

- Tafsir al-Quran bil-Quran Wal-Sunnah – 9 volumes
- Sharh al-Bukhari
- Sharh Muslim
- Sharh Muwatta
- Nusrah al-Bari Fi Sharh Tarajim al-Bukhari – 4 Volumes
- Mashariq al-Anwar Fi Sharh Ma Fi al-Muwatta wal-Sahihayn Min al-Akhbar – 14 volumes.
- Kashf al-Mughta An Rijal al-Sahihayn wal-Muwatta
- Miftah al-Muwatta wal-Sahihayn – 7 Volumes
- Kitab al-Lubab Fi Sharh al-Tarajim wal-Abwab – 7 Volumes
- Atraf al-Musnad – 2 Volumes
- Sharh Musnad Imam Ahmad
- Fihrisah Musnad al-Imam Ahmad
- Tarajim Rijal al-Musnad Imam Ahmad – 4 Volumes
- Sharh Muqaddimah Sahih Muslim – 1 Volume
- Tarajim Rijal al-Sahihayn – 1 Volume
- Thabt al-Marwayat – 1 Volume
- Kitab al-Nahw – 1 Volume
- Raf’a al-Lawmah An Wadeh al-Yadain Fil Qaumah
- Kitab al-Arba’in Ala Sayyid al-Kawnayn
- Kitab al-Tamin Bil-Jahr
- Kitab Raf al-Yadain Fis Salah – 1 Volume
- Kitab Qirah Khalf al-Imam – 1 Volume
- Kitab al-Khilafah al-Rashidah – 1 Volume
- Kitab al-Jihad – 1 Volume
- Kitab Ahwal al-Hashr – 1 Volume
- Kitab Kashf al-Iqnah Fi Du’a Badal Salah Bi-Halah al-Ijtimah
- Fath al-Wudud Fi Raf al-Yadain Ind al-Sujud
- Musannaf Sahihayn – 9 Volumes
- Musnad Sahihayn
- Kitab Jam’a Bayna Manzumah al-Amir al-Yamani, wal-Fiyyah al-Iraqi wal-Suyuti
- Sharh Manzumah al-Amir al-Yamani
- Sharh al-Fiyyah al-Suyuti
- Kitab al-Maghazi
- Kitab al-Siyar – 1 Volume
- Muqaddimah Sharh al-Musnad al-Imam Ahmad – 1 Volume
- Qabaih al-Yahud
- Dalail al-Risalah al-Muhamadiyyah
- Kitab al-Takhrij Ahadith al-Musnad
- Al-Jam’a Bayna al-Sihah Sittah (incomplete)
- Khayr al-Khbar Fi Sharh Himal al-Athar incomplete
- al-Badur al-A’rijah Bayna al-Fusha wal-Dirajah
- Kitab al-Fawaid wal-Ta’qabat
- Kahsf al-Ghamzah An Mutraddad Fi Miqat al-Makki Lil-Umrah
- Iqamah al-Hujjah Binna Matamta Alayhi al-Sa’yan Sai al-Umrahwa Sai al-Hujjah
- Nasb al-Umud Fi Tahqiq masalah tajafi al-mirah fil ruku wal sujud
- Al-Muwazanah bayna musnadi al-imamayn ahmad bin hanbal wa baqi bin makhlad
- Masalah al-zakah fima zad alal nasb
- Ijazah al-riwayah
- Ithbat Inn al-hajr wal-maqam minal jannah
- Tahqiq hadith salah musa alayhis salam fi qabrihi
- Al-Rubaayat al-mansubah ilal Bukhari
- Azan al-tarjih Sunnah matrukah
- Qadm ashbab al-hadith
- Tahqiq masalah haram al-madinah
- Masalah azan al-jawq
- Manaqashah amali Mahmud al-hasan hawl sahih al-bukhari
- Ithbat tazawuj umm kulthum min umar bin al-khattab
- al-Radd Ibn al-Turkamani
- Nazam Rijal al-Sahihayn
- Aqidah Firqatun Najiyyah

== Death ==
Al-Hashemi died while he was still a teacher at Darul Hadith school in Makkah in 1972.

== Family ==
He had six sons and three daughters, who all became figures of knowledge. His eldest son was the acclaimed scholar of Hadith, Abdur Razzaq Al-Hashemi. His second son was the scholar, Abu Turab Al-Hashemi, his third son was Abdul Wakeel Al-Hashemi, his fourth son was Abdul Wali Al-Hashemi, his fifth son was Abdul Jalil Al-Hashemi and his sixth son was Muhammad Hashem Al-Hashemi.

== Students ==
He had many students that became prominent in the world of Islamic knowledge, some of these are:

- Sultan Mahmud Jalalpuri
- Badi al-Din Sindhi
- Muhibullah Shah a-Rashidi
- Abdus Samad Sharf al-Din Dehlawi
- Muhammad bin Abdullah al-Sumali
- Muhammad ibn Ibrahim Al-ash-
- Abdullah bin Muhammad bin Humaid
- Abd al-Aziz ibn Abdullah ibn Baz
- Suleiman al-Sani’a
- Hamad al-Ansari
- Isma’il al-Ansari
- Umar bin Muhammad Fullatah
- Abdullah Laknawi
- Abd al-Rahman Mazhar
- Muhammad bin Abd Allah Ad Shanqiti al-Madani
- Naji bin Muhammad Sayf al-Makhlafi
- Muhammad al-Hasan al-Hashimi
- Abd Allah bin Abd al-Aziz bin Aqil
- Muhammad bin Abdullah bin Subayyal
- Yahya bin Uthman al-Mudarris al-Azimabadi
- Thanullah Madani
- Abd al-Aziz bin Abdullah bin Sa’id al-Zahrani
- Suleiman bin Salim bin Abd Allah al-Luhaibi al-Harbi
- Abu Abdur Rahman bin Aqil al-Zahiri
- Muhammad bin Ahmad al-Timbuktui
- Muhammad bin Abdul Sattar Dehlawi
- Abd Allah bin Bukhit
- Uthman Kiyta al-Madani
- Ahmad bin Ali al-Huraibi
- Abdullah bin Ahmad al-Hakami
- Ahmad al-Husami
- Salim bin Ahmad bin A’fif
