= Military Service Act =

Military Service Acts were introduced to enact conscription:

- Military Service Act 1916, introduced in January 1916 in the UK during World War I
- Military Service Act (Canada), introduced in Canada in 1917 during World War I
- Military Service Act 1939, introduced in the United Kingdom in 1939 in the run-up to World War II
- Military Service Act (South Korea), enacting conscription in South Korea
- Military Service Act (Taiwan), enacting conscription in Taiwan

== See also ==
- Military Selective Service Act, in the United States
- National Service Act (disambiguation)
- Selective Service Act (disambiguation)
