= Selective Service Act =

Selective Service Act may refer to:

- Selective Service Act of 1917, or Selective Draft Act, enacted April 28, 1917, for the American entry into World War I
- Selective Training and Service Act of 1940, enacted September 16, 1940, in preparation for the American entry into World War II
- Selective Service Act of 1948, enacted June 24, 1948, now known as the Military Selective Service Act

== See also ==
- Military Service Act (disambiguation)
- National Service Act (disambiguation)
