= HR 163 =

The designation HR 163 may refer to:

- The Universal National Service Act, a piece of proposed United States legislation.
- Epsilon Andromedae, a star.
