= AMPC =

AMPC may refer to:

- A More Perfect Constitution
- Amoxicillin, by trade name AMPC
- The Royal Pioneer Corps, part of the British Army previously called the Auxiliary Military Pioneer Corps
- The classic edition of the Amplified Bible
