= Second Constitutional Convention of the United States =

Political proposal

The calling of a Second Constitutional Convention of the United States is a proposal made by some academics and activists from across the political spectrum for the purpose of making substantive reforms to the federal government of the United States by rewriting the U.S. Constitution.

== Background ==
Since the initial 1787–88 debate over ratification of the Constitution, there have been sporadic calls for the convening of a second convention to modify and correct perceived shortcomings in the Federal system it established. Article V of the Constitution provides two methods for amending the nation's frame of government. The first method authorizes Congress, "whenever two-thirds of both houses shall deem it necessary" to propose constitutional amendments. The second method requires Congress, "on the application of the legislatures of two-thirds of the several states" (presently 34), to "call a Convention of States for proposing amendments".

In 1943, Alexander Hehmeyer, a lawyer for Chicago-based Marshall Field's department store as well as Time Inc., wrote A Time for Change (Farrar & Rinehart), in which he proposed a second Constitutional Convention to streamline the federal government. In the late 1960s, Illinois Senator Everett Dirksen called for a constitutional convention by appealing to state legislatures to summon one.

Three times in the 20th century, concerted efforts were undertaken by proponents of particular issues to secure the number of applications necessary to summon an Article V Convention. These included conventions to consider amendments to provide for popular election of U.S. Senators, permit the states to include factors other than equality of population in drawing state legislative district boundaries, and to propose an amendment requiring the U.S. budget to be balanced under most circumstances. The campaign for a popularly elected Senate is frequently credited with "prodding" the Senate to join the House of Representatives in proposing what became the Seventeenth Amendment to the states in 1912, while the latter two campaigns came very close to meeting the two-thirds threshold in the 1960s and 1980s, respectively. In 2013, the number of states calling for a convention to consider a balanced budget amendment was believed to be either 33 or 20, and the tally may depend on rulings about whether past state applications have been rescinded. In 1983, Missouri applied; in 2013, Ohio applied.

In January 1975, Congressman Jerry Pettis, a Republican from California, introduced a concurrent resolution (94th H.Con.Res.28) calling a convention to propose amendments to the Constitution. In it, Pettis proposed that each state would be entitled to send as many delegates to the convention as it had Senators and Representatives in Congress and that such delegates would be selected in the manner designated by the legislature of each state. On August 5, 1977, Representative Norman F. Lent, Republican from New York, introduced a similar concurrent resolution (95th H.Con.Res.340). Both were referred to the House Judiciary Committee. No further action on either was taken.

A report in the Pittsburgh Post-Gazette in 2011 described the movement for a convention as gaining "traction" in public debate, and wrote that "concern over a seemingly dysfunctional climate in Washington and issues ranging from the national debt to the overwhelming influence of money in politics have spawned calls for fundamental change in the document that guides the nation's government." For several years, state lawmakers approved no Article V Convention calls at all, and even went so far as to adopt resolutions rescinding their prior such calls. However, in 2011, legislators in Alabama, Louisiana, and North Dakota (in two instances) approved resolutions applying for an Article V Convention. All three of these states had adopted rescissions in 1988, 1990, and 2001, respectively, but then reversed course in 2011. The same was true in 2012 with New Hampshire lawmakers who had adopted a resolution to rescind previous convention applications as recently as 2010.

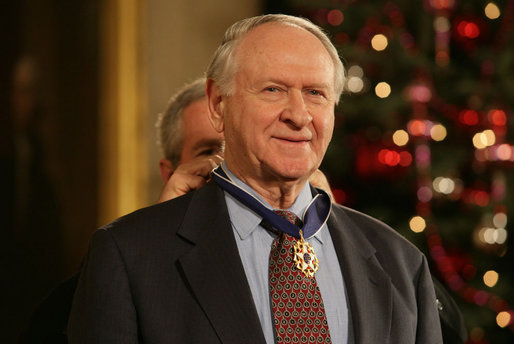
Columnist William Safire

A report by analyst David Gergen on CNN suggested that despite serious differences between left-leaning "Occupy" movements and the right-leaning "Tea Party" movements, there was considerable agreement on both sides that money plays "far too large a role in politics." Scholars such as Richard Labunski, Sanford Levinson, Lawrence Lessig, Glenn Reynolds, Larry Sabato, and newspaper columnist William Safire have called for constitutional changes that would curb the dominant role of money in politics. Scholar Stein Ringen in his book Nation of Devils suggested that only a "total overhaul" of the constitution could fix the "years of accumulated damage and dysfunction," according to a report in the Economist in 2013. French journalist Jean-Philippe Immarigeon suggested in Harper's Magazine that the "nearly 230-year-old constitution stretched past the limits of its usefulness". A 2011 report in USA Today suggested that 17 of the required 34 states had petitioned Congress by then for a convention to deal with the issue of a balanced budget amendment. A report on CNN suggested that 30 state legislatures are considering resolutions either calling for a constitutional convention or else proposing changes to the Constitution. David O. Stewart suggested that possible topics for constitutional amendments might include the elimination of the electoral college and switching to direct election of the president, a ban on procedures in the United States Senate which utilize a supermajority vote requirement as a means to prevent minorities or powerful Senators from blocking legislation, term limits for Senators and Representatives, and a balanced budget amendment.

== Convention of States ==
Convention of States map (20) Passed Convention of States Resolution (5) Passed One Chamber (15) Active Legislation (11) No Action

A Convention of States is one of two methods authorized by Article Five of the United States Constitution whereby amendments to the United States Constitution may be proposed: two thirds of the State legislatures (that is, 34 of the 50) may call a convention to propose amendments, which become law only after ratification by three-fourths (38) of the states. The Article V convention method by States has never been used.

== Questions ==
Numerous questions surround the issue of how such an unprecedented convention might be conducted. There is no consensus on how such a convention may be organized, led, or who may be selected to be in such a body.

Because there has not been a constitutional convention since 1787, efforts have been clouded by unresolved legal questions: Do the calls for a convention have to happen at the same time? Can a convention be limited to just one topic? What if Congress simply refuses to call a convention? Scholars are split on all those issues.

— report in the Indianapolis Star, 2011

=== Precedent ===
While there is no precedent for such a convention, scholars have noted that the original 1787 Convention, itself, was the first precedent, as it had only been authorized to amend the Articles of Confederation, not to draw up an entirely new frame of government. According to The New York Times, the action by the Founding Fathers set up a precedent that could be used today. But, since 1787, there has not been an overall constitutional convention. Instead, each time the amendment process has been initiated since 1789, it has been initiated by Congress. All 33 amendments submitted to the states for ratification originated there. The convention option, which Alexander Hamilton (writing in The Federalist No. 85) believed would serve as a barrier "against the encroachments of the national authority", has yet to be successfully invoked, although not for lack of activity in the states.

=== Scope of a possible convention ===
There have been calls for a second convention based on a single issue such as the Balanced Budget Amendment. According to one count, 17 of 34 states have petitioned Congress for a "convention to propose a balanced budget amendment." But Congress has been reluctant to "impose limitations on its spending and borrowing and taxing powers", according to anti-tax activist David Biddulph. Law professor Michael Stokes Paulsen suggested that such a convention would have the "power to propose anything it sees fit" and that calls for a convention to focus on only one issue "may not be valid", according to this view. According to Paulsen's count, 33 states have called for a general convention, although some of these calls have been pending "since the 19th century."

According to a New York Times report, different groups would be nervous that a convention summoned to address only one issue might propose a wholesale revision of the entire Constitution, possibly limiting "provisions they hold dear." Such groups include the American Civil Liberties Union, the John Birch Society, the National Organization for Women, the Gun Owners Clubs of America and conservative advocate Phyllis Schlafly. Accordingly, they are opposed to the idea of a second convention. Lawrence Lessig countered that the requirement of having 38 states ratify any proposed revision—three-quarters of all state legislatures—meant that any extreme proposals would be blocked, since either 13 red or 13 blue states could block such a measure.

=== Language ===
Constitutional law scholar Laurence Tribe noted that the language in the current Constitution about how to implement a second one is "dangerously vague", and that there is a possibility that the same interests that have corrupted Washington's politics may have a hand in efforts to rewrite it. Politicians and scholars who are reluctant to have a second constitutional convention may insist that all 34 state petitions to Congress must have an identical wording or otherwise the petitions would be considered invalid.

== Particular views ==
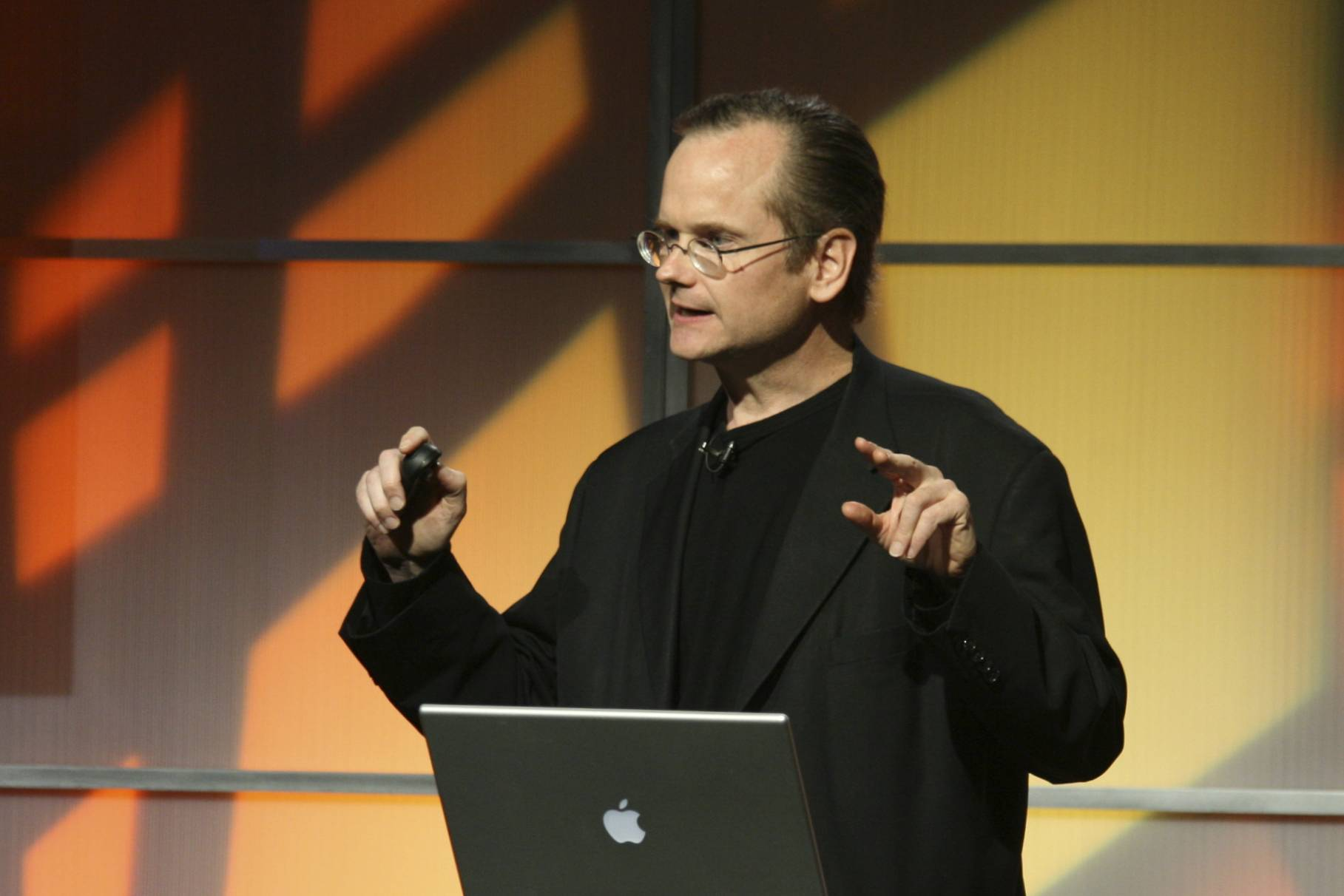
American legal scholar Lawrence Lessig

Harvard Law School professor Lawrence Lessig has argued that a movement to urge state legislatures to call for a Constitutional Convention was the best possibility to achieve substantive reform:

But somebody at the convention said that "what if Congress is the problem—what do we do then?" So they set up an alternative path ... that states can call on Congress to call a Convention. The convention, then, proposes the amendments, and those amendments have to pass by three-fourths of the states. So, either way, thirty-eight states have to ratify an amendment, but the sources of those amendments are different. One is inside, one is outside.

— Lawrence Lessig, 2011.

Lessig argued that the ordinary means of politics were not feasible to solve the problem affecting the United States government because the incentives corrupting politicians are so powerful. Lessig believes a convention is needed in view of Supreme Court decisions to eliminate most limits on campaign contributions. He quoted US Representative Jim Cooper from Tennessee who remarked that Congress had become a "Farm League for K Street" in the sense that those serving in Congress were focused on lucrative future careers as lobbyists, and not on serving the public interest. He proposed that such a convention be constrained by the decisions of state-based "citizen assemblies," assemblies composed of a random and representative selection of citizens, as a way to keep special interests out of the process.

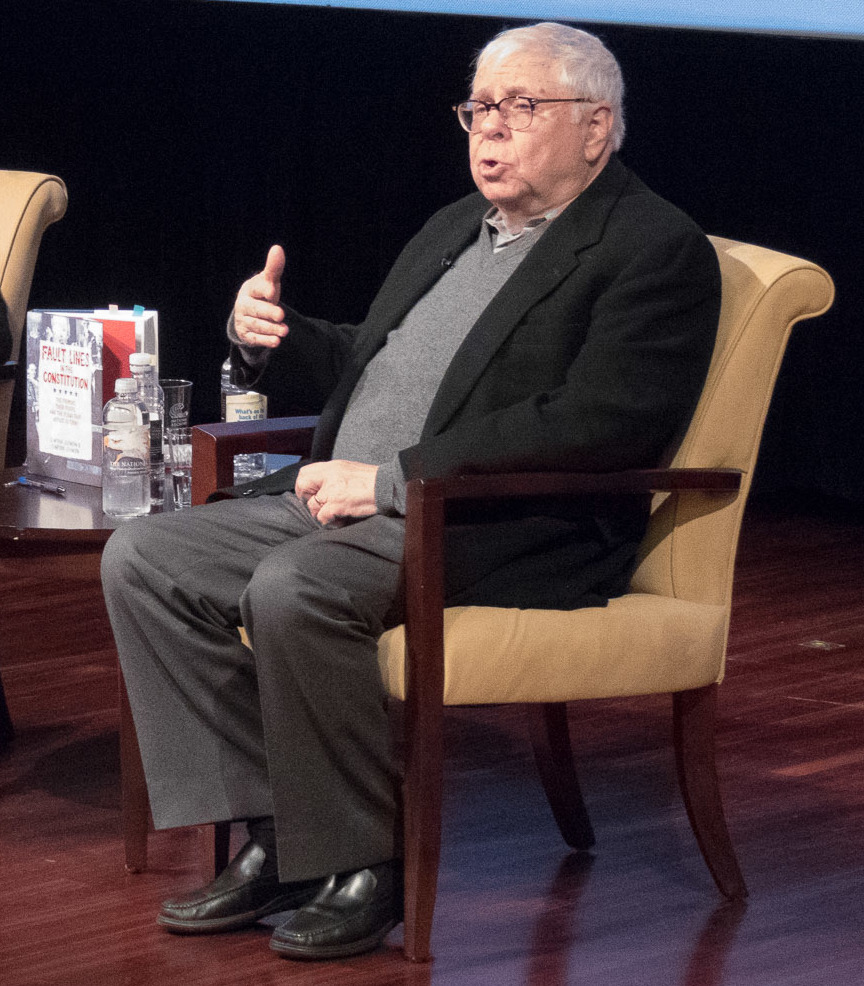
American legal scholar Sanford Levinson

Constitutional scholar and University of Texas Law School professor Sanford Levinson wrote Our Undemocratic Constitution: Where the Constitution Goes Wrong and called for a "wholesale revision of our nation's founding document." Levinson wrote:

We ought to think about it almost literally every day, and then ask, 'Well, to what extent is government organized to realize the noble visions of the preamble?' That the preamble begins, 'We the people.' It's a notion of a people that can engage in self-determination.

— Sanford Levinson, 2006

University of Tennessee law professor Glenn Reynolds, in a keynote speech at Harvard Law School, said the movement for a new convention was a reflection of having in many ways "the worst political class in our country's history."

Political scientist Larry Sabato believes a second convention is necessary since "piecemeal amendments" have not been working. Sabato argued that America needs a "grand meeting of clever and high-minded people to draw up a new, improved constitution better suited to the 21st century."

Author Scott Turow sees risks with a possible convention but believes it may be the only way to undo how campaign money has undermined the "one-man one-vote" premise.

Few new constitutions are modeled along the lines of the U.S. one, according to a study by David Law of Washington University in St. Louis. Supreme Court Justice Ruth Bader Ginsburg viewed the United States Constitution as more of a relic of the 18th century rather than as a model for new constitutions. She suggested in 2012 that a nation seeking a new constitution might find a better model by examining the Constitution of South Africa (1997), the Canadian Charter of Rights and Freedoms (1982) and the European Convention on Human Rights (1950).

I would not look to the United States Constitution if I were drafting a constitution in the year 2012.

— Ruth Bader Ginsburg, 2012

== See also ==
- A More Perfect Constitution, book by Larry Sabato
- The Liberty Amendments, book by Mark Levin
- Intergovernmental Conference
