= Richard Labunski =

- Born: United States
- Citizenship: United States
- Education: University of California, Berkeley (BA); University of California, Santa Barbara (MA, PhD); Seattle Law School (JD)
- Known for: The Second Constitutional; Convention (2000); James Madison and the Struggle for the Bill of Rights (2006)
- Scientific career
- Fields: Journalism, Law, Political Science
- Workplaces: University of Kentucky

Richard Labunski is an American journalism professor at the University of Kentucky and newspaper columnist who is an outspoken advocate for reforming the United States Constitution in his book The Second Constitutional Convention. He has been a critic of voter apathy, low voter turnout, and excessive campaign spending. Labunski's book James Madison and the Struggle for the Bill of Rights (2006) argued that Madison was initially lukewarm to the idea of a Bill of Rights to the Constitution, but later came to energetically support the ten amendments and worked hard for their inclusion. He has called for a Second Constitutional Convention of the United States, and argued that reform will not happen through the current system because Congress would be reluctant to "limit its own powers."

== Career ==
Labunski received a B.A. in political science from the University of California, Berkeley, an M.A. and Ph.D. in political science from the University of California, Santa Barbara, and a J.D. degree from Seattle University. He worked as a radio and television reporter, producer, and editor at WTOP Radio (Washington, D.C.); KCBS Radio (San Francisco); KGUN-TV (Tucson); and KTVN-TV (Reno). He taught at the University of Washington for 11 years, as well as at Penn State University. He has been at the University of Kentucky since 1995, as a professor in the School of Journalism and Telecommunications.

In The Second Constitutional Convention (2000), Labunski proposed communication via the Internet as a way for Americans to organize a federal constitutional convention with a website serving as a "national meeting spot, a sort of cyberspace town meeting where people can get information".

== Publications: Books ==
- James Madison and the Struggle for the Bill of Rights (Oxford University Press, 2006, 2008)
- The Second Constitutional Convention: How the American People Can Take Back Their Government (2000)
- The Educated Student: Getting the Most Out of Your College Years (2003)
- Libel and the First Amendment: Legal History and Practice in Print and Broadcasting (1989)
- The First Amendment Under Siege: The Politics of Broadcast Regulation (Greenwood Press, 1981)

== Publications: Journal Articles ==
- "The Second Convention Movement, 1787–1789," Constitutional Commentary (Fall 2007). (pp. 567–600).
- "The First Amendment at the Crossroads: Free Expression and New Media Technology," 2 Communication Law and Policy No. 2 Law Division, AEJMC (Spring, 1997). (published April, 1997). (pp. 165–212).
- "A First Amendment Exception to the 'Collateral Bar' Rule: Protecting Freedom of Expression and the Legitimacy of Courts," 22 Pepperdine Law Review No. 2 (Winter, 1995). (published May, 1995). (pp. 405–465).
- "Judicial Discretion and the First Amendment: Extending the Holding Beyond the Facts Through 'Contiguous Decision Making,'" 13 Comm/Ent - A Journal of Communications and Entertainment Law No. 1 Hastings College of the Law, University of California, San Francisco (Fall, 1990). (published January, 1991). (pp. 15–56).
- "The Evolution of Libel Laws: Complexity and Inconsistency," Book Research Quarterly (Winter, 1989). (published June, 1989). (pp. 59–95). (reprinted from Libel and the First Amendment).
- "May It Rest in Peace: Public Interest and Public Access in the Post-Fairness Doctrine Era," 11 Comm/Ent - A Journal of Communications and Entertainment Law No. 2 Hastings College of the Law, University of California, San Francisco (Winter, 1989). (published April, 1989). (pp. 219–290).
- "The 'Collateral Bar' Rule and the First Amendment: The Constitutionality of Enforcing Unconstitutional Orders," 37 American University Law Review No. 2 (Winter, 1988). (published March, 1988). (pp. 323–377).
- "Pennsylvania and Supreme Court Libel Decisions: The 'Libel Capital of the Nation' Tries to Comply," 25 Duquesne Law Review No. 1 (Fall, 1986). (published February, 1987). (pp. 87–128).
- "The Legal Environment of Investigative Reporters: A Pilot Study," Newspaper Research Journal (Spring, 1985). (pp. 13–19). (Co-author: John Pavlik).
