= National Service Act =

The National Service Act may refer to any one of a number of acts enforcing national service or conscription:

- in the United States
  - Universal National Service Act
  - National Service Act of 2006
- in Australia
  - National Service Act 1951
  - National Service Act 1964
- in the UK
  - National Service (Armed Forces) Act 1939
  - National Service Act 1948
