= National Service Act of 2006 =

Proposed United States legislation

Universal National Service Act of 2006
- Announced in: the 109th Congressth United States Congress

Legislative history
- Introduced in the House of Representatives as H.R. 4752 by Charles Rangel (D-NY) on February 14, 2006; Committee consideration by House Subcommittee on Military Personnel

Universal National Service Act of 2006, (H.R. 4752) sponsored by Rep. Charles Rangel (D-NY), was introduced into the U.S. House of Representatives on February 14, 2006. On February 23, 2006, it was referred to the House Subcommittee on Military Personnel. The bill was never enacted.

== Public debate ==
Rep. Rangel argued that the bill was necessary since in the case of a mandatory draft members of the U.S. Congress would be much less likely to authorize an unnecessary war if they knew that their own children and family members might be sent to fight it. He was quoted as saying: "There’s no question in my mind that this president and this administration would never have invaded Iraq, especially on the flimsy evidence that was presented to the Congress if indeed we had a draft and members of Congress and the administration thought that their kids from their communities would be placed in harm’s way". Rangel also argued that bringing back the draft would remedy the social disparity of the burden of military service falling disproportionately on the poor and the minorities. After the Democratic victories in the November 2007 congressional elections, Rangel repeated his call for re-introduction of the draft and for moving forward on the bill, and a more active public discussion of the proposal followed. Most of the reaction in the media, Congress and by the public was negative, although occasional support for the idea was expressed as well. The military leadership expressed opposition to the idea. Many conservative critics charged that the bill on re-introducing the draft was simply a political maneuver by Rangel aimed to underscore the unpopularity of the Iraq War. The debate was largely over soon after the incoming Democratic House Speaker Nancy Pelosi (D-CA) indicated that she was not interested in advancing the bill to reintroduce the draft.

== See also ==
- Universal National Service Act
