= Universal National Service Act =

Proposed United States legislation

- Long title: .
- Announced in: the [[108th, 109th, 110th, 111th, 113thth United States Congress]]

Legislative history
- Introduced in the House as H.R. 163 (2003); H.R. 4752 (2006); H.R. 393 (2007); H.R. 5741 (2010); H.R. 748 (2013) by Charles B. Rangel D‑NY on January 7, 2003 (Initial); Committee consideration by House Armed Services

The Universal National Service Act is the name of at least four bills proposed in the United States Congress (in 2003, 2006, 2007, 2010 and 2013), sponsored by Congressman Charles Rangel of New York, proposing mandatory national service for young adults, male or female. Other advocates for mandatory national service include Senator Chris Dodd, along with author Larry J. Sabato.

== Universal National Service Act of 2003 ==
The Universal National Service Act of 2003 (H.R. 163, S. 89) was a bill to resume the military draft in the United States, introduced in the 2003 session of the United States House of Representatives. The bill would have provided that, as early as June 2005, young men and women ages 18–26 could be called to service. Section 6 of the bill does not include college enrollment in the list of valid deferments and postponements of being drafted.

The measure was introduced by representative Charles Rangel, a leader in the Democratic Party and co-sponsored by five other Democrats. On October 5, 2004, Republicans called for a vote on the bill. The bill was considered under a motion to suspend the rules, which required a two-thirds vote for passage for the roll call vote to take place. The roll call vote on the bill was 2 in favor, 402 against. The only Members voting "aye" were Jack Murtha and Pete Stark.

Observers largely believe that Rangel, knowing beforehand that the bill would never be passed by the House, introduced it only to make a point. Rangel himself argued that the point of his bill was to express his opposition to the war in Iraq. In an editorial in The New York Times, Rangel said "if those calling for war knew that their children were likely to be required to serve—and to be placed in harm's way—there would be more caution and a greater willingness to work with the international community in dealing with Iraq." (See dailytexanonline.com and seattletimes.nwsource.com)

Some commentators opined that the bill figured in a "scare campaign" to convince US voters that Republicans (or specifically the White House) had secret plans to re-institute conscription after the November 2 elections. For example, John Sutherland, a columnist for The Guardian, claimed on May 31, 2004, that the bill is "currently approved and sitting in the Committee for Armed Services". He further predicted that the draft itself would be implemented as early as June 15, 2005. William Hawkins, a columnist for The Washington Times, denies that the bill was ever approved and claims that when Republicans brought it to the floor on October 5, it was for the express purpose of killing it.".

== Universal National Service Act of 2006 ==
The Universal National Service Act of 2006 (H.R. 4752) introduced February 14, 2006. New York Democratic Representative Charles Rangel again called for the draft to be reinstated. It required men and women 18–42 to perform a period of military service or a period of civilian service in furtherance of the national defense and homeland security, and for "other purposes". Speaker of the House Nancy Pelosi had rejected this proposal. It had no sponsors.

== Universal National Service Act of 2007 ==
The Universal National Service Act of 2007 (H.R. 393) is a bill introduced by Charles B. Rangel in the United States House of Representatives on January 10, 2007. It proposes the requirement that all residents in the United States aged between 18 and 42 carry out national service, and be available for conscription during wartime. It allows no deferments after age 20.

When the bill was introduced, it was referred to House Armed Services Committee and the House Committee on Ways and Means. On February 26, it was then referred to the Subcommittee on Military Personnel.

As of December 12, 2007, the bill had two co-sponsors. They are Rep. Yvette Clarke (D-NY) and Rep. James McDermott (D-WA).

Larry J. Sabato put forth a similar proposal in his 2007 book A More Perfect Constitution, with the primary difference being that Sabato's requirement would have been written into the Constitution instead of existing solely as a legislative mandate.

=== 2008 Presidential Campaign ===
This bill has become the subject of blogosphere speculation in the 2008 Presidential Race after Democratic candidates Hillary Clinton and Barack Obama both appeared to give some support for such legislation. During an MTV/MySpace forum on February 19, 2008, Hillary Clinton, when asked about education expenses, stated, "I'm in favor of two years of national service, where you could earn up to $10,000 a year doing national service and go right into helping you pay for college." In a follow-up comment, Barack Obama then stated, "one of the things that I've proposed, for example, is that I will give a $4000 tuition credit--every student, every year--so that they are not being loaded up with enormous debts, but there will be a community service--a national service component. The military could be one way for you to get this $4000 tuition credit. Another way would be to work in an under-served school that needs help. Another way would be to work in an under-served hospital or a homeless shelter, or a veterans home. The point is, I think it is important for young people to serve."

On July 2, 2008, in a speech at Colorado Springs, Barack Obama (as presumptive Democratic Party nominee) made another reference to such legislation when he called for the creation of a nationwide civilian service program, by explaining his vision of a national service program similar to the one he outlined in the MTV/MySpace forum, saying he would make federal assistance to schools contingent to school districts establishing service programs, with a goal of 50 h of service per year for middle school and high school students and 100 h of service per year for college students. He also expanded on his proposed program, calling for all ages to participate in an expansion of existing voluntary national service programs, and creation of new ones, in many areas, such as infrastructure rebuilding, service to the elderly, and environmental cleanup. Obama's entire service program proposal quickly became controversial, largely for being mistaken as a call for a national Gendarmerie force, though the proposal's only reference to military service was to volunteer participation in regular U.S. Armed Forces, as one activity that would qualify for inclusion under the program's umbrella.

On September 11, 2008, at Columbia University, Democratic Presidential nominee Barack Obama addressed this further, saying, "But it's also important that a president speaks to military service as an obligation not just of some, but of many. You know, I traveled, obviously, a lot over the last 19 months. And if you go to small towns, throughout the Midwest or the Southwest or the South, every town has tons of young people who are serving in Iraq and Afghanistan. That's not always the case in other parts of the country, in more urban centers. And I think it's important for the president to say, this is an important obligation. If we are going into war, then all of us go, not just some."

Obama never actually said he supported a draft or the specific bill that is currently stalled in Congress.

== Universal National Service Act of 2010 ==
The Universal National Service Act of 2010 (H.R. 5741) is a bill introduced by Charles B. Rangel in the United States House of Representatives on July 15, 2010. It again proposes the requirement that all residents - male and female - in the United States aged between 18 and 42 carry out national service for a period of two years, in the event of a war or national emergency, as declared by the president. It allows no deferments after age 20.

The bill, however, was dismissed at the end of the 111th Congress session.

== Universal National Service Act of 2013 ==
The Universal National Service Act of 2013 (H.R. 748) was introduced to the House Committee on Armed Services by Charles B. Rangel on February 15, 2013, demanding a 2-year mandatory national service period, civilian or military, for citizens between the ages of 18 and 25. The bill then moved to the House Subcommittee on Military Personnel on March 6, 2013, but later died in committee.

== H.R.1509 ==
On March 19, 2015, Rangel introduced legislation to activate Selective Service to draft men and women ages 18–25 via lottery during any authorization on the use of military force. The current text does not indicate whether, like Rangel's previous bills, it would compel citizens to perform National Service in peacetime.

== See also ==
- Conscription in the United States
