= List of rescissions of Article V Convention applications =

Article V of the United States Constitution provides that the legislatures of the several states may apply to Congress for a convention to propose amendments to the Constitution. Left unclear, however, is whether a state's legislature which has applied to Congress for such a convention may later change its sentiment and rescind such application.

If the purpose of Article V is to give state legislators power over a recalcitrant Congress—and if state lawmakers may indeed limit their applications by specific subject matter—it is possible that, if the question were ever put before them, federal courts would hold that a rescission of a previous application is likewise valid, in order to give more meaningful effect to the power which Article V confers upon state legislators.

== Recent activities ==
The legislatures of some states which, at various times, have made application to Congress for the calling of an Article V amendatory convention, have later rescinded such petitions. During the period between 1988 and 2026, it is known that lawmakers in 30 states adopted legislation to rescind previous legislative measures to apply for such a convention. Perhaps there were others in addition to the 30 which are confirmed and listed below. Remaining unclear from the language of Article V—and subject to debate—is whether an application, once made by a state legislature, may be subsequently revoked by that state's legislature.

From 2008 to 2026 in 13 of those very same 30 states, lawmakers changed their minds yet again—back in the direction of favoring that an Article V amendatory convention in fact be called.

== List of state legislative rescissions (1988–2025) ==
What follows is a listing of states whose legislatures are confirmed to have approved resolutions and memorials rescinding previous resolutions and memorials applying for an Article V amendatory convention. These known rescissions from 30 states have been officially received by at least one of the two houses of Congress and were, at a minimum, summarized in the Congressional Record and referred to the Committee on the Judiciary in either house of Congress. Again, the list below, covering 1988 to present, might not be all-inclusive:

- Alabama rescinding in 1988 (both House Joint Resolution No. 26 [POM-311, Volume 135 Congressional Record, page 20052 and POM-434, Volume 136 Congressional Record, page 4663] as well as House Joint Resolution No. 182 [POM-433, Volume 136 Congressional Record, page 4663]); but in 2011, Alabama legislators approved Senate Joint Resolution No. 100, reprising Alabama's application for a convention to propose a balanced budget amendment to the federal Constitution—thus going on record once again on that specific topic after Alabama's 1975 and 1976 applications for the same thing had been repealed by Alabama's two rescissions in 1988; and in 2015, Alabama lawmakers further applied for a convention relative to fiscal restraints on the federal government, limiting the power and jurisdiction of the federal government, and limiting the terms of office of federal officials—including members of Congress (House Joint Resolution No. 112); most recently, Alabama legislators adopted in 2018, House Joint Resolution No. 23 proposing a federal constitutional amendment that limits the number of terms of office a person may serve as a Member of the United States House of Representatives and as a Member of the United States Senate;
- Florida rescinding in 1988 (Senate Memorial No. 302) [POM-549, Volume 134 Congressional Record, page 15363]; but in 2010, Florida legislators approved Senate Concurrent Resolution No. 10, reprising Florida's application for a convention to propose a balanced budget amendment to the federal Constitution—thus going on record once again on that specific topic after Florida's 1976 application for the same thing had been repealed by Florida's 1988 rescission; four years later in 2014, Florida lawmakers again applied for a convention relative to an amendment requiring that the federal budget be balanced (Senate Memorial No. 658); not stopping there, 2014 Florida legislators also applied for a convention relative to amendments that would place fiscal restraints upon the federal government, limit the power and jurisdiction of the federal government, and limit the terms of office of federal officials—including members of Congress (Senate Memorial No. 476); as well as applying, likewise in 2014, for a convention for an amendment to require that legislation in Congress contain only one subject and that the one subject must be clearly expressed in the measure's title (House Memorial No. 261); and in 2016, Florida lawmakers further applied for a convention relative to term limits on Members of Congress (House Memorial No. 417);
- Nevada Assembly members attempted a structurally-flawed, one-house rescission in 1989 with their adoption of Assembly Resolution No. 20 ("FILE NUMBER 157") [POM-181, Volume 135 Congressional Record, page 14573] issuing the unusual instruction to the Nevada Assembly's Chief Clerk to "...draw a black border around the portion of the 1979 Assembly Journal whereby the Assembly passed Senate Joint Resolution No. 8 and write across the face thereof: 'Expunged by order of the Assembly this 24th day of June, 1989...'"; but, in 2017, Nevada lawmakers succeeded in a proper, two-house, umbrella-style rescission with their adoption of Senate Joint Resolution No. 10 (see below);
- Louisiana rescinding in 1990 (House Concurrent Resolution No. 218) [POM-288, Volume 138 Congressional Record, page 669]; but in 2008, Louisiana lawmakers again applied for a convention—to place into the Constitution the statutory Posse Comitatus Act originally enacted by Congress in 1878 (House Concurrent Resolution No. 38); and a separate entreat three years later, in 2011, for a convention relative to an amendment requiring that a majority of state legislatures approve any increase in the federal government's debt (House Concurrent Resolution No. 87); and three years after that, in 2014, Louisiana legislators approved House Concurrent Resolution No. 70, reprising Louisiana's plural applications for a convention to propose a balanced budget amendment to the federal Constitution—thus going on record once again on that specific topic after Louisiana's plural applications during the 1970s for the same thing had been among the casualties of Louisiana's umbrella-rescission in 1990; most recently, in 2016, the Louisiana Legislature applied for a convention "...for the purpose of proposing amendments to limit the power and jurisdiction of the federal government, impose fiscal restraints upon its activities, and limit the terms of office that may be served by its officials and by members of Congress" (Senate Concurrent Resolution No. 52);
- Idaho rescinding in 1999 (Senate Concurrent Resolution No. 129) [POM-410, Volume 146 Congressional Record, pages 1449–1450];
- Oregon rescinding in 1999 (Senate Joint Memorial No. 9) [POM-393, Volume 146 Congressional Record, page 95];
- North Dakota rescinding in 2001 (Senate Concurrent Resolution No. 4028) [POM-8, Volume 147 Congressional Record, page 5905]; but a decade later, in 2011, North Dakota lawmakers submitted to Congress two applications—one asking for a convention relative to an amendment requiring that a majority of the state legislatures approve any increase in the federal government's debt (Senate Concurrent Resolution No. 4007); and a separate request for a convention relative to an amendment which would negate concerns about a "runaway" Article V Convention (House Concurrent Resolution No. 3048); in 2013, during North Dakota's 63rd Legislative Assembly, Senate Concurrent Resolution No. 4016 was offered ("A concurrent resolution to rescind an application made by the Sixty‑second Legislative Assembly to the Congress of the United States to call a convention pursuant to the terms of Article V of the United States Constitution for proposing an amendment to the Constitution") which—had it passed—would have rescinded the aforementioned House Concurrent Resolution No. 3048 from 2011; on February 27, 2013, S.C.R. No. 4016 "was declared lost" on a voice vote; and in 2015, North Dakota legislators approved House Concurrent Resolution No. 3015, reprising North Dakota's application for a convention to propose a balanced budget amendment to the federal Constitution—thus going on record once again on that specific topic after North Dakota's 1975 application for the same thing had been among the casualties of North Dakota's umbrella-rescission in 2001; and in 2017, North Dakota lawmakers approved House Concurrent Resolution No. 3006, applying for a convention for an amendment that would place fiscal restraints upon the federal government, limit the power and jurisdiction of the federal government, and limit the terms of office of federal officials, including members of Congress;
- Utah rescinding in 2001 (House Joint Resolution No. 15) [POM-197, Volume 147 Congressional Record, page 19025]; but in 2015, Utah lawmakers approved House Joint Resolution No. 7, reprising Utah's application for a convention to propose a balanced budget amendment to the federal Constitution—thus going on record once again on that specific topic after Utah's 1979 application for the same thing had been among the casualties of Utah's umbrella-rescission in 2001; and in 2019, Utah lawmakers approved Senate Joint Resolution No. 9, again applying for a convention relative to fiscal restraints on the federal government, limiting the power and jurisdiction of the federal government, and limiting the terms of office of federal officials, including members of Congress;
- Arizona rescinding in 2003 (Senate Concurrent Resolution No. 1022) [POM-125, Volume 149 Congressional Record, page 12844]; but in 2017, Arizona legislators approved House Concurrent Resolution No. 2013, reprising Arizona's application for a convention to propose a balanced budget amendment to the federal Constitution—thus going on record once again on that specific topic after Arizona's 1977 application for the same thing had been among the casualties of Arizona's umbrella-rescission in 2003; and, likewise in 2017, Arizona lawmakers further applied for a convention relative to an amendment placing fiscal restraints on the federal government, limiting the power and jurisdiction of the federal government, and limiting the terms of office of federal officials—including members of Congress (House Concurrent Resolution No. 2010);
- Georgia rescinding in 2004 (House Resolution No. 1343) [Memorial 349, Volume 150 Congressional Record, page 11124]; but in 2014, Georgia legislators approved Senate Resolution No. 371, reprising Georgia's application for a convention to propose a balanced budget amendment to the federal Constitution—thus going on record once again on that specific topic after Georgia's 1976 application for the same thing had been among the casualties of Georgia's umbrella-rescission in 2004; and, likewise in 2014, Georgia lawmakers further applied for a convention to propose amendments that would impose fiscal restraints on the federal government, limit the power and jurisdiction of the federal government, and limit the terms of office for federal officials—including members of Congress (Senate Resolution No. 736);
- South Carolina rescinding in 2004 ("H. 3400") [POM-187, Volume 160 Congressional Record, page S367, soft-cover preliminary edition] Note: It took nearly a full decade for South Carolina's 2004 rescission to officially find its way onto the pages of the Congressional Record, together with referral to committee in each body; in 2022, South Carolina lawmakers approved "H. 3205" applying for a convention relative to fiscal restraints on the federal government, limiting the power and jurisdiction of the federal government, and limiting the terms of office of federal officials, including members of Congress;
- Virginia rescinding in 2004 (House Joint Resolution No. 194) [POM-218, Volume 160 Congressional Record, page S2238, soft-cover preliminary edition] Note: It took a full decade for Virginia's 2004 rescission to officially find its verbatim text on the pages of the Congressional Record, together with referral to the Judiciary Committee in the United States Senate;
- Montana rescinding in 2007 (House Joint Resolution No. 38) [POM-146, Volume 153 Congressional Record, page 17881];
- Oklahoma rescinding in 2009 (Senate Joint Resolution No. 11) [POM-253, Volume 160 Congressional Record, page S3667, soft-cover preliminary edition] Note: It took five years for Oklahoma's 2009 rescission to officially find its verbatim text on the pages of the Congressional Record, together with referral to the Judiciary Committee in the United States Senate; furthermore, in 2016, Oklahoma lawmakers again applied for a convention relative to a combination of: (1) Balanced Budget Amendment; and (2) Fiscal restraints on the federal government, limiting the power and jurisdiction of the federal government, and limiting the terms of office of federal officials, including members of Congress (Senate Joint Resolution No. 4); thus, Oklahoma lawmakers went on record once again on the topic of a balanced budget amendment after Oklahoma's 1976 application for a balanced budget amendment had been among the casualties of Oklahoma's umbrella-rescission in 2009;
- Wyoming rescinding in 2009 (Enrolled Joint Resolution No. 3, previously designated as House Joint Resolution No. 0007) [Memorial 33, Volume 155 Congressional Record, page 10426]; but in 2017, Wyoming lawmakers approved House Enrolled Joint Resolution No. 2, reprising Wyoming's application for a convention to propose a balanced budget amendment to the federal Constitution—thus going on record once again on that specific topic after Wyoming's 1977 application for the same thing had been among the casualties of Wyoming's umbrella-rescission in 2009;
- New Hampshire rescinding in 2010 (House Concurrent Resolution No. 28) [Memorial 357, Volume 156 Congressional Record, page 14480]; but in 2012, New Hampshire lawmakers approved House Concurrent Resolution No. 40, reprising New Hampshire's application for a convention to propose a balanced budget amendment to the federal Constitution—thus going on record once again on that specific topic after New Hampshire's 1979 application for the same thing had been among the casualties of New Hampshire's umbrella-rescission in 2010;
- South Dakota rescinding in 2010 (House Bill No. 1135) [POM-252, Volume 160 Congressional Record, page S3667, soft-cover preliminary edition] Note: It took four years for South Dakota's 2010 rescission to officially find its verbatim text on the pages of the Congressional Record, together with referral to the Judiciary Committee in the United States Senate; furthermore, in 2015, South Dakota lawmakers approved House Joint Resolution No. 1001, reprising South Dakota's application for a convention to propose a balanced budget amendment to the federal Constitution—thus going on record once again on that specific topic after South Dakota's 1979 application for the same thing had been among the casualties of South Dakota's umbrella-rescission in 2010;
- Tennessee rescinding in 2010 (House Joint Resolution No. 30) [Memorial 405 and Memorial 406, Volume 156 Congressional Record, page 19370]; but, in 2014, Tennessee legislators approved House Joint Resolution No. 548, reprising Tennessee's application for a convention to propose a balanced budget amendment to the federal Constitution—thus going on record once again on that specific topic after Tennessee's 1977 application for the same thing had been among the casualties of Tennessee's 2010 umbrella-rescission; and in 2016, Tennessee lawmakers further applied for a convention relative to fiscal restraints on the federal government, limiting the power and jurisdiction of the federal government, and limiting the terms of office of federal officials, including members of Congress (Senate Joint Resolution No. 67);
- Delaware rescinding in 2016 (House Concurrent Resolution No. 60) [POM-200, Volume 162 Congressional Record, page S5277, soft-cover preliminary edition];
- Maryland rescinding in 2017 (both House Joint Resolution No. 2 and Senate Joint Resolution No. 2) [POM-102 as well as POM-103, Volume 163 Congressional Record, pages S5112 and S5113, soft-cover preliminary edition];
- Nevada rescinding in 2017 (Senate Joint Resolution No. 10—"FILE NUMBER 22") [POM-64, Volume 163 Congressional Record, pages S4055-S4056, soft-cover preliminary edition];
- New Mexico rescinding in 2017 (House Joint Resolution No. 10) [POM-96, POM-99 and POM-100, Volume 163 Congressional Record, pages S5110, S5111 and S5112, soft-cover preliminary edition];
- Texas rescinding in 2017 (Senate Joint Resolution No. 38) all Article V Convention applications adopted prior to the year 2017—with the singular exception of that convention application approved by Texas lawmakers during the year 1977 on the topic of a federal Balanced Budget Amendment [POM-130, Volume 163 Congressional Record, pages S6847-S6848, soft-cover preliminary edition and POM-131, Volume 163 Congressional Record, pages S6922-S6923, soft-cover preliminary edition]; and
- South Dakota rescinding in 2019 (House Joint Resolution No. 1004) three prior Article V Convention applications (from years 1907, 1909 and 1971) which were overlooked in South Dakota's 2010 umbrella rescission (House Bill No. 1135), referenced above [2019 H.J.R. No. 1004 was designated as POM-45, Volume 165 Congressional Record, page S2610, soft-cover preliminary edition and as POM-56, Volume 165 Congressional Record, page S2813, soft-cover preliminary edition];
- Colorado rescinding in 2021 (House Joint Resolution No. 21-1006) [POM-17, Volume 167 Congressional Record, page S4517, soft-cover preliminary edition];
- New Jersey rescinding in 2021 (Senate Concurrent Resolution No. 161) [POM-108, Volume 168 Congressional Record, page S495, soft-cover preliminary edition];
- Illinois rescinding in 2022 (Senate Joint Resolution No. 54) [POM-244, Volume 168 Congressional Record, page S6694, soft-cover preliminary edition];
- Oregon rescinding in 2023 (House Bill No. 3625 and House Joint Memorial No. 3) taking a non-traditional approach of rescinding prior Article V Convention applications from Oregon lawmakers both in the form of a State law as well as in the form of a memorial or resolution to Congress. Due to poor wording within House Joint Memorial No. 3, it has only been received by the U.S. House of Representatives and not at all by the U.S. Senate. [Memorial "ML-63" in Volume 169 of the Congressional Record at page H4463, soft-cover preliminary edition];
- New York rescinding in 2024 (Senate [Concurrent] Resolution No. 1460) [POM-177, Volume 170 Congressional Record, page S6434, soft-cover preliminary edition];
- California an umbrella rescission in 2025 (Senate Joint Resolution No. 1);
- Connecticut rescinding in 2025 ("Resolution Act No. 25-1", previously known as "House Joint Resolution No. 49", [POM-27, Volume 172 Congressional Record, page S160, soft-cover preliminary edition];
- Massachusetts rescinding in 2025 (both House Resolution No. 4692 and Senate Resolution No. 2684) [POM-30, Volume 172, Congressional Record, page S161, soft-cover preliminary edition]; and
- Washington rescinding in 2025 (Senate Joint Memorial No. 8008) [POM-65, Volume 172, Congressional Record, pages S4857-4858, soft-cover preliminary edition].

== Unsuccessful efforts to rescind prior Article V Convention applications (2009–2017) ==
From 2011 to 2017, unsuccessful measures to rescind previous convention calls were known to have been introduced in 10 states as follows:

=== 2009 ===
- Arkansas - House Concurrent Resolution No. 1022 ("to rescind the previous application by the General Assembly to the Congress of the United States that it call a Constitutional Convention to Propose an Amendment to the Constitution to balance the public debt") which went down to defeat in the Arkansas House of Representatives on April 3, 2009, with a record vote of 35 yeas, 52 nays and 13 not voting.

=== 2011 ===
- Kansas – Senate Concurrent Resolution No. 1601 ("rescinding the action of the legislature of the state of Kansas petitioning congress to call a convention for the purpose of proposing amendments to the constitution of the United States");
- Massachusetts – Senate No. 00788 ("An Act to rescind all previous calls for a federal constitutional convention");
- North Carolina – House Joint Resolution No. 935 ("to repeal past joint resolutions of the North Carolina General Assembly calling for a federal constitutional convention because of concerns that such a constitutional convention could not be limited"); and
- Texas – House Joint Resolution No. 123 ("rescinding the 1899 application of the 26th Texas Legislature to the United States Congress to call an unrestricted convention under Article V of the United States Constitution").

=== 2012 ===
- Missouri – Senate Concurrent Resolution No. 18 ("...the Missouri General Assembly hereby repeals, rescinds, cancels, renders null and void and supersedes any and all existing applications to the Congress of the United States for a constitutional convention under Article V of the Constitution of the United States for any purpose, whether limited or general"); and
- New Jersey – Assembly Concurrent Resolution No. 46 ("rescinding all applications previously transmitted by the New Jersey Legislature to the Congress of the United States calling for a convention for the purpose of proposing amendments to the Constitution of the United States").

=== 2013 ===
- Missouri – House Concurrent Resolution No. 23 ("Proposes to rescind Missouri's call for a constitutional convention for the purposes of adopting a balanced budget amendment");
- North Carolina – House Joint Resolution No. 374 ["A Joint Resolution (I) rescinding all extant applications by the General Assembly heretofore made during any session thereof to the Congress of the United States of America to call a convention pursuant to the terms of Article V of the United States Constitution for proposing one or more amendments to that Constitution, (II) urging the Legislatures of other states to do the same, and (III) directing that copies of this resolution be sent to specified persons"] which was unanimously approved by the North Carolina House of Representatives on May 13, 2013, only to die in the Committee on Rules and Operations of the North Carolina Senate;
- North Dakota – Senate Concurrent Resolution No. 4016 ("A concurrent resolution to rescind an application made by the Sixty-second Legislative Assembly to the Congress of the United States to call a convention pursuant to the terms of Article V of the United States Constitution for proposing an amendment to the Constitution") which, on February 27, 2013, was "declared lost on a voice vote" in the North Dakota Senate; and
- Texas – House Joint Resolution No. 101 ("Rescinding the application of the 26th Texas Legislature made in the year 1899 to the United States Congress to call an unrestricted national convention, pursuant to Article V of the United States Constitution, for proposing undisclosed amendments to that Constitution"); as well as Senate Joint Resolution No. 53 ("Rescinding every application made at any time by the Legislature of the State of Texas to the United States Congress to call a national convention, pursuant to Article V of the United States Constitution, for proposing any amendment or amendments to that Constitution").

=== 2014 ===
- New Jersey – Assembly Concurrent Resolution No. 17 ("rescinds all applications previously transmitted by the New Jersey Legislature to Congress calling for constitutional convention"); and Senate Concurrent Resolution No. 107 likewise ("rescinds all applications previously transmitted by the New Jersey Legislature to Congress calling for constitutional convention").

=== 2015 ===
- Florida – House Memorial No. 1129 ("A memorial to the Congress of the United States, urging Congress to repeal and nullify all existing applications by the Florida Legislature that call for a constitutional convention");
- New Hampshire – House Concurrent Resolution No. 1 ("Rescinding all requests by the New Hampshire legislature for a federal constitutional convention");
- North Carolina – House Joint Resolution No. 132 ["A Joint Resolution (I) rescinding all extant applications by the General Assembly heretofore made during any session thereof to the Congress of the United States of America to call a convention pursuant to the terms of Article V of the United States Constitution for proposing one or more amendments to that Constitution (II) urging the legislatures of other states to do the same, and (III) directing that copies of this resolution be sent to specified persons"] as well as Senate Bill No. 528 ("an Act rescinding all extant applications by the General Assembly heretofore made during any session thereof to the Congress of the United States of America to call a convention pursuant to the terms of Article V of the United States Constitution for proposing one or more amendments to that Constitution and directing that copies of this Act be sent to specified persons"); and
- Texas – House Joint Resolution No. 144 ("rescinding the 1899 application of the 26th Texas Legislature to the United States Congress to call an unrestricted national convention under Article V of the United States Constitution for proposing undisclosed amendments to that Constitution").

=== 2017 ===
- Vermont - Joint Resolution Senate No. 17 ("rescinding the [Vermont] General Assembly’s request, contained in 2014 Acts and Resolves No. R-454, for Congress to convene a U.S. Constitutional Convention [to reverse the U.S. Supreme Court's 2010 decision in the case of Citizens United v. Federal Elections Commission]"). The Vermont Senate adopted "J.R.S. 17" on April 6, 2017; it was then referred to the Committee on Government Operations in the Vermont House of Representatives.

== Incomplete state legislative actions in favor of calling an Article V Convention (2010–2020) ==
=== 2010 ===
During the 2010 state legislative season, there was at least one state in which it is known that Article V amendatory convention applications were approved by one chamber of that state's bicameral legislature. On June 9, 2010, the Louisiana House of Representatives approved ten concurrent resolutions requesting that Congress call separate Article V conventions on various subject matters. Aside from referring all ten of them to its Finance Committee—where they all died—the Louisiana Senate did not take further action on these concurrent resolutions:

- House Concurrent Resolution No. 57 ("Applies to congress to call a convention pursuant to Article V of the U.S. Constitution to propose an amendment regarding a presidential line item veto for appropriation bills");
- House Concurrent Resolution No. 59 ("Applies to congress to call a convention pursuant to Article V of the U.S. Constitution to propose an amendment regarding a requirement that bills be confined to a single object and a prohibition on amendments that are not germane to the bill as introduced");
- House Concurrent Resolution No. 62 ("Applies to congress to call a convention pursuant to Article V of the U.S. Constitution to propose an amendment regarding a requirement for a supermajority vote to levy a new tax, increase an existing tax, or repeal an existing tax exemption");
- House Concurrent Resolution No. 63 ("Applies to congress to call a convention pursuant to Article V of the U.S. Constitution to propose an amendment regarding term limits for members of congress");
- House Concurrent Resolution No. 64 ("Applies to congress to call a convention pursuant to Article V of the U.S. Constitution to propose an amendment regarding a limitation on the authority of congress to pass legislation pursuant to the general welfare clause in Article I, Section 8 of the U.S. Constitution");
- House Concurrent Resolution No. 65 ("Applies to congress to call a convention pursuant to Article V of the U.S. Constitution to propose an amendment regarding a requirement to reduce the federal debt through annual appropriations");
- House Concurrent Resolution No. 66 ("Applies to congress to call a convention pursuant to Article V of the U.S. Constitution to propose an amendment regarding an overall spending limitation on the federal budget");
- House Concurrent Resolution No. 67 ("Applies to congress to call a convention pursuant to Article V of the U.S. Constitution to propose an amendment regarding a limitation on the authority of congress to pass legislation pursuant to the necessary and proper clause in Article I, Section 8 of the U.S. Constitution");
- House Concurrent Resolution No. 68 ("Applies to congress to call a convention pursuant to Article V of the U.S. Constitution to propose a balanced budget amendment") (refer, however, to House Concurrent Resolution No. 70, which was adopted by both chambers of the Louisiana Legislature, during its 2014 session, and which accomplishes basically the same thing); and
- House Concurrent Resolution No. 69 ("Applies to congress to call a convention pursuant to Article V of the U.S. Constitution to propose an amendment regarding a limitation on the authority of congress to pass legislation pursuant to the commerce clause in Article I, Section 8 of the U.S. Constitution").

=== 2011 ===
During the 2011 state legislative season, there were at least five states in which it is known that Article V amendatory convention applications were approved by one chamber of bicameral legislatures. While there may be other examples, the known five are:

- Florida whose Senate on April 28, 2011, approved Senate Concurrent Resolution No. 4 ("urging Congress to call a convention for the purpose of proposing amendments to the Constitution of the United States to achieve and maintain a balanced federal budget"); the concurrent resolution then died in the Florida House of Representatives; but during the previous year of 2010, Florida lawmakers had already approved Senate Concurrent Resolution No. 10 doing virtually the same thing as 2011's S.C.R. No. 4;
- Kentucky whose Senate on February 22, 2011, approved Senate Concurrent Resolution No. 134 ("urge Congress to call an Article V Convention for the purpose of proposing an amendment to the Constitution of the United States requiring a balanced federal budget"); the concurrent resolution then died in the Committee on Elections, Constitutional Amendments, and Intergovernmental Affairs of the Kentucky House of Representatives;
- South Carolina whose House of Representatives on February 3, 2011, approved a Joint Resolution designated as "H. 3074" ("to request appropriate action by the Congress of the United States, on its own action by consent of two-thirds of both houses or on the application of the legislatures of two-thirds of the several states, to propose an amendment to the Constitution of the United States to require that the total of all federal appropriations may not exceed the total of all estimated federal revenues in any fiscal year, with certain exceptions"); this joint resolution then died in the Judiciary Committee of the South Carolina Senate. On February 16, 2011, South Carolina's House of Representatives likewise approved a Concurrent Resolution designated as "H. 3507" ("to make application to the Congress of the United States to call a constitutional convention pursuant to Article V of the United States Constitution for the purpose of proposing a constitutional amendment that permits the repeal of any federal law or regulation by vote of two-thirds of the state legislatures"); this concurrent resolution likewise died in the Judiciary Committee of the South Carolina Senate;
- Texas whose Senate on February 23, 2011, approved Senate Joint Resolution No. 1 ("urging the Congress of the United States to propose and submit to the states for ratification a federal balanced budget amendment to the Constitution of the United States and, in the event that Congress does not submit such an amendment on or before December 31, 2011, applying to Congress to call a convention for the specific and exclusive purpose of proposing an amendment to that constitution to provide, in the absence of a national emergency and on a two-thirds vote of Congress, for a federal balanced budget and requesting that the legislatures of each of the several states that compose [sic] the United States apply to Congress to call a convention to propose such an amendment"); the joint resolution then died in the Select Committee on State Sovereignty of the Texas House of Representatives; but during their 1977 Regular Session, Texas lawmakers had already approved House Concurrent Resolution No. 31 doing virtually the same thing as 2011's S.J.R. No. 1; and
- Virginia whose House of Delegates on January 25, 2011, approved House Joint Resolution No. 542 ("making application to the Congress of the United States to call an amendment convention pursuant to Article V of the United States Constitution for the purpose of proposing a constitutional amendment that permits the repeal of any federal law or regulation by vote of two-thirds of the state legislatures"); H.J.R. No. 542 then died in the Committee on Privileges and Elections of the Virginia Senate. On February 23, 2011, Virginia's House of Delegates likewise approved House Joint Resolution No. 852 ("memorializing the Congress of the United States to adopt legislation requiring a balanced federal budget and to call a convention for the purpose of amending the Constitution to provide a balanced budget requirement") and H.J.R. No. 852 then died in the Committee on Rules of the Virginia Senate.

=== 2012 ===
During the 2012 state legislative season, it is known that in five states Article V amendatory convention applications were approved by one chamber of a bicameral legislature. While it is possible that there were others, the five known examples are:

- Arizona whose Senate on February 27, 2012, approved Senate Concurrent Resolution No. 1005 ("applying to the Congress of the United States to call a convention for proposing an amendment to the Constitution of the United States to provide that an increase in the Federal debt requires approval from a majority of the legislatures of the separate states"); the concurrent resolution then died in the Committee on Appropriations of the Arizona House of Representatives;
- Georgia whose Senate on March 7, 2012, approved Senate Resolution No. 673 ("making renewed application to the Congress of the United States to call for a convention for the purpose of proposing an amendment to the Constitution of the United States; and for other purposes"); the resolution then died in the Committee on Governmental Affairs of the Georgia House of Representatives (refer, however, to Senate Resolution No. 371, which was adopted by both chambers of the Georgia General Assembly, during its 2014 session, which accomplishes basically the same thing);
- Hawaii whose House of Representatives on April 5, 2012, approved House Concurrent Resolution No. 114 ("Applying to Congress to call a National Constitutional Convention pursuant to Article V of the United States Constitution"); the concurrent resolution then died in the Committee on Public Safety, Government Operations, and Military Affairs as well as in the Committee on Judiciary and Labor of the Hawaii Senate; had it also been approved by the Hawaii Senate, H.C.R. No. 114 would have constituted the very first time in the entire history of Hawaii statehood that Hawaii would have made application for an Article V convention; as approved by the Hawaii House of Representatives, H.C.R. No. 114 contained four suggested distinct amendments to the Federal Constitution for Article V amendatory convention delegates to consider: (1) "A declaration of the constitutionality of the federal Patient Protection and Affordable Care Act, including the individual mandate requiring the purchase of health insurance"; (2) "An amendment to Article I, Section 5, to prohibit the supermajority cloture requirement under Rule 22 of the United States Senate for ending floor debates and filibusters, to facilitate a more reasonable voting standard for cloture"; (3) "An amendment abolishing the electoral college established under Article II, Section 1, and providing for the direct election of the United States President and Vice President by voters"; and (4) "An amendment to Article II, Section 2, Clause 2, to require that Senate confirmations of appointments of officers of the United States be made by a simple majority vote within sixty days of the nomination";
- New Hampshire whose Senate on February 8, 2012, approved Senate Concurrent Resolution No. 1 ("urging Congress to call a convention for the sole purpose of proposing an amendment to the Constitution of the United States"); S.C.R. No. 1 was relative to altering the present means of proposing amendments to the Federal Constitution; this concurrent resolution then died in the Committee on State-Federal Relations and Veterans Affairs of the New Hampshire House of Representatives; and
- Oklahoma whose Senate on March 12, 2012, approved Senate Bill No. 1903 ("An Act relating to the United States Constitution; stating legislative findings; setting forth application for amendments convention for specific purpose; limiting convention to proposal for amendment to United States Constitution to require state legislative approval for increase in federal debt; providing that application continue for certain period; and directing distribution by Secretary of State"); the bill then died in the Judiciary Committee of the Oklahoma House of Representatives.

Likewise during the 2012 state legislative season, there was one state in which an alleged Article V Convention so-called "application" was approved by only one chamber of a bicameral legislature. That was:

- Colorado whose House of Representatives on January 19, 2012, approved House Resolution No. 12-1003 ("concerning an Application under Article V of the United States Constitution to the Congress of the United States to call a Convention for Proposing an Amendment to the United States Constitution to Repeal the 'Patient Protection and Affordable Care Act'." [Congressional Public Law No. 111-148]). Colorado's H.R. No. 12-1003, upon closer inspection, is structurally flawed inasmuch as that resolution resolves only that the "...House of Representatives of the Sixty-eighth General Assembly..." applies for an Article V Convention. Validity as an actual Article V application requires that both chambers of the bicameral Colorado General Assembly so resolve. On its face a strictly unicameral instrument, H.R. No. 12-1003 was never even transmitted to the Colorado Senate for that body's consideration. On July 18, 2012, the Colorado House of Representatives' H.R. No. 12-1003 was officially received by the United States House of Representatives, was designated by the U.S. House as Memorial No. 252, and was referred to the Committee on the Judiciary in that body (See 158 Congressional Record, page H5009, soft-cover preliminary edition).

=== 2013 ===
During the 2013 state legislative season, Article V amendatory convention applications received the approval of one chamber of bicameral state legislatures. While it is possible that there were others, the three known examples are:

- Indiana whose Senate on February 26, 2013, approved Senate Joint Resolution No. 18 ("requesting Congress to call a constitutional convention for the purpose of proposing amendments to the Constitution of the United States concerning limitation of the commerce and taxing powers of Congress"); the joint resolution was then referred to the Committee on the Judiciary of the Indiana House of Representatives and died in that Committee;
- Minnesota whose Senate on May 2, 2013, approved Senate File No. 17 ("resolution requesting Congress to propose a constitutional amendment and, if Congress does not propose an amendment, applying to Congress to call a constitutional convention to propose an amendment clarifying the rights protected under the Constitution are the rights of natural persons and not the rights of artificial entities and that spending money to influence elections is not speech under the First Amendment"); the resolution was then transmitted to the Minnesota House of Representatives where, supposedly, it was to be placed on the House's Calendar for May 10, 2013; but nothing happened; on March 4, 2014, S.F. No. 17 was reported from committee back to the full Minnesota House of Representatives and briefly occupied the status of "second reading"; S.F. No. 17 was then placed on the House's calendar for April 30, 2014, but, again, nothing happened; it was then placed on the House's calendar for May 15, 2014—again, nothing happened—and S.F. No. 17 was then "returned to General Register" with no further progress having occurred; and
- South Carolina whose House of Representatives on April 17, 2013, approved "H. 3862" ("To make Application by the State of South Carolina under Article V of the United States Constitution for a Balanced Budget Amendment Convention of the several States of the United States"); the concurrent resolution was then referred to the Committee on Finance in the South Carolina Senate with no further progress having occurred.

=== 2014 ===
During the 2014 state legislative season, Article V Convention applications received the approval of one chamber of bicameral state legislatures. While it is possible that there were others, the seven known examples are:

- Alabama whose House of Representatives on February 13, 2014, approved House Joint Resolution No. 49 ("Making Application for a Convention of the States under Article V of the United States Constitution to propose certain amendments relating to the Federal Government"); H.J.R. No. 49, which pertains to "...proposing amendments that impose fiscal restraints on the federal government, limit the power and jurisdiction of the federal government, and limit the terms of office for its officials", was referred to the Rules Committee in the Alabama Senate where it died; (refer, however, to House Joint Resolution No. 112, which was approved by both chambers of the Alabama Legislature, during its 2015 session, and which accomplishes basically the same thing); and whose House of Representatives on April 2, 2014, likewise approved House Joint Resolution No. 192 ("Urging Congress to call a Convention for the purpose of proposing an Amendment to the Constitution of the United States"); H.J.R. No. 192, relative to defining marriage as a union of one man and one woman, likewise died in the Alabama Senate's Committee on Rules;
- Arizona whose House of Representatives on February 25, 2014, approved House Concurrent Resolution No. 2017 ("Applying to the Congress of the United States to call a convention for proposing an Amendment to the Constitution of the United States to require that the Congress adopt a Balanced Federal Budget"); H.C.R. No. 2017 then died in the Committee on Government and Environment, in the Committee on the Judiciary, and in the Committee on Rules of the Arizona Senate (refer, however, to House Concurrent Resolution No. 2013, which was adopted by both chambers of the Arizona Legislature, during its 2017 session, and which accomplishes basically the same thing); and whose House of Representatives on March 12, 2014, likewise approved House Concurrent Resolution No. 2027 ("Applying to the Congress of the United States to call a convention for proposing amendments to the Constitution of the United States") which called for a federal constitutional amendment to impose fiscal restraints on the federal government, limit the power and jurisdiction of the federal government, and limit the terms of office for officials of the federal government; H.C.R. No. 2027 likewise died in the same three committees of the Arizona Senate (refer, however, to House Concurrent Resolution No. 2010, which was adopted by both chambers of the Arizona Legislature, during its 2017 session, and which accomplishes basically the same thing);
- Florida whose House of Representatives on March 26, 2014, approved House Memorial No. 81 ("A memorial to the Congress of the United States, applying to Congress to call a convention for the sole purpose of proposing an amendment to the Constitution of the United States that would limit the consecutive terms of office which a member of the United States Senate or the United States House of Representatives may serve"); the House Memorial then died in the Committee on the Judiciary of the Florida Senate; (refer, however, to House Memorial No. 417, which was adopted by both chambers of the Florida Legislature, during its 2016 session, and which accomplishes basically the same thing);
- Georgia whose House of Representatives on February 20, 2014, approved House Resolution No. 1215 ("Applying for a convention of the states under Article V of the United States Constitution; and for other purposes"); the House Resolution was then referred to the Committee on Rules in the Georgia Senate where it died (refer, however, to Senate Resolution No. 736, which was likewise adopted by both chambers of the Georgia General Assembly in 2014, and which accomplishes basically the same thing);
- Maryland whose Senate on April 7, 2014, the final day of the 2014 legislative session, approved Senate Joint Resolution No. 6 ("FOR the purpose of applying to the U.S. Congress for an amendments convention called under Article V of the U.S. Constitution, on the application of the legislatures of two–thirds of the several states, to propose an amendment to the U.S. Constitution that affirms every citizen’s freedom to vote and restores free and fair elections in America; and generally relating to an application to Congress for a convention to propose an amendment to the U.S. Constitution"); the joint resolution made no further progress—not even to be transmitted to the Maryland House of Delegates for possible concurrence;
- Tennessee whose Senate on March 6, 2014, approved Senate Joint Resolution No. 493 ("A RESOLUTION to make application to the Congress of the United States pursuant to Article V of the United States Constitution to call a constitutional convention for the sole purpose of proposing a balanced budget amendment"); the joint resolution then died in the Committee on State Government of the Tennessee House of Representatives (refer, however, to House Joint Resolution No. 548, which was likewise approved by both chambers of the Tennessee General Assembly in 2014, and which accomplishes basically the same thing); and
- Wisconsin whose "lower" chamber, the Assembly, on February 18, 2014, approved Assembly Joint Resolution No. 81 ("Relating to: application to Congress under the provisions of Article V of the Constitution of the United States for a convention for proposing amendments relating to a balanced budget"); the joint resolution was referred to the Committee on Government Operations, Public Works, and Telecommunications in the Wisconsin Senate, where it died.

=== 2015 ===
During the 2015 state legislative season, it is known that Article V Convention applications received the approval of one chamber of the following 16 bicameral state legislatures:

- Arizona whose House of Representatives on February 12, 2015, approved House Concurrent Resolution No. 2003 ("applying to the Congress of the United States to call a convention for proposing amendments to the Constitution of the United States") "limited to proposing amendments to the Constitution of the United States that impose fiscal restraints on the federal government, limit the power and jurisdiction of the federal government and limit the terms of office for its officials and for members of Congress"; the concurrent resolution then died in the Committee on Rules of the Arizona Senate (refer, however, to House Concurrent Resolution No. 2010, which was adopted by both chambers of the Arizona Legislature, during its 2017 session, and which accomplishes basically the same thing);
- Arkansas whose House of Representatives on March 6, 2015, approved House Joint Resolution No. 1003 ("appl[ying] to Congress, under the provisions of Article V of the Constitution of the United States, for the calling of a convention of the states limited to proposing amendments to the Constitution of the United States that impose fiscal restraints on the federal government, limit the power and jurisdiction of the federal government, and limit the terms of office for its officials and for members of Congress"); the joint resolution then died in the Committee on State Agencies and Governmental Affairs of the Arkansas Senate;
- Connecticut whose House of Representatives on May 30, 2015, approved House Joint Resolution No. 64 ("Petitioning Congress to Convene an Article V Convention to Overturn the United States Supreme Court's Decision in Citizens United v. Federal Election Commission"); the joint resolution then died in the Connecticut Senate;
- Delaware whose Senate on March 25, 2015, approved Senate Concurrent Resolution No. 6 ("Calling for an Article V Convention to amend the United States Constitution"); the desired federal constitutional amendment would over-turn the 2010 United States Supreme Court decision in the case of Citizens United v. Federal Election Commission; the concurrent resolution then died in the Committee on House Administration of the Delaware House of Representatives;
- Hawaii whose House of Representatives on March 17, 2015, approved House Concurrent Resolution No. 53 ("requesting the United States Congress to convene a constitutional convention to propose a constitutional amendment to overturn the United States Supreme Court's decision in Citizens United v. Federal Election Commission"); the concurrent resolution then died in the Committee on Judiciary and Labor of the Hawaii Senate;
- Iowa whose House of Representatives on March 19, 2015, approved House Joint Resolution No. 8 ("applying for an Article V convention to propose amendments to the Constitution of the United States that impose fiscal restraints, and limit the power and jurisdiction of the federal government, and requesting Congress to similarly propose such amendments"); the joint resolution then died in the Committee on State Government in the Iowa Senate;
- Louisiana whose House of Representatives on May 6, 2015, approved House Concurrent Resolution No. 2 ("To apply to the United States Congress, under the provisions of Article V of the Constitution of the United States, for the calling of a convention of the states limited to proposing amendments to the Constitution of the United States that impose fiscal restraints on the federal government, limit the power and jurisdiction of the federal government, and limit the terms of office for its officials and for members of congress"); the concurrent resolution then died in the "Judiciary B" Committee of the Louisiana Senate (refer, however, to Senate Concurrent Resolution No. 52, which was approved by both chambers of the Louisiana Legislature, during its 2016 session, and which accomplishes basically the same thing);
- Maryland whose Senate on April 8, 2015, approved Senate Joint Resolution No. 2 ("FOR the purpose of applying to the U.S. Congress for an amendments convention called under Article V of the U.S. Constitution, on the application of the legislatures of two-thirds of the several states, to propose an amendment to the U.S. Constitution that affirms every citizen's individual right to vote, reserves inalienable political rights to natural persons, and authorizes regulation of campaign contributions and electioneering expenditures; and generally relating to an application to Congress for a convention to propose an amendment to the U.S. Constitution"); the joint resolution was then amended in the Maryland House of Delegates; the Maryland Senate on April 13, 2015, refused to concur in the changes made to S.J.R. No. 2 by the Maryland House of Delegates and requested the appointment of a conference committee to adjust the differences between the two legislative chambers; a conference committee was appointed, but appears to have not taken action; the 2015 session of the Maryland General Assembly concluded on that same date and the joint resolution thusly died;
- Missouri whose Senate on April 22, 2015, approved Senate Concurrent Resolution No. 21 ("applies to Congress for the calling of a convention to propose certain amendments to the United States Constitution which place limits on the federal government") which had been combined with S.C.R. No. 19 and with S.C.R. No. 23; one floor amendment to S.C.R. No. 21 was adopted in the full Senate; S.C.R. No. 21 then went to the Missouri House of Representatives for consideration, where it was favorably discharged from both the Committee on Government Efficiency as well as the Select Committee on General Laws; S.C.R. No. 21 was placed on the House's calendar for May 15, 2015, but nothing happened with it (refer, however, Senate Concurrent Resolution No. 4, which was adopted by both chambers of the Missouri General Assembly, during its 2017 session, and which accomplishes basically the same thing); and whose Senate on April 22, 2015, likewise approved Senate Concurrent Resolution No. 24 ("urges Congress to call an Article V Convention for the purpose of proposing amendments to the United States Constitution") relative to over-turning the U.S. Supreme Court's ruling in the 2010 case of Citizens United v. Federal Election Commission"; S.C.R. No. 24 then went to the Missouri House of Representatives for consideration, where it was favorably discharged from both the Committee on Energy and the Environment as well as the Select Committee on Utilities; and while favorably discharged from both of those committees, S.C.R. No. 24 was never placed upon the calendar of the Missouri House of Representatives;
- New Hampshire whose House of Representatives on March 4, 2015, approved House Concurrent Resolution No. 2 ("A Resolution applying to Congress to hold a convention for amendments") which "...address concerns raised by the decision of the United States Supreme Court in Citizens United v. Federal Election Commission, 558 U.S. 310 (2010)..."; on April 9, 2015, the concurrent resolution was received by the New Hampshire Senate, but H.C.R. No. 2 was "Not Introduced, Pursuant to Rule 3-26, MF, Lacking necessary 2/3 vote, Div. 13Y-11N" according to the New Hampshire General Court's website;
- New Mexico whose House of Representatives on March 17, 2015, approved House Joint Resolution No. 19 ("applying for a convention of the states under Article V of the United States Constitution") for amendments that would "...impose fiscal restraints on the federal government, limit the power and jurisdiction of the federal government and limit the terms of office for its officials and for Members of Congress"; the joint resolution then died in the Rules Committee of the New Mexico Senate;
- North Dakota whose House of Representatives on February 17, 2015, approved House Concurrent Resolution No. 3014 ("appl[ying] to Congress, under the provisions of Article V of the Constitution of the United States, for the calling of a convention of the states limited to proposing amendments to the Constitution of the United States that impose fiscal restraints on the federal government, limit the power and jurisdiction of the federal government, and limit the terms of office for its officials and for members of Congress") by a vote of 63 yeas and 29 nays; H.C.R. No. 3014 then went down to defeat in the North Dakota Senate on March 24, 2015, with a vote of only 15 yeas and 31 nays (refer, however, to House Concurrent Resolution No. 3006, which was adopted by both chambers of the North Dakota Legislative Assembly, during its 2017 session, and which accomplishes basically the same thing); whose House of Representatives on February 17, 2015, approved House Concurrent Resolution No. 3016 ("direct[ing] the Congress of the United States to call a convention of the states for the purpose of proposing an amendment to the Constitution of the United States to provide states a process to countermand or repeal any law or ruling and to provide a method for the states to appoint delegates to the amendment convention") by a vote of 59 yeas and 32 nays; H.C.R. No. 3016 then went down to defeat on March 24, 2015, in the North Dakota Senate with the words "Engrossed HCR 3016 was declared lost on a voice vote" appearing in the Journal of the North Dakota Senate for that day's proceedings; and whose House of Representatives on February 17, 2015, approved House Concurrent Resolution No. 3017 ("direct[ing] the Congress of the United States to call a convention of the states limited to proposing an amendment to the Constitution of the United States providing states a process to collectively countermand or repeal any law or ruling by the Congress, the President, or other regulatory body") by a vote of 56 yeas and 35 nays; H.C.R. No. 3017 then went down to defeat in the North Dakota Senate on March 24, 2015, with a vote of only 16 yeas and 30 nays;
- Oklahoma whose House of Representatives on March 11, 2015, approved House Joint Resolution No. 1018 ("calling for a convention to propose a balanced budget amendment pursuant to the provisions of Article V of the United States Constitution; making application pursuant to Article V of the United States Constitution; directing distribution; and providing scope of application"); the joint resolution then died in the Rules Committee of the Oklahoma Senate (refer, however, to Senate Joint Resolution No. 4, which was adopted by both chambers of the Oklahoma Legislature, during its 2016 session, and which accomplishes basically the same thing);
- Texas whose House of Representatives on May 14, 2015, approved House Joint Resolution No. 77 ("applying to the Congress of the United States to call a convention under Article V of the United States Constitution for the limited purpose of proposing one or more amendments to the constitution to impose fiscal restraints on the federal government, to limit the power and jurisdiction of the federal government, and to limit the terms of office of federal officials and members of Congress"); H.J.R. No. 77 then died in the Committee on State Affairs of the Texas Senate (refer, however, to Senate Joint Resolution No. 2, which was adopted by both chambers of the Texas Legislature, during its 2017 session, and which accomplishes basically the same thing); and whose House of Representatives on May 8, 2015, likewise approved House Joint Resolution No. 79 ("applying to the Congress of the United States to call a convention under Article V of the United States Constitution for the limited purpose of proposing an amendment to the constitution to provide for a federal balanced budget"); H.J.R. No. 79 then likewise died in the Committee on State Affairs of the Texas Senate (refer, however, to House Concurrent Resolution No. 31, which was adopted by both chambers of the Texas Legislature, during its 1977 session, and which accomplishes basically the same thing);
- West Virginia whose Senate on March 12, 2015, approved Senate Concurrent Resolution No. 13 ("urging the Congress of the United States to propose a balanced budget amendment to the United States Constitution and applying to the Congress, pursuant to Article V of the United States Constitution, to call a convention for proposing a balanced budget amendment"); the concurrent resolution then died in the Judiciary Committee of the West Virginia House of Delegates; (refer, however, to House Concurrent Resolution No. 36, which was approved by both chambers of the West Virginia Legislature, during its 2016 session, and which accomplishes basically the same thing); and
- Wyoming whose House of Representatives on January 28, 2015, approved House Joint Resolution No. "HJ0004" ("petitioning Congress to call a convention to propose amendments to the Constitution of the United States to require a balanced federal budget"); the joint resolution then went down to defeat in the Wyoming Senate on March 3, 2015, with only 7 yeas and 22 nays (refer, however, to House Joint Resolution No. 2, which was adopted by both chambers of the Wyoming Legislature, during its 2017 session, and which accomplishes basically the same thing).

=== 2016 ===
During the 2016 state legislative season, it is known that Article V Convention applications received the approval of one chamber of the following 10 bicameral state legislatures:

- Arizona whose House of Representatives on February 18, 2016, approved House Concurrent Resolution No. 2010 ("applying to the Congress of the United States to call a Convention for proposing Amendments to the Constitution of the United States [limited to proposing amendments that impose fiscal restraints on the federal government, limit the power and jurisdiction of the federal government and limit the terms of office for its officials and for members of Congress]"); H.C.R. No. 2010 then died in the Rules Committee of the Arizona Senate (refer, however, to House Concurrent Resolution No. 2010, which was adopted by both chambers of the Arizona Legislature, during its 2017 session, and which accomplishes basically the same thing); and whose House of Representatives on February 25, 2016, likewise approved House Concurrent Resolution No. 2014 ("applying to the Congress of the United States to call a convention for proposing an amendment to the Constitution of the United States to require that the Congress adopt a Balanced Federal Budget"); on April 28, 2016, H.C.R. No. 2014, with amendments, was approved by the Arizona Senate, thus necessitating concurrence by the Arizona House of Representatives; on May 4, 2016, according to the Arizona Legislature's website, the following action in the House, by a vote of only 6 ayes and a whopping 50 nays, failed: "VAC EMER RFE 2/3 VOTE"; the website goes on to declare: "FINAL DISPOSITION: Failed in House on Final Passage" (refer, however, to House Concurrent Resolution No. 2013, which was adopted by both chambers of the Arizona Legislature, during its 2017 session, and which accomplishes basically the same thing);
- Missouri whose House of Representatives on April 21, 2016, approved House Concurrent Resolution No. 57 ("an application to Congress for the calling of an Article V convention of states to propose certain amendments to the United States Constitution which places limits on the federal government"); the concurrent resolution then went to the Missouri Senate where—after being favorably discharged from the Committee on Senate Rules, Joint Rules, Resolutions, and Ethics—it was "taken up" on May 11, 2016, but, according to the Missouri General Assembly's website, fell victim to "Motion withdrawn - Motion to adopt HCR withdrawn" (refer, however, to Senate Concurrent Resolution No. 4, which was adopted by both chambers of the Missouri General Assembly, during its 2017 session, and which accomplishes basically the same thing);
- New Hampshire whose Senate on March 24, 2016, approved Senate Concurrent Resolution No. 3 ("applying to the United States Congress to convene a limited convention for the exclusive purpose of proposing amendments to the federal Constitution concerning election reform that do not abrogate or amend the first amendment to the federal Constitution"); S.C.R. No. 3 then went to the New Hampshire House of Representatives for consideration; there, after having been favorably discharged from the Committee on State-Federal Relations and Veterans Affairs, a motion was made on May 11, 2016, in the full House, to "Lay on Table" which motion carried with 148 yeas and 129 nays; S.C.R. No. 3 was declared to have "Died on Table" as of July 27, 2016, according to the New Hampshire General Court's website; and whose Senate likewise on March 24, 2016, approved Senate Concurrent Resolution No. 4 ("applying for an Article V convention to propose an amendment to the Constitution of the United States that imposes fiscal restraints on the federal government"); S.C.R. No. 4 met a similar fate in the New Hampshire House of Representatives and was likewise pronounced to have "Died on Table" as of July 27, 2016;
- New Mexico whose House of Representatives on January 28, 2016, approved House Joint Resolution No. 9 ("for the calling of a convention of the states limited to proposing amendments to the Constitution of the United States that impose fiscal restraints on the federal government, limit the power and jurisdiction of the federal government and limit the terms of office for its officials and for Members of Congress"); the joint resolution then went to the New Mexico Senate where it was referred to the Rules Committee; that committee favorably discharged H.J.R. No. 9 on February 13, 2016; however, in the full Senate, the joint resolution was "Postponed Indefinitely", according to the New Mexico Legislature's website;
- South Dakota whose House of Representatives on February 24, 2016, approved House Joint Resolution No. 1002 ("to apply for a Convention of the States under Article V of the United States Constitution") "limited to proposing amendments to the Constitution of the United States that impose fiscal restraints on the federal government, limit the power and jurisdiction of the federal government, and limit the terms of office for its officials and members of Congress"; the joint resolution then died in the Committee on Taxation of the South Dakota Senate;
- Utah whose House of Representatives on March 1, 2016, approved House Joint Resolution No. 8 ("for the calling of a convention of the states limited to proposing amendments to the Constitution of the United States that impose fiscal restraints on the federal government, limit the power and jurisdiction of the federal government, and limit the terms of office for its officials and for members of Congress"); H.J.R. No. 8 then died in the Committee on Business and Labor in the Utah Senate; and whose House of Representatives on March 7, 2016, likewise approved House Joint Resolution No. 18 ("to call a convention to set a limit on the number of terms that a person may be elected as a member of the United States House of Representatives and to set a limit on the number of terms that a person may be elected as a member of the United States Senate"); H.J.R. No. 18 received no further consideration in the Utah Senate than to be referred to its Rules Committee;
- Virginia whose House of Delegates on February 16, 2016, approved House Joint Resolution No. 3 ("applying to the Congress of the United States to call an amendment convention of the states pursuant to Article V of the United States Constitution that impose fiscal restraints on the federal government, limit the power and jurisdiction of the federal government, and limit the terms of office for its officials and for members of Congress"); H.J.R. No. 3 was then referred to the Committee on Rules of the Virginia Senate; and whose House of Delegates likewise on February 16, 2016, approved House Joint Resolution No. 90 ("applying to the Congress of the United States to call an amendment convention pursuant to Article V of the United States Constitution for the purpose of proposing an amendment to the United States Constitution that pertains to the subject of balancing the federal budget"); H.J.R. No. 90 was likewise referred to the Committee on Rules of the Virginia Senate;
- Washington whose House of Representatives on February 17, 2016, approved House Joint Memorial No. 4000 ("petition[ing] the United States Congress to call a Convention for the purpose of proposing Amendments to the Constitution of the United States of America as soon as two-thirds of the several states have applied for a Convention") "to address concerns such as those raised by the decision of the United States Supreme Court in Citizens United v. Federal Election Commission (2010)"; the joint memorial then went to the Senate of the State of Washington for consideration; there, it was referred on February 19, 2016, to the Committee on Government Operations and Security; on the State of Washington Legislature's website, it next shows the curious entry for March 10, 2016: "By resolution, returned to House Rules Committee for third reading"; and
- West Virginia whose Senate on February 23, 2016, approved Senate Concurrent Resolution No. 10 ("urging Congress [to] call a convention of the states, under the authority reserved to the states in Article V of the United States Constitution, limited to proposing amendments to the Constitution of the United States that impose fiscal restraints on the federal government, limit the power and jurisdiction of the federal government and limit the terms of office for its officials and for members of Congress"); the concurrent resolution then died in the Judiciary Committee of the West Virginia House of Delegates.

=== 2017 ===
During the 2017 state legislative season, it is known that Article V Convention applications received the approval of one chamber of the following four bicameral state legislatures:

- Iowa whose House of Representatives on March 15, 2017, approved House Joint Resolution No. 12 ("A joint resolution calling for an Article V convention in order to propose amendments to the Constitution of the United States that impose fiscal restraints, and limit the power and jurisdiction of the federal government, and requesting Congress to similarly propose such amendments"); the joint resolution was then referred to the Committee on State Government in the Iowa Senate;
- North Carolina whose Senate on April 26, 2017, approved Senate Joint Resolution No. 36 ("A Joint Resolution applying to Congress for an Article V Convention of the states with the purpose of proposing amendments to the United States Constitution"); the joint resolution was then referred to the Committee on Rules, Calendar, and Operations of the House of the North Carolina House of Representatives;
- Utah whose House of Representatives on February 27, 2017, approved House Joint Resolution No. 12 ("applies to Congress to call a convention for proposing amendments to the United States Constitution in accordance with Article V of the Constitution and limits the scope of the convention to establishing a limit on the number of terms that a person may be elected as a member of the United States House of Representatives and the United States Senate"); the joint resolution then died in the Utah Senate; and
- Wyoming whose House of Representatives on January 19, 2017, approved House Joint Resolution No. "0003" ("requesting Congress to call a convention for the purpose of proposing an amendment to the Constitution of the United States to require that every law enacted by Congress shall embrace only one subject, which shall be clearly expressed in its title"); the joint resolution then died in the Wyoming Senate.

Likewise during the 2017 state legislative season, there was one state in which an alleged Article V Convention so-called "application" was approved by only one chamber of a bicameral legislature. That was:

- Hawaii whose House of Representatives on April 6, 2017, approved House Resolution No. 25 ("Urging the United States Congress to Restore Free and Fair Elections by Applying for a Convention to Propose Amendments to the United States Constitution.") Hawaii's H.R. No. 25, upon closer inspection, is structurally flawed inasmuch as that resolution is strictly unicameral. As such, it was never even transmitted to the Hawaii Senate for that body's consideration, despite H.R. No. 25's laughable and presumptuous inclusion—in its first "resolving clause"—of the wording "...the Senate concurring..." as the Hawaii House of Representatives, claiming to be the full Legislature, supposedly "...submit[ed] an application to the United States Congress to restore free and fair elections as described herein...". Adding further hilarity, H.R. No. 25, in its second "resolving clause", self-identifies as a "Concurrent Resolution" when, of course, it is a strictly unicameral—NOT bicameral—resolution. Of course, validity as an actual Article V application requires that both chambers of the bicameral Hawaii Legislature so resolve. On August 2, 2017, the Hawaii House of Representatives' H.R. No. 25 was officially received by the United States Senate, was designated by the U.S. Senate as "POM-79", and was referred to the Committee on the Judiciary in that body (See 163 Congressional Record, page S4764, soft-cover preliminary edition).

=== 2018 ===
During the 2018 state legislative season, it is known that there were four Article V Convention applications which received the approval of just one chamber of the following bicameral state legislatures:

- Arizona whose House of Representatives, on February 26, 2018, adopted House Concurrent Resolution No. 2024 ("applying to the Congress of the United States to call a convention for proposing an amendment to the Constitution of the United States to set term limits for United States Representatives and United States Senators") which then died in the Arizona Senate;
- Hawaii whose Senate on April 5, 2018, adopted Senate Concurrent Resolution No. 76 ("requesting Congress to convene a limited national convention under Article V for the exclusive purpose of proposing an amendment to the United States Constitution that will limit the influence of money in our electoral process"); the concurrent resolution was then jointly referred to the Judiciary Committee as well as to the Finance Committee of the Hawaii House of Representatives, whereupon it died;
- Maryland whose House of Delegates, on March 13, 2018, adopted House Joint Resolution No. 11 ("applying to the U.S. Congress for an amendments convention called under Article V of the U.S. Constitution, on the application of the legislatures of two-thirds of the several states, to propose an amendment to the U.S. Constitution that authorizes regulation of contributions and expenditures intended to influence elections; and generally relating to an application to Congress for a convention to propose an amendment to the U.S. Constitution") which then died in the Maryland Senate; and
- Mississippi whose House of Representatives on March 22, 2018, adopted House Concurrent Resolution No. 56 ("A Concurrent Resolution applying to the United States Congress to call a Convention of the States under the provisions of Article V of the United States Constitution") which received no further consideration in the Mississippi Senate than to be referred to that body's Rules Committee, whereupon it died.

=== 2019 ===
During the 2019 state legislative season, it is known that there were three Article V Convention applications which received the approval of just one chamber of the following bicameral state legislatures:

- Georgia whose Senate, on March 7, 2019, adopted Senate Resolution No. 237 ("Requesting that the United States Congress call a convention under Article V of the Constitution of the United States limited to proposing an amendment to the Constitution of the United States to set a limit on the number of terms that a person may be elected as a member of the United States House of Representatives and to set a limit on the number of terms that a person may be elected as a member of the United States Senate; and for other purposes") which received no further consideration in the House of Representatives than to be referred to that body's Committee on Rules, whereupon it died;
- Hawaii whose Senate, on April 1, 2019, adopted Senate Concurrent Resolution No. 131 ("REQUESTING CONGRESS TO CONVENE A LIMITED NATIONAL CONVENTION UNDER ARTICLE V OF THE UNITED STATES CONSTITUTION FOR THE EXCLUSIVE PURPOSE OF PROPOSING AN AMENDMENT TO THE UNITED STATES CONSTITUTION THAT WILL LIMIT THE INFLUENCE OF MONEY IN THE ELECTORAL PROCESS") which received no further consideration than to be referred both to the Committee on Finance and to the Committee on the Judiciary in the Hawaii House of Representatives, whereupon it died; and
- West Virginia whose House of Delegates on March 8, 2019, adopted House Concurrent Resolution No. 61 ("Applying to and urging Congress to call a convention of the states, under the authority reserved to the states in Article V of the United States Constitution, limited to proposing amendments to the Constitution of the United States and to limit the terms of office that a person may be elected as a Member of the United States House of Representatives and to set a limit on the number of terms that a person may be elected as a Member of the United States Senate") which ran out of time for consideration in the Senate.

=== 2020 ===
During the 2020 state legislative season, it is known that there was one Article V Convention application which received the approval of just one chamber of the following bicameral state legislature:

- Louisiana whose House of Representatives, on May 18, 2020, adopted House Concurrent Resolution No. 28 ("to memorialize the United States Congress to call a convention of states for the purpose of proposing amendments to set a limit on the number of terms that a person may be elected as a member of the United States House of Representatives and to set a limit on the number of terms that a person may be elected as a member of the United States Senate") which was voted down on the floor of the full Louisiana Senate with a tally of 16 yeas and 18 nays on May 31, 2020.

== Attempts to limit or restrict delegates attending an Article V Convention ==
The last time that a proposed Federal law was introduced in Congress to establish procedures for—and to impose limitations and restrictions upon—delegates attending an Article V amendatory convention was in 1991 when United States Senator Orrin Hatch of Utah offered the bill S. 214 ("Constitutional Convention Implementation Act of 1991") during the 102nd Congress. Senator Hatch's proposed Federal legislation received no further consideration than to be referred to the Committee on the Judiciary in the United States Senate on January 15, 1991.

Noting that, for more than two decades, Congress has demonstrated no interest in clarifying, via Federal statute, the limitations and restrictions of an Article V amendatory convention—and deeming it proper to take matters into their own hands—lawmakers in exactly half of the 50 states have offered legislation in recent years to impose, in state law, limitations and restrictions upon delegates (from those specific states) who would be participating in a national Article V Convention. While there might be others, the following are known examples from 25 states:

=== 2011 ===
- Hawaii in which Senate Concurrent Resolution No. 86 was introduced ("Providing for the appointment of convention delegates to the convention to propose amendments to the U.S. Constitution") and which—had it been approved—would have resolved that Hawaii's delegates "...consider themselves an extension of the [Hawaii] Legislature."; the concurrent resolution died in the Hawaii Senate's Committee on Judiciary and Labor as well as in its Committee on Ways and Means;
- Illinois in which Senate Bill No. 2204 was introduced ("Creates the No Runaway Convention and Single Amendment Limitation Act. Provides that no delegate from Illinois to a Convention has the authority to vote to consider or approve any proposed amendment to the United States Constitution other than the amendment authorized in the Madison Amendment (an Amendment concerning fiscal discipline, legislative transparency, and unfunded mandates.) Sets forth the provisions of the Madison Amendment. Sets forth the oath and duties of an Illinois delegate"); on February 10, 2011, the bill was referred to the Illinois Senate's Committee on Assignments; on March 2, 2011, it was re-referred to the Committee on Executive; on March 17, 2011, the Committee on Executive postponed the bill; on March 18, 2011, the bill was re-referred to the Committee on Assignments; the bill made no further progress;
- New Mexico in which House Bill No. 121 was introduced ("Relating to the United States Constitution; Providing for Participation in a Constitutional Convention to Consider only one Subject; Providing a Penalty"); the bill was referred to—and died in—the Consumer and Public Affairs Committee of the New Mexico House of Representatives; and
- Tennessee in which both House Bill No. 1704 and Senate Bill No. 1473 were introduced ("An Act amend[ing] Tennessee Code Annotated, relative to limiting the authority of delegates to Article V Amendment Conventions"); H.B. No. 1704 died in the Committee on State and Local Government in the Tennessee House of Representatives; while S.B. No. 1473 died in the Committee on State and Local Government of the Tennessee Senate.

=== 2012 ===
- Idaho in which Senate Bill No. 1362 was introduced ("relating to an application of the State of Idaho under Article V of the United States Constitution for a convention for proposing amendments to the United States Constitution; providing legislative intent; amending Title 67, Idaho Code, by the addition of a new Chapter 93, Title 67, Idaho Code, to define terms, to provide for the instruction to, scope and limitation of authority of, and compensation of said delegates, to provide duties of the Secretary of State and to provide a citation"); this bill was defeated, on a roll-call vote, on the floor of the Idaho Senate on March 14, 2012, with a vote of 13 yeas and 21 nays;
- New Hampshire in which Senate Bill No. 356 was introduced ("An Act limiting the authority of delegates to Article V amendment conventions"); this bill was approved by the New Hampshire Senate on February 8, 2012; the bill was subsequently approved, with amendment, by the New Hampshire House of Representatives on May 15, 2012; on June 6, 2012, both bodies adopted the conference committee report adjusting the differences between the two chambers. However, the bill was then vetoed by the Governor; on June 27, 2012, the New Hampshire Senate voted to override the Governor's veto, but—on that same day—the House of Representatives was not able to muster the super-majority vote necessary for overriding that veto;
- South Dakota in which House Bill No. 1222 was introduced ("An Act to limit the authority of South Dakota delegates to an Article V convention to amend the United States Constitution, to prohibit any delegate from exceeding such authority, and to provide certain penalties therefor"); the bill died in the Committee on Local Government in the South Dakota House of Representatives;
- Tennessee in which both House Bill No. 3707 and Senate Bill No. 3695 were introduced ("An Act to amend Tennessee Code Annotated, Title 3, relative to limiting the authority of delegates to an Article V Amendment Convention"); H.B. No. 3707 died in the Judiciary Committee of the Tennessee House of Representatives; while S.B. No. 3695 died in the Judiciary Committee of the Tennessee Senate;
- Utah in which House Bill No. 404 was introduced ("...enacts Title 36, Chapter 28, Convention for Proposing Amendments to the United States Constitution Act"); the bill was publicly numbered and distributed on March 6, 2012, and referred that same day to the Rules Committee of the Utah House of Representatives where it died; and
- Virginia in which House Bill No. 619 was introduced ("A Bill to amend the Code of Virginia by adding in Chapter 2 of Title 24.2 an article numbered 4.1, consisting of a section numbered 24.2-216.1, relating to a convention to amend the United States Constitution; selection and participation of Virginia delegates"); the bill died in the Committee on Privileges and Elections in the Virginia House of Delegates.

=== 2013 ===
- Idaho in which Senate Bill No. 1075 was introduced ("Relating to an Application of the State of Idaho under Article V of the United States Constitution for a Convention for Proposing Amendments to the United States Constitution; Providing Legislative Intent; Amending Title 34, Idaho Code, by the Addition of a new Chapter 16, Title 34, Idaho Code, to Define Terms, to Provide for the Appointment of Delegates to the Convention, to Provide for the Instruction to, Scope and Limitation of Authority of, and Compensation of said Delegates, To Provide Duties of the Secretary of State and to Provide a Citation"); the bill died in the State Affairs Committee of the Idaho Senate;
- Indiana in which Senate Bill No. 224 was not only introduced, but was actually enacted into state law ("Describes the duties of delegates and alternate delegates to a convention called under Article V of the Constitution of the United States. Provides that a vote cast by a delegate or an alternate delegate that is outside the scope of the instructions given by the general assembly is void. Provides that a delegate or alternate delegate who votes or attempts to vote outside the scope of the instructions given by the general assembly forfeits the delegate's appointment by virtue of that vote or attempt to vote. Provides that the call by the general assembly for an Article V convention is withdrawn if all delegates and alternate delegates vote or attempt to vote outside the scope of the instructions given by the general assembly. Provides that a delegate or alternate delegate who knowingly or intentionally votes or attempts to vote outside the scope of the instructions commits a Class D felony. Establishes an advisory group to evaluate whether a delegate or an alternate delegate has acted outside the scope of instructions"); the bill passed both houses of the Indiana General Assembly and was signed into law by the Governor of Indiana on May 7, 2013; it is now "Public Law 182"; as well as Senate Bill No. 225 which likewise became state law ("Provides for the appointment of delegates and alternate delegates by the General Assembly to a convention called for proposing amendments to the Constitution of the United States called for by the states under Article V of the Constitution of the United States. Establishes the qualifications of delegates and alternate delegates"); the bill passed both houses of the Indiana General Assembly and was signed into law by the Governor of Indiana on May 7, 2013; it is now "Public Law 183";
- New Mexico in which House Bill No. 156 was introduced ("Relating to Constitutional Conventions; providing guidelines for delegates from New Mexico to an Article 5 Constitutional Convention; providing penalties; declaring an emergency") as well as House Bill No. 363 ("Relating to limitations on authority of New Mexico delegates to a 'convention for proposing amendments' [Article V, United States of America Constitution]; declaring an emergency"); both bills died in the Committee on Voters and Elections of the New Mexico House of Representatives;
- North Dakota in which House Concurrent Resolution No. 3039 was introduced ("A concurrent resolution to create and enact a new section to article IV of the Constitution of North Dakota, relating to consideration by the legislative assembly of amendments to the United States Constitution"); the concurrent resolution was adopted by the North Dakota House of Representatives on March 21, 2013, but was later defeated in the North Dakota Senate on April 4, 2013, by a lopsided vote of only 4 yeas and 41 nays; and
- Oklahoma in which House Bill No. 1530 was introduced ("An Act relating to statutes and reports; providing for delegates to a federal constitutional convention; defining terms; prohibiting delegates from performing certain acts; providing for recall for a violation; requiring delegates to take an oath; specifying oath; requiring the Legislature to perform certain duties; providing criminal penalty for violation of oath; providing for codification; providing an effective date; and declaring an emergency"); the bill never received floor consideration in the Oklahoma House of Representatives.

=== 2014 ===
- Alabama in which Senate Bill No. 199 was introduced ("Relating to Article V Conventions; to establish duties for appointed delegates and alternate delegates; to require the Legislature, by joint resolution, to adopt instructions to delegates; to provide that a vote outside the scope of the instructions is void; to provide criminal penalties for exceeding the scope of instructions from the Legislature; and in connection therewith would have as its purpose or effect the requirement of a new or increased expenditure of local funds within the meaning of Amendment 621 of the Constitution of Alabama of 1901, now appearing as Section 111.05 of the Official Recompilation of the Constitution of Alabama of 1901, as amended") as well as Senate Bill No. 200 ("Relating to Article V Conventions; to provide for the qualifications and appointment of delegates and alternate delegates to represent this state at an Article V Convention; to provide for the recall of a delegate; to provide for the reimbursement for certain expenses; to require delegates and alternate delegates to execute an oath; and to provide for the filing of the oath with the Secretary of State"); neither bill received floor consideration in the Alabama Senate;
- Alaska in which House Bill No. 310 was introduced ("An Act relating to the selection and duties of delegates to a United States constitutional convention"); on April 4, 2014, the Alaska House of Representatives approved H.B. No. 310 by a vote of 23 yeas and 14 nays; the bill then died in the Alaska Senate;
- Arizona in which House Bill No. 2397 was introduced ("AN ACT Amending Title 16, Chapter 4, Article 14, Arizona Revised Statutes, by adding Section 16‑712; relating to constitutional conventions"); H.B. No. 2397 was approved by the Arizona House of Representatives on February 24, 2014, by a vote of 36 yeas and 23 nays; H.B. No. 2397 then died in the Arizona Senate; as well as House Bill No. 2433 ("AN ACT Amending Title 1, Arizona Revised Statutes, by adding Chapter 7; relating to state convention for proposing amendments"); and Senate Bill No. 1360 ("AN ACT Amending Title 1, Arizona Revised Statutes, by adding Chapter 7; relating to Constitutional Conventions"); neither H.B. No. 2433 nor S.B. No. 1360 received floor consideration in their respective houses of origin;
- Florida in which House Bill No. 609 was introduced ("A bill to be entitled An act relating to Article V constitutional conventions; creating s. 11.93, F.S.; providing a short title; creating s. 11.931, F.S.; providing for applicability; creating s. 11.932, F.S.; providing definitions; creating s. 11.933, F.S.; establishing qualifications of delegates and alternate delegates to an Article V constitutional convention; creating s. 11.9331, F.S.; providing for the appointment of delegates by the Legislature; creating s. 11.9332, F.S.; requiring majority vote approval in each chamber for the appointment of delegates; creating s. 11.9333, F.S.; authorizing the Legislature to recall a delegate and fill a vacancy; authorizing the Governor to call a special legislative session to fill a vacancy; creating s. 11.9334, F.S.; establishing a legislative method for appointments and recalls; creating s. 11.9335, F.S.; providing for the reimbursement of delegates and alternate delegates for per diem and travel expenses; creating s. 11.9336, F.S.; requiring delegates and alternate delegates to execute a written oath of responsibilities; creating s. 11.9337, F.S.; providing for the filing of delegates' oaths and the issuance of commissions; creating s. 11.934, F.S.; providing for instructions to delegates and alternate delegates; creating s. 11.9341, F.S.; establishing duties of alternate delegates; creating s. 11.9342, F.S.; establishing circumstances under which a convention vote is declared void; creating s. 11.9343, F.S.; providing circumstances under which a delegate or alternate delegate's appointment is forfeited; creating s. 11.9344, F.S.; establishing circumstances under which the application to call an Article V convention ceases to be a continuing application and is deemed to have no effect; creating s. 11.9345, F.S.; providing penalties for a delegate or alternate delegate who votes or attempts to vote outside the scope of the Legislature's instructions or the limits of the call for a constitutional convention; creating ss. 11.935, 11.9351, and 11.9352, F.S.; establishing a delegate advisory group, its membership, duties, and responsibilities; providing an effective date"); which was approved by the Florida House of Representatives on April 11, 2014, and then approved by the Florida Senate on April 25, 2014; H.B. No. 609 was signed into law by Florida's Governor on June 2, 2014; and Senate Bill No. 1008 ("An act relating to Article V constitutional conventions; creating s. 11.93, F.S.; providing a short title; creating s. 11.931, F.S.; providing for applicability; creating s. 11.932, F.S.; providing definitions; creating s. 11.933, F.S.; establishing qualifications of delegates and alternate delegates to an Article V constitutional convention; creating s. 11.9331, F.S.; providing for the appointment of delegates by the Legislature; creating s. 11.9332, F.S.; requiring majority vote approval in each chamber for the appointment of delegates; creating s. 11.9333, F.S.; authorizing the Legislature to recall a delegate and fill a vacancy; authorizing the Governor to call a special legislative session to fill a vacancy; creating s. 11.9334, F.S.; establishing a legislative method for appointments and recalls; creating s. 11.9335, F.S.; providing for the reimbursement of delegates and alternate delegates for per diem and travel expenses; creating s. 11.9336, F.S.; requiring delegates and alternate delegates to execute a written oath of responsibilities; creating s. 11.9337, F.S.; providing for the filing of delegates’ oaths and the issuance of commissions; creating s. 11.934, F.S.; providing for instructions to delegates and alternate delegates; creating s. 11.9341, F.S.; establishing duties of alternate delegates; creating s. 11.9342, F.S.; establishing circumstances under which a convention vote is declared void; creating s. 11.9343, F.S.; providing circumstances under which a delegate or alternate delegate’s appointment is forfeited; creating s. 11.9344, F.S.; establishing circumstances under which the application to call an Article V convention ceases to be a continuing application and is deemed to have no effect; creating s. 11.9345, F.S.; providing penalties for a delegate or alternate delegate who votes or attempts to vote outside the scope of the Legislature’s instructions or the limits of the call for a constitutional convention; creating ss. 11.935, 11.9351, and 11.9352, F.S.; establishing a delegate advisory group, its membership, duties, and responsibilities; providing an effective date");
- Georgia in which House Bill No. 929 was introduced ("A BILL to be entitled an Act to amend Chapter 1 of Title 50 of the Official Code of Georgia Annotated, relating to general provisions regarding state government, so as to provide definitions; to provide for the method of selecting delegates and alternate delegates to an Article V convention; to provide for the qualifications of delegates and alternate delegates; to provide for the recall of delegates and alternate delegates; to provide for oaths; to provide for expenses; to provide for related matters; to repeal conflicting laws; and for other purposes"); and House Bill No. 930 ("A BILL to be entitled an Act to amend Chapter 1 of Title 50 of the O.C.G.A., relating to general provisions regarding state government; to provide that the General Assembly shall adopt standards and instructions for Article V convention delegates; to provide for the revocation of a resolution calling for an Article V convention under certain circumstances; to prohibit certain votes by delegates and alternate delegates; to provide for penalties; to provide for an advisory group and its composition, powers, duties, and procedures; to provide for related matters; to repeal conflicting laws; and for other purposes"); H.B. No. 930 was approved by the Georgia House of Representatives on March 3, 2014, with a vote of 115 yeas and 62 nays; the Georgia Senate on March 20, 2014, approved H.B. No. 930 with a vote of 42 yeas and 10 nays (as amended); on that same day of March 20, 2014, the Georgia House of Representatives concurred in the Senate's amendment; H.B. No. 930 was signed into law by Georgia's Governor on April 15, 2014; as well as Senate Bill No. 206 ("A BILL to be entitled an Act to amend Chapter 6 of Title 28 of the Official Code of Georgia Annotated, relating to interstate cooperation, so as to provide for delegations from the State of Georgia to certain conventions called by the Congress of the United States for proposing amendments to the Constitution of the United States pursuant to Article V of said constitution; to provide an effective date; to repeal conflicting laws; and for other purposes") which, after passing the Georgia Senate on March 7, 2013, was approved by the Georgia House of Representatives on almost a year later on February 20, 2014, with a vote of 102 yeas, 68 nays, and 3 not voting; S.B. No. 206 was signed into law by Georgia's Governor on April 29, 2014;
- Idaho in which Senate Bill No. 1289 was introduced ("Relating to an Application of the State of Idaho under Article V of the United States Constitution for a Convention for Proposing Amendments to the United States Constitution; Providing legislative intent; Amending Title 34, Idaho Code, by the addition of a new Chapter 6, Title 34, Idaho Code, to define terms, to provide for the Appointment of Delegates to the Convention, to provide for the instruction to, scope and limitation of authority of, and compensation of said delegates, to provide duties of the Secretary of State and to provide a citation");
- Kansas in which Senate Bill No. 431 was introduced ("AN ACT concerning a convention under article V of the constitution of the United States; prescribing appointment and qualifications of delegates; duties and responsibilities thereof; instruction for delegates by the legislature; creating a joint committee of correspondence");
- Kentucky in which House Bill No. 449 was introduced ("AN ACT related to calling an Article V convention"); and House Bill No. 450 ("AN ACT related to appointment of delegates to United States Constitution convention");
- Michigan in which House Bill No. 5380 was introduced ("A bill to provide for the appointment of article V convention delegates; to provide the powers and duties of those delegates; and to provide for the duties of certain state governmental officials"); although the bill was passed by both houses of the Michigan Legislature, it was later VETOED by Michigan's Governor on December 30, 2014;
- Missouri in which House Bill No. 2036 was introduced ("To amend chapter 21, RSMo, by adding thereto six new sections relating to the Article V convention act");
- Mississippi in which House Bill No. 536 was introduced ("An Act to Provide a Procedure Relating to a Convention Called for Proposing Amendments to the United States Constitution; to Provide that the Delegates shall be Appointed by the Legislature; to Require Delegates be Residents of the State of Mississippi; to place Certain Conditions on the Delegates; to provide for the Removal of a Delegate who Votes in Violation of the Conditions; to Provide a Penalty for Willful Violations by a Delegate; to Establish the Article V Convention Delegate Advisory Group and set forth its Powers and Duties; and for Related Purposes"); as well as House Bill No. 664 ("An Act To Restrict The Work Of Delegates Appointed By The Legislature To A Constitutional Convention Called Under Article V Of The United States Constitution To Those Amendments Authorized In Legislative Instructions; To Require The Recall Of Any Delegate Voting To Consider Or Approve An Unauthorized Amendment; And For Related Purposes"); along with Senate Bill No. 2700 ("An Act to Create the Article V Convention Faithless Delegate Act; to Provide a Procedure Relating to a Convention called for Proposing Amendments to the United States Constitution; to Provide that the Delegates shall be Appointed by the Legislature; to Require Delegates be Residents of the State of Mississippi; to place certain conditions on the Delegates; to Provide for the Removal of a Delegate who votes in Violation of the Conditions; to Provide a penalty for willful violations by a Delegate; and for related purposes"); joined by Senate Bill No. 2705 ("An Act To Create The Article V Convention Faithless Delegate Act; To Provide A Procedure Relating To A Convention Called For Proposing Amendments To The United States Constitution; To Provide That The Delegates Shall Be Appointed By The Legislature; To Require Delegates Be Residents Of The State Of Mississippi; To Place Certain Conditions On The Delegates; To Provide For The Removal Of A Delegate Who Votes In Violation Of The Conditions; To Provide A Penalty For Willful Violations By A Delegate; And For Related Purposes"); and Senate Bill No. 2788 ("An Act Prescribed to Define the Duties of Delegates and Alternate Delegates to a Convention Called Under Article V of the Constitution of the United States; Provide that a Vote Cast by a Delegate or an Alternate Delegate that is Outside the Scope of the Instructions Given by the Legislature is Void; Provide that a Delegate or Alternate Delegate who Votes or Attempts to Vote Outside the Scope of the Instructions Given by the Legislature Forfeits the Delegates Appointment by Virtue of the Vote or Attempt to Vote; Provide that the Call by the Legislature for an Article V Convention is Withdrawn if all Delegates and Alternate Delegates Vote or Attempt to Vote Outside the Scope of the Instructions Given by the Legislature; Provide that a Delegate or Alternate Delegate who Knowingly or Intentionally Votes or Attempts to Vote Outside the Scope of the Instructions Commits Crime. Establish an Advisory Group to Evaluate Whether a Delegate or an Alternate Delegate has Acted Outside the Scope of Instruction; and for Related Purposes");
- Oklahoma in which House Joint Resolution No. 1083 was introduced ("A Joint Resolution urging Congress to propose a balanced budget amendment; making application for a Constitutional Convention limited to proposing a balanced budget amendment; explaining purpose and scope of application; limiting authorization of delegates, representatives or participants to the Convention; prohibiting delegates from voting on unauthorized amendments; requiring delegates to take oath; providing penalty for violation of oath; providing that application is a continuing application that supersedes prior applications; and providing for distribution"); and House Bill No. 1530 ("An Act relating to statutes and reports; providing for delegates to a federal constitutional convention; defining terms; prohibiting delegates from performing certain acts; providing for recall for a violation; requiring delegates to take an oath; specifying oath; requiring the Legislature to perform certain duties; providing criminal penalty for violation of oath; providing for codification; providing an effective date; and declaring an emergency"); as well as Senate Joint Resolution No. 61 ("A Joint Resolution urging Congress to propose a balanced budget amendment; making application for a Constitutional Convention limited to proposing a balanced budget amendment; explaining purpose and scope of application; limiting authorization of delegates, representatives or participants to the Convention; prohibiting delegates from voting on unauthorized amendments; requiring delegates to take oath; providing penalty for violation of oath; providing that application is a continuing application that supersedes prior applications; and directing distribution");
- South Dakota in which House Bill No. 1136 was introduced ("FOR AN ACT ENTITLED, An Act to limit the authority of delegates to a limited Article V convention to vote for unauthorized amendments contrary to legislative instructions and to provide a civil fine for the violation thereof"); on February 11, 2014, by a narrow vote of 33 yeas and 37 nays, H.B. No. 1136 was defeated in the South Dakota House of Representatives; the next day, a motion to reconsider that vote resulted again in defeat, but by the even narrower margin of 35 yeas and 35 nays;
- Tennessee in which House Bill No. 1379 was introduced ("AN ACT to amend Tennessee Code Annotated, Title 2 and Title 3, relative to relative to Article V conventions and delegates") as well as Senate Bill No. 1394 ("AN ACT to amend Tennessee Code Annotated, Title 3, relative to an Article V convention"); and Senate Bill No. 1432 ("AN ACT to amend Tennessee Code Annotated, Title 2 and Title 3, relative to relative to Article V conventions and delegates") on February 24, 2014, the Tennessee Senate approved S.B. No. 1432 by a vote of 30 yeas and 1 nay; S.B. No. 1432 was then approved, as amended, by the Tennessee House of Representatives on April 16, 2014, by a vote of 77 yeas and 10 nays; on April 17, 2014, the Senate concurred in the House's amendment; S.B. No. 1432 was signed into law by Tennessee's Governor on May 22, 2014;
- Utah in which House Bill No. 392 was introduced ("establishes requirements for a Utah delegate to a United States constitutional convention"); H.B. No. 392, as substituted, was approved by the Utah House of Representatives on March 6, 2014; the bill was then approved by the Utah Senate on March 12, 2014; on April 1, 2014, the Governor of Utah signed H.B. No. 392 into law;
- Virginia in which House Bill No. 437 was introduced ("A BILL to amend the Code of Virginia by adding in Chapter 2 of Title 24.2 an article numbered 4.1, consisting of a section numbered 24.2-216.1, relating to a convention to amend the United States Constitution; selection and participation of Virginia delegates") as well as Senate Bill No. 105 ("A Bill to amend the Code of Virginia by adding in Title 30 a chapter numbered 55, consisting of sections numbered 30-348, 30-349, and 30-350, relating to a convention to amend the United States Constitution; delegates"); House Bill No. 437 was defeated in the Virginia House of Delegates on February 6, 2014, by a vote of 40 yeas and 58 nays;
- West Virginia in which House Bill No. 3029 was introduced ("A BILL to amend the Code of West Virginia, 1931, as amended, be amended by adding thereto a new article, designated §3-11A-1, §3-11A-2, §3-11A-3 and §3-11A-4, all relating to providing a procedure for West Virginia to select delegates to an Article V convention for proposing amendments to the Constitution of the United States of America; definitions; delegate duties and responsibilities; and providing a felony criminal penalty for violation of a delegate's oath");
- Wisconsin in which Assembly Bill No. 635 was introduced ("An Act to create 13.176 of the statutes; relating to: appointing delegates for a convention under Article V of the United States Constitution"); on February 18, 2014, the bill was approved by the Assembly with a vote of 58 yeas, 38 nays, and 2 paired; the bill then died in the Wisconsin Senate; and
- Wyoming in which "House Bill No. 0027" was introduced ("AN ACT relating to constitutional conventions; providing limits on the authority of delegates to a constitutional convention as specified; providing for penalties; providing for rules and regulations; and providing for an effective date").

=== 2015 ===
- Alabama in which Senate Bill No. 112 was introduced ("relating to Article V Conventions; to provide for the qualifications and appointment of delegates and alternate delegates to represent this state at an Article V Convention; to provide for the recall of a delegate; to provide for the reimbursement for certain expenses; to require delegates and alternate delegates to execute an oath; and to provide for filing of the oath with the Secretary of State") and in which Senate Bill No. 372 was offered ("relating to Article V Conventions; to establish duties for appointed delegates and alternate delegates; to require the Legislature, by joint resolution, to adopt instructions to delegates; to provide that a vote outside the scope of the instructions is void; to provide criminal penalties for exceeding the scope of instructions form the Legislature; and in connection therewith would have as its purpose or effect the requirement of a new or increased expenditure of local funds within the meaning of Amendment 621 of the Constitution of Alabama of 1901, now appearing as Section 111.05 of the Official Recompilation of the Constitution of Alabama of 1901, as amended"); both bills were "indefinitely postponed" in the Alabama Senate;
- South Dakota in which House Bill No. 1069 was introduced ("An Act to limit the authority of delegates to a limited Article V convention to vote for unauthorized amendments contrary to legislative instructions and to provide a civil fine for the violation thereof"); the bill was approved by the South Dakota House of Representatives on January 28, 2015, and went on to be passed by the South Dakota Senate on February 17, 2015; the Governor then signed H.B. No. 1069 into law on February 25, 2015.

=== 2016 ===
- Alaska in which House Concurrent Resolution No. 4 was introduced ("relating to the duties of delegates selected by the legislature to attend a convention of the states called under art. V, Constitution of the United States, to consider a countermand amendment to the Constitution of the United States; establishing as a joint committee of the legislature the Delegate Credential Committee and relating to the duties of the committee; providing for an oath for delegates and alternates to a countermand amendment convention; providing for a chair and assistant chair of the state's countermand amendment delegation; providing for the duties of the chair and assistant chair; providing instructions for the selection of a convention president; and providing specific language for the countermand amendment on which the state's convention delegates are authorized by the legislature to vote to approve") which was adopted by the Alaska House of Representatives on April 10, 2016; the concurrent resolution was then adopted by the Alaska Senate on April 15, 2016.

=== 2017 ===
- Texas in which Senate Bill No. 21 was approved by the Texas Senate on February 28, 2017 ("relating to the qualifications, duties, and limitations of Texas delegates to a convention called under Article V of the United States Constitution; providing a criminal penalty"); and
- Wyoming in which House Bill No. "HB0050" was approved by the Wyoming House of Representatives on January 20, 2017, and then approved by the Wyoming Senate on March 3, 2017—with the House concurring in some, but not all, amendments previously tacked on by the Senate ("relating to a convention for proposing amendments to the United States constitution; specifying limitations on delegates to a United States constitution Article V convention; providing penalties for violation of oath; clarifying state convention refers to a state ratifying convention; and providing for an effective date"); the bill is now designated as House Enrolled Act No. 123.

== Legislation offered in Congress to call an Article V Convention ==
In January 1975, during the 94th Congress, U.S. Congressman Jerry Pettis, a Republican from California, introduced House Concurrent Resolution No. 28, calling a convention to propose amendments to the Constitution. In H.Con.Res. 28, Pettis proposed that each state would be entitled to send as many delegates to the convention as it had Senators and Representatives in Congress and that such delegates would be selected in the manner designated by the legislature of each state. With Pettis' death, his colleague, Representative Norman F. Lent, a Republican from New York, introduced similar legislation, House Concurrent Resolution No. 340, during August 1977, for the consideration of the 95th Congress. Both the Pettis and Lent concurrent resolutions received no further consideration than to be referred to the Committee on the Judiciary in the U.S. House of Representatives. In more recent years, Representative Jodey Arrington, a Republican from Texas, offered House Concurrent Resolution No. 101, during July of 2022, for the consideration of the 117th Congress, containing provisions that Congress call such a convention. Arrington again presented this legislation during the 118th Congress as House Concurrent Resolution No. 24. And, most recently, he re-introduced this legislation for the consideration of the 119th Congress as House Concurrent Resolution No. 15. In all three cases, Arrington's measures have received no further consideration than to be referred to the House's Judiciary Committee.

== Other proposals for a Convention of the States ==
Employing a slightly different strategy not attempted previously, there was, in the years 2013 through 2016, a movement afoot within the legislatures of some states to invoke that provision of the United States Constitution which allows for interstate compacts (namely Article I, Section 10) to be utilized for setting uniform ground rules on the applying process for the calling of an Article V convention to propose an amendment to the Constitution which, if such an amendment were to be ratified, would require that the Federal budget be balanced.

From 2013 to 2016, bills are known to have been offered in a number of states that would, if passed, form such a "Compact for America".

=== 2013 ===
- Arizona in which House Bill No. 2328 was introduced ("Amending Title 41, Chapter 2.1, Arizona Revised Statutes, by Adding Article 2; Relating to the Compact Regarding a Balanced Budget Amendment Under Article V of the United States Constitution");
- Connecticut in which Senate Bill No. 584 was introduced ("An Act Concerning the Compact for America; to require the state to enter into an agreement to adopt and ratify a balanced budget amendment under Article V of the United States Constitution"); and
- New Mexico in which House Bill No. 241 was introduced ("Relating to the Constitution of the United States of America; Enacting the Compact with America; Declaring an Emergency").

Taking yet another approach is the concept of a "management study" offered during 2013 in North Dakota (House Bill No. 1446) which a management study would be "...related to the calling of a convention under article V of the United States Constitution, including concerns associated with a 'runaway' convention and methods through which states have addressed those concerns...". Having passed the North Dakota House of Representatives on February 26, 2013, House Bill No. 1446 was defeated by a vote of 16 yeas and 31 nays in the North Dakota Senate.

=== 2014 ===
- Alaska in which House Bill No. 284 was introduced ("An Act relating to an interstate compact on a balanced federal budget"); as well as Senate Bill No. 203 ("An Act relating to an interstate compact on a balanced federal budget") H.B. No. 284 was approved by the Alaska House of Representatives on March 19, 2014, with a vote of 22 yeas and 12 nays; H.B. No. 284 was then approved by the Alaska Senate on April 17, 2014, with a vote of 14 yeas and 6 nays; H.B. No. 284 was signed into law by the Governor of Alaska on April 23, 2014;
- Arizona in which House Bill No. 2305 was introduced ("Amending Title 41, Chapter 2.1, Arizona Revised Statutes, by adding Article 2; relating to the compact regarding a Balanced Budget Amendment under Article V of the United States Constitution") on March 6, 2014, H.B. No. 2305 was approved by the Arizona House of Representatives with a vote of 32 yeas and 26 nays; the bill then died in the Arizona Senate;
- Georgia in which House Bill No. 794 was introduced ("To amend Title 50 of the Official Code of Georgia Annotated, relating to state government, so as to adopt the Compact for a Balanced Budget and promote the proposal and ratification of a balanced budget amendment to the United States Constitution; to provide for powers, duties, and procedures relative to the Compact; to provide for related matters; to provide an effective date; to repeal conflicting laws; and for other purposes"); H.B. No. 794 was approved by the Georgia House of Representatives on February 20, 2014, with a vote of 103 yeas, 63 nays, and 5 not voting; on March 18, 2014, H.B. No. 794 was approved by the Georgia Senate by a vote of 30 yeas and 25 nays; H.B. No. 794 was signed into law by Georgia's Governor on April 12, 2014; as well as Senate Bill No. 206 ("...to amend Chapter 6 of Title 28 of the Official Code of Georgia Annotated, relative to interstate cooperation, so as to provide for delegations from the State of Georgia to certain conventions called by the Congress of the United States for proposing amendments to the Constitution of the United States pursuant to Article V of said Constitution; to provide an effective date; to repeal conflicting laws; and for other purposes.") which was approved by the Georgia Senate on March 7, 2013; the Georgia House of Representatives approved the bill nearly a full year later on February 20, 2014, with a vote of 102 yeas, 68 nays, and 3 not voting; S.B. No. 206 was signed into law by Georgia's Governor on April 29, 2014;
- North Carolina in which House Resolution No. 1206 was introduced ("A House Resolution Establishing a House Select Committee to Study the Issue of Federalism and Abuses of Federal Authority, Including Whether North Carolina Should Apply to Congress for a Convention of the States Under Article V of the Constitution of the United States") which was withdrawn from the calendar of the North Carolina House of Representatives on June 25, 2014, and then re-referred to the Committee on Rules, Calendar, and Operations of the House that same day; and
- Oklahoma in which House Joint Resolution No. 1090 was introduced ("A Joint Resolution ratifying the Compact for America; stating declaration of policy purpose and intent; defining terms; providing for Compact membership and withdrawal; establishing a Compact Commission; stating duties and authority; providing for appointment of a Compact Administrator; providing for composition of the Commission; providing for funding; providing powers and duties of the Compact Administrator; requiring certain notice; providing for enforcement of Compact; providing for dissolution of the Commission and discharge of the Compact Administrator and members; providing effective date of Article IV of Compact; providing resolution applying for a Convention for proposing amendments to the United States Constitution; providing for delegate appointment, limitations and instructions; providing for recall; providing an oath; providing term of delegates; providing delegate authority; providing that violation of Compact requires delegate to forfeit appointment; providing for payment of delegate expenses; providing Convention rules; providing date and location of Convention; providing agenda for the Convention; providing procedure for delegate recognition; providing procedure for voting; designating a quorum; providing procedure for actions by the Convention; providing for transmittal of approved Balanced Budget Amendment; requiring open records and proceedings; providing for adjournment; providing prohibitions; providing ratification process; providing for construction, enforcement, venue, and severability; and providing effective date of Compact").

=== 2015 ===
- Alabama in which Senate Bill No. 414 was offered ("To adopt the Compact for a Balanced Budget; to facilitate the calling of an Article V constitutional convention with the intent of amending the United States Constitution to include a balanced budget requirement for Congress; to provide for membership and withdrawal of compact members; to establish a Compact Commission; to provide procedures for applying for an Article V constitutional convention; to specify qualifications and duties of convention delegates; to establish rules for the convention; and to provide for the venue of the convention") which was approved on May 28, 2015, by the Alabama Senate; and while favorably reported out of the Committee on Constitution, Campaigns and Elections of the Alabama House of Representatives, S.B. No. 414 was never put to a vote of the full Alabama House of Representatives and, thus, died in the "lower" chamber; also introduced in 2015 were House Bill No. 42, House Bill No. 379 and Senate Bill No. 10, all three of which ended up "indefinitely postponed" in their chamber of origin;
- Arizona in which House Bill No. 2326 was offered ("Amending Title 41, Chapter 2.1, Arizona Revised Statutes, by adding Article 2; relating to the Compact Regarding a Balanced Budget Amendment under Article V of the United States Constitution") which was approved by the Arizona House of Representatives on February 24, 2015; the bill was then referred to the Rules Committee in the Arizona Senate where it died;

=== 2016 ===
- Arizona in which House Bill No. 2457 was offered ("Amending Title 41, Chapter 2.1, Arizona Revised Statutes, by adding Article 2; relating to the Compact Regarding a Balanced Budget Amendment under Article V of the United States Constitution") which was approved by the Arizona House of Representatives on February 18, 2016; the bill was then referred to the Rules Committee in the Arizona Senate where it died;

At the Federal level, House Concurrent Resolution No. 26 was introduced in the 114th Congress by U.S. Representative Paul Gosar of Arizona ("Effectuating the Compact for a Balanced Budget"). H.Con.Res. 26 has received no further consideration than to be referred to the Committee on the Judiciary in the U.S. House of Representatives on March 19, 2015.

== Congressional maintenance of Article V applications and rescissions ==
One issue of concern over the years has been official receipt by Congress of the applications, and of the rescissions, approved by state lawmakers. In some instances, the process went very smoothly with Congress—particularly the Senate—expeditiously providing readers of the Congressional Record with the full verbatim texts of such applications, or rescissions, which were then referred to committee. But in other cases, retransmitting to Congress the state legislative documents—in some instances multiple times—was necessary for those state documents to finally be entered word-for-word into the Congressional Record. South Carolina's above-mentioned H. 3400—approved in 2004—would be a prime example. It took nearly a full decade for that resolution of rescission to be entered into the Congressional Record and to be referred to the Committee on the Judiciary in both the U.S. Senate and U.S. House of Representatives. Virginia's 2004 House Joint Resolution No. 194 was similarly situated.

As an outgrowth of that frustration, on March 18, 2014, Senate Joint Memorial No. 104 was approved by the Idaho Legislature calling upon Congress to "...maintain a record of the Article V applications of the states in a form that is open and accessible to the people of the United States." On May 15, 2014, Idaho's S.J.M. No. 104 was designated as "POM-231"; was referred to the U.S. Senate's Committee on the Judiciary; and was published verbatim in the U.S. Senate's portion of the Congressional Record.

== See also ==
List of state applications for an Article V Convention
