= A More Perfect Constitution =

2007 book by Larry Sabato

- The cover of A More Perfect Constitution
- Author: Larry Sabato
- Language: English
- Genre: Nonfiction
- Publisher: Walker & Company
- Publication date: October 2, 2007
- Publication place: United States
- Media type: Print (Hardback)
- Pages: 352
- ISBN: 978-0-8027-1621-7

A More Perfect Constitution is a book published by American political scientist at the University of Virginia, Larry J. Sabato, in which he proposes a constitutional convention to substantially overhaul the United States Constitution. He points out that after the Bill of Rights, there have only been seventeen constitutional amendments over the past 220 years. He argues that a constitutional convention is overdue and is something that the Founding Fathers would have wanted. He offers 23 proposals for revising the Constitution.

== Sabato's proposals ==
The twenty-three proposals run the gamut from changing the length of the U.S. President's term in office and the number and terms of Supreme Court justices to altering the structure of Congress, modifying the Electoral College, and introducing national service. Each of his proposals could be implemented with concurrence of 2/3 of each house of Congress and 3/4 of the states, except for the proposal to give some states more Senators than others. That proposal would require concurrence from every state, or amending the amending formula itself and subsequently amending the constitution to provide for the change in the structure of the Senate.

His senate reform proposal was intended to correct what he argued was an imbalance in legislative power in the U.S. Senate, where there is equal representation for all states regardless of population.

To address this issue while preserving the Senate's fundamental principles, Sabato proposed adjusting seat allocation based on population size. Specifically, the ten largest states would receive two extra seats each, the next fifteen largest would gain one seat, and the smallest 25 states would keep their current two seats. This new 135-member Senate would be reapportioned every decade following the census, allowing for shifts in representation as state populations change.

== See also ==
- Criticism of the United States Constitution
- Lawrence Lessig, prominent scholar advocating for a new constitution
- Reform of the Senate
