= Political quietism in Islam =

Islamic withdrawal from politics

In the context of political thought or politics and the religion of Islam, political quietism has been used to refer to the religiously-motivated withdrawal from political affairs. It is in contrast to political Islam, which holds that the Islamic religion and politics are inseparable, and Muslims should be striving to establish governance through an Islamic framework.

Motivations include the belief that it is not for Muslim public to question authorities and that they should instead focus on piety, prayer, religious rituals and personal virtue; skepticism that mere mortals can establish a true Islamic government. Quietism may also be temporary, such as the belief that it is "forbidden to rebel against a [Muslim] ruler", or even become involved in political factions, as this would cause disunity in the community, but that at the right time in the future, when (depending on the sect of Muslim), a consensus of Islamic scholars (in Sunni Islam), or the twelfth imam (in Twelver Shia Islam) call for it, all Muslims should support a true Islamic government. (The Sunnis of Saudi Arabia and Salafis are sometimes described as having "quietist" and "radical" wings.)

== Explanation for religious differences ==
According to the Western scholar Bernard Lewis, quietism is contrasted with "activist" Islam:

There are in particular two political traditions, one of which might be called quietist, the other activist. The arguments in favour of both are based, as are most early Islamic arguments, on the Holy Book and on the actions and sayings of the Prophet. The quietist tradition obviously rests on the Prophet as sovereign, as judge and statesman. But before the Prophet became a head of state, he was a rebel. Before he traveled from Mecca to Medina, where he became sovereign, he was an opponent of the existing order. He led an opposition against the pagan oligarchy of Mecca and at a certain point went into exile and formed what in modern language might be called a "government in exile," with which finally he was able to return in triumph to his birthplace and establish the Islamic state in Mecca...The Prophet as rebel has provided a sort of paradigm of revolution—opposition and rejection, withdrawal and departure, exile and return. Time and time again movements of opposition in Islamic history tried to repeat this pattern.

== Support for Quietism ==
Some analysts have argued that "Islamic political culture promotes political quietism", especially when faced with forms of absolute leadership, such as autocracy, monarchy, or caliphate. Some well known admonitions in Islamic history in support of Quietism from the Quran, hadith, and Islamic scholars include:

=== Aphorisms ===
The saying

- 'Better one hundred years of the Sultan's tyranny than one year of people's tyranny over each other.'"

Similar sayings include

- Better a century of tyranny than one day of chaos. (Ibn Taymiyyah)
- "The world can live with tyranny but not with anarchy".

Another "commonly cited" but not scriptural sayings among Sunni jurists and theologians that encourage acceptance over resistance include

- "Whose power prevails must be obeyed"

=== Scripture ===
- 'Obey God, obey his Prophet and obey those among you who hold authority'(Q4:59)
- "Listen and obey,
  - even if the one appointed over you is an Ethiopian slave with a head like a raisin. (Hadith of Sunan Ibn Majah)
  - even if the one appointed over you is a mutilated Ethiopian slave whose nose and ears have been cut off, listen to him and obey, so long as he leads you according to the Book of Allah." (Hadith of Sunan Ibn Majah)

=== Medieval ===
According to Saud al-Sarhan, in medieval times when the power of authorities in the Muslim empire became absolute, quietism was considered a virtue, and a genre of Islamic advice literature (aka Nasihat) arose championing a pragmatic strategy of showing support and obedience to political authority within the realm, while subtly calling for equitable and sound governance. Al-Sarhan also states that 12th century Persian authorship attempted to combine political activism with recognition of divinely sanctioned absolutism of the caliphs.

=== Muhammad Sayyid Tantawy ===
Egyptian mufti Muhammad Sayyid Tantawy argued (Note: in an interview in 1988 arguing among other things.) that the traditional Islamic duty of hisbah (forbidding wrong and commanding right) when administered by "the hand" (instead of "by the word" or by silence) in the larger society, was reserved for the authorities.

== Quietism among Salafists ==
Contrasting the Salafi quietists with the doctrines of Salafi-Jihadist organizations that wage armed insurgencies, (such as al-Qaeda, Islamic State, Boko Haram, etc.) the Western journalist Graeme Wood notes that while both believe that God’s law is the only law and are "committed" to expanding the Dar al-Islam (the land of Islam), Salafi quietists share other quietist Muslims' concern about disunity in the Muslim community (Ummah). Wood quotes a Salafi preacher as saying: "The Prophet said: as long as the ruler does not enter into clear kufr [disbelief], give him general obedience," even if he is a sinner. Classic "books of creed" all warn against causing social upheaval. Wood describes these quietists as believing "Muslims should direct their energies toward perfecting their personal life, including prayer, ritual, and hygiene," rather than jihad and conquest. He compares the "inordinate amount of time" spent on debating issues such as the proper length of trousers and whether beards may be trimmed in some areas, to ultra-Orthodox Jews who "debate whether it’s kosher to tear off squares of toilet paper on the Sabbath (does that count as 'rending cloth'?)" Sidney Jones of ICG has stated that the discouraging of political activism in (quietist) Salafism served as a barrier to the expansion of jihadist activities to varying degrees.

Western scholar Joas Wagemakers describes Salafist quietists as focusing "on the propagation of their message (da'wah) through lessons, sermons, and other missionary activities and stay[ing] away from politics and violence, which they leave to the ruler." Another Western scholar—Quintan Wiktorowicz—uses the term purist to describe Salafists who sound similar (according to Jacob Olidort) to what Wagemakers describes as quietist: "they emphasize a focus on nonviolent methods of propagation, purification and education. They view politics as a diversion that encourages deviancy."

Western scholar Jacob Olidort describes the Salafi scholar Muhammad Nasiruddin al-Albani (d. 1999) as "the most prominent quietist Salafist of the last century". His slogan "later in life" was: "the best policy is to stay out of politics." Today, his students range from Madkhalis—which Olidort describes as the "absolute quietists"—to the violent Ikhwan insurgents that planned and perpetrated the siege of Mecca in 1979. Olidort argues that quietist is "an inadequate label to describe the ambitions of Albani and his followers".

Commenting on the activities of certain Islamist groups that organized armed rebellions against Arab rulers, Muhammad ibn Saalih al-Uthaymeen, one of the most influential Islamic scholars of his era, stated in a fatwa:

"A factor that hinders from Takfîr shouldn’t exist when a person performs a disbelieving deed [I.e. if we are to do Takfîr]... The disbelief has to be clear and known and it shouldn’t be possible to misunderstand it. If one can misunderstand it, then one doesn’t do Takfîr on the person who falls into it (this deed) even if the deed is disbelief.. It was nothing other than this unsound misinterpretation that made the rebellion of the Khawârij harm the Islâmic Ummah. Khawârij get the idea that the deed is disbelief and (thusly) they revolt, which they said to ‘Alî bin Abî Tâlib... Those you accuse among the Arab and Muslim rulers can be excused. They have perhaps not received the truth. They maybe have received it while at the same time somebody made them misunderstand the matter. Thus, one has to be sensible when it comes to this matter."

=== Divisions among Salafists ===
Modern Salafi movements such as the Muslim Brotherhood, which was founded in Egypt in the 1920s, co-opted the Sufi tradition of ‘uzla' or retreat from worldly affairs and political quietism as a form of "soft jihad" against fellow Muslims. Sayyid Qutb could be said to have founded the actual movement of Salafi-Jihadism. He was a prominent leader of the Muslim Brotherhood and a highly influential Islamist ideologue, and the first to articulate these anathemizing principles in his magnum opus Fī ẓilāl al-Qurʾān (In the shade of the Qurʾān) and his 1966 manifesto Maʿālim fīl-ṭarīq (Milestones), which lead to his execution by the Egyptian government. Other Salafi movements in the Middle East and North Africa and across the Muslim world adopted many of his Islamist principles. According to Qutb, the Muslim community has been extinct for several centuries and reverted to jahiliyah (the pre-Islamic age of ignorance) because those who call themselves Muslims have failed to follow the sharia law. In order to restore Islam, bring back its days of glory, and free the Muslims from the clasps of ignorance, Qutb proposed the shunning of modern society, establishing a vanguard modeled after the early Muslims, preaching, and bracing oneself for poverty or even death as preparation for jihad against what he perceived as jahili government/society, and overthrow them. Qutbism, the radical Islamist ideology derived from the ideas of Qutb, was denounced by many prominent Muslim scholars as well as other members of the Muslim Brotherhood, like Yusuf al-Qaradawi.

== Quietism within Sufism ==
The ethics of some of the companions of Muhammad, who became paradigms of what can be called an early Sunni isolationism, were later adopted by Muslim ascetical groups, who would be later known as the Sufis. However, unlike the early companions, who demarcated reclusion from un-Islamic practices such as monasticism and cleared it from any suggestion of divisiveness, there were those amongst the Sufis who regarded "ascetic seclusion alone as the means of attaining goodness". In addition, some of the companions interpreted these prophetic and Qur’anic recommendations figuratively. Al-Hakim al-Tirmidhi (750-869 CE), a Sunni jurist and one of the great early authors of Sufism, discusses a report attributed to the companion and first caliph Abū Bakr al-Ṣiddīq where the latter defines ‘uzla or retreat in the bodily sense as a synonym for monasticism. Al-Tirmidhi makes a rhetorical body shunning/heart-shunning dichotomy between Christians and Jews, who shunned the world with their bodies, and Muslims, who shunned the world with their hearts in order to conquer their egos. This resulted in a debate within the Sufi movement about what form asceticism should take, with enlightened Sufis arguing in favour of shunning the world with one’s heart, since morality is to be conceived in a social context and the true saint should be the one who participates in the social and economic life of the society. After the death of Muhammad and the assassinations of the rightly guided caliphs, Sufis deemed attempts at perfecting this world useless and thus "took the Qur’anic concept of tawakkul (reliance on God) and developed it into political quietism."

Javad Nurbakhsh stated: "In Sufi practice, quietism and seclusion – sitting in isolation, occupying oneself day and night in devotions – are condemned." Sufis should have "active professional lives", and be in "service to the creation", i.e. be actively serving in the world giving "generously to aid others". However, in the past some Sufi masters have "retired from mainstream society in order to avoid harassment by mobs incited by hostile clerics who had branded all Sufis as unbelievers and heretics". On the other hand, Inayat Khan affirmed that "Sufism is the ancient school of wisdom, of quietism, and it has been the origin of many cults of a mystical and philosophical nature." Scholar Nikki Keddie also states that traditionally Sufis were "generally noted more for political quietism than for activism found in the sects".

== Quietism in Shia Islam ==
In Twelver Shia Islam, religious leaders who have been described as "quietist" include;

- Ayatollah Muhammad Hossein Naini, a leader during Iran's 1906 Constitutional revolution;
- Ayatollah Seyyed Hossein Borujerdi, the prominent marja from Iran from 1947 to his death in 1961;
- Ayatollah Muhsin al-Hakim, the prominent marja from Iraq from 1961 to his death in 1970;
- Ayatollah Abu al-Qasim al-Khoei, the prominent marja from Iraq from 1970 to his death in 1992;
- Ayatollah Ali al-Sistani, currently one of, if not the leading Shia clerics from Iraq.
- Nearly all of Shia scholars of the Najaf hawza in Iraq are considered "quietist".

Their stance is not a complete withdrawal from politics, since they affirm that a "true Islamic government" cannot be established until the return of the twelfth Imam. Until this time, Muslims must "search for the best form of government", advising rulers to ensure that "laws inimical to sharia" are not implemented. However, others (for example, Ali al-Sistani) advise a pluralistic, democratic system of government until the return of the Mahdi. Their "quietism" is justified by the notion that humans are prone to errors or corruption, therefore no mortal human can ever establish a just, Islamic rule on Earth. Therefore, many of them oppose the Iranian "non-quietist" concept of Guardianship of the Islamic Jurist.

== Quietism and historians ==
At least one historian (Jebran Chamieh) argues the Islamic belief that includes what type of government is best and Muslims should establish, is not supported by what is known about the preaching and life of Muhammad.

"Guided by the conduct of the Prophet, we find that he exercised the executive power but did not form a government; he was the administrator but did not establish an administrative system; he was the supreme judge but did not create a judicial system or procedure; he was the military commander but did not organize an army; and he controlled the finances and revenues but did not have a budget. Moreover, the Prophet had ample time before his death to organize the Moslem community politically. The most pressing measure was to establish a system for the legal transmission of power. He was aware of the rivalry among his followers over the succession and could have delegated his authority to prevent dissensions among them. But he did not. These observations lend credence to those who argue that the Prophet never intended to form a state and that his mission was purely religious."

Chamieh also points out that this practice (or lack thereof) was followed by the Rashidun caliphate, who never established a "police force to keep law and order". When "the rebels attacked Caliph Othman in his house and assassinated him, no security measures were available to protect him. The caliphs did not establish an administration, a fiscal system, or a budget ... In the conquered lands, they retained the previous Byzantine and Persian administrative systems and kept the local employees to administer the country."

== See also ==
- Anti-democracy
- Anti-politics
- Apoliticism
- Quietism (Christian contemplation)
- Quietism (disambiguation)
- Quietism (philosophy)
- Non-politics
- Political alienation
- Political apathy
- Political aspects of Islam
- Religion in politics
- Religious rejection of politics
- Sabr
