= United States Congress and citizens =

United States Congress and citizens describes the relation between the public and lawmakers. Essentially, American citizens elect Representatives every two years and Senators every 6 years who have the duty to represent their interests in the United States Congress, the national legislature of the United States. All congressional officials try to serve two distinct purposes which sometimes overlap––representing their constituents (local concerns) and making laws for the nation (national concerns). There has been debate throughout American history about how to straddle these dual obligations of representing the wishes of citizens while at the same time trying to keep mindful of the needs of the entire nation. Often, compromise is required. The ombudsman like non-legislative duties of Congressmembers, Senators, and their Staff is known as Constituent Services or Constituent Services in the United States.

== Challenges of reelection ==
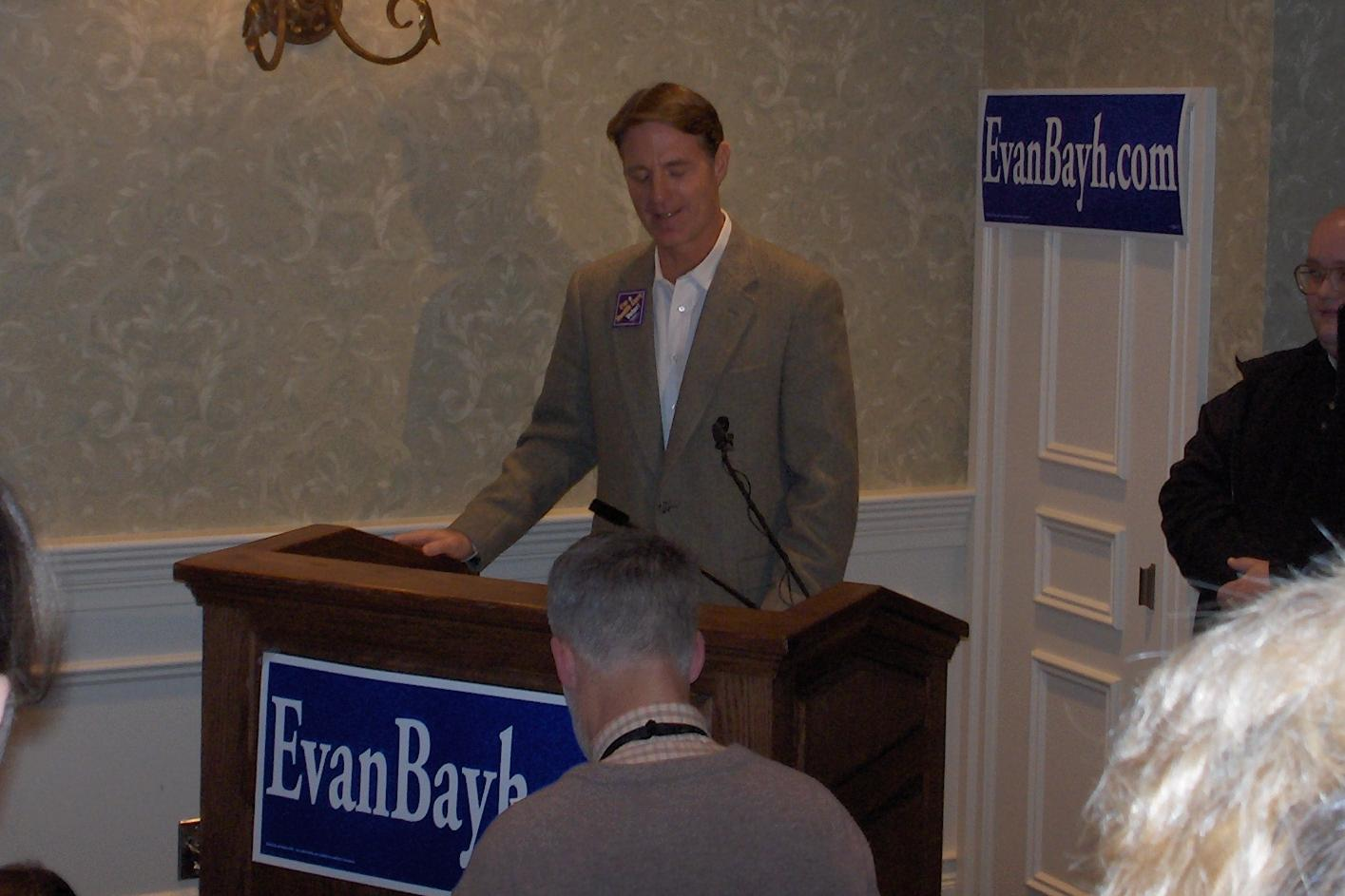
Candidate Evan Bayh speaking to voters in a reelection bid in 2006.

Every two years a congressperson faces reelection, and as a result there is a strong tendency for a congressperson seeking reelection to focus their publicity efforts at their home districts. Running for re-election can be a grueling process of distant travel, fund-raising, which prevents representatives from paying attention to governing, according to some critics. University of Virginia professor Larry Sabato, author of A More Perfect Constitution, proposed an amendment to organize primaries to prevent a "frontloaded calendar" long before the election to prevent a "race by states to the front of the primary pack," which subverts the national interest, in his view. After each ten year census, states are allocated representatives based on population, and states can choose how to draw the congressional district boundaries. A law in 1967 abolished all at-large elections (when representatives are chosen by voters in the entire state rather than an electoral district) except in less populous states entitled to only one Representative.

Nevertheless, congresspersons in office, or incumbents, have strong advantages over challengers. One reporter noted "nearly all incumbents raise far more (money) than do their challengers," which brings a huge advantage to incumbents. Incumbents get the majority of PAC money according to the logic that "PACs give most of their money to incumbents because they are more likely to win; incumbents win largely because PACs heavily finance them." There is consensus among political analysts that money is important for winning elections. "Election to Congress ... is therefore like getting life tenure at a university," wrote one critic. In 1986, of 469 House and Senate elections, only 12 challengers succeeded in defeating incumbents. Most challengers are at a huge disadvantage in terms of fundraising.

How does gerrymandering work? If congressional districts are drawn fairly (left) then races are competitive; red dots (representing Republicans) and blue dots (Democrats) are split evenly with 16 voters in each district, and neither Republicans nor Democrats have an advantage. But by redrawing congressional districts creatively (right), it's possible to rig elections so that one party has a huge advantage. In this case, Democrats are likely to win three seats while Republicans only one.

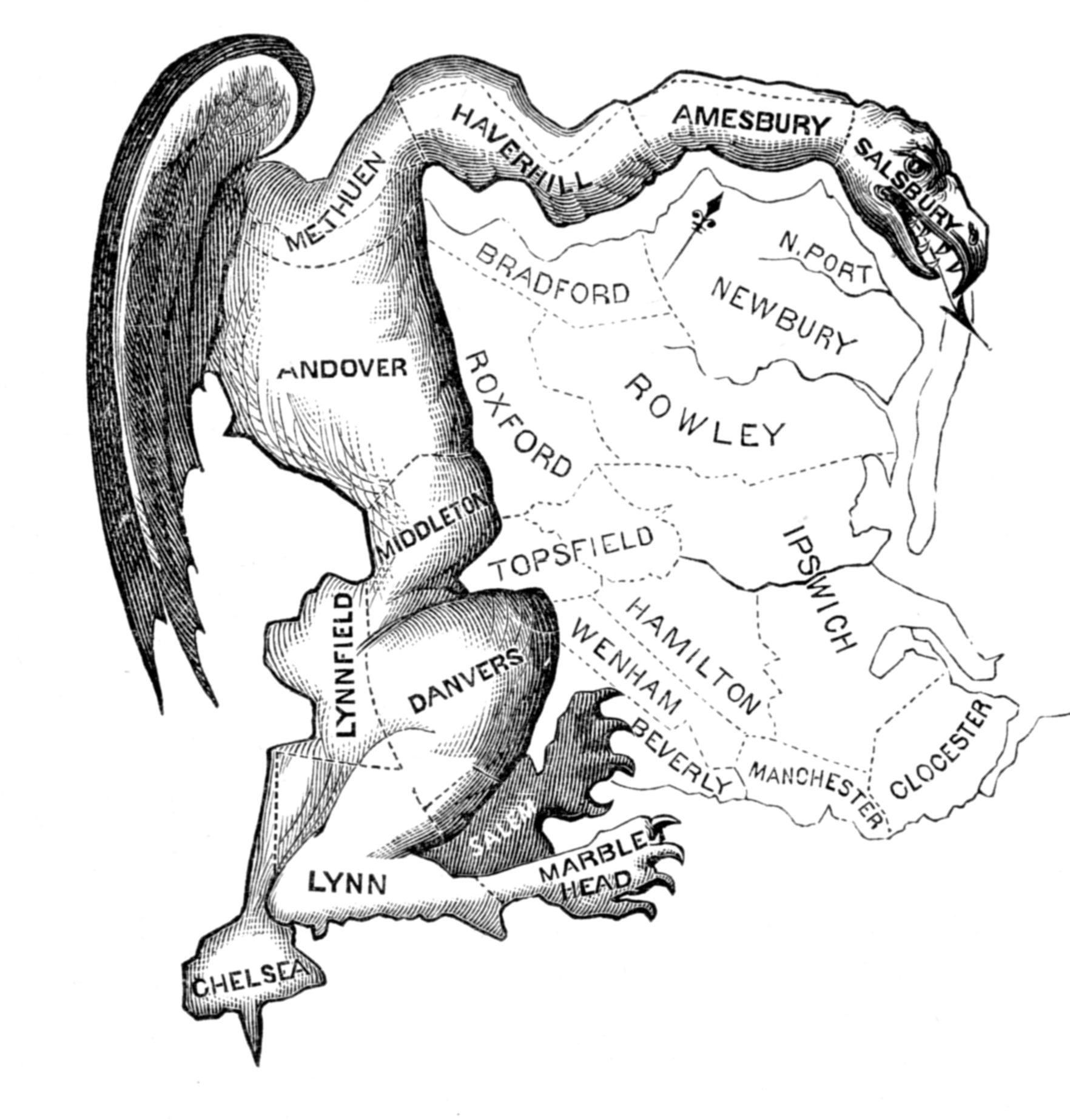
Here is the original cartoon "The Gerry-Mander" leading to the coining of the term Gerrymander. District boundaries were creatively drawn by the Massachusetts legislature to favor the incumbent Democratic-Republican party candidates of Governor Elbridge Gerry over the Federalists in 1812.

Advantages which incumbents enjoy over challengers, and which have been a source of criticism and controversy, are access to campaign contributions as well as gerrymandering which give incumbents an unfair advantage, according to some critics. As a result, re-election rates of members of Congress seeking repeated terms hovers around 90% according to many sources. Sometimes members of Congress are seen as a "privileged class" with cozy relations with lobbyists and free use of official resources. Academics such as Princeton's Stephen Macedo have proposed solutions to fix gerrymandering. Campaign costs have risen steadily over time. In 1971, the cost of running for congress in Utah was $70,000. Since then, campaign costs have climbed. The biggest campaign expense is television ads, although campaign staff and materials are expensive too. By 1986, the average Senate race cost $3 million; average House races cost $350,000. By 1994, the cost to run for a congressional seat was about $500,000 on average; in 2004, a decade later, the cost was significantly higher. "Largely because of the ever-increasing cost of television advertising, the average price tag for waging a winning campaign is likely to zoom past the million-dollar mark this year for the first time, analysts say," according to one report. Money plays a huge role in congressional elections. Since fundraising is vital, "members of Congress are forced to spend ever-increasing hours raising money for their re-election" and "campaign costs continue to skyrocket." Nevertheless, the Supreme Court has treated campaign contributions as a free speech issue. Some see money as a good influence in politics since it "enables candidates to communicate with voters and parties to organize efforts to get out the vote." In the 2008 election, spending for all campaigns (including presidential) approached $2 billion in early 2008. Few members retire from Congress without complaining about how much it costs to campaign for reelection. Further, after being reelected, congresspersons are more likely to attend to the needs of heavy campaign contributors than to ordinary citizens. Some political scientists speculate there is a coattail effect when a popular president or party position has the effect of reelecting incumbents who get dragged along to victory as if they were "riding on the president's coattails", although there is some evidence that the coattail effect is irregular and possibly has been declining since the 1950s.

To be reelected, congresspersons must advertise heavily on television; unfortunately, this almost always requires so-called negative advertising which is considered by political operatives as necessary. Critics often point to attack ads that smear an opponent's reputation or make unfounded accusations without discussing issues as being unpopular with the public. The consensus is that negative advertising is effective since "the messages tend to stick." Attack ads are prevalent in most Congressional races today. Critics charge that candidates must spend heavily to get elected and races often cost millions of dollars. In recent years, the average victor in a Senate race spent close to $7 million, and the average House victor spent over a million dollars. Some districts are so heavily Democratic or Republican that they are called a safe seat; any candidate winning the primary will almost always be elected, and don't need to spend money on advertising. When a Congressional seat becomes vacant, then both parties may spend heavily on advertising in these so-called "competitive races"; in California in 1992, only four of twenty races for House seats were considered "highly competitive".

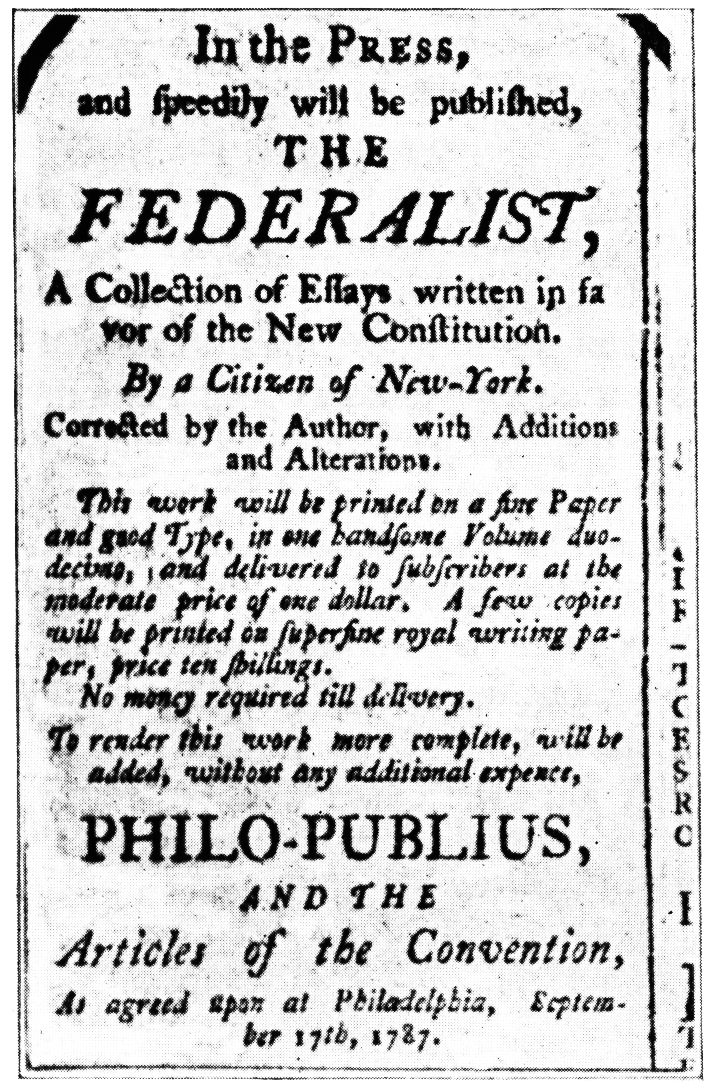
The Federalist Papers presented arguments in favor of a strong connection between citizens and their congressional representatives.

So why is there such apathy on the part of voters, particularly towards Congress? Prominent Founding Fathers writing in the Federalist Papers believed it was "essential to liberty that the government in general should have a common interest with the people," and felt that a bond between the people and the representatives was "particularly essential." They wrote "frequent elections are unquestionably the only policy by which this dependence and sympathy can be effectually secured." In 2009, however, few Americans were familiar with leaders of Congress. Numerous reports suggest voter apathy is widespread and growing.

The close presidential election between Barack Obama and John McCain in 2008 brought more people to the polls (reversing a trend); overall, the proportion of eligible voters who do, in fact, vote has been falling since 1960.

The percentage of Americans eligible to vote who did, in fact, vote was 63% in 1960, but has been falling since. Public opinion polls asking people if they approve of the job Congress is doing have, in the last few decades, generally been low. Approval ratings in December 2007 were 25%, meaning only 1 out of 4 Americans approved of Congress. Approval ratings from 1974 to 2009 have varied within a range from 20% to 50%, with variation, with a spike of over 84% in October 2001 after the 9/11 attacks. From 2006 to 2009, ratings have hovered in the 25% range, with a high of 37% in early 2007, and an all-time low of 14% in late 2008. Vanderbilt professor Dana D. Nelson in Bad for Democracy argues that all citizens seem to do, politically, is vote for president every four years, and not much else; they've abandoned politics. Apathy was lower in the 2008 election, which featured a competitive election for president. However, voter turnout in 2008 (62%) was the highest since 1968.

Why explains public attitudes towards Congress? Scholar Julian E. Zeliger suggested that the "size, messiness, virtues, and vices that make Congress so interesting also create enormous barriers to our understanding the institution ... unlike the presidency, Congress is difficult to conceptualize." And scholars Steven S. Smith, Jason M. Roberts, and Ryan J. Vander Wielen suggest that despite the criticism, "Congress is a remarkably resilient institution ... its place in the political process is not threatened ... it is rich in resources." They contend that "Congress is easy to dislike and often difficult to defend." Many challengers running for Congress run against Congress which is an "old form of American politics" which further undermines Congress's reputation with the public as a whole. They write:

The rough-and-tumble world of legislating is not orderly and civil, human frailties too often taint its membership, and legislative outcomes are often frustrating and ineffective ... Still, we are not exaggerating when we say that Congress is essential to American democracy. We would not have survived as a nation without a Congress that represented the diverse interests of our society, conducted a public debate on the major issues, found compromises to resolve conflicts peacefully, and limited the power of our executive, military, and judicial institutions ... The popularity of Congress ebbs and flows with the public's confidence in government generally ... the legislative process is easy to dislike––it often generates political posturing and grandstanding, it necessarily involves compromise, and it often leaves broken promises in its trail. Also, members of Congress often appear self-serving as they pursue their political careers and represent interests and reflect values that are controversial. Scandals, even when they involve a single member, add to the public's frustration with Congress and have contributed to the institution's low ratings in opinion polls.

But political scientists believe that the large majority of today's members behave ethically.

An additional factor which confounds perceptions of Congress is that the "issues facing Congress are becoming more technical and complex," according to one source. They require expertise in areas such as science, engineering, and economics. As a result, Congress often cedes authority to experts at the executive branch, although this can enhance the executive branch's power over the details of public policy. When Congress deals with complex issues, complex unwieldy bills can result. Political scientists have noted how a prolonged period marked by narrow majorities in both chambers of Congress has affected partisanship. There is speculation that the alternating control of Congress between Democrats and Republicans will lead to greater flexibility in policies, more pragmatic choices, and greater civility within the institution, and possibly greater public support. There is hope that this will be an improvement from the partisanship of the past few decades.

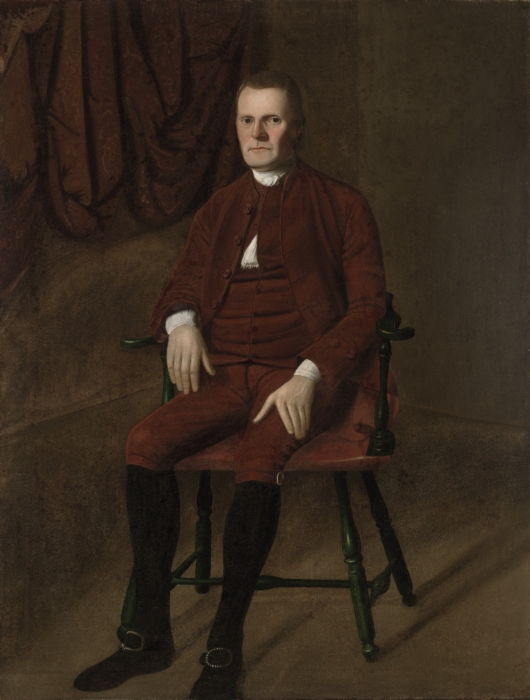
Roger Sherman offered what came to be known as the Connecticut Compromise in which the people would be represented by proportional representation in the House of Representatives and states represented in the Senate.

== Smaller states and bigger states ==
When the Constitution was ratified in 1787, the ratio of the populations of large states to small states was roughly twelve–to–one. The Connecticut Compromise gave every state, large and small, an equal vote in the Senate. Since each state has two senators, residents of smaller states have more clout in the Senate than residents of larger states. But since 1787, the population disparity between large and small states has grown; in 2006, for example, California had seventy times the population of Wyoming. Critics have charged that the population disparity works against residents of large states. University of Texas law professor Sanford Levinson criticizes the imbalance of power in the Senate as causing a steady redistribution of resources from blue states to red states and from "large states to small states." University of Kentucky professor Richard Labunski agrees that small states have an unfair advantage in the Senate, writing: "If the 26 least populated states voted as a bloc, they would control the U.S. Senate with a total of just under 17% of the country’s population." However, others argue that the Connecticut compromise was deliberately intended by the Framers to construct the Senate so that each state had equal footing not based on population, and contend that the result works well on balance.

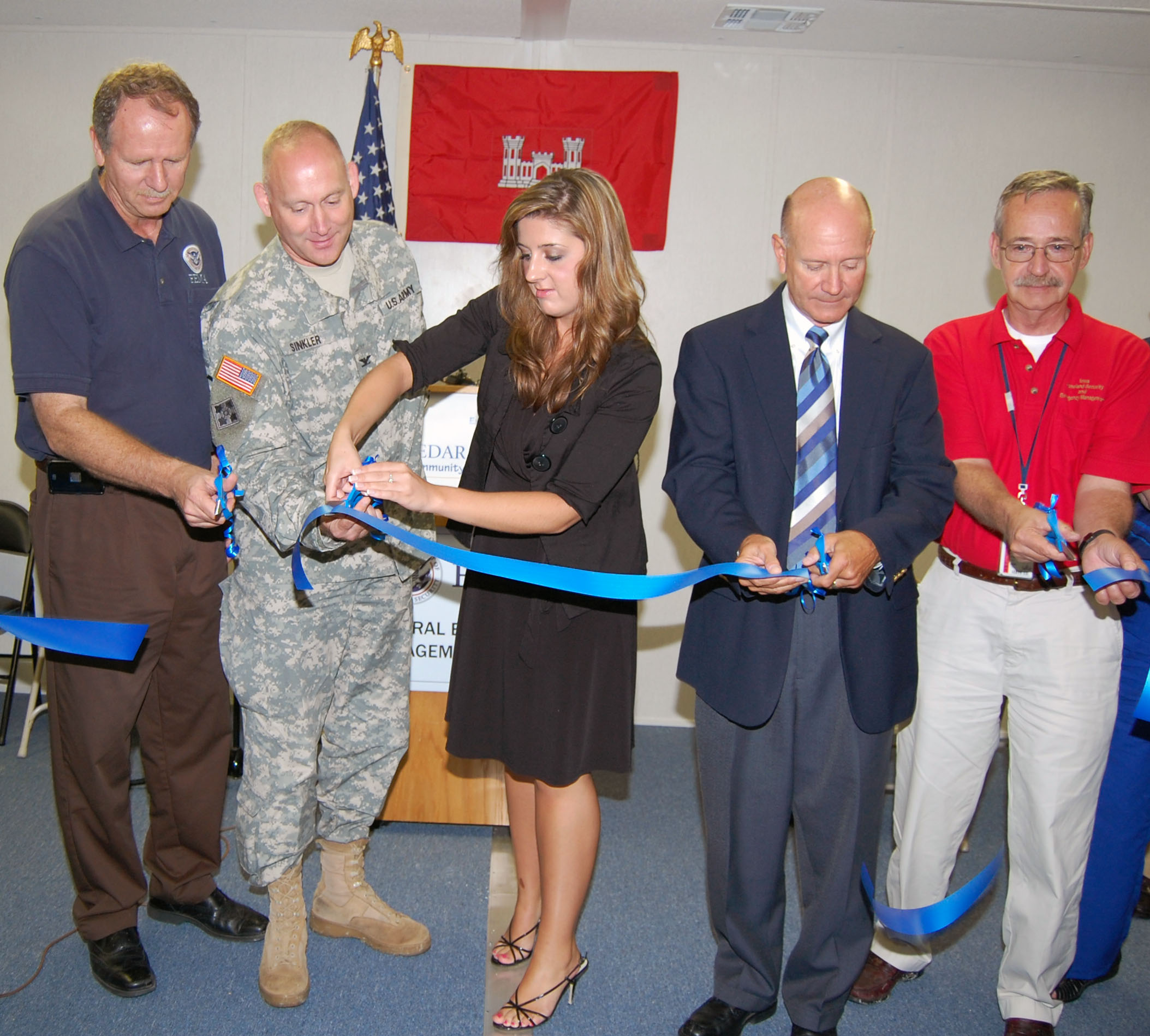
Congresspersons often provide constituent services to people in their district. Sometimes this involves attending local meetings or events. In the photo, people celebrate the opening of an educational center in Iowa. Congressperson Dave Loebsack sent assistant Jessica Moeller (center) to represent him in this ceremony.

== Congresspersons and constituents ==
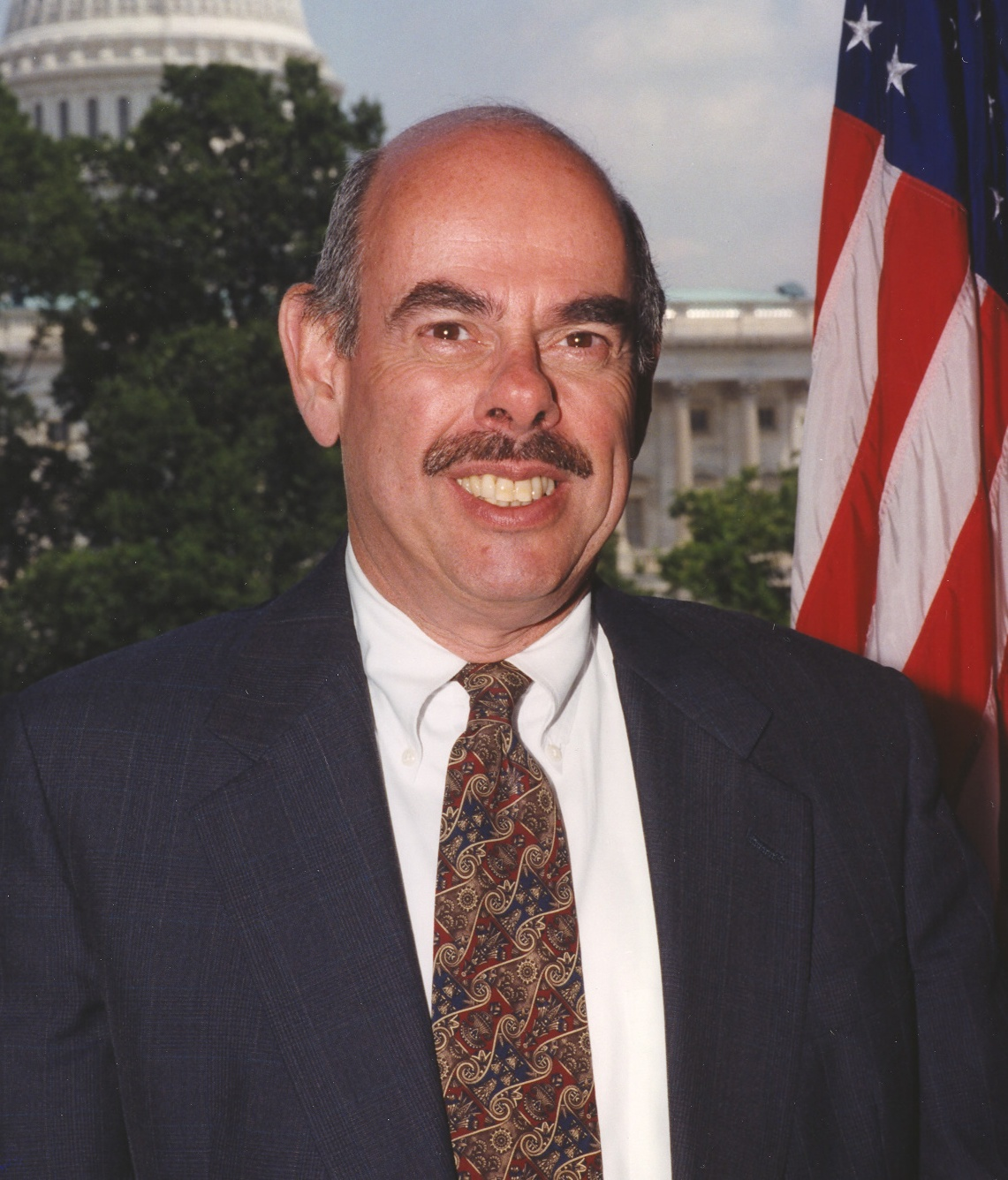
Congressperson Henry Waxman has built a reputation for good public policy; according to Richard Fenno's classification, he would be the second type of congressperson.

A major aspect of the role for a Senator and a representative consists of services to his or her constituency. Members receive thousands of letters, phone calls, and e-mails, with some expressing opinion on an issue, or displeasure with a member's position or vote. Often the incoming messages are not from concerned citizens but are barrages of electronic mail and interactive video designed to pressure the congressperson and his or her staff. Constituents request assistance with particular problems or ask questions. Members of Congress want to leave a positive impression on the constituent, rather than leave them disgruntled. Thus, their offices will often be responsive, and go out of their way to help steer the citizen through the intricacies of the bureaucracy. In this role, members and their staffers act as an ombudsman at the Federal level. This unofficial job has become increasingly time-consuming, and has significantly reduced the time that members have for the preparation or inspection of bills. Providing services helps congresspersons win elections and there are reports that some congresspersons compete actively to try to convince voters that they deliver the best services. It can make a difference in close races. For example, Erika Hodell-Cotti talked about how her congressperson, Frank Wolf, sent her letters when her children got awards; the congressperson helped her brothers win admission to the West Point Military Academy. Much of what citizens want is merely help with navigating government bureaucracies. Oftentimes citizens contact member offices that do not represent them. Because resources for helping non-constituents are limited, an additional component of constituent service becomes directing citizens to their assigned representative in Congress.

An incumbent member of Congress has considerably more clout than most official ombudsmen at the state level, and in other countries, given the appointive and relatively diminutive character of such offices. As Morris Fiorina notes, the involvement of the legislative branch in the ombudsman process carries one major advantage: members of Congress exercise "control over what bureaucrats value most – higher budgets and new program authorizations." This kind of leverage over the bureaucracy is a potent tool that appointed ombudsmen lack. Accordingly, to improve on today's 435 de facto ombudsmen—constituent services by overworked Congressmen—congressional reforms have been proposed that would approximate the legislative leverage now exercised by Congressmen, but in an office where the intra-bureaucratic troubleshooting duties are full-time. Along these lines, some Congressmen themselves have suggested that each congressional district should elect a second U.S. Representative to handle constituent services.

One academic described the complex, intertwined relation between lawmakers and constituents as home style. Political scientist Lawrence Dodd suggested voters often choose a "powerful local incumbent who can assist with a desired local defense contract" rather than a reform-minded challenger who, if elected, wouldn't have much clout or power since they would lack seniority.

One way to categorize lawmakers is by their general motivation, according to political scientist Richard Fenno: (1) reelection—these are lawmakers who "never met a voter they didn't like" and provide excellent constituent services (2) good public policy –– legislators who "burnish a reputation for policy expertise and leadership" and (3) power in the chamber –– those who spend serious time along the "rail of the House floor or in the Senate cloakroom ministering to the needs of their colleagues." Famous legislator Henry Clay in the mid-19th century was described as an "issue entrepreneur" who looked for issues to serve his ambitions.

What's come to describe most congresspersons today is a need to avoid blame. One wrong decision or one damaging television image can mean defeat at the next election. Accordingly, some academics suggest there is a culture of risk avoidance as well as a need to make policy decisions behind closed-doors along with efforts to focus their publicity efforts at their home districts.
