= Iraq Economic Development Group =

Coordinates: 53°47′26.92″N 1°45′25.50″W

IEDG_UK Ltd
- Company type: Private Limited Company
- Industry: Financial services (Investment banking)
- Founded: 2008
- Headquarters: Bradford, England, UK
- Key people: Steven Lee Neely (CEO); Michael Wall (Deputy CEO)
- Products: Business, logistic, investment
- Revenue: unannounced
- Operating income: unannounced
- Net income: unannounced
- Website: www.investmentsiraq.org/

The Iraq Economic Development Group (also frequently abbreviated to IEDG) is an apolitical private limited company established in United Kingdom that facilitates financial services in Britain. Its official abbreviated form is IEDG_UK Ltd and its abbreviated form is commonly used. IEDG_UK Ltd. is headquartered in Bradford, West Yorkshire.

== Overview ==
IEDG_UK Ltd was formed in year 2007 under the Companies House by Steven Lee Neely (CEO), a former US Lieutenant Colonel, to encourage western businesses to see war-torn Iraq as a major investment opportunity rather than as a burden. The Bradford office, located at the Gumption Centre, is the company's strategic center as well as research center. IEDG officially commenced business operations on April 7, 2008 in Bradford with 4 staffs including the CEO himself.

IEDG_UK Ltd is an extension of The Iraq Economic Development and Investment Group (IEDIG), which is based in Iraq. The reason IEDG was extended to the United Kingdom was to run all its operations under the UK law with full transparency and away from Iraq's political climate. It is in the company's primary interest to keep corruption at minimal level, if not zero, and be accountable for every actions and transactions taken.

IEDG now has a marketing faculty, economics faculty, and a finance department working collaboratively by researching all matters pertaining to post-war Iraq.

== Mission ==
The mission of the company is primarily that of economic development supporting the reconstruction efforts in Iraq.
