= Corporate Dispatch =

Maltese English-language newspaper

- Format: News aggregator
- Owner(s): Corporate ID Group
- Founded: 24 March 2018
- Political alignment: Apolitical
- Language: English language
- Country: Malta
- Website: http://corporatedispatch.com

Corporate Dispatch is an English language newspaper published in Malta. Its first edition was published on 24 March 2018.

== History ==
Corporate Dispatch was first published on 24 March 2018. It describes itself as apolitical.
