= Political apathy =

Indifference towards politics

In political science, political apathy is a lack of interest or apathy towards politics. This includes voter apathy, information apathy and lack of interest in elections, political events, public meetings, and voting.

Voter apathy is a lack of interest among voters in the elections of representative democracies. Political apathy or lack of interest is often cited as a cause of low turnout among eligible voters in jurisdictions where voting is optional, and the donkey vote where voting is compulsory. This phenomenon occurs to some extent across all countries or entities where citizens are able to vote. Political apathy has led to increased concerns regarding representative democracies because election results do not encompass the entire population who are eligible to vote.

== Political alienation ==
Political apathy is sometimes considered distinct from political alienation, "the sense that voters feel like the political system does not work for them and any attempt to influence it will be a fruitless exercise." Political alienation is adversely related to political efficacy, the voter's trust in their ability to influence politics. The most common electoral consequences of political alienation are abstention and protest voting.

== Causes ==
One cause of political apathy is due to lack of education. According to a study by CIRCLE director Kei Kawashima-Ginsberg, nearly 20% of American youth do not feel they know enough to vote. Notably, the study found that many young people have glaring misconceptions about the voting process; for instance, several individuals in the study believed having relatively minor offenses on their criminal record, such as driving under the influence, restricted their ability to vote. This 20% figure is especially significant when juxtaposed with the 20% total youth turnout in the 2018 United States elections.

Sometimes, alienated voters feel compelled to vote, but feel "estranged or disaffected from the system or somehow left out of the political process." They recognize that they are underrepresented or not represented at all by those running for office; their best interest or concerns are not regarded.

Political alienation falls into two broad categories: political incapability and political discontentment. In the first instance, alienation is forced upon the individual by their environment, whereas in the second case it is voluntarily chosen by them.

There are at least five expressions of political alienation:

1. Political powerlessness. An individual's recognition that they cannot affect the actions of the government.
2. Political meaninglessness. An individual's recognition that political decisions are unclear and unpredictable.
3. Political normlessness. An individual's recognition that norms or rules intended to govern political relations are broken down, and that departures from prescribed behavior are common.
4. Political isolation. An individual's rejection of political norms and goals that are widely held and shared by other members of a society.
5. Political disappointment. An individual's disinterest to a political decision or participation because of the ruling class bad behaviors, such as, leaders having scandals by doing shameful things.

Political alienation overlaps with anti-politics, and there are likely causal relationships between the two concepts. Alienation differs from anti-political sentiment in that the latter tends to focus on negative assessments of politicians and political elites, whereas alienation may encompasses dissatisfaction with other elements of a political system, such as the electoral system, party system, or the idea of democratic society.

Another cause of political apathy is voter fatigue, when elections are held too frequently. In political science voter fatigue is defined as, "the apathy that the electorate can experience under certain circumstances, one of which could be that they are required to vote too often." One of the possible causes for voter fatigue is the barrage of political messages through social media. A large amount of exposure to political messages year-round can cause fatigue that turns potential voters away from the voting process.

Additional causes of political apathy include:

- being uncomfortable with the possible choices and the lesser of two evils principle in two-party systems
- wasted votes, where a voter does not receive representation in the final election outcome.
- strategic voting, where the electoral system incentivizes voting for a less preferred option to prevent an undesirable outcome.
- political corruption, where government officials or their network use politics for illegitimate private gain.
- political misinformation or disinformation in part contributed by political spin and social media platforms.
- being unable to vote due to legal or logistical barriers
- being overwhelmed by personal issues
- encountering registration problems.

== Background ==
The psychological factors that influence voter behavior are a voter's perceptions of politics, that is, how the voter sees the parties, the candidates, and the issues in an election. The farther down the ballot an office is, the fewer the number of votes that will be cast for it. This is called ballot fatigue. The expression suggests that many voters exhaust their patience or knowledge as they work their way down the ballot.

Prominent Founding Fathers writing in The Federalist Papers believed it was "essential to liberty that the government in general should have a common interest with the people," and felt that a bond between the people and the representatives was "particularly essential." They wrote "frequent elections are unquestionably the only policy by which this dependence and sympathy can be effectually secured." In 2009, however, few Americans were familiar with leaders of Congress.

In the 19th century there was a substantially large amount of voter turnout with numerous years with over 80% participation. This was due to several factors. One, political machines gave voters an incredible incentive to vote with favors of work, wealth, and political power (which were especially attractive to poor immigrants); however, political machines lost much of their power with the increased ability to vote and with more exposure on corrupt policies.

Numerous reports suggest voter apathy is widespread and growing. The percentage of Americans eligible to vote who did, in fact, vote was 63% in 1960, but has been falling since.

Vanderbilt professor Dana D. Nelson in Bad for Democracy argues that all citizens seem to do, politically, is vote for president every four years, and not much else; they have abandoned politics. Apathy was lower in the 2008 election, which featured a competitive election for president. Voter turnout in 2008 (62%) was the highest since 1968.

On the other hand, Hunter College professor Jamie Chandler claims that political apathy, or a lack of interest in the political system, is overstated in regards to socioeconomic factors. Wealth and educational attainment correlate most strongly with voter participation.

Political apathy is often found among younger voters, the poor, and minority groups. The Centre for Innovation, Research and Competence in the Learning Economy (CIRCLE) breaks down youths into different groups, Broadly Engaged (19%), Political Specialists (19%) and Only Voted (18%), with the rest clustered into Civically Alienated (16%), Politically Marginalized (14%) and Engaged Non-Voters (14%). In 2010, only 21% of youths eligible to vote in the United States between ages 18–21 voted or were politically active.

== Regional political apathy ==
=== Canada ===
Canada's voter turnout has remained relatively high compared to other developed democracies. In 2019, the share of the voting-age population registered to vote is around 93 percent. In the 2019 federal election, 77 percent of eligible voters reported that they had cast a ballot. However, one study highlights that the primary reason individuals abstained from voting in 2019 is due to a lack of interest in politics, at 35 percent, followed by 22 percent of non-voters who indicated that they were busy. The majority of non-voters were younger voters aged 18 to 24. Furthermore, Canadians who were citizens by birth reported lower voter turnout than naturalized citizens or immigrants in Canada; this may be due to the fact that individuals from foreign countries are more likely to provide a higher estimation of value to the democratic process. Overall, voter turnout has remained steady within the past decade.

=== European Union ===
Member-states in the European Union are able to vote in two ways. Voters are allowed to vote in elections within their own countries as well as in elections concerning the European Union through the European Parliament. Political apathy is seen in the European Union through elections within each country and within the European Parliament.

European Parliament elections are when individuals in EU member-states vote for matters concerning the entirety of the European Union through electing a representative from their country into the European Parliament. It is noted that turnout is frequently lower in such elections compared to national elections. Political apathy is speculated because individuals within the European Parliament often perceive such elections to hold low salience context. In such cases, individuals believe that there are less personal stakes attached to elections in the European Parliament. As such, such attitudes further imply that voters perceive such elections to be less important than national elections.

Another line of reasoning suggests that individuals may be dissatisfied with party positions within the European Parliament, especially regarding the subject of European integration. Research shows that the larger the distance between voters and their national party choices in the European Union, the more likely that they will abstain from voting in the European Parliament election. Hence, political apathy is a phenomenon that heavily impacts the turnout of European Parliament elections. However, in recent years, it is observed that increased politicization within the European Union has led to increased voter turnout. In 2019, 50.66 percent of EU members voted in the European Parliament election, increasing from 42.61 in 2014. Speculated reasons for this increase are pertaining to Brexit, the Migrant Crisis, climate change policy, and rising concern over anti-EU sentiment.

=== United Kingdom ===
In the United Kingdom, like many other western liberal democracies, there has been a steady decline in turnout in general elections over recent decades. After a peak in the 1950 General election with 83.9% turnout in the UK steadily declining to ultimately an all-time low turnout of 59.4% in the 2001 General election. Low turnout and disengagement in elections and the political process is more prevalent in younger voters. In addition to declining turnout over recent decades trust in the government has fallen also leading to disengagement.

=== United States ===
The presidential elections that occurred in 2020 (66% turnout) and 2024 (64% turnout) saw the highest and second highest turnout, respectively, since 1908 (66% turnout). Voter turnout was also high during the 2018 and 2022 elections.

A 2019 study finds that probabilistic forecasting can mislead voters to believe that the higher polling candidate would win the election, creating the potential of decreased turnout. A report from the American Association for Public Opinion Research, published after the 2016 presidential election, notes that during the election, "the probabilistic modelers declared that [Hillary] Clinton's likelihood of winning was about 90 percent... It is clear that most of those modelers under-stated how competitive the race actually was." The report emphasized that "the massive backlash and distrust of polls in the wake of the election makes clear that how polls, poll-based forecasts and the limitations of both are communicated to the public is sorely in need of improvement."

Although many in the U.S. see voting as an important act of patriotism, much of the public views the state of politics, the political parties and government leaders in a negative light.

According to the Pew Research Center, only 55.7 percent of the U.S. voting age population cast ballots in the 2016 presidential election. This percentage is a slight increase from the 2012 election, but lower than the 2008 election, which had record numbers. Voter turnout numbers in the United States are quite low compared to other developed nations. The United States was ranked 31 out of the 35 countries in this study. The Census Bureau recorded that there were roughly 245.5 million Americans who were eligible to vote, but only 157.6 million of eligible voters were registered to vote. The United States Election Project had similar findings, estimating apathy slightly higher: 46.9 percent of eligible voters did not vote in 2016. Many Americans do not take the effort to learn the voting process, as some see it as a burden.

There is an overemphasis on the number of Americans who have claimed they voted. The Clerk of the U.S. House of Representatives only recorded 136.8 million people, compared to the 137.5 million who claimed to have voted. This number also includes 170,000 ballots which were blank, spoiled, or null.

Voter registration in the United States is an independent responsibility, so citizens are able to choose whether they want to register or not. This led to only 64% of the voting age population being registered to vote in 2016. The United States is one of the sole countries that requires its citizens to register separately from voting. The lack of automatic registration contributes to the issue that there are over a third of eligible citizen in the United States that are not registered to vote.

Since 1976, voter turnout has stayed between an 8.5 percent range of fluctuation and has been on a historical downward trend, although there are differences among certain racial, ethnic, and age groups. Turnout has been lingering between 48% and 57% since 1980.

Voters between 45 and 65 year old and voters over 65 years old have the highest rate of voter turnout. In the time span from 1964 to 2004, 18-24 year olds usually had a voter turnout of 41.8%, compared to 25-44 year olds who had a turnout of 57.9%. Voters between 45 and 65 year old and voters over 65 years old have turnout rates of 69.3% and 66.6% respectively. Younger age groups are typically underrepresented in proportion; the greatest percentage of unregistered voters is in the 18-30 year old age group. People in younger age demographics are speculated to be more focused on other aspects in their life, such as college, marriage, and careers. In turn, younger demographics are less likely to learn about politics or understand the implications behind voting. Voters tend to be older, wealthier, and more educated than non-voters.

In a USA Today poll taken in 2012, 59 percent of citizens who chose not to vote because they believed that "'nothing ever gets done' in government". Another 54% of non-voters believed there is government corruption. Thirty seven percent explicitly stated that politics did not make any difference in their lives.

Certain voters are likely to refrain from elections due to their lack of interest in the available political stances. When the wishes of citizens are not properly addressed in government, voters are more likely to become uninterested in the democratic process. One reason for low turnout rates during primaries is due to the apathy regarding who will make it to the general election. Many individuals further believe only the general election in the United States is important. Congressional elections are also prone to political apathy. This leads candidates chosen out of increasingly polarized voter pools, which heighten rigidness and gridlock in the government. There is generally an inverse relationship between level of government and turnout rates.

In the 2016 presidential election in the U.S., turnout was 54.8% while in the midterm elections of 2018 the turnout rate of 50.0% and in the midterm elections of 2014 there was a historic low of 36.7% turnout to the elections. Based on government data, in the last 60 years eligible voters that have cast a ballot has ranged from 49 to 63%. The highest turnout occurred in the 1960 election in which President John F. Kennedy was elected, while the lowest turnout occurred in 1996 with the election for President Bill Clinton.

The 2016 United States presidential election saw political alienation as one of the central issues of the campaign. Both Donald Trump and Hillary Clinton made appeals to the working class in Midwestern states by pointing out that they feel as if their votes carried little weight and said communities had been abandoned by past candidates. Trump and Clinton did the same with Black and Latino voters in urban areas, voicing concerns with political alienation in the past. That election also saw an increase in voters in swing states and a decrease in voters living in "safe" states.

In a Google study on "Interested Bystanders," experts discovered that 48.9% of people in America are paying attention to the political world but not voicing any opinion on the matter (non-voting, non-volunteering for campaigns etc.), thus increasing political apathy in America.

== Possible solutions ==
Electoral reforms reducing wasted vote, reducing barriers to entry for new political parties, increasing proportionality and reducing presidentialism can reduce political apathy.

Another potential solution to political apathy in the younger generation is lowering the voting age. Multiple studies have shown that decreased civic instruction starting in the 1960s has led to decreased young voter turnout. In 2014, there was a record-low turnout of adults 18–29 with 20% casting a ballot. In 2018, only nine U.S. states required at least one year of government or civic education. A 2018 survey by the Woodrow Wilson National Fellowship Foundation found only one third of Americans could pass a general citizenship test, just 13% of young Americans knew when the Constitution of the United States was ratified, and less than 50% of respondents could accurately identify the member countries of the Axis powers of World War II. According to the Tuft study, this has led 20% of young adults to avoid voting due to not knowing enough information to cast a ballot.

Other possible solutions for the alienation of voters from politics are voting advice applications and participatory democracy. Belgian historian David van Reybrouck describes in his book Against Elections the current problems in Western democracy as the democratic fatigue syndrome and advocates a deliberative democracy based on sortition.

Alternatively, some intellectuals such as Jacques Ellul and Jason Brennan have argued that mass political participation may be meaningless or harmful in certain contexts, and as such, political apathy may be sometimes desirable or even the most ethical choice.

=== Civic technology ===
Civic technology seeks to counteract the effects of political apathy through more modern means, such as social media, applications, and websites. Many startups within the field of civic technology attempt to connect voters to politicians and government, in an attempt to boost voter participation and turnout. Examples include MySociety in the United Kingdom. A John S. and James L. Knight Foundation report found that $431 million had been invested in civic technology from January 2011 through May 2013, with $4 million specifically invested in voting technologies.

For the 2016 US presidential election, Facebook implemented reminders to register to vote in its social network. Several election officials have claimed that these efforts significantly increased voter registration.

== See also ==
- Abstention
- Anomie
- Anti-democracy
- Anti-politics
- Apoliticism
- Democratic deficit
- First they came ...
- Joke candidate
- Joke political party
- Political Disappointment
- Political quietism
- Populism
- Protest vote
- Religious rejection of politics
- Social alienation
- Wasted vote
