= Quietism =

Quietism may refer to:

- Quietism (Christian contemplation), a seventeenth-century movement and controversy concerning contemplative prayer in Catholic Christianity
- Quietism (philosophy), the view that the proper role of philosophy is a broadly therapeutic or remedial one
- Political quietism, the religious rejection of politics
  - Political quietism in Islam
