= Sara Marcus =

Writer and academic

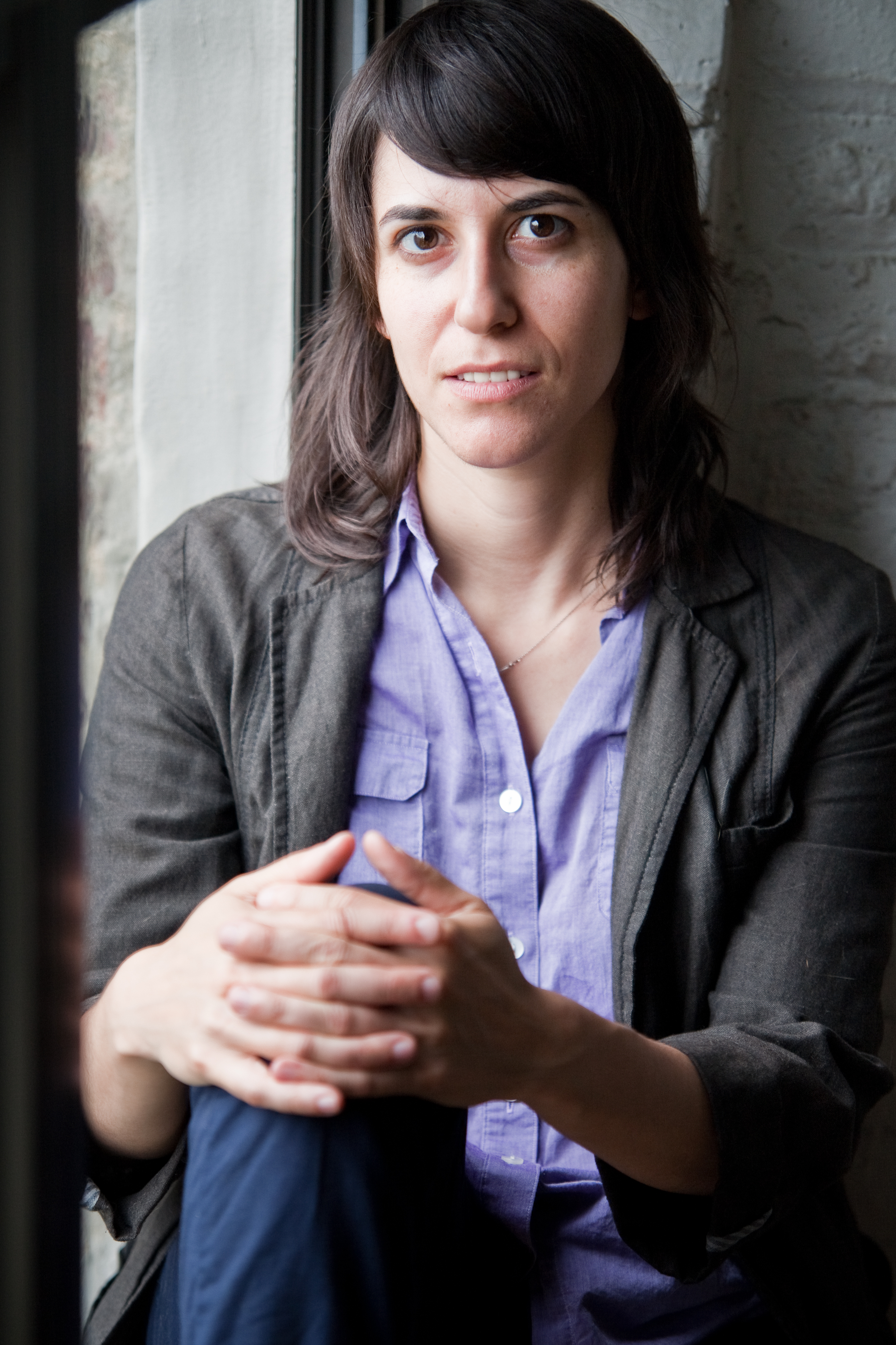
- Marcus in June 2010
- Education: Oberlin College; Columbia University; Princeton University
- Occupations: Writer, academic
- Employer: University of Notre Dame
- Known for: Girls to the Front: The True Story of the Riot Grrrl Revolution
- Movement: Riot Grrrl

Sara Marcus is a writer and musician best known for her 2010 book Girls to the Front: The True Story of the Riot Grrrl Revolution. She began her writing career as a participant in the riot grrrl movement, writing zines as a teenager in Washington, DC. She subsequently worked as a journalist, writing about music and politics. In 2018, she earned a PhD in English at Princeton University and is an assistant professor of English at the University of Notre Dame.

== Early life ==
Marcus began writing in the format of self-published zines in 10th grade, first as part of the riot grrrl movement in and around Washington, D.C. and then through her first year of college, where she also worked on student publications. She spent three semesters as an undergraduate at Yale, then transferred to Oberlin, where she graduated in 1999. She next earned an MFA in nonfiction writing from Columbia University. In 2012, she began graduate studies in the English Department at Princeton. Marcus is queer; she came out during her freshman year of high school.

== Career ==
Marcus's 367-page book Girls to the Front: The True Story of the Riot Grrrl Revolution was published by Harper Perennial in 2010. The project was initially born of Marcus's concern for the way the history of the movement had been chronicled in media, reduced to a mere fashion trend or even a joke, sidelining the central political concerns and getting it "wronger and wronger" as years passed. When she heard a male journalist was considering writing a book on the movement, Marcus felt an urgency about giving her own account to ensure "somebody who knew what they were talking about [would get] it out there...before someone who didn't know what they were talking about got to it first and distorted the story." Through personal activist and musical connections developed both during the Riot Grrrl years as well as later, Marcus had access to major figures of the movement, including Kathleen Hanna, Nomy Lamm, Ananda La Vita, Molly Neuman and Allison Wolfe. In Flavorwire, Jason Gross said, "Few people could have provided such a comprehensive, insider's view of the movement as [Marcus] did." Marcus left her full-time job and enrolled in Columbia's MFA program to pursue the project, then completed it during two stays at the MacDowell Colony.

Reviewing the book in the Los Angeles Times, Evelyn McDonnell says Marcus's book "Riot Grrrls' raw, emo agit-pop with a poetic fervor that matches its subject," though close to her subject—Marcus and McDonnell both were participants in the movement—McDonnell suggests Marcus "chronicles the brief-lived rebellion's sometimes nasty downward spiral with perhaps too much sympathetic regret." In Bookforum, Johanna Fateman of Le Tigre wrote, "In passionately describing Riot Grrrl's radical propositions as the youth movement that formed the sharper edges of both feminism's third wave and '90s punk rock, Marcus argues powerfully that it's a spirit of urgency and confrontation still needed in the feminist struggle for girls' lives."

Marcus writes about politics, books and music and was published in Bookforum, The San Francisco Chronicle, The Los Angeles Review of Books, Artforum, Slate, Salon, The Philadelphia Inquirer, The Forward. She was politics editor for five years at Heeb magazine. Her poetry has appeared in Death, Encyclopedia, EOAGH, Tantalum, and The Art of Touring.

Marcus earned a PhD in English from Princeton University in 2018. Her first academic book, Political Disappointment: A Cultural History from Reconstruction to the AIDS Crisis, examining the expression and uses of disappointment in American literature, music and activism, was published by Harvard University Press in 2023. She is an assistant professor in the English department of the University of Notre Dame.
