= Political Disappointment =

2023 book by Sara Marcus

Political Disappointment: A Cultural History from Reconstruction to the AIDS Crisis
- Author: Sara Marcus
- Publisher: Belknap Press
- Publication date: May 30, 2023
- ISBN: 978-0-674-24865-6

Political Disappointment: A Cultural History from Reconstruction to the AIDS Crisis is a nonfiction book by Sara Marcus. The book focuses on the Reconstruction era and the 20th century in the United States, conducting close readings of various works from the period to support the thesis that supporters of social justice experienced it as a succession of "political disappointments".

Political Disappointment was published by Belknap Press in 2023. It was positively reviewed in The Nation and The Yale Review, though both reviewers desired further evidence to demonstrate the role of political disappointment in historical political organizing.

== Background ==
Sara Marcus is a cultural critic and literary scholar. Marcus' first book, Girls to the Front, focused on the riot grrrl movement and was published in 2010. Her doctoral dissertation in English at Princeton University was titled "Political Disappointment: A Partial History of a Feeling"; she received her PhD in 2018.

Political Disappointment: A Cultural History from Reconstruction to the AIDS Crisis was published by Belknap Press on May 30, 2023.

== Synopsis ==
The main thesis of Political Disappointment is that supporters of social justice and political change have experienced the Reconstruction era and the 20th century in the United States as a succession of political disappointments, in which apparent opportunities for major change or revolution were suddenly closed off. She defines disappointment as "a persistent desire for an object that is less available than it previously had been".

Marcus discusses the examples of Reconstruction and the Jim Crow laws, the Communist Party transition from the Third Period to the Popular Front, and the shift from classical civil rights movement organizing to Black power organizing in the face of white terrorism. Also discussed later in the book is second-wave feminism and its attempts to build a political coalition, as well as the HIV/AIDS epidemic in the United States.

After providing historical information and context about each "political disappointment" she focuses on, Marcus conducts close readings of relevant works. When analyzing HIV/AIDS, she focuses on the art of Marlon Riggs and David Wojnarowicz. She explores Reconstruction through W. E. B. Du Bois' "Sorrow Songs" in The Souls of Black Folk, and discusses the Popular Front era alongside Tillie Olsen's writing and Lead Belly's music.

== Reception ==
In December 2022, Publishers Weekly selected Political Disappointment as one of the top 10 "Essays and Literary Criticism" publications scheduled for Spring 2023. Ari Brostoff interviewed Marcus for Jewish Currents shortly after the book was published.

In 2023, Lynne Feeley wrote a positive review of Political Disappointment in The Nation, praising Marcus' close readings while noting that she would have liked further discussion of how political disappointments have historically played a role in continued political organizing. Feeley also expressed appreciation of Marcus' treatment of disappointment as a "fundamentally generative" force in contrast to disillusionment or disavowal. Jennifer Ratner-Rosenhagen reviewed the book in The Yale Review alongside Costica Bradatan's In Praise of Failure. Ratner-Rosenhagen noted that Marcus' "limited and curated source material" does not fully support her claim that 20th century politics were consistently characterized by political disappointment. Still, Ratner-Rosenhagen praised Political Disappointment as having "the power to rouse readers out of their disenchantment".
