= Bad for Democracy =

2008 book by Dana D. Nelson

- First edition
- Author: Dana D. Nelson
- Language: English
- Subject: politics, democracy
- Publisher: University of Minnesota Press
- Publication date: September 19, 2008
- Publication place: United States
- Media type: Cloth/jacket
- Pages: 256 pages (1st edition, hardcover)
- ISBN: 978-0-8166-5677-6

Bad for Democracy: How the Presidency Undermines the Power of the People (2008) is a non-fiction book written by Vanderbilt professor Dana D. Nelson. It is notable for its criticism of excessive presidential power and for her call for substantive political reform. Nelson's focus is not on particular presidents, but she argues that the office of the presidency itself "endangers the great American experiment."

== Overview ==
Nelson argues the United States presidency has become too powerful and that all that citizens seem to do, politically, is vote for a president every four years and not much else. In her book, she described how the minimal task of voting blinds people to possibilities for substantive political participation: "The once-every-four-years hope for the lever pull sensation of democratic power blinds people to the opportunities for democratic representation, deliberation, activism and change that surrounds us in local elections." A reviewer commenting on her book echoed this theme: "We confuse our ... single vote that infinitesimally affects the outcome of a Presidential Election – with the operations of a functioning democracy," and the reviewer suggested that it is illusory that "voting in presidential elections somehow epitomizes democratic civic engagement."

== Detailed argument ==
Nelson wrote "Plenty of presidents have worked to increase presidential power over the years, but the theory of the unitary executive, first proposed under President Reagan, has been expanded since then by every president, Democrat and Republican alike." Nelson elaborated that "the unitary executive promised undivided presidential control of the executive branch and its agencies, expanded unilateral powers and avowedly adversarial relations with Congress."

Nelson blamed The Heritage Foundation and the Federalist Society for providing "a constitutional cover for this theory, producing thousands of pages in the 1990s claiming – often erroneously and misleadingly – that the framers themselves had intended this model for the office of the presidency." Nelson wrote that uncheckable presidential power has been expanded by using executive orders, decrees, memorandums, proclamations, national security directives and legislative signing statements—that already allow presidents to enact a good deal of foreign and domestic policy without aid, interference or consent from Congress. She wrote the unitary executive has been justified by an "expansive reading of Article II of the Constitution" complaining about congressional inactivity or national security. Nelson criticized signing statements by presidents Reagan, George H. W. Bush, Clinton, and George W. Bush. A signing statement is "the written text they are allowed to give when signing a bill into law in order to explain their position – not simply to offer warnings and legal interpretations but to make unilateral determinations about the validity of the provisions of particular statutes." Nelson noted that the American Bar Association denounced signing statements as presenting "grave harm to the separation of powers doctrine, and the system of checks and balances, that have sustained our democracy for more than two centuries." Nelson notes "presidential unilateralism can seem reassuring in times of crisis." Once Congress gives powers to the executive branch, it seldom can get them back. Nelson believes future presidents are unlikely to give up power. "History teaches that presidents do not give up power – both Democrats and Republicans have worked to keep it. And besides, hoping the next president will give back some powers means conceding that it is up to him to make that decision."

Nelson said in a radio interview in January 2009:

The problem with presidentialism is that it trains citizens to look for a strong leader to run democracy for us instead of remembering that that's our job. And it does this in a number of ways. First of all, I think it infantilizes citizens. It teaches us to see the president as the big father of democracy who is going to take care of all the problems for us and handle all of our disagreements. And so that makes us lazy and a little bit childish in our expectations about our responsibilities for our political system. It credits the president with super-heroic powers. Then, that allows him to operate often extralegally and unilaterally, and it teaches us to always want him always to have more power when things are wrong instead of asking why he has so much.

Nelson criticizes excessive worship of the president which she terms presidentialism, that is, "our paternalistic view that presidents are godlike saviors – and therefore democracy's only important figures." People seem to believe a myth that the president can solve all national problems, and she studies how different presidents have encouraged people to think along these lines. She makes an argument that the office of the presidency is essentially undemocratic, and she calls for greater participation by citizens at the local level. She joins a group of academics including Larry Sabato and Robert A. Dahl and Richard Labunski and Sanford Levinson as well as writers such as Naomi Wolf calling for substantive reform of the current Constitution.

== Reactions and criticism ==
Reviewer Russell Cole focused on the historical discussion in Nelson's book. He wrote that Nelson suggested that democracy flourished briefly after the American Revolution but that "enhanced democratic embodiment" declined after ratification of the Constitution, and argued that "behavioral habits that dispose the citizenry so that they take an active role in the ongoing affairs of government" were more extensive during the Colonial epoch than afterwards. When the Constitution established a centralized office, a "trend was set in motion that is comparable to the political transformation undergone by the Roman Republic during the Roman Revolution." The presidency was seen as a realization of the popular will in public policy. The presidency became almost paternalistic, "not only during times of uncertainty, peril, and calamity, but during times unmarked by social drama." In short, the president has come to personify democracy, according to Nelson. But Nelson sees this quality as harmful since it results in citizens becoming "democratically disinclined." Nelson argues that "Americans must learn to acknowledge that the unilateralism of the presidency is antithetical to democratic organization." Nelson wrote that Democracy was a "messy affair" needing "an ongoing public dialog" to find new compromises among shifting factions. Democracy should not be where a Decider is endowed with solitary authority. Cole criticizes Nelson's book at one point for a "lack of originality" regarding the "breadth of the normative section" of her work," but credits her with working towards a new episteme. He noted that Nelson sees benefits in decentralized political structures such as democracy, including resilience.

William Greider of The Nation wrote "Dana Nelson argues provocatively and persuasively‚ that the mythological status accorded the presidency is drowning our democracy. The remedy will not come from Washington. It starts with people rediscovering‚ then reclaiming‚ their birthright as active citizens, restoring meaning to the sacred idea of self-government."

David Bollier wrote "If democratic practice is going to flourish in the United States, the American people are going to have to roll up their sleeves and take on the hard work of self-governance. Dana Nelson offers an astute historical analysis of how the presidency, far from advancing this goal, has actually impeded it."

Minnesota critic Rachel Dykoski (now Rachel Lovejoy) found the book's writing style "long winded." She wrote that Nelson's book "makes the case that we've had 200+ years of propagandized leadership, which has systematically stripped away the checks and balances put in place by our nation's forefathers." Since Franklin Roosevelt, "every president has worked to extend presidential powers in ways that the Constitution's framers would likely have viewed as alarming and profoundly compromising ... The Bush administration ... brazenly partisan ... is not inventing new maneuvers." Nelson argues that there's a "mesmerizing power surrounding the office."

Critic Alexander Cockburn described Nelson's work as a "useful new book" and agreed that the "founders produced a Constitution that gives the president only a thin framework of explicit powers that belong solely to his office."
