= Religious rejection of politics =

Religious rejection of politics, sometimes known as political quietism, is a philosophy that can be found in a life of contemplation of nature. Adherents to this way of life find it preferable, while some ascetic schools of Hinduism or Buddhism also reject political involvement for different reasons.

== Adherents ==
In Christianity, some groups like Jehovah's Witnesses, the Christadelphians, the Amish, the Hutterites, and the Exclusive Brethren reject politics on the grounds that Christ's statements about his kingdom not belonging to this world mean that earthly politics can or must be rejected. Not all forms of political participation are necessarily rejected, however, as different sects interpret this requirement in different ways. For example, among the Old Order Amish, running for office is not allowed but voting is only discouraged, not forbidden.

Others, like those of the Baháʼí Faith, do not take part in partisan politics. They neither endorse particular candidates, nor join political parties. They are told to vote their consciences as individuals. If required to register in order to vote, they tend to do so as independent.

In other religious systems, political quietism can relate to a rejection of nationalism or even the concept of a nation. In certain schools of Islamic thinking, nations are seen as a creation of Western imperialism and ultimately all Muslims should be united religiously in the ummah. Therefore, Muslims should be in hijra, as nations, in the Western sense, are basically deemed apostate.

There are some aspects of the early days of the radical Takfir wal-Hijra that hint at this. Likewise various Christian denominations reject any involvement in national issues considering it to be a kind of idolatry called statolatry. Most Christians who rejected the idea of nations have associated with the Christian Left. Satmar Hasidic Judaism rejects the state of Israel being created before the return of the Messiah, therefore members of this group refuse to vote in Israel. This group does not reject all politics, but it does reject participation in Israeli politics.

Lastly, some religions do not specifically reject politics per se, but believe existing political systems are so inherently corrupt they must be ignored. In some respects the view of governments as apostate relates to that. In the early stages of the Nation of Islam, for example, many adherents rejected the idea of voting because the US political system was rejected in strong terms. In recent decades, however, this view has declined in popularity among Nation of Islam adherents or been rejected outright. In Hellenism, voting in elections deemed 'non-democratic' is not permitted and namely affects believers in the United States, the United Kingdom, and Russia.

In the United States, a 2006 survey indicated that 2% of those who did not register to vote cited religious reasons. The same survey reported that 22% of voting-age Americans are not registered to vote, meaning that 0.4% of all voting-age Americans did not register to vote for religious reasons.

== Religious groups that reject participation in politics ==
Religion	Adherents	Largest national membership
Jehovah's Witnesses	8,200,000	United States
Baháʼí Faith	6,000,000	India
Rastafarians	600,000	Jamaica
Old Order Amish	318,000	United States
Hellenism	120,000	Greece
Shaykhiya	100,000	Iraq
Christadelphians	50,000	Australia
Exclusive Brethren	40,000	Australia
Doukhobors	3,000	Canada
Purist Salafis	—	Saudi Arabia
Tablighi Jamaat	—	India
Nurcu	—	Turkey

== See also ==
- Anti-democracy
- Apoliticism
- Political alienation
- Political apathy
- Religion in politics
