= Dana D. Nelson =

American academic and activist

- Born: United States
- Education: Indiana University of Pennsylvania
- Known for: Bad for Democracy (2008)
- Awards: The Word in Black and White named Outstanding Academic Book of 1992–1993 by Choice
- Scientific career
- Fields: English, American literature, Politics
- Workplaces: Vanderbilt University

Dana D. Nelson is a professor of English at Vanderbilt University and a prominent progressive advocate for citizenship and democracy. She is notable for her criticism—in her books such as Bad for Democracy—of excessive presidential power and for exposing a tendency by Americans towards presidentialism, which she defines as the people's neglect of basic citizenship duties while hoping the president will solve most problems. Her scholarship focuses on early American literature relating to citizenship and democratic government.

== Academic career ==
Nelson earned a bachelor's degree from Indiana University of Pennsylvania in 1984 and master's (1986) and doctoral degrees (1989) from Michigan State University. She was associate professor of English at the University of Kentucky in 1998. Nelson's The Word in Black and White: Reading "Race" in American Literature, 1638–1867 was named "an Outstanding Academic Book of 1992–1993 by Choice." The book explored how eleven "Anglo-American authors constructed 'race'", including a study of The Last of the Mohicans and Incidents in the Life of a Slave Girl, and earned positive reviews.

Nelson taught at the University of Kentucky, Duke University, the University of Washington, and Louisiana State University. In 2006, she co-edited with Russ Castronovo a collection of essays entitled Materializing Democracy: Toward a Revitalized Cultural Politics. One reviewer described the effort as an "ambitious, multi-disciplinary effort to make the subjective turn by warning against the danger of reducing democracy to 'an exclusively moral category that is no longer connected with political, economic, or social categories.'" In 2007, she wrote an essay entitled "Democracy in Theory" in the journal American Literary History. She edited 19th-century abolitionist Lydia Maria Child's A Romance of the Republic in 2003.

In 2009, Nelson was the Gertrude Conaway Vanderbilt professor of English and American studies at Vanderbilt University. She taught U.S. literature, history, and culture and courses that connect activism, volunteering, and citizenship. She has also lectured at colleges such as Purdue University and the University of Kentucky. She has published numerous books, essay collections, and articles on U.S. literature and the history of citizenship and democratic culture. Nelson lives in Nashville where she is involved in a program that helps incarcerated women develop better decision-making skills and works with an innovative activist group fighting homelessness in the area. Nelson is co-editor of the academic journal J19: The Journal of Nineteenth-Century Americanists.

== Books, scholarship, activism ==
In her 2008 book Bad for Democracy, Nelson criticizes presidentialism which she sees as worship of the presidency and federal politics to the exclusion of all else. She believes the presidency has become too powerful. She thinks the presidency has become a cult and is harmful for democracy. One reviewer wrote that Nelson's conception was that presidentialism was a "result of the American citizenry's tendency to look to the sitting president as simultaneously a unifier of the citizenry and a protector from political threats." Another reviewer wrote: "Bad for Democracy surveys the evolving role of the president in the national psyche, and examines how presidential powers have expanded far beyond the intentions of the Constitution's framers ... Nelson combines her analysis with a plea for a return to grassroots democracy and activism."

Nelson explained in an interview: "My book argues that our habit of putting the president at the center of democracy and asking him to be its superhero works to deskill us for the work of democracy. And, it argues that the presidency itself has actually come to work against democracy." She argues Americans tend to "super-size the presidency" and this is at odds with what the founding fathers might have wanted. Newspaper columnist David Sirota wrote "this culture of 'presidentialism,' as Vanderbilt Professor Dana Nelson calls it, has justified the Patriot Act, warrantless wiretaps and a radical theory of the unitary executive that aims to provide a jurisprudential rationale for total White House supremacy over all government." Nelson advocates a grassroots effort to restore democracy. She explained in 2009: "We stop waiting for someone else to do it for us. We organize together, using public spaces and the internet. We form blogs, we write letters to the editor, we show up at Congress, we protest, we call, we lobby, we boycott, we buycott, we email our representatives, we find supporters, we get them moving, we grow the movement. We ignore the idea that the right president will do it for us and find every way we can to do it ourselves. Great if the president will help but totally unnecessary." Nelson has spoken on National Public Radio.

She wrote an opinion piece in the Los Angeles Times about the theory of the unitary executive. All presidents have striven to expand executive power but she cites Ronald Reagan who expanded unilateral powers and promised "undivided presidential control of the executive branch and its agencies" as well as adversarial relations with Congress. Proponents of the unitary executive "want to expand the many existing uncheckable executive powers – such as executive orders, decrees, memorandums, proclamations, national security directives and legislative signing statements – that already allow presidents to enact a good deal of foreign and domestic policy without aid, interference or consent from Congress." She added that "each president since 1980 has used the theory to seize more and more power."

She is writing Ugly Democracy, which explores alternative notions of democracy and why they were lost from our "democratic archive for citizenship" and probes possible alternatives for today.

== Publications ==
- 2009, (pending; writing in progress), Ugly Democracy
- 2008, Bad for Democracy: How the Presidency Undermines the Power of the People
- 2007, "Democracy in Theory", American Literary History
- 2005, AmBushed: On the Costs of Macht-Politik
- 2003, (editor) A Romance of the Republic
- 2002, (co-editor with Russ Castronovo), Materializing Democracy: Toward a Revitalized Cultural Politics
- 2001, (co-edited with Houston Baker) Violence, the Body and The South
- 1998, National Manhood: Capitalist Citizenship and the Imagined Fraternity of White Men
- 1997, (editor) Lydia Maria Child, Romance of the Republic
- 1994, Principles and Privilege: Two Women's Lives on a Georgia Plantation
- 1993, Rebecca Rush, Kelroy
- 1992, The Word in Black and White: Reading 'Race' in American Literature, 1638–1867
