= Apoliticism =

Indifferent attitude to politics

Apoliticism is apathy or antipathy towards all political affiliations. A person may be described as apolitical if they are uninterested or uninvolved in politics. Being apolitical can also refer to situations in which people take an unbiased position in regard to political matters. The Collins English Dictionary defines apolitical as "politically neutral; without political attitudes, content, or bias."

== History ==
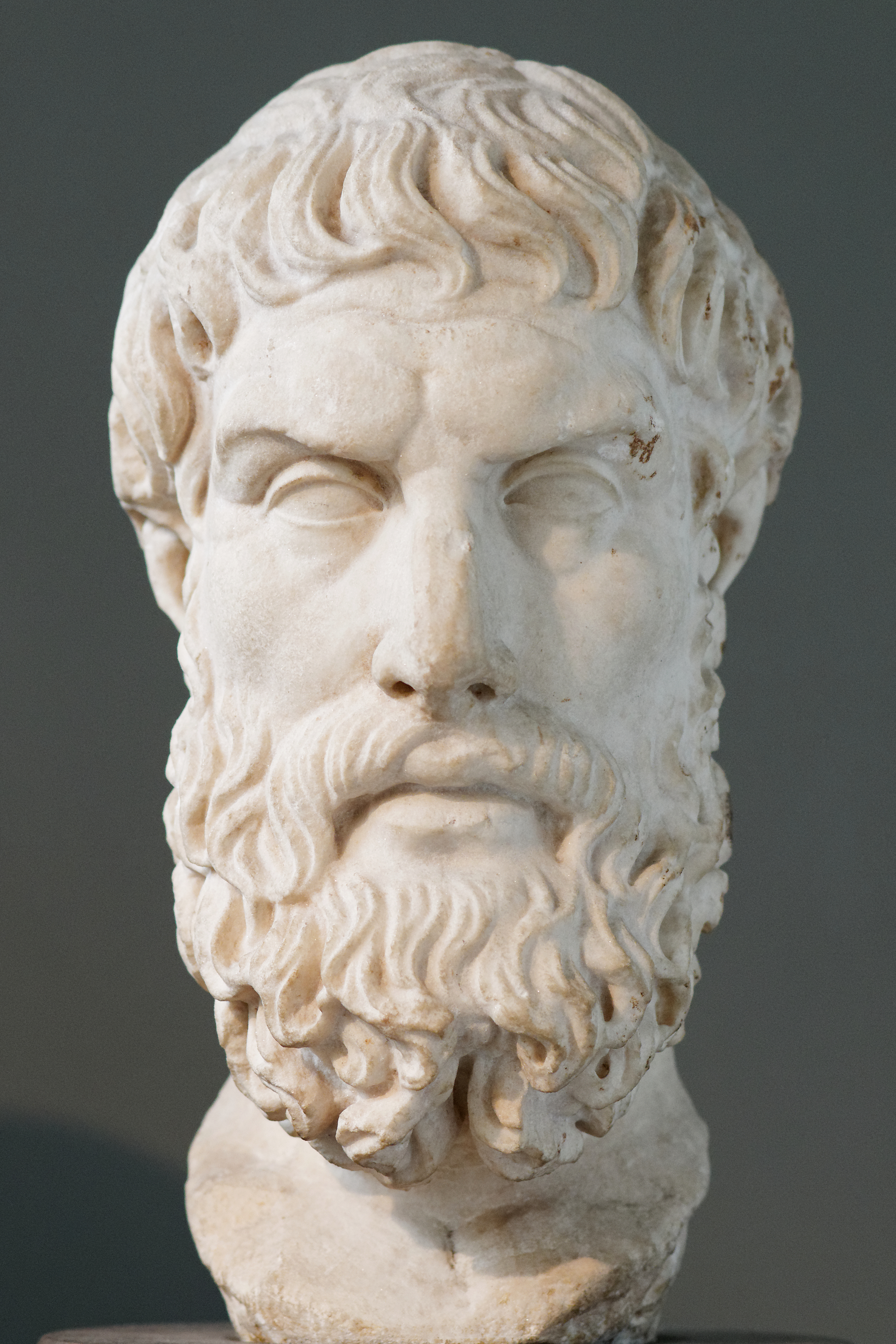
Epicurus

During classical antiquity, the Epicureans assumed disengagement from the life of the city as a doctrinal position. Seeking pleasure in the absence of suffering for the body and trouble for the soul, they saw political activity as a source of unnecessary stress that would not lead to these ends. However, they were not strictly apolitical and participated when political activity would bring them pleasure or aid in the avoidance of their suffering.

=== Christianity ===
The Protestant Anabaptists adopted apolitical beliefs and practices: Anabaptist radicalism resulted in a sharp separation of Christian communities from the state. With the progression of time, peace church traditions and evangelical social reformism have led to greater engagement. More ascetic traditions have tended to adopt a minimalistic approach to political engagement, personal salvation and church mission being preoccupations instead.

== Civil society ==
Sir Robert Peel inspired the Peelian principles by which law enforcement by police in England was civilian rather than an instrument of the state in contrast to the basis of gendarmerie model of policing. In 1984 this was brought into question at the Battle of Orgreave.

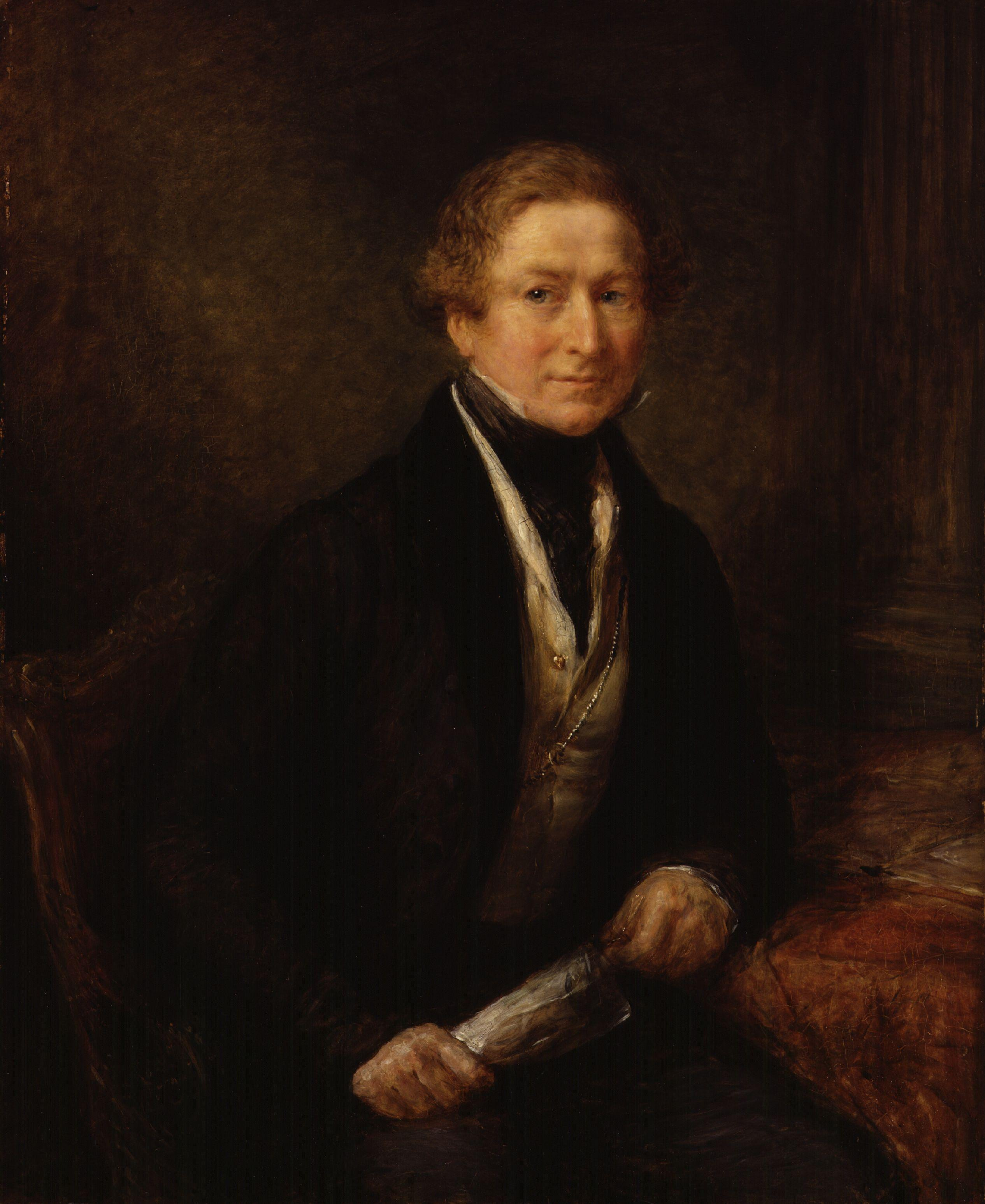
Sir Robert Peel, 2nd Bt by John Linnell

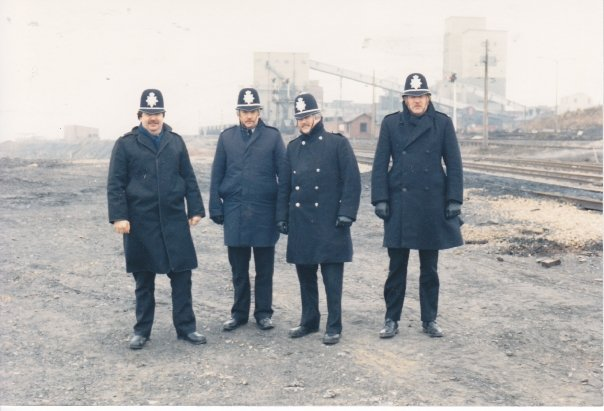
West Midland Police Officers at Orgreave.

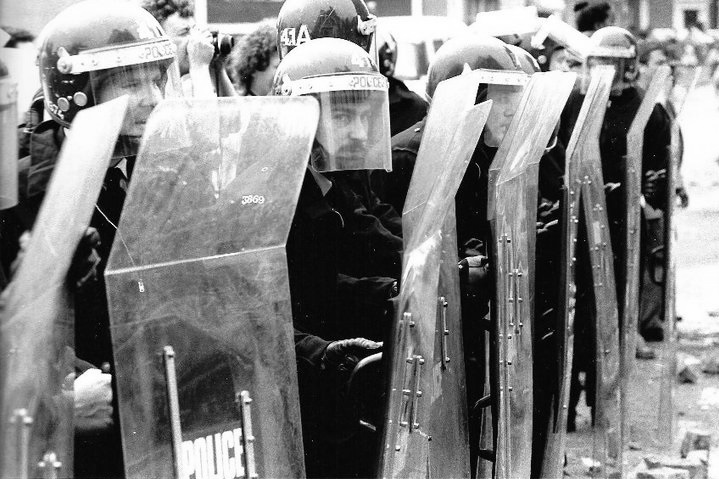
A "long shield" Police Support Unit, equipped with protective riot gear and acrylic shield. "Short shield" units were equipped with smaller, round shields which afforded greater mobility (1985).

Reithian principles were directly the basis for the establishment of the public corporation, the British Broadcasting Corporation (BBC), an early pioneer in broadcasting with an emphasis on impartiality.

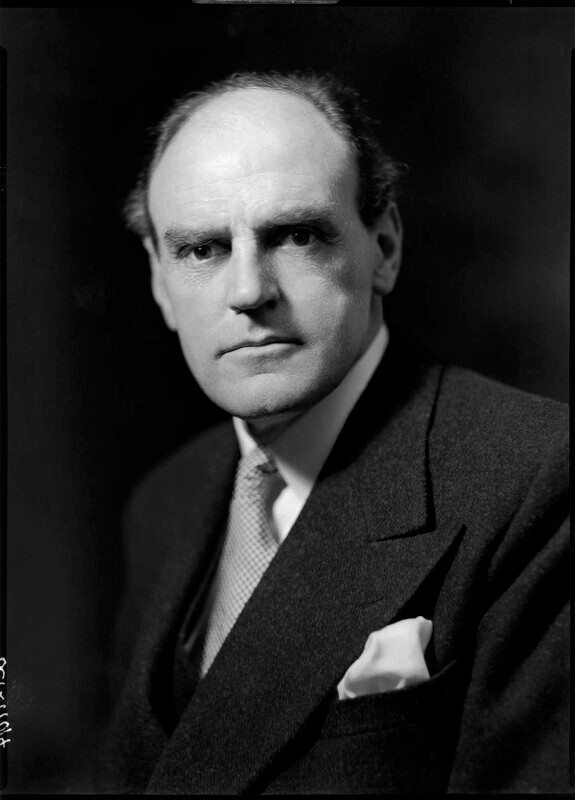
John Reith, 1st Baron Reith, 1934

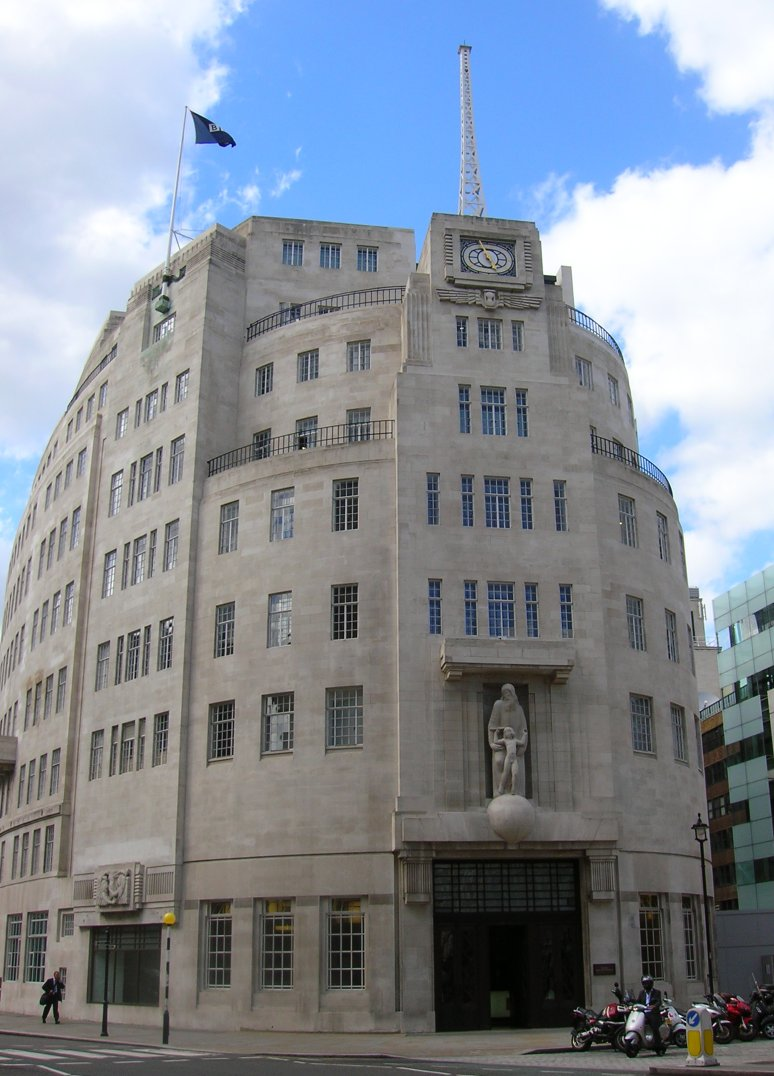
Original BBC Broadcasting House

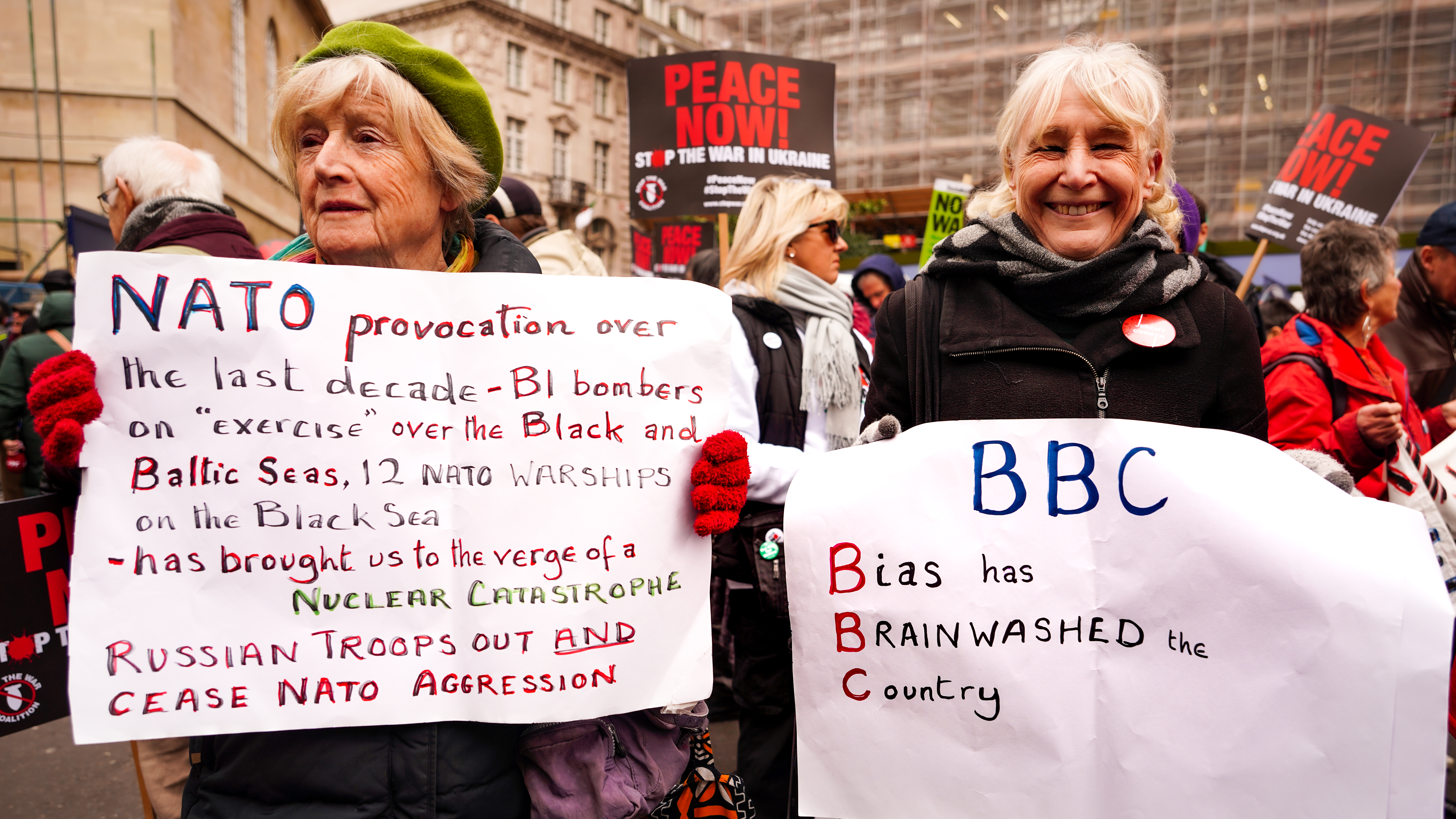
Protest against BBC bias over Boris Johnsons role in the Ukraine war, 2022

BBC Russian Service In its 2007 Foreign and Commonwealth Office Annual Report the House of Commons' Foreign Affairs Committee concluded that "the development of a partnership with the international arm of a Russian state broadcasting network puts the BBC World Service's reputation for editorial independence at risk".

== Criticisms ==
Apoliticism as an ideology is criticised for its claim that it is possible to remain impartial. The Italian Communist, Antonio Gramsci, argues that by ignoring the political nature of everyday life, "neutral" individuals make a choice to ignore oppressive regimes and practises, which manifests as an acceptance and passive approval of them. The following instance is indicative of this rhetoric:

"all men are political beings […] Every man, in as much as he is active, i.e. living, contributes to modifying the social environment in which he develops (to modifying certain of its characteristics or to preserving others); in other words, he tends to establish 'norms', rules of living and behaviour."

—Antonio Gramsci Selections from Prison Notebooks: State and Civil Society 1971

Another example of this is the political slogan: The personal is political. The phrase was popularised by radical feminist Carol Hanisch in her essay of the same name, which analyses the ways in which the personal problems of women are actually political ones.

== See also ==
- Abstention
- Dealignment
- Disenchantment
- Independent media
- Non-voting
- Political apathy
- Political nihilism
- Protest vote
- Religious rejection of politics
- Social rejection
