= List of grand imams of al-Azhar =

The grand imam of al-Azhar is the Shaykh al-Islam of al-Azhar University, Egypt, and is considered the highest authority in Sunni Islamic jurisprudence and holds great influence on followers of the theological Ash'ari and Maturidi traditions worldwide. The Grand Imam of al-Azhar is the most prominent official religious role in Egypt. Prior to the establishment of the post under the Ottoman Empire, the holder of that position was named Mushrif then later a Nazir. Between 1860 and 1864 a board of scholars served the role as Grand Imam.

Several of the Grand Imams served multiple terms; each term is listed separately. The original sources give the year based on the Islamic calendar, so the conversion to Gregorian years by later Western sources may not be precise.

== List ==
№	Portrait	Name	Began	End	Madhhab	Notes
1		Muhammad al-Kharashi (Arabic: محمد الخرشي)	1679	1690	Maliki	al-Kharashi (1601–1690) was born in Abu Kharash, Beheira Governorate
2		Ibrahim al-Barmawi (Arabic: إبراهيم البرماوي)	1690	1695	Shafii	al-Barmawi (died 1695) was born in Barma, Gharbia Governorate
3		Muhammad al-Nasharti (Arabic: محمد النشرتي)	1695	1709	Maliki	al-Nasharti (died 1709) was born in Nashart, Kafr El Sheikh Governorate
4		Abd al-Baqi al-Qalini (Arabic: عبد الباقي القليني)	1709	1709	Maliki	al-Qalini was born in Qallin, Kafr El Sheikh Governorate
5		Muhammad Shanan (Arabic: محمد شنن)	1709	1720	Maliki	Shanan (1656–1720) was born in Al Gadeyah, Beheira Governorate
6		Ibrahim al-Fayyumi (Arabic: إبراهيم الفيومي)	1720	1724	Maliki	al-Fayyumi (1652–1724) was born in Faiyum, Faiyum Governorate
7		Abdullah al-Shubrawi (Arabic: عبد الله الشبراوي)	1724	1758	Shafii	al-Shubrawi (1681–1758) was born in Cairo, Cairo Governorate
8		Muhammad al-Hiffnawi (Arabic: محمد بن سالم الحفني)	1758	1767	Shafii	al-Hiffnawi (1688–1768) was born in Hiffna, Sharqia Governorate
9		Abd al-Rauf al-Sajini (Arabic: عبد الرؤوف السجيني)	1767	1769	Shafii	al-Sajini was born in Sagin Al Kom, Gharbia Governorate
10		Ahmed al-Damanhuri (Arabic: أحمد الدمنهوري)	1769	1778	Hanafi, Maliki, Shafi'i and Hanbali	al-Damanhuri was born in Damanhur, Beheira Governorate
11		Ahmed al-Arusi (Arabic: أحمد العروسي)	1778	1793	Shafii	Ahmed al-Arusi (1720–1804) was born in Manyal Arous, Monufia Governorate. He was the father of #14 Muhammed al-Arusi, grandfather of #20 Mustafa al-Arusi.
12		Abdullah al-Sharqawi (Arabic: عبد الله الشرقاوي)	1793	1812	Shafii	al-Sharqawi (1737–1812) was born in At Tawilah, Sharqia Governorate
13		Muhammed al-Shanawani (Arabic: محمد الشنواني)	1812	1818	Shafii	al-Shanawani (died 1818) was born in Shanawan, Monufia Governorate
14		Muhammed al-Arusi (Arabic: محمد العروسي)	1818	1829	Shafii	Muhammed al-Arusi was the son of #11 Ahmed al-Arusi, father of #20 Mustafa al-Arusi.
15		Ahmed al-Damhuji (Arabic: أحمد الدمهوجي)	1829	1830	Shafii	al-Damhuji (1761–1831) was born in Damhuj, Monufia Governorate
16		Hasan al-Attar (Arabic: حسن العطار)	1830	1834	Shafii	al-Attar (1766–1835) was born in Cairo, Cairo Governorate. He was of Moroccan origin.
17		Hasan al-Quwaysini (Arabic: حسن القويسني)	1834	1838	Shafii	al-Quwaysini (died 1838) was born in Quesna, Monufia Governorate
18		Ahmed al-Sa'im al-Safti (Arabic: أحمد السفطي)	1838	1847	Shafii	al-Safti was born in Saft El Arfa, Beni Suef Governorate
19		Ibrahim al-Bajuri (Arabic: إبراهيم الباجوري)	1847	1864	Shafii	al-Bajuri (1784–1864) was born in El Bagour, Monufia Governorate
20		Mustafa al-Arusi (Arabic: مصطفى العروسي)	1864	1870	Shafii	Mustafa al-Arusi (1798–1876) was the son of #14 Muhammed al-Arusi, grandson of #11 Ahmed al-Arusi.
21		Muhammad al-Mahdi (Arabic: محمد المهدي العباسي)	1870	1881	Hanafi	al-Mahdi (1827–1897) was born in Alexandria, Alexandria Governorate
22		Shams al-Din Muhammad al-Imbabi (Arabic: شمس الدين الأنبابي)	1881	1882	Shafii	al-Imbabi (1824–1896) was born in Cairo, originally from Imbaba, Giza Governorate
(21)		Muhammad al-Mahdi (Arabic: محمد المهدي العباسي)	1882	1886	Hanafi	
(22)		Shams al-Din Muhammad al-Imbabi (Arabic: شمس الدين الأنبابي)	1886	1895	Shafii	
23		Hassunah al-Nawawi (Arabic: حسونة النواوي)	1895	1899	Hanafi	al-Nawawi (1839–1924) was born in Nawai, Asyut Governorate
24		Abd al-Rahman al-Qutb al-Nawawi (Arabic: عبد الرحمن القطب النواوي)	1899	1899	Hanafi	al-Nawawi (died 1909) was born in Nawai, Asyut Governorate
25		Salim al-Bishri (Arabic: سليم البشري)	1899	1903	Maliki	al-Bishri (1832–1916) was born in Mahallat Bishr, Beheira Governorate
26		Ali al-Biblawi (Arabic: علي الببلاوي)	1903	1905	Maliki	al-Biblawi (1835–1905) was born in Biblaw, Asyut Governorate
27		Abd al-Rahman al-Shirbini (Arabic: عبد الرحمن الشربيني)	1905	1907	Shafii	al-Shirbini (died 1908) was probably born in Sherbin, Dakahlia Governorate
(23)		Hassanuh al-Nawawi (Arabic: حسونة النواوي)	1907	1909	Hanafi	
(25)		Salim al-Bishri (Arabic: سليم البشري)	1909	1917	Maliki	
28		Muhammad al-Jizawi (Arabic: محمد أبو الفضل الجيزاوي)	1917	1927	Maliki	al-Jizawi (1874–1927) was born in El-Warraq, Giza Governorate
29		Mustafa Al-Maraghi (Arabic: محمد مصطفى المراغي)	1927	1929	Hanafi	al-Maraghi (1881–1945) was born in El Maragha, Sohag Governorate
30		Muhammad al-Zawahiri (Arabic: محمد الأحمدي الظواهري)	1929	1935	Shafii	al-Zawahiri (1878–1944) was born in Kafr Ash Sheikh Dhawahri, Sharqia Governorate. He was of Arab origin.
(29)		Mustafa Al-Maraghi (Arabic: محمد مصطفى المراغي)	1935	1945	Hanafi	
31		Mustafa Abd al-Rizq (Arabic: مصطفى عبد الرازق)	1945	1947	Hanafi	Abd al-Rizq (1885–1947) was born in Abu Jirj, Minya Governorate
32		Muhammad Ma'mun al-Shinnawi (Arabic: محمد مأمون الشناوي)	1948	1950	Hanafi	al-Shinnawi (1878–1950) was born in El Zarqa, Damietta Governorate
33		Abd al-Majid Salim (Arabic: عبد المجيد سليم)	1950	1951	Hanafi	Salim (1882–1954) was born in Meet Shahala, Monufia Governorate
34		Ibrahim Hamrush (Arabic: إبراهيم حمروش)	1951	1952	Hanafi	Hamrush (1880–1960) was born in Al Khawaled, Beheira Governorate
(33)		Abd al-Majid Sulaym (Arabic: عبد المجيد سليم)	1952	1952	Hanafi	
35		Muhammad al-Khadi Husayn (Arabic: محمد الخضر حسين)	1952	1954	Maliki	Husayn (1876–1958) was born in Nefta, Tozeur Governorate, Tunisia.
36		Abd al-Rahman Taj (Arabic: عبد الرحمن تاج)	1954	1958	Hanafi	Taj (1896–1975) was born in Asyut, Asyut Governorate
37		Mahmud Shaltut (Arabic: محمود شلتوت)	1958	1963	Hanafi	Shaltut (1893–1963) was born in Minyat Bani Mansur, Beheira Governorate
38		Hassan Mamoun (Arabic: حسن مأمون)	1963	1969		Mamoun (1894–1973) was born in Cairo, Cairo Governorate
39		Muhammad al-Fahham (Arabic: محمد الفحام)	1969	1973		al-Fahham (1894–1980) was born in Alexandria Governorate
40		Abdel Halim Mahmoud (Arabic: عبد الحليم محمود)	1973	1978	Maliki	Mahmoud (1910–1978) was born in Al Salam, Sharqia Governorate
41		Muhammad Abd al-Rahman Bisar (Arabic: محمد عبد الرحمن بيصار)	1979	1982		Bisar (1910–1982) was born in As Salmiyyah, Kafr El Sheikh Governorate
42		Gad al-Haq (Arabic: جاد الحق علي جاد الحق)	1982	1996		al-Haq (1917–1996) was born in Batra, Dakahlia Governorate
43		Muhammad Sayyid Tantawy (Arabic: محمد سيد طنطاوي)	1996	2010	Shafii	Tantawy (1928–2010) was born in Selim ash-Sharqiyah, Tima municipality, Sohag Governorate
44		Ahmed El-Tayeb (Arabic: أحمد الطيب)	2010	present	Maliki	El-Tayeb (born 1946) was born in Kurna, Luxor Governorate
