= Al-Azhar attire =

Scholars, students, and reciters affiliated with al-Azhar University

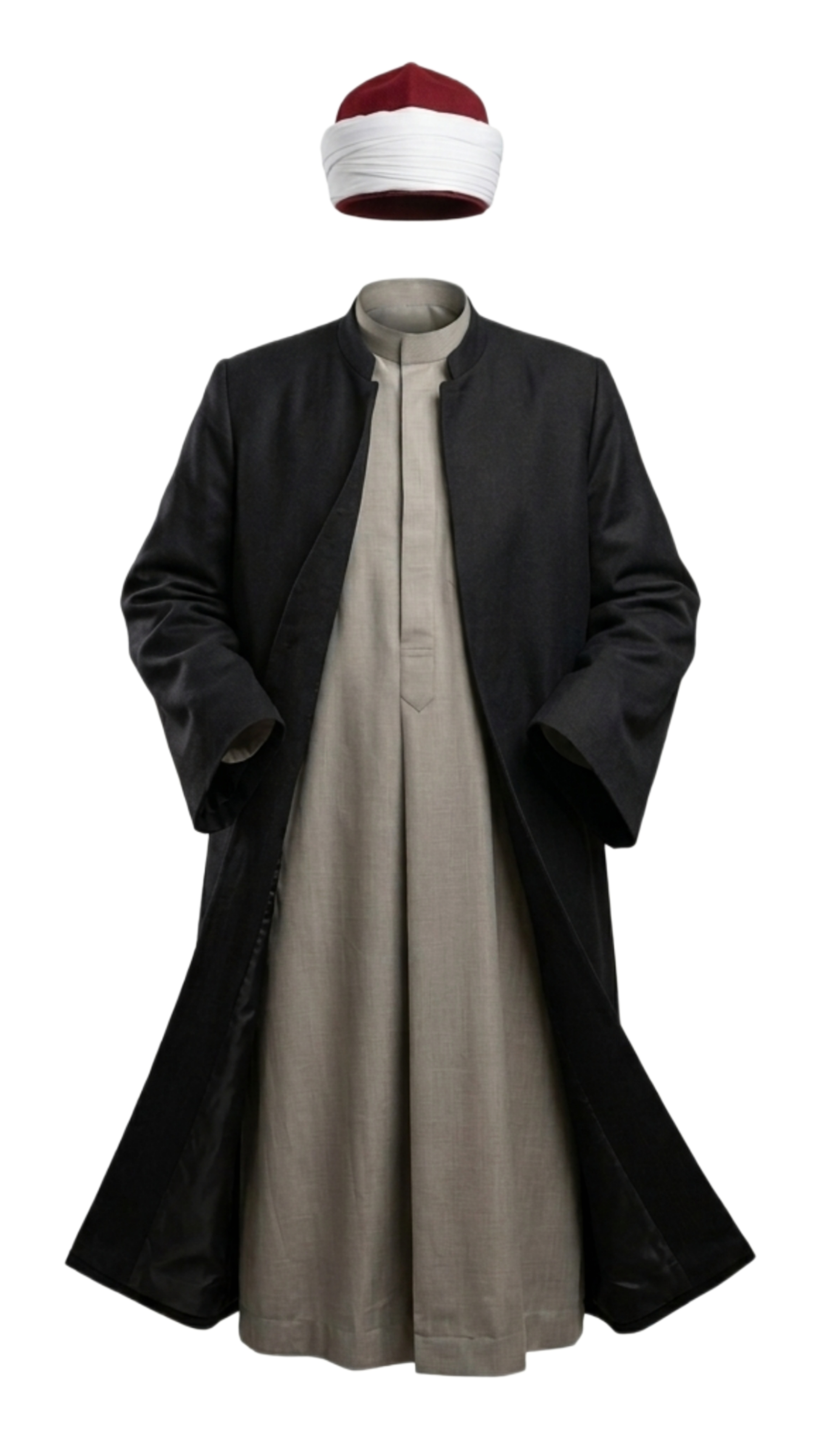
- Al-Azhar attire
- Type: Religious / formal dress
- Place of origin: Egypt

Al-Azhar attire is the traditional formal dress worn by scholars and students of al-Azhar in Egypt. It is regarded as a symbol of the moderate identity and tolerance represented by the institution through the centuries. The attire consists mainly of the Azhar turban and the body garment represented by the inner kaftan and outer jubbah.

== History ==
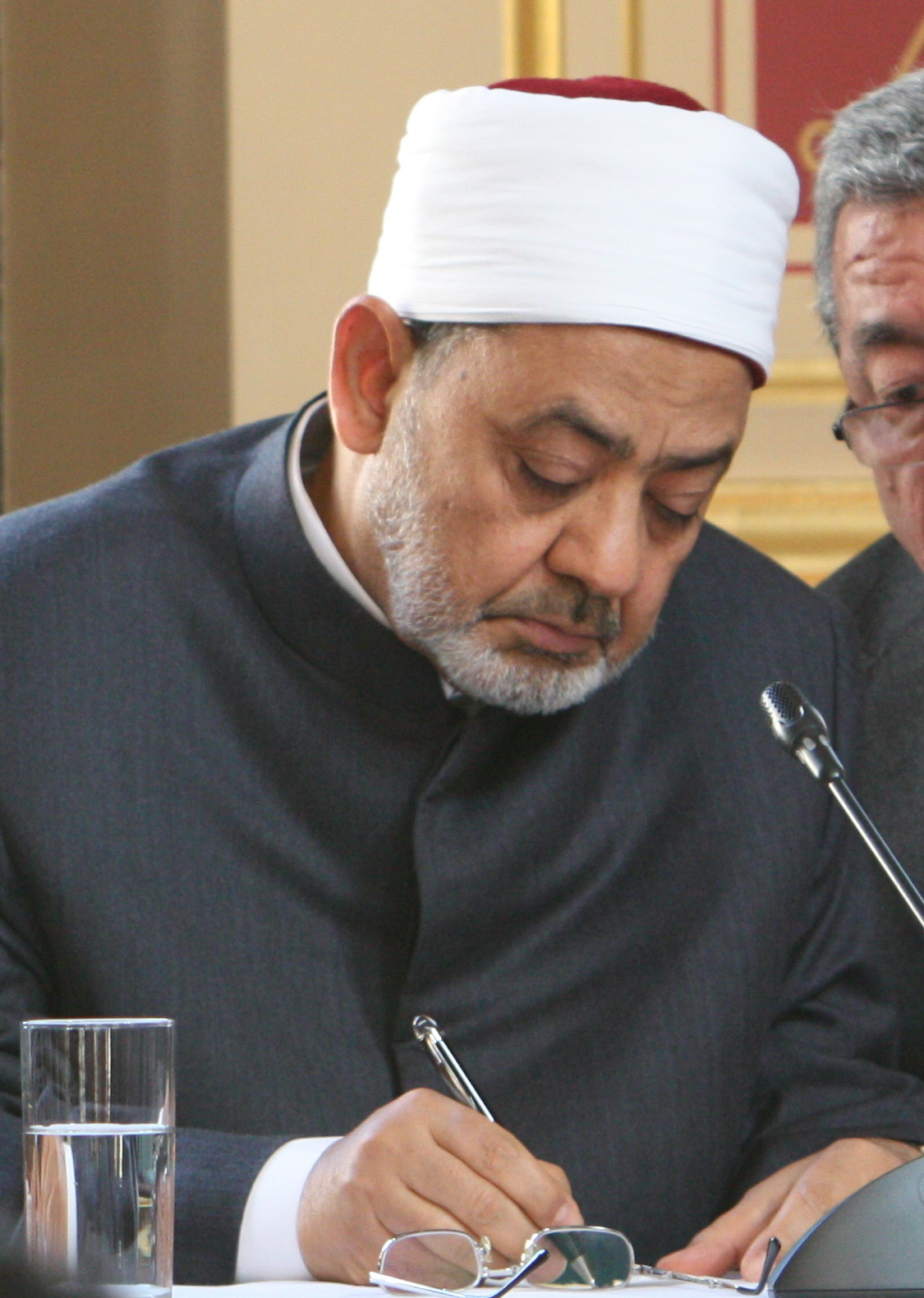
Ahmed el-Tayeb, the Grand Imam of Al-Azhar, wearing Al-Azhar attire.

The roots of the Azhar attire go deep into the Islamic history of Egypt. Al-Azhar Mosque witnessed different forms of turbans since its foundation in the Fatimid era in 972, when the original aim was to spread Shi'ism, and the turbans then differed in style from the current form. With Egypt's transition to the Sunni school in the Ayyubid era, the attire began to take on a new character.

The current form of the turban (white cloth over the red fez) became established during the Mamluk and Ottoman periods. During the rule of Muhammad Ali Pasha, the fez industry flourished and became an obligatory part of the dress of state employees and students; Azharis distinguished themselves by wrapping the white shawl around the fez to set them apart from other groups. This tradition continued until the 1952 July Revolution, when President Gamal Abdel Nasser abolished the requirement for Egyptians to wear the fez, but the Azhar attire remained a distinctive feature of al-Azhar scholars and students.

== The turban ==
The Azhar turban is a distinctive mark of its scholars. It consists of a red fez (which dates back to the Ottoman era) wrapped with a white shawl made of cloth or wool. Its production relies mainly on precise handicraft work using a needle, and heating with fire is sometimes used to shape its final form.

=== Types of the turban ===
The turban differs in its technical details according to the role of the wearer:

- The scholars' and students' turban: This is the traditional, sober turban worn by the Grand Imam of al-Azhar, the Grand Mufti of Egypt, the Egyptian Minister of Endowments, mosque imams, and students of the Sharia faculties at al-Azhar University. It is distinguished by the darker red color of the fez on top and by being wrapped by hand. It is relatively taller than the reciters' turban.
- The turban of reciters and broadcasters: It has an aesthetic character described by craftsmen as "festive." It differs from the scholars' turban in that its fez tends toward a lighter red color, with a "blue button" (tassel) at the top, and its wrapping is more rounded and prominent. It was famously worn by major reciters such as Sheikh Abdel Basset Abdel-Samad and Sheikh al-Tablawi.
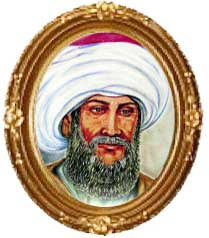
Ibrahim al-Barmawi, the second Grand Imam of al-Azhar, wearing a turban similar to its present form

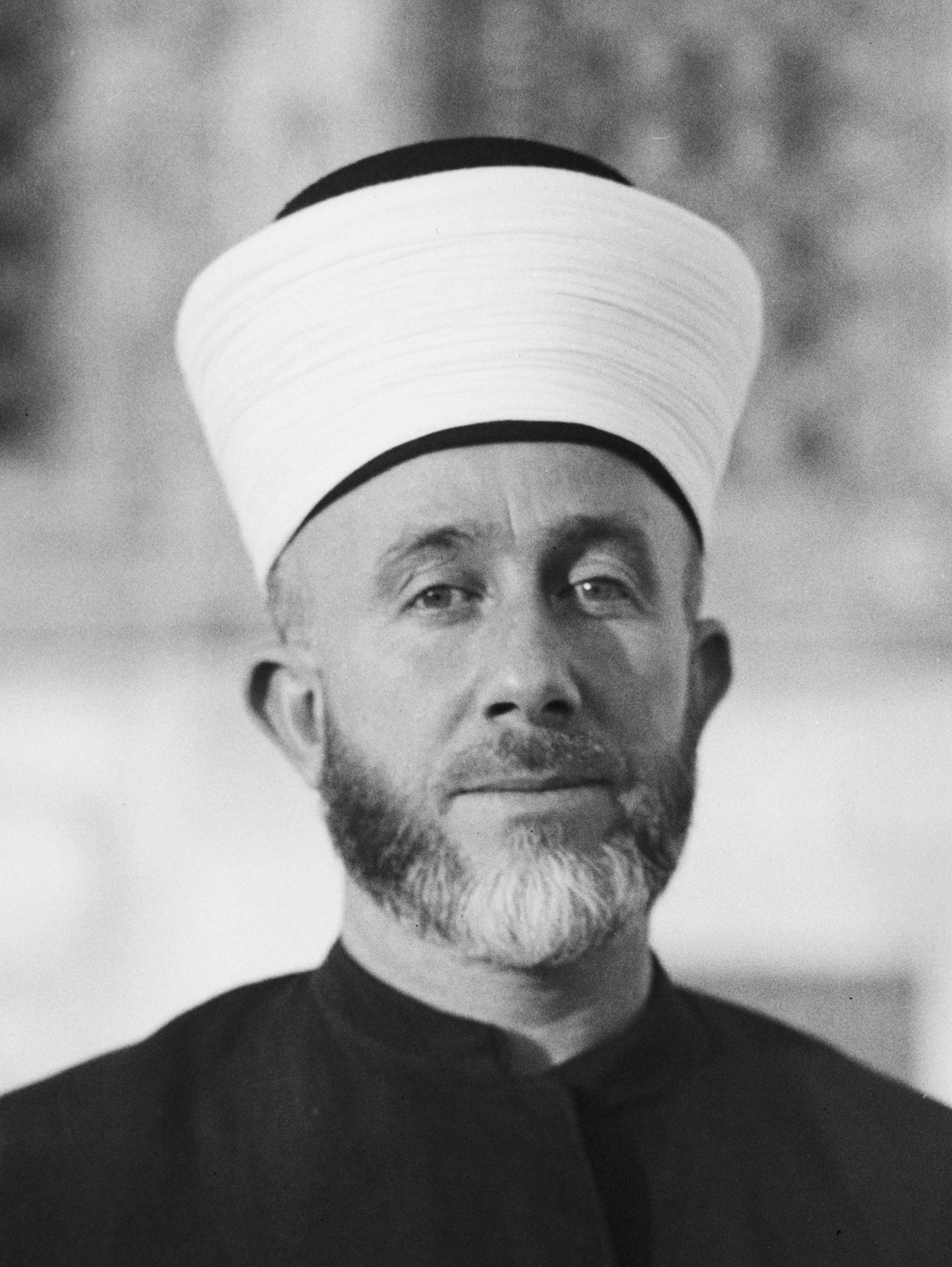
The late Sheikh Amin al-Husseini, former Grand Mufti of Jerusalem, wearing al-Azhar attire in the style used in the Levant.

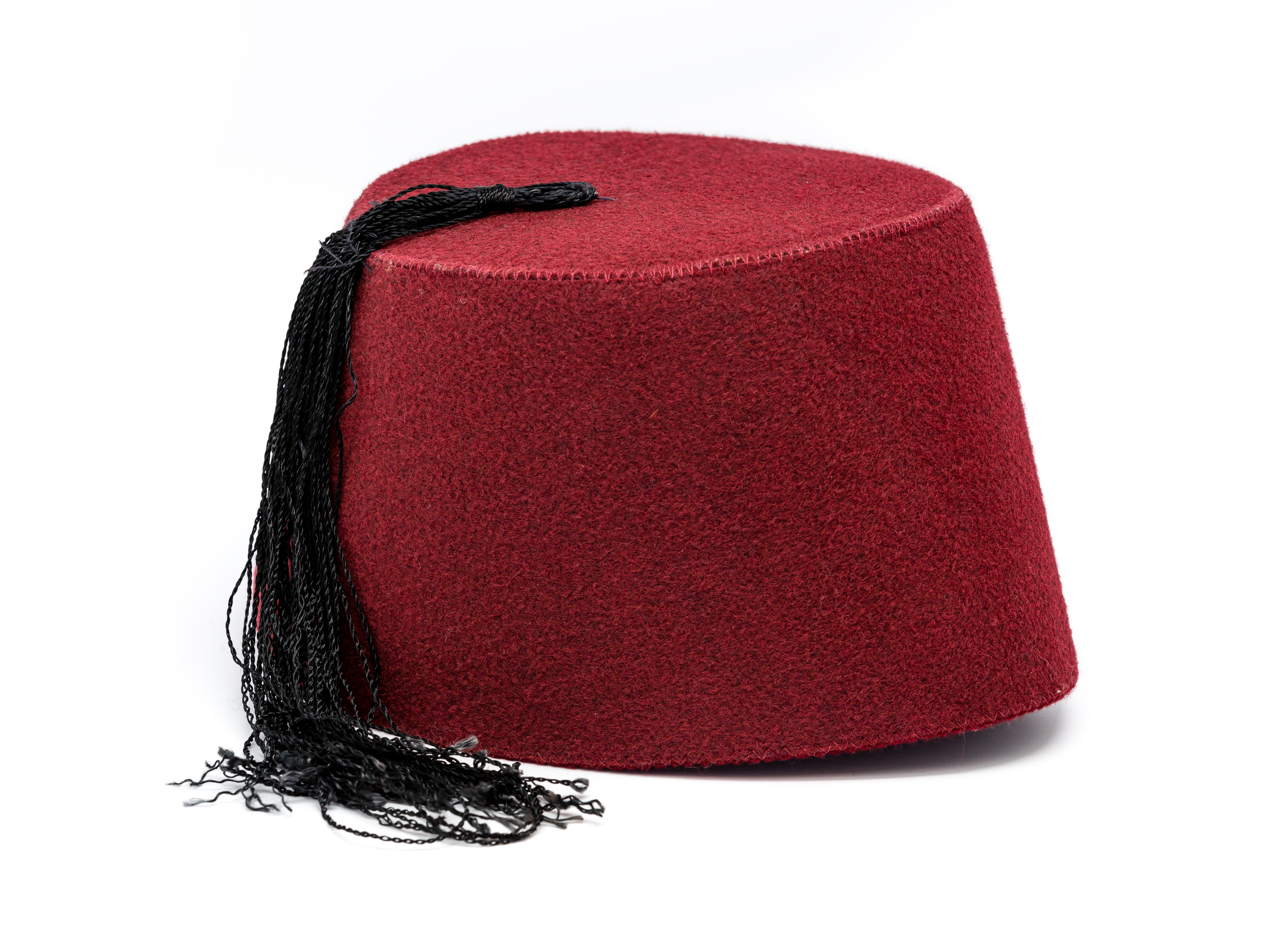
Fez, the main component of the Azhar turban.

== The Kaftan and Jubbah ==
The body garment consists of two main integrated parts:

- Inner layer: Kaftan
- Outer Layer: Jubbah

== Related events ==
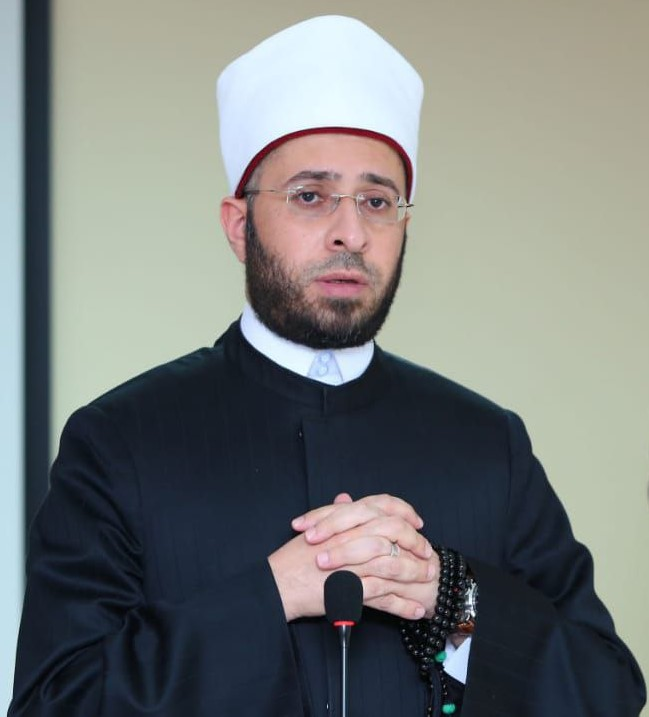
Dr. Osama al-Azhari, Egyptian Minister of Endowments, wearing his Azhar attire.

- National struggle: The Azhar turban was a symbol of the gathering of Egyptians in resistance against the French campaign in Egypt in 1798, the Urabi revolt, and the 1919 Revolution against the British occupation.
- The 1928 rebellion: This year saw the first official rebellion by students of al-Azhar's secondary section against wearing the "galabeya" under the kakoula, as they demanded replacing it with a Western-style suit, which was met with rejection and strictness from al-Azhar administration at the time.
- More recently, in the late twentieth century, the attire faced competition from other outfits (such as the short galabeya with the Gulf shemagh) preferred by supporters of the Salafi trend, who criticized al-Azhar attire as a "government uniform." The Egyptian Ministry of Endowments currently issues al-Azhar attire regularly to imams to preserve the visual identity of religious scholars, and it prohibits its wearing by anyone other than those affiliated with al-Azhar.

== See also ==
- Al-Azhar
- Fez
