= Muhammad al-Jizawi =

Egyptian religious scholar

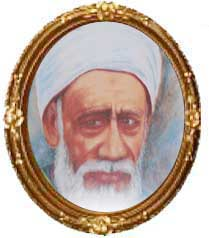

Muhammad al-Jizawi (1874–1927) was an Egyptian religious scholar. He was Grand Imam of al-Azhar from 1917 until 1927, an eventful time in Islam and the modern history of Al-Azhar University. Under his tenure he witnessed Egypt's 1919 revolution, and the abolition of the Caliphate; the 1924 King Fuad I Edition of the Qur’an was published; and the Supreme Council of al-Azhar sentenced Ali Abdel Raziq to exclusion from the Ulama. Abdel Raziq's brother would later become Grand Imam.

Al-Jizawi was born in El-Warraq, Giza Governorate. He was from the Mālikī school, one of the four major schools of thought (madhhab) of Islamic jurisprudence within Sunni Islam.

The promotion of the Turkish language Quran necessitated consideration of the lawfulness of any translation from Classical Arabic. Al-Jizawi argued against translation citing traditional law prohibiting travelling with the holy book to the lands of unbelievers lest the Quran should fall into their hands.

In March 1924 he formed the Greater Committee for Religious Knowledge in direct response to the collapse of the Caliphate and the issue of preaching in such an environment. Others included Shaikh Mustafa al-Maraghi. A resolution was adopted:

Whereas the Caliphate in Islam implies general control of the spiritual and temporal affairs of Islam; whereas the Turkish Government deprived the Caliph Abdul Mejid of his temporal powers, thereby disqualifying him from becoming Caliph in the sense that Islam required; seeing that in principle the Caliph is destined to be the representative of the Prophet, safeguarding everything concerning Islam, which necessarily means the Caliph should be subject of respect, veneration and obedience; and whereas the Caliph Abdul Mejid no longer possesses such qualifications and has not even the power to live in his native land; now therefore it has been decided to convene an Islamic conference in which all Muslim nations shall be represented in order to consider who should be appointed Caliph...

The Cairo Caliphate conference was eventually scheduled for May 1926 under al-Jizawi's presidency. Issues were the history of the Caliphate, the qualifications of a Caliph. The conference clashed with the Wahabi inspired Muslim Congress, scheduled for that year in Mecca. Muhammad ibn Abd al-Wahhab had founded a military movement, based on Hanbali theology, opposing the Ottoman Sultanate as illegitimate. The Indian Caliphate Committee had indicated their intention to send delegates to Mecca.

On his death, Muhammad al-Jizawi was succeeded by Al-Maraghi.
