= Islamic religious leaders =

Religious leadership in Islamic social circles

Islamic religious leaders have traditionally been people who, as part of the clerisy, mosque, or government, have performed a prominent role within their community or nation. However, in the modern context of Muslim minorities in non-Muslim countries, as well as secularised Muslim states like Turkey and Bangladesh, the religious leadership may take a variety of informal shapes.

Compared to other Abrahamic faiths, Islam has no clergy. Instead, their religious leaders are said to resemble rabbis and not priests. Unlike Catholic priests, they do not "serve as intermediaries between mankind and God", nor do they have "process of ordination" or "sacramental functions", but instead serve as "exemplars, teachers, judges, and community leaders," providing religious rules to the pious on "even the most minor and private" matters.

== Alim ==
(ʿĀlim). Ulama (/ˈuːləˌmɑː/; Arabic: علماء ʿUlamāʾ, singular عالِم Scholar) are leaders of religious sciences. In its narrow sense it refers to scholars of Islamic Jurisprudence. In the broader sense, it refers to those who have studied a broad range of essentially Islamic disciplines for several years, for example the hadith and the muhaddith. They represent the Ijmah, or Islamic consensus of the Ummah on religious issues; this does not mean that there can be no disputes - far from it - but they should be aware of what counts as the main consensual opinion, of other dissenting views and their objections.

== Allamah ==
Allamah is an honorary and prestigious title carried by only the very highest scholars of Islamic thought, jurisprudence, and philosophy. It is used as an honorific in Sunni Islam as well as in Shia Islam. Allamah is a leader for the Islamic faith.

== Almami ==
"Almami" is a title of West African Muslim rulers, used especially in the conquest states of the 19th century.

== Caliph ==
Caliph was first used, in the 7th century AD, for Abu Bakr, who was elected head of the Muslim community after the Prophet Muhammad's death.

== Imam ==
Imam is an Arabic word meaning "Leader". The ruler of a country might be called the Imam, for example. The term, however, has important connotations in the Islamic tradition especially in Shia belief. In Sunni belief, the term is used for the founding scholars of the four Sunni madhhabs, or schools of religious jurisprudence (fiqh).

It is commonly used to refer to the one that leads the prayers at the mosques. Meanwhile, in Brunei, Singapore and Malaysia, those who lead any prayers in any places such as at home, are also called imam.

== Grand Imam ==
The "Grand Imam" or "Imam of imams" (Arabic: الإمام الأكبر) of the Al-Azhar Mosque and Al-Azhar University is a prestigious Sunni Islam title and a prominent official title in Egypt. It is considered by Muslims in some countries to indicate the highest authority in Sunni Islam for Islamic jurisprudence, The grand Imam holds a great influence on followers of the theological Ash'ari and Maturidi traditions worldwide, while the defenders of the Athari and Salafi ideologies find their leaders in the Arabian Peninsula. The concept of Imam has its origins in the Quran. Ibrahim was promoted as Imam after his successful sacrifice. Every person at the day of judgement will also be called by their Imam. And there is an Imam e Mubeen who encompasses the whole universe as per the teachings of the Quran.

== Ghazi ==
Ghazi was an individual who participated in ghazw, meaning military expeditions or raiding.

== Grand Mufti ==
The title of "Grand Mufti" (Arabic: مفتي عام) refers to the highest official of religious law in some Muslim countries.

== Muezzin ==
Muezzin (the word is pronounced this way in Turkish, Urdu, etc.; in Arabic, it is muathi [mu-a-thin] مؤذن [mʊʔæðːɪn]) is any person at the mosque who makes the adhan, or athan (call to prayer) for the Friday prayer service and the five daily prayers, or salat. Some mosques have specific places for the adhan to be made from, such as a minaret or a designated area in the mosque. Major mosques usually have a person who is called the "servant of the mosque". He usually is the person who performs the athan. In the case of small mosques, the imam of the mosque would perform the athan.

== Mujtahid ==
Mujtahids are interpreters of the Qur'an and Hadith, the Islamic scriptures. These were traditionally Muftis who used interpretation (ijtihad) to clarify Islamic law, but in many modern secular contexts, Islamic law is no longer the law of the land. In that case, the traditional Mufti may well be replaced by a university or madrasa professor who informally functions as adviser to the local Muslim community in religious matters such as inheritance, divorce, etc.

== Kyai ==
Kyai or Kiai is a title originally used in Javanese culture. Only a male person is called with this appellation. His wife is called "nyai". In early modern times it is mainly used for the headmaster of an Islamic Boarding School (in Indonesia known as pondok pesantren). However, nowadays it is common in Indonesia to call any elderly preacher from any cultural background with this title.

Due to animistic belief of ancient Javanese people, the title "Kyai" is also used to call almost all persons and things venerated. Therefore, it is also common too for kris, weapons, gamelan, trees and certain venerated cattles.

== Titles used only by Shia Muslims ==
=== Ayatollah ===
Ayatollah (Arabic: آية الله; Persian: آیت‌الله) is a prestigious title given to major Shia clergymen. Ayatollah means "sign of God"; those who carry it are considered experts in Islamic studies.

=== Grand Ayatollah ===
Only a few of the most important ayatollah of one of the ayatollahs^{(clarify, cite source)} refer to him in many situations and ask him to publish his Juristic book in which he answers the vast majority of daily Muslim affairs. The book is called Resalah, which is usually a reinvention of the book Al-Urwatu l-Wuthqah, according to their knowledge of the most authentic Islamic sources and their application to current life.

== See also ==
- Succession to Muhammad
- List of caliphs
- List of grand imams of al-Azhar
- List of maraji
