= Clerical clothing =

Distinctive clothing worn by clergy

Clerical clothing is non-liturgical clothing worn exclusively by clergy. It is distinct from vestments in that it is not reserved specifically for use in the liturgy. Practices vary: clerical clothing is sometimes worn under vestments, and sometimes as the everyday clothing or street wear of a priest, minister, or other clergy member.

In modern times, many Christian clergy have adopted the use of a shirt with a clerical collar; but the use of clerical clothing is most commonly among Catholic, Evangelical-Lutheran, Anglican, Oriental Orthodox, and Eastern Orthodox clergy.

== Christianity ==
=== Catholicism ===
Already in the fifth century, clerics were directed to dress according to their profession and should not wear decorated shoes or vestments. The council of Aachen in 816 specified that, following the teachings of the Church Fathers, clergy should "refrain from excessive and ostentatious dress". According to the East Frankish Council of Tribur in the late ninth century, the stole was an acknowledged public marker of clerical status and clergy was incentivised to wear it. Though in the following centuries episcopal legislation continued to order that the clergy should distinguish itself not only by their general moral behaviour but also their dress, the clerical reformers in the eleventh centuries paid little attention to clerical dress. The need for distinctive clerical dress emerged only again in late eleventh century Italy at the council of Melfi in 1089.

The issue of clerical dress was then addressed again in several synods in France as well as in the Second Lateran Council in 1139. Here, the assembled bishops insisted that, as the clergy was supposed to act as an example for the laity, a humble and modest dress was important for that mission. In 1215, the Fourth Lateran Council made it mandatory for all the Christian clergy to wear distinctive dress. Its purpose was not necessary to elevate the status of the Christian clerics; it was intended that they would catch the public eye if any member of the clergy is seen on the street. However, the rules at the time were not the same as the modern rules, and the rules vary by jurisdiction.

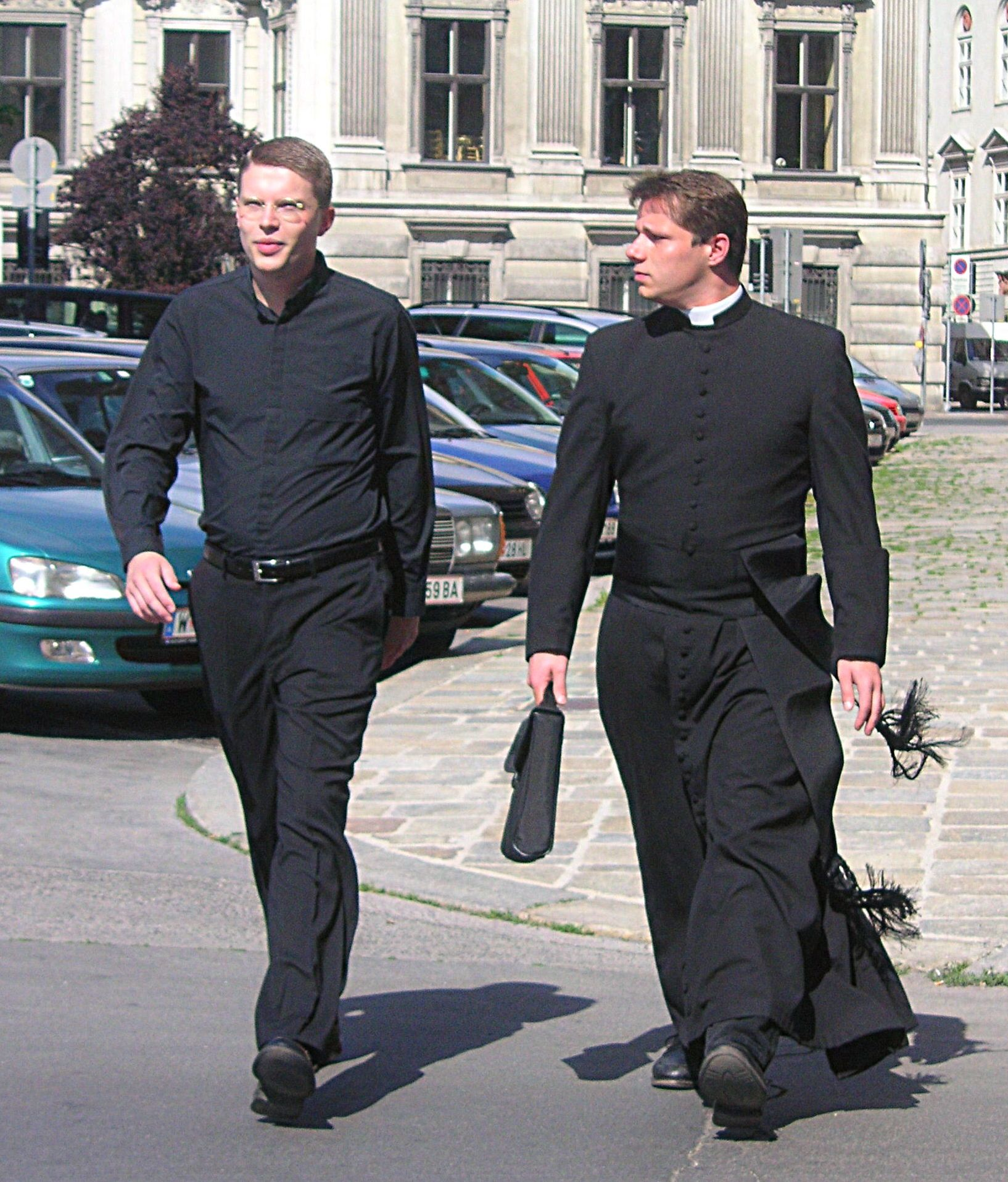
On the right, an example of the full collared shirt and cassock; on the left, a clerical shirt that could have a tab collar inserted.

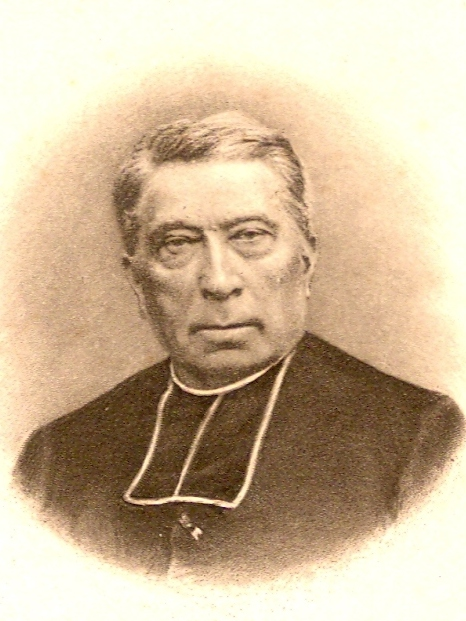
The rabat, worn until the early 20th century.

- Cassock: A long-sleeved, hoodless garment. Depending on the climate it can be made of very lightweight material or heavy wool. In tropical climates white is worn. This is the norm for secular clergy and members of religious institutes. Some religious societies such as the Jesuits and Redemptorists wear their own style of the cassock. Monks and friars wear a habit that can differ considerably from the cassock. Cassocks are generally ankle-length. The color is black for priests, black with purple piping for canons, black with magenta piping for monsignors, black with amaranth red piping for bishops; and black with scarlet red for cardinals. The Roman Pontiff wears a white cassock. Monsignors, bishops and cardinals have what is known as a "choir cassock" for liturgical occasions but this is not worn for everyday wear.
- Ferraiolo: A full-length cape reaching to the ankles. This is only worn with the cassock on formal morning dress or white tie occasions.
- Cape: A covering for the cassock in cold weather.
- Greca (clothing) (douillette): An overcoat covering the cassock.
- Hat: zucchetto, biretta, or cappello romano depending on circumstance.
- Clerical collar: There are a variety of options for daily clerical attire, all involving the use of a clerical collar:
  - Collarino (tab collar): This is probably the most common type of shirt and collar among Roman-rite Catholic clergy. It resembles a standard dress shirt but has a standing black collar that is sewn to accommodate a white cloth or soft plastic insert, leaving a small white square at the base of the throat.
  - Neckband: A collarless shirt (similar to a banded collar shirt) tailored to accommodate a strip of linen or plastic that, when worn over the shirt, creates a standing white collar that rings the neck. This detachable collar is fastened with collar stays or buttons. These shirts and detachable collars were originally intended to be worn underneath a waistcoat, rabat, or cassock. Today these shirts are almost invariably black poly-cotton, but when worn under a waistcoat or rabat are usually white and made of a higher quality oxford cotton weave.
  - Clerical waistcoat or rabat: Clerical waistcoats or rabats are the most traditional and formal item of clerical costume. They are almost always black and are made of worsted wool. Clerical waistcoats generally sport silk backing. They are worn over a neckband shirt and a detachable collar to create a cassock-like appearance about the neck. Unlike the waistcoats that accompany suits, they button all the way to the collar. The rabat is a late innovation, and exactly mirrors the clerical waistcoat, except that it is backless.

=== Eastern Christianity ===
In the Eastern Catholic Churches and Eastern Orthodox Churches a useful distinction between liturgical vestments and clerical clothing is that vestments are required to be blessed before being worn. Conversely, clerical clothing is not, and is regarded as daily wear.

- Inner cassock: The inner cassock (or simply, cassock) is a floor-length garment, usually black, worn by all clergy members, monastics, and seminarians.
- Outer cassock: Called a ryasa (Russian: ряса) or exorason, the outer cassock is a large flowing garment worn over the inner cassock by bishops, priests, deacons, and monastics.
- Skufia: A soft-sided cap worn by monastics or awarded to clergy as a mark of honor.
- Kamilavka: A stiff hat worn by monastics or awarded to clergy as a mark of honor.
- Apostolnik: A veil worn either by nuns, either alone or with a skufia.
- Epanokamelavkion: A veil extending over the back, worn with the kamilavka by all monastics and bishops.
- Klobuk: A kamilavka with an epanokamelavkion permanently attached; more common in the Russian tradition.

==== Eastern Orthodox examples ====
Bishop	Priest (married or celibate priest)	Hieromonk (monk and priest in one person)	Priest with grey zostikon, a Kontorasson and wearing a Skufia.	Monk in an exorasson	Reader/Subdeacon/Deacon dressed in the zostikon

- Married priests can wear an exorasson or zostikon when not celebrating Liturgy and may opt to wear the more informal skufia over the more formal kalimavkin. They may also wear a vest called a kontorasson, usually during colder weather. The colors of their cassocks vary between the typical black, grey and blue.
- Monks, hieromonks & bishops all wear the klobuk as part of their mark of celibacy. Some monks will wear the zostikon, kontorasson and skufia when doing daily work around a monastery.
- Readers & subdeacons rarely wear a cassock outside of church but are often required to wear one in church when not serving.
- In the Greek tradition, chanters will often wear an exorasson directly over their secular clothing (i.e. without an inner cassock/anteri) during liturgical services. A Chanter who is a seminarian, or a tonsured Reader or Subdeacon, may on occasion wear an anteri instead of an exorasson while at the Chanter's Stand.

==== Oriental Orthodox examples ====
Syriac Patriarch	Syriac Bishop	Coptic Priest	Syriac Priest	Syriac Priest (monk)

=== Protestantism ===
==== Anglicanism ====
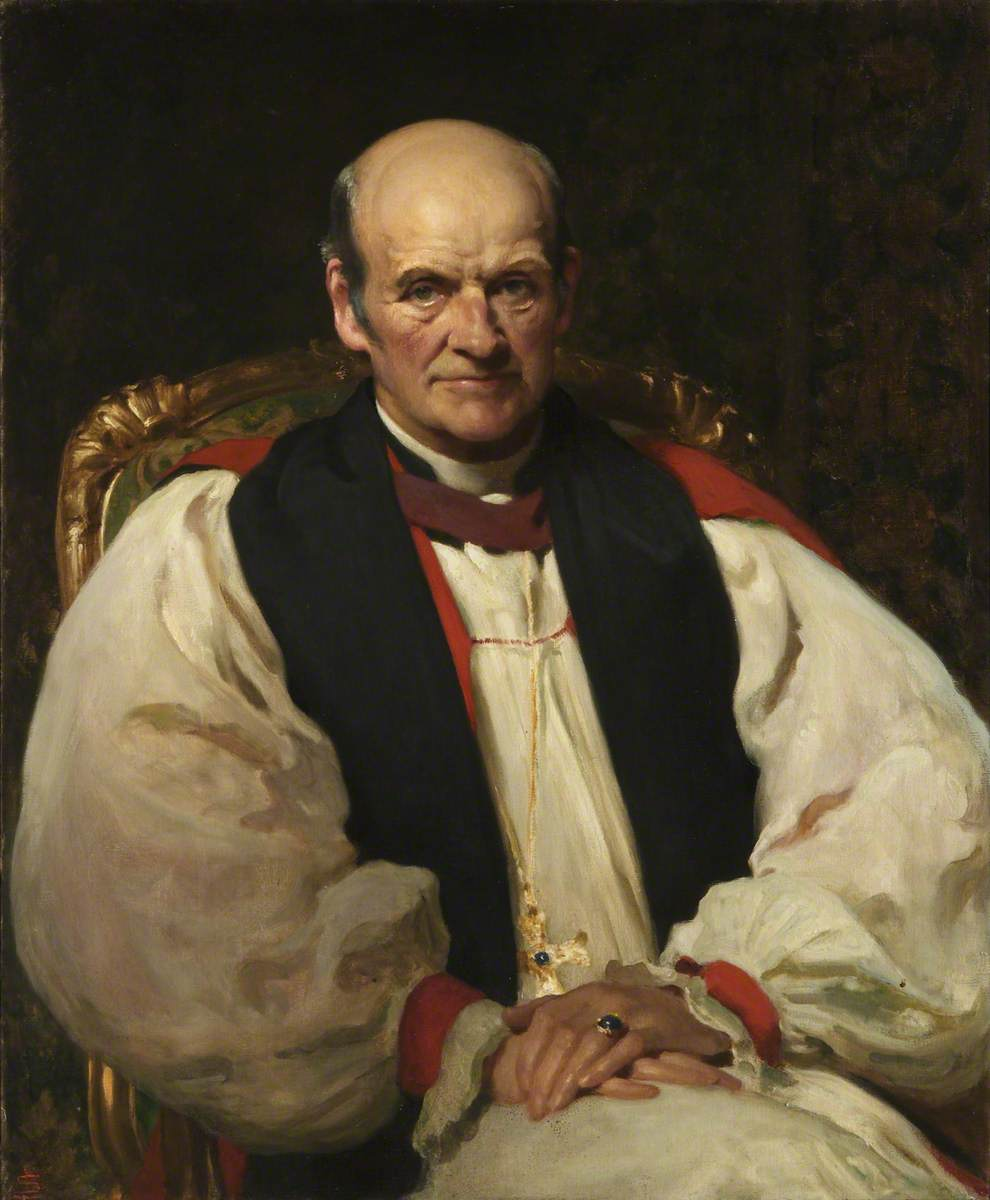
Anglican cassock, rochet, chimere and scarf.

According to the 1604 Canons of the Church of England, the clergy were supposed to wear cassock, gown, and cap whilst going about their duties. The cassock was either double or single-breasted; buttoned at the neck or shoulder and was held at the waist with a belt or cincture. The gown could either be of the special clerical shape – open at the front with balloon sleeves – or the gown of the wearer's degree. This was worn with the Canterbury cap, which gradually stiffened into the familiar 'mortar board' in the course of the 17th and 18th centuries. Cassock and gown were worn as an outdoor dress until the beginning of the nineteenth century, with the Canterbury cap being replaced by the mortarboard or tri-corn hat latterly. Increasingly, though, ordinary men's clothing in black, worn with a white shirt and either a black or white cravat, replaced the dress prescribed by the Canons.

In the 19th century, it was fashionable among gentlemen to wear a detachable collar which was washed and starched separately from the shirt. Initially, with the detachable collar, Anglican clergy wore a white cravat, later a white bow tie, with a waistcoat with a standing collar and a loose clerical frock coat resembling a knee-length cassock with multiple buttons to waist level. Alternatively, they could wear the normal style of gentleman's frock coat and a rabat (see above). In the earlier part of the century, Evangelicals often wore 'swallow tail' coats to distinguish themselves from the high church clergy who favoured the frock coat. This distinction is mentioned as late as 1857 when it is alluded to in Anthony Trollope's Barchester Towers. In the middle of the century, Anglican clergy began turning the collar around backward, creating the first versions of the "dog collar". This form of distinctive dress was seen as a controversial affectation of the high church party, but as time progressed the collar-turned-backward became more common and even survived the demise of detachable collars among the general public. Although the black waistcoat has given way to a black shirt, the collar has become a daily part of a clerical costume for most Anglican clergy. However, some Anglican clergy join with ministers of reformed churches in eschewing distinctive clerical costumes entirely.

During the 20th century, Anglican bishops began wearing purple (officially violet) shirts as a sign of their office. Along with the pectoral cross and episcopal ring, this marks them off from other clergy in appearance. While there is no law among the churches of the Anglican Communion that prevents other members of the clergy from wearing a purple shirt, to do so is generally not considered appropriate.

Until the Regency period, Anglican clergy regularly wore the cassock in public. After enjoying something of a revival in the mid-20th century, this custom is again less common. The traditional Anglican headwear with the cassock was the Canterbury cap, which is now seldom used. Many Anglo-Catholic clergy still wear the biretta. From the mid-18th century, bishops and archdeacons traditionally wore a shortened version of the cassock, called an apron (which hung just above the knee), along with breeches and gaiters. The gaiters, buttoned up the side, would cover the trouser leg to a point just below the knee. This form of everyday vesture, common up until the 1960s, is now almost extinct. (This was appropriate for them in the time when some of their travelling would be on horseback but continued into the middle of the 20th century.)

Some Anglican clergy favour a double-breasted cassock (known as a Sarum cassock), often with an external button at chest level on which to hook an academic hood (which is worn as part of the choir habit). However, many clergy, especially most Anglo-Catholic clergy, choose the single breasted cassock. Like Roman Catholic clergy, some Anglican clergy wear the fascia (known within Anglicanism as a cincture) around the waist, while others prefer a belt. Where extra protection from the elements is needed a cloak may be worn over the cassock.

Clergy of the Royal Peculiars, senior chaplains to the forces, members of the Chapels Royal and honorary chaplains to the King may wear a scarlet cassock and a special badge (the King's cipher surmounted by St Edward's crown surrounded by oak and laurel leaves) on their scarf.

It has been mentioned above that the headcover normally worn with the cassock is the biretta (for Roman Catholics) or the Canterbury Cap (for Anglicans). In the 19th century, like most men of the time, clergy wore the tall silk (top) hat with their outdoor dress and this remained traditional for bishops and other senior clergy for many years. However many clergy preferred to wear the cappello romano, a distinctive broad brimmed round topped hat resembling a low crowned bowler and this remained popular until World War I, when it tended to be substituted by the dark or black Homburg style hat worn by many professional men until more recent times.

==== Lutheranism ====
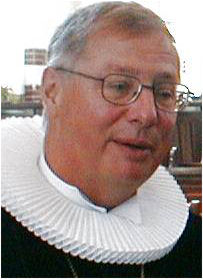
The ruff, as worn by a Danish Lutheran bishop.

Lutheran clerical clothing varies depending on locality and denomination. The clerical clothing of Lutheran pastors and bishops often mirrors that of Catholic clergy: clerical shirt and a detachable clerical collar.

In Scandinavia, but also in Germany, Lutheran bishops usually wear a pectoral cross. Danish clergy will wear a black cassock, as in Anglican and Catholic traditions, but with a distinctive ruff. Pastors in the old Hanseatic towns of Hamburg and Lübeck may also wear ruff ("Halskrause" in German). The ruff is a large collar, stiffly starched, worn over the top of a full clerical collar. Until the 1980s, this used to be the custom in Norway also, and was a relic of the period when Denmark-Norway had shared a common monarchy (1384-1814). In Sweden, a distinctive form of frock coat (called kaftan) was worn by the clergy, and is still seen on formal occasions when it is worn with a stand-up collar and short bands. German pastors usually wear a black gown with two white preaching tabs when conducting services. For non-liturgical events, they wear ordinary clothing or a clerical shirt and collar. For more formal occasions they may wear a black Lutherrock, a form of frock coat.

In the U.S., Lutheran clergy often a clerical color with a buttoned-down shirt (various colors) is worn with dress slacks or a skirt.

==== Presbyterianism ====
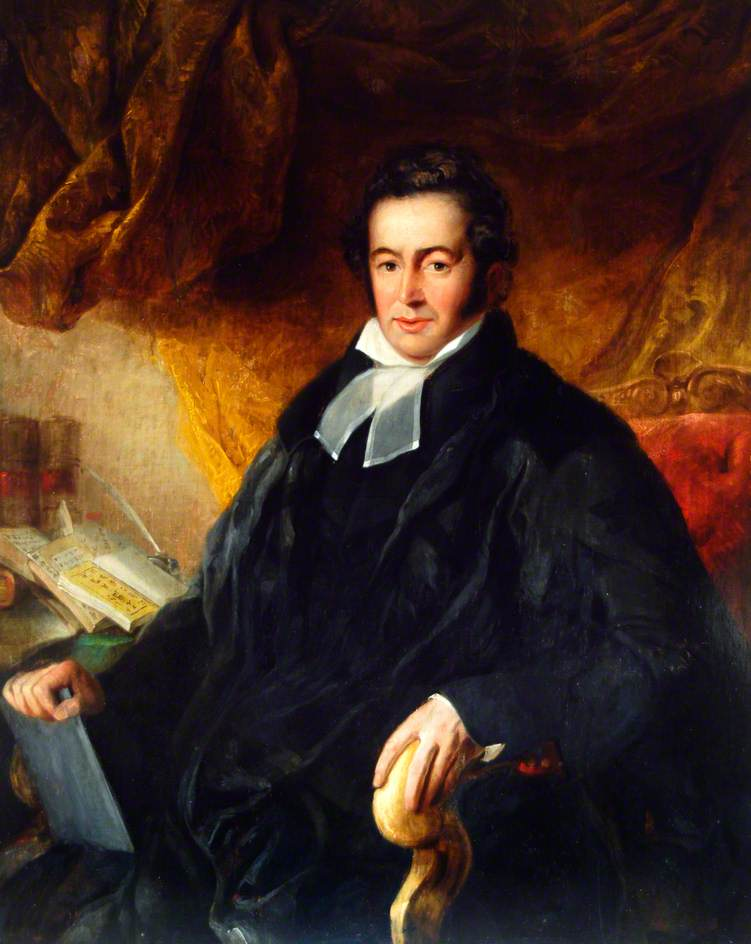
A Geneva gown worn with preaching bands.

Most traditional Presbyterian churches, whether in mainline American denominations like the PC (USA) or evangelical like the PCA, have departed wearing the Geneva gown which came from John Calvin's attire preaching in Geneva. Many now will wear cassocks with perhaps another robe and clerical tabs. However, other Presbyterians also will wear cassocks. This is also common practice among Canadian Presbyterians and the Church of Scotland.

===== Scotland =====
In the Church of Scotland, the mother church for the mainline Presbyterian Church, the Minister will wear clerical vestments. Generally, a black or colored gown is worn over a cassock with preaching neck bands and stoles. However more and more colored and ornate vestments are worn in the Church of Scotland. In fact, most all of the ministers of the Church of Scotland wear reverse collars and ornate vestments.

In both the American and the Scottish churches, many of the ministers will wear clerical collars with their suits. Again this is very common in the PCUSA and to a lesser degree in PCA and other Presbyterian denominations. In the Church of Scotland, this is a very common practice with the ministers.

==== Methodism ====
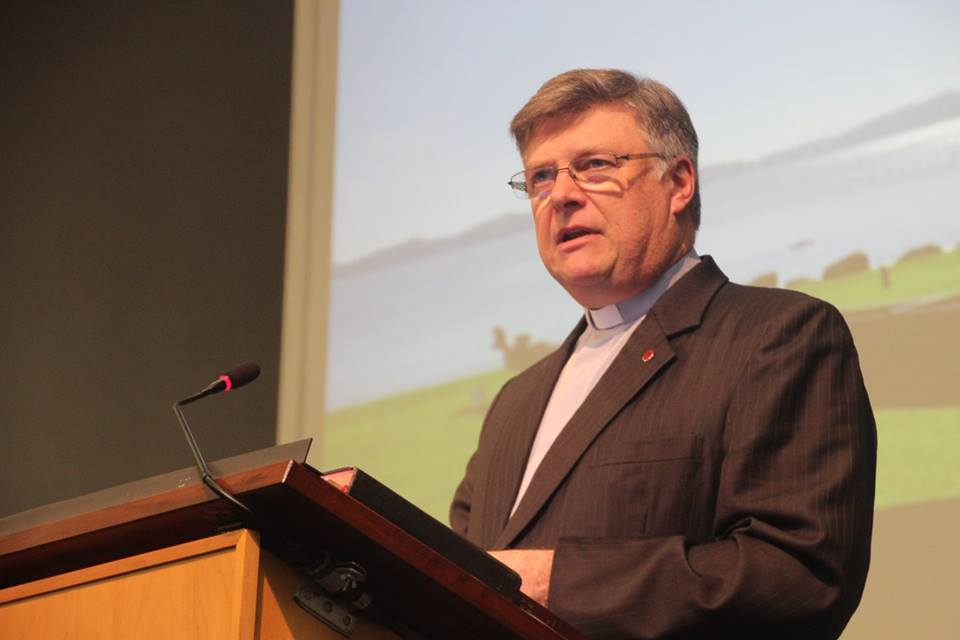
A clerical collar worn with a modern western suitcoat.

===== United Kingdom =====
In British Methodism, a minister (presbyter) often wears a simple business suit with a coloured shirt and clerical collar. For more formal services a minister will adopt a cassock with bands. For ceremonial and very formal occasions, such as the Remembrance Day service at the Cenotaph in London, a traditional black Geneva preaching gown, academic hood and bands may be worn.

Methodist deacons (male or female) have a less strict dress code; but they often wear dark blue clothing, and always wear the pectoral cross of their religious order.

===== United States =====
Clerical garb in the Global Methodist Church, United Methodist Church, Free Methodist Church and other Methodist denominations differs from the British norms. There are no official rules on vestments or clerical clothing. Therefore, use of clerical clothing by Methodist clergy varies greatly by location and situation. Methodist clergy frequently wear clerical clothing on pastoral visits at hospitals and nursing facilities. When worn, elders will most frequently wear black or blue clerical shirts, while bishops will wear purple.

== Islam ==
=== Sunni Islam ===
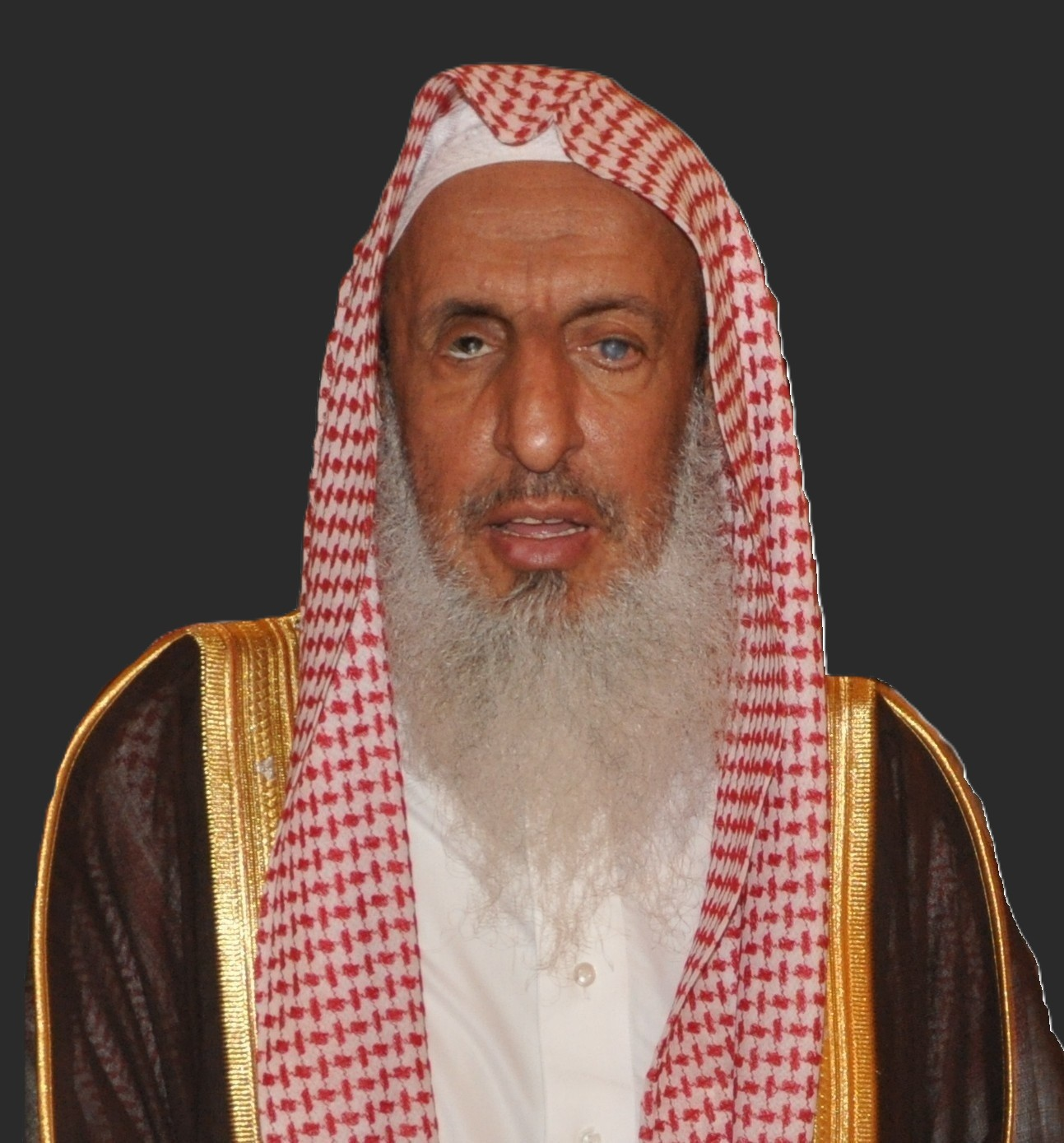
Former Grand Mufti of Saudi Arabia, Abdulaziz Al al-Sheikh, is pictured wearing a traditional Arab headdress and thobe

==== Hadith ====
Sunni hadith does not lay out a specific outfit for ulema as institutional ulema did not exist in its modern comprehensive form during the time of the Prophet Muhammad. Nonetheless, some descriptions of his clothing exist. One mentions three distinct cloths of "Jubbah", "Qabaa", and "Faruj" in the same narration.

==== Fiqh ====
In the Mawsu`at al-Fiqhiyyah it is stated that Hanafis and Shafis recommend scholars to wear "splendid and spacious clothing".

==== Modern Examples ====
The scholars of the Egyptian Islamic institution of Al-Azhar wear a two layer outfit in some occasions, mentioned traditionally as the inner "kaftan" and outer "jubbah".

=== Shia Islam ===
==== Hadith ====
Similarly, Shia hadith does not necessarily lay out a specific outfit for ulema, as institutionalized ulema did not exist in a modern comprehensive form during the time of the Prophet Muhammad. Nonetheless, some descriptions or narrations of his clothing do exist. One mentions him wearing a tunic of brocade, while another mentions him having worn the "Shamlah" and the "Namirah".

==== Fiqh ====
Shia jurist Al-Sistani has stated that it is advised for the prayer imam to wear a cloak that rests on the shoulders. It can be inferred that Shia clergy follow the same advice.

==== Modern Examples ====
Modern Shia clergy often wear a three layer outfit, in the order of Dashdasha, Qabaa, Abaa.

Shia clergy wear a round turban known as an ammameh. Those who are sayyid may wear black turbans, while others wear white turbans.

== See also ==
- Choir dress
- List of liturgical vestments
