= Muhammad al-Kharashi =

Egyptian Azhar Islamic theologian (1601–1690)

- محمد الخرشي

Grand Imam of Al-Azhar
- In office 1679–1690
- Preceded by: Position Established
- Succeeded by: Ibrahim al-Barmawi

Personal life
- Born: 1010 AH (1601/1602 CE) Abu Kharash, Beheira Governorate
- Died: 1690 (aged 88–89) Cairo, Egypt
- Main interests: Arabic language; Qur'anic interpretation (tafsir); Hadith (prophetic traditions); Fiqh (Islamic jursprudence); Following the Malikite school and logic (mantiq)
- Education: Al Azhar University
- Occupation: Grand Imam; Islamic Scholar; Theologian

Religious life
- Religion: Islam
- Denomination: Sunni
- Jurisprudence: Maliki

Muslim leader
- Influenced by: Jamal Al-Din Abdullah bin Ali Al-Kharashi (father)
- Influenced: Abdel-Baqi Al-Qalini, Ibrahim Musa Al-Fayoumi

Abu Abd Allah Muhammad ibn Abd Allah ibn Ali al-Kharashi (Arabic: محمد الخرشي; 1010 A.H./1601 C.E. – 1101 A.H./1690 C.E.) was an Egyptian cleric, author and Islamic scholar who was reportedly the first Grand Imam of the Al-Azhar Mosque in Cairo.

Al-Kharshi is considered to be a leading Muslim scholar, well known in his time throughout the Arab World and into other Islamic kingdoms in Africa.

== Biography ==
=== Early life and education ===
Al-Kharshi was born in 1010 AH (1601 AD), and resided in Cairo. He was called Al-Kharashi (also known as Al-Kharaashi), because he came from the village of Abu Kharash in the Buhaira Governorate.

Al-Kharshi was educated by a group of scholars and figures, including his father, Jamal Al-Din Abdullah bin Ali Al-Kharshi, who instilled in Al-Kharshi a love for science and an aspiration for knowledge. Al-Kharshi was also instructed by Al-Ajhouri, Yusuf Al-Ghalayshi, Abdul Muti Al-Basir, and Yassin Al-Shami.

Al-Kharshi studied the sciences of Al-Azhar established at that time, such as: interpretation, hadith, monotheism, mysticism, jurisprudence, theology, grammar, morphology, presentations, meanings and statement, badi’, literature, history, and the Prophet’s biography, and also studied the sciences of Logic, setting and the times.

=== Al-Kharshi students ===
- Ahmed Al-Laqani
- Muhammad Al-Zarqani
- Ali Al-Laqani
- Shams Al-Din Al-Laqani
- Daoud Al-Laqani
- Muhammad Al-Nafrawi
- Ahmed Al-Nafrawi
- Al-Shabrakhiti
- Ahmed Al-Fayoumi
- Abdel-Baqi Al-Qalini (fourth sheik of Al-Azhar)
- Ibrahim bin Musa Al-Fayoumi (sixth Sheikh of Al-Azhar)
- Ahmed Al-Mashrafi
- Ali Al-Majdouli
- Abu Hamid Al-Damiati
- Shams Al-Din Al-Basir Al-Sakandari
- Abu Al-Abbas Al-Derbi, (a Sheikh of Al-Azhar)

=== His Characteristics ===
Al-Kharshi was described as being modest, chaste, well mannered, and generous. He was eager to teach and patient with his students. He spent much time fasting and praying, and was not concerned with his material wellbeing. When Al-Kharshi received gifts from foreign dignitaries, he would pass them on to his friends to distribute to others.

Ali Al-Sa’idi Al-Adawi Al-Maliki said about him in his footnote, which he put on his small explanation of Matn Khalil:

He is the scholar, the imam and the archetypal role model, the sheikh of the Malikis in the east and the west, the role model for those who walk, foreign and Arab, the educator of the devotees, the cave of the walkers, Sidi Abu Abdullah bin Ali Al-Kharshi.

He says about him from the tenth of his tenth:

We did not catch an hour in which he was oblivious to the interests of his religion or his world, and if he entered his house, he used to turban with a white woolen scarf, and he did not get bored in his lesson from asking a question, it is necessary to read, especially after his Sheikh Al-Burhan Al-Laqani, and Abu Al-Diya’ Ali Al-Ajhouri.

Al-Kharshi used to divide the text of Khalil in the Maliki jurisprudence into two halves:

- first half he would recite in the afternoon at the pulpit like the recitation of the Qur’an,
- second half he would be read the next day at his personal retreat

=== After Sheikh of Al-Azhar ===
Al-Jabarti said about Al-Kharshi:

He is the eminent scholar, the sheikh of Islam and Muslims and the inheritor of the sciences of the master of the messengers. His fame also spread in the Islamic countries until he reached the countries of the Maghreb and Central Africa until Nigeria, the Levant, the Arabian Peninsula and Yemen, and the Sheikh enabled him to reach this fame by the spread of his students and their large number. In many countries, and his fame for science and piety.

Al-Muradi in Selk Al-Durar said about Al-Kharshi:

The Imam Al-Faqih, with the Wahabbi sciences and satisfactory morals, agreed on his virtue, his guardianship, and his good conduct.

He was famous in the Maghreb, the Levant, the Hejaz, and Yemen.

=== Literature ===
Al-Kharshi: was knowledgeable in the interpretation of the Qur’an, and in jurisprudence according to the doctrine of Imam Malik bin Anas

1. A message in the basmalah - an explanation of this verse.
2. The Great Commentary on Matn Khalil, in the Maliki Fiqh,- in eight volumes.
3. The Small Commentary on Khalil's Mukhtasar on the Board of Khalil - in four volumes.
4. The utmost desire to solve the terms of the elites - an explanation of the book by Ibn Hajar al-Asqalani, in the terminology of hadith.
5. Al-fraid Sunni in resolving the words of the Sanusi in monotheism.
6. Al-Anwar al-Qudsi in the Fara’id al-Kharashi,- an explanation of the Minor Senussi doctrine, called Umm al-Barahin.
7. A footnote to the explanation of Sheikh Ali Isagogi on logic - a book on logic.

=== Sheikh of Al-Azhar ===
The narrations almost unanimously agree that al-Kharshi was the first to take over the position of Sheikh Al-Azhar.

=== Death ===
Al-Kharshi died on Sunday the 27th day of the month of Dhu al-Hijjah in the year (1101 AH – 1690 AD) at age 93. He was buried there in the year 1101 AH (1690 AD).

Religious titles
Preceded by Position Established	Grand Imams of al-Azhar; 1679–1690	Succeeded by Ibrahim al-Barmawi
