= Mahmud Shaltut =

Egyptian Islamic scholar (1893–1963)

- محمود شلتوت
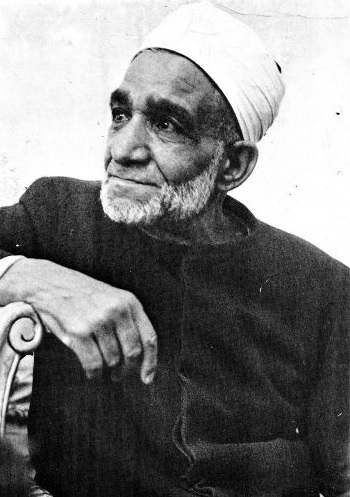

Grand Imam of Al-Azhar
- In office 1958–1963
- Preceded by: Abd al-Rahman Taj
- Succeeded by: Hassan Mamoun

Personal life
- Born: 23 April 1893 Minyat Bani Mansur, Itay El Barud, Khedivate of Egypt
- Died: 13 December 1963 (aged 70) Cairo, Egypt

Religious life
- Religion: Islam
- Denomination: Sunni
- Jurisprudence: Hanafi

Mahmud Shaltut (Note: Arabic: محمود شلتوت, romanized: Maḥmūd Shaltūt) (23 April 1893 – 13 December 1963) was an Egyptian Islamic scholar who served as Grand Imam of Al-Azhar from 1958 until his death in 1963. A disciple of Muhammad Abduh, Shaltut is known for his attempts in Islamic reform.

== Early life ==
Mahmud Shaltut was born on 23 April 1893 in Italberoud, Egypt. He left his hometown in 1906 at age 13 and enrolled in Ma’had Dini of Alexandria, a newly established al-Azhar-affiliated religious institute. Upon completion of his studies in 1918, Shaltut received his Alimiyya Degree (al-Azhar equivalent to the BA) and began teaching at the same institute in 1919. At age thirty four, he was called upon to lecture at the Higher Division of al-Azhar and subsequently transferred to Cairo in 1927.

== Religious career ==
In 1929 Sheikh Muhammad Mustafa al-Maraghi was chosen as rector of al-Azhar University. Al-Maraghi began creating his own reform program and was firmly supported by Shaltut who, several years prior to his transfer to al-Azhar, had created reform ideas of his own concerning al-Azhar. Shaltut's reforms were ones specifically geared toward separating the religious institution from the state.

However, not everyone was keen on change and al-Maraghi's bold ideas quickly brought him down. After a brief one-year posting, al-Maraghi resigned as Grand Imam of al-Azhar and in his place came Sheikh Mohammad al-Ahmadi al-Zawahiri. Unlike al-Maraghi, whom Shaltut viewed as being a proactive leader and reformer, al-Zawahiri was perceived by Shaltut as being reactionary. Shaltut himself was a modernist disciple of Muhammad Abduh and Muhammad Rashid Rida and their influences on him are clearly discernible in his writings, actions, and ideas.

Thus, it was inevitable Shaltut would harbor resistance to al-Zawahiri's passive policies, and therefore, he was consequently dismissed from al-Azhar in September 1931 along with others in what can be conceived as a general purge of those associated with al-Maraghi's reform faction. Shaltut spent his time spent away from al-Azhar working as a lawyer in the Shari’a courts. It was not until al-Maraghi's second appointment in 1935 that Shaltut would return to al-Azhar.

During al-Maraghi's second post at the helm of al-Azhar, which lasted ten years until 1945, Shaltut became Wakil (Vice Dean) of the Kulliyat ash-Shari’a, and in 1937 he attended the Deuxieme Congrès International de Droit Comparé at the Hague, where he was one of only three scholars selected to represent al-Azhar. His speech regarding civil and criminal liability in Islamic law impressed those within al-Azhar circles and thus served to increase his status within the institute.

Later in 1939, Shaltut was appointed as inspector of religious studies and went on to be elected to membership in the Arabic Language Academy in Cairo in 1946. Shaltut's rise to prominence continued and in November 1957 he was selected as Vice Rector. Less than one year later Shaltut was finally given the highest honor and made Shaykh al-Azhar by President Gamal Abdel Nasser in October 1958. Previously, al-Azhar scholars were granted the power to elect the grand imam, but in 1961, after nationalizing the religious institution, Abdel Nasser issued a new al-Azhar Law, limiting the power of the al-Azhar imams and giving the government power to appoint the grand imam. By deepening the ties between the regime and the institution, this allowed the post-1952 revolutionary government of Abdel Nasser to work to integrate education into a unified system and find an ally in Shaltut, who would strive for modernization of curricula and a broader public-service function - at home and abroad - for al-Azhar.

=== As Shaykh al-Azhar: Beliefs, Ideas, and Reforms ===
Shortly after assuming his position as Shaykh al-Azhar, Shaltut announced his vision for reform. Shaltut attempted to prove that shari’a law was not an obstacle to modern society, but rather a guide through the changes modern society brings with it. He was fervently determined to see al-Azhar achieve greater independence from the state's control and worked toward getting the National Assembly to pass declarations such as the Reform Law, which they did in 1961. The Reform Law was aimed at integrating al-Azhar into the wider field of higher education, improving job opportunities for students, and producing modern scholars knowledgeable in matters of the contemporary world and able to serve the Muslim community.

Admiration for Shaltut grew rapidly and his unprecedented decision to undertake regular broadcasts, in which he delivered religious sermons and answered questions from those who had doubts or criticism, only enhanced his reputation. These broadcasts were later published by the Ministry of National Guidance as Ahadith al-Sabah fi’l-Midhya and Yas’aluna (Ask Us).

He also acquired a reputation as a great orator. His capability to communicate well with the masses garnered him many listeners as he spoke of varying issues regarding contemporary Muslim society such as family law, private property, birth control, and polygamy (which he strongly defended), to name a few. In essence, Shaltut believed that the relevance of shari’a law in the modern day was not to be undermined. Also, he viewed his Quranic commentary, or his tafsir, more as practical advice for any literate Muslim rather than a strict scholarly analysis.

== Assessment and legacy ==
Mahmud Shaltut was among the most recognized Islamic scholars in the world. He is particularly remembered for encouraging harmonious interactions between Sunni and Shia Muslims. He maintained close relations with prominent Shia figures such as Seyyed Hossein Borujerdi and zealously campaigned for open discussion and cooperation between the two factions. Shaltut desperately wanted to overcome misconstructions and avoid quarrels between them. Shaltut even went as far as to issue a fatwa which essentially declared that worship according to the Twelver Shia jurisprudence was valid.

Shaltut strove to portray Islam to the world as a religion of unity, flexibility, and moderation. He furiously condemned sectarianism, saint worship, and miracles while promoting tolerance and reason among the Islamic population. Moreover, Shaltut had no concerns accepting socialism and had great pride in his Egyptian nationality while at the same time supporting Arabism.

== Major works ==
1. Tafsir al-Quran al-Karim: al-Adjza al-Ashara al-Ula (1959)
2. Jihad al-kital fi‘l-Islam (1948; translated into English by R. Peters in 1977 in Jihad in Mediaeval and Modern Islam)
3. al-Islam, Aqida wa-Shari’a (1959; translated into French by Messaoud Boudjenon in 1999 as L'islam: dogme et legislation)
4. al-Fatiwa, Dirasa li Mushkilat al-Muslim al-mu asir fi Hayatihi al-Yawmiyya al-Amma (1964)

== Notes ==
Sunni Islam titles
Preceded by Abd al-Rahman Taj	Grand Imam of Al-Azhar; 1958 - 1963	Succeeded by Hassan Mamoun
