= Salim al-Bishri =

Egyptian Sunni religious scholar

- Arabic: سَلِيم ٱلْبِشْرِي
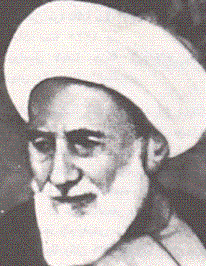
- Title: Grand Imam of Al-Azhar

Personal life
- Born: 1832
- Died: 1916 (aged 83–84)

Religious life
- Religion: Sunni Islam
- School: Maliki

Salim al-Bishri, (Arabic: سَلِيم ٱلْبِشْرِي) also known as Salim al-Bishri al-Maliki (1832 in Mahallat Bishr, Beheira – 1916 in Cairo), was an Egyptian Sunni religious scholar and a Grand Imam of al-Azhar. He was one of the six Grand Imams who held this position twice, once between 1899 and 1903 and again from 1909 until his death.

As a significant Maliki scholar among his generation of students at al-Azhar University, he later became the head of the Maliki scholars at the university before being appointed as the Grand Imam. He had a particular interest in hadiths, which are collections of sayings and actions of Muhammad. While serving as a conservative Grand Imam of al-Azhar, he initiated modernizations and reforms within the institution, including the significant reform of 1911. However, he came into conflict with Salafist and liberal Muslims.

He resigned from his position the first time due to a disagreement with the Egyptian government regarding the organization of al-Azhar. During his second term, he issued a fatwa condemning the massacre of Christians and Armenians during the Adana massacre.

He died in Cairo in 1916.

== Name ==
His full name was Salim bin Abi Farraj bin Salim bin Abi Farraj al-Bishri.

== Biography ==
=== Origins and youth ===
Salim al-Bishri was born in 1832 in Mahallat Bishr (Beheira). He came from an affluent family. After the death of his father when he was only seven years old, he began memorizing the Quran and became a hafiz. When he reached the age of nine, his family moved to Cairo, where he frequented the Sayyidah Zainab Mosque at night and attended classes at al-Azhar University during the day. He studied under various teachers, including the sheikhs al-Alish, al-Khanani, and Ibrahim al-Bajuri. His uncle was appointed as the leader of a pilgrimage caravan on behalf of Egypt under Mohamed Said Pasha, and he embarked on the Hajj pilgrimage during that time.

=== Imam and teacher ===
After receiving what was equivalent to a degree from al-Azhar University at the time, Salim al-Bishri was immediately appointed as an imam. Initially, he served as an imam in the Inal Mosque, then as an imam and preacher in the Zayn al-'Abidin Mosque in Cairo. He later continued his service at the Sayyidah Zainab Mosque and was subsequently appointed as a Maliki teacher at al-Azhar University. There, he taught notable students such as Sheikh Muhammad Arafa, Sheikh Muhammad Rashid, and Sheikh al-Basiouni al-Bayaani. He gained recognition as a Muslim scholar specializing in hadiths, which was his preferred field of study.

During his time in charge of the Sayyidah Zainab Mosque, he refused a renovation project that would have relocated the tomb of Sayyidah Zainab. After a confrontation with the architect, he succeeded in preserving the building in its previous state. During this period, he also earned respect as a revered mufti.

=== Grand Imam of Al-Azhar ===
He was later appointed as the head of the Maliki school at al-Azhar University as the sheikh and also secured a position within the Council of al-Azhar by Hassûnah an-Nawâwî (1895–1899), the Grand Imam at the time. After Hassûnah an-Nawâwî's passing, and following a brief interregnum, Salim al-Bishri succeeded him and became the Grand Imam of al-Azhar. He became the first Maliki leader of the institution in 175 years.

Salim al-Bishri held opposing views to the theological positions advocated by Muhammad Abduh, the founder of the Egyptian reformist movement, and Jamal al-Din al-Afghani, one of the pioneers of Pan-Islamism. However, he faced criticism from Salafists who accused him of not teaching hadiths correctly. Within this context, he opposed Muhammad Abduh's proposed reforms for the university. Nevertheless, he did accept some of Abduh's legal propositions that he deemed legitimate, such as simplifying divorce procedures for women.

He resigned from his position for the first time due to a conflict with the Khedive of Egypt, Abbas II of Egypt, whom he refused to grant the authority to appoint a sheikh within the university. He later returned to his role under Boutros Ghali after negotiating a salary increase for the teachers. He adopted a moderate stance between Egyptian authority and the independence of al-Azhar, agreeing to implement reforms if they contributed to the improvement of the institution. In 1909, he issued a fatwa concerning the massacres of Christians and condemned those responsible for the Adana massacre, in which he stated:

O Muslims, be faithful to your religion and beware of perpetrating acts forbidden by God in His Book and the Sunnah of His Prophet, and beware of disobeying God, which incites His anger and indignation. Verily, God has imposed on you responsibilities and ordained that you are obligated to grant certain rights to those to whom you are contractually bound and those who have entrusted their safety to you and those who live amongst you from among the Jews and the Christians (Ahl al-Dhimma). These include that you act righteously towards them as they have acted righteously towards you, protect them from what you protect yourselves and your kin from, to strengthen them with your strength and power, and to protect their homes, monasteries, and churches in the same manner that you protect your mosques and places of worship. And, by God, whoever transgresses against their women, murders them and oppresses them has truly violated the covenant established by God Almighty and violated their divinely-ordained obligations.

In 1911, Salim al-Bishri implemented a significant reform within al-Azhar, which, among other changes, established the Supreme Council of al-Azhar. He also engaged in discussions with Shiite figures, such as Abd al-Husayn Sharaf al-Din al-Musawi, with whom he maintained a correspondence.

=== Death ===
He died in Cairo in 1916.
