= Abd al-Halim Mahmud =

Egyptian Islamic scholar (1910–1978)

Abdel-Halim Mahmoud
- عبدالحليم محمود
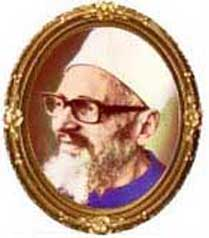

40th Grand Imam of Al-Azhar
- In office March 1973 – December 1978
- Preceded by: Muhammad al-Fahham
- Succeeded by: Abd al-Rahman Bisar

Personal life
- Born: 12 May 1910 Abou Ahmed, Sharqia, Khedivate of Egypt
- Died: 17 October 1978 (aged 68) Cairo, Egypt

Religious life
- Religion: Islam
- Denomination: Sunni
- Jurisprudence: Maliki

Abdel-Halim Mahmoud (Arabic: عبدالحليم محمود, romanized: ʿAbd al-Ḥalīm Maḥmūd; 12 May 1910 – 17 October 1978) was an Egyptian Islamic scholar who served as the 40th Grand Imam of al-Azhar from 1973 until his death in 1978.

Called “avuncular and beloved” by some, he was known for his modernizing approach to teaching at Al-Azhar University, preaching moderation and embracing modern science as a religious duty.

== Early life ==
Abdel-Halim Mahmoud was born on 12 May 1910 in the village of Abou Ahmed (now Al Salam), in the Sharqia Governorate, 50 kilometers north east of Cairo, Egypt. He memorized the Qur'an at an early age and then started his studies at Al-Azhar University where he graduated in 1932. He then continued his studies in France, where he obtained a Doctorate degree in philosophy from the Universite de Paris - La Sorbonne in 1940.

== Views and activities ==
According to scholars Moshe Albo and Yoram Meital, themes that reoccurred in Mahmoud's writing were:

the importance of knowledge and education; the superiority of Islamic morals and ethics; the uniqueness of Muslim history; the integration of Islamic spirituality and jurisprudence; the ultimate negation of the Other (e.g., the Western, Zionist, communist, secular, and heretic); the ascendance of Islamic theology and law; and the need to reform Egyptian politics and society in accordance with the pillars of Islam.

He signed an agreement with King Faisal, ruler of Saudi Arabia, to combat Communism in 1971 during the presidency of Anwar Sadat. The agreement had a budget of 40 million pounds.

=== Islamic law ===
Mahmoud was a consistent supporter of the replacement of Egypt's civil law code with Sharia. He argued that the Hudud (those sharia punishments which are mandated and fixed) punishment of amputation of a thief's hand was ordained by God and when implemented by Ibn Saud had brought law and order to Saudi Arabia—even though it had to be carried out only seven times.

On the other hand, Mahmoud issued a shariah fatwa supporting a minimum marrying age of sixteen for girls, despite the fact he acknowledged Shariah tradition did not specify any exact age. He argued "developed societies have set the age of marriage at sixteen, and this is appropriate".

=== Science ===
For Mahmoud, "any reform -- whether on the personal level or on the level of society -- begins with science, be that science religious or material..... Whether we begin the path of reform from the vantage point of theoretical science or from that of material or empirical science, our endeavours must be imbued with a purpose. This purpose is an Islamic obligation, as science must be the basis for the path towards God. Indeed, knowledge is a form of worship and a form of jihad."

During his tenure as Grand Imam, Al-Azhar witnessed unprecedented reform and revival, including the introduction of new faculties, teaching methods and management style.

=== Sufism ===
Abdel-Halim Mahmoud is also remembered for reviving Sufism through his prolific writings and lectures on the matter. He was greatly influenced by the Sudanese Sufi Sheikh Mohammed Osman Abdu al-Burhany whose knowledge shaped his views on Sufism.

"Abd al-Halim Mahmud (1910-1978) is remembered as the former rector of al-Azhar who wrote a great deal on Sufism. He is referred to by his honorific title, 'al-Ghazali, in 14th Century A.H.'2, a title he was given because of his unique ability to integrate the exoteric and esoteric dimensions of Islam (which are often considered contradictory at first glance). He became influential in 1960-1970s, the Sadat period in which Islamic revivalism began its rise to prominence in Egypt."

"Abd al-Halim presents tasawwuf as a scientific method that would enable people to comprehend the ultimate reality. The essence of tasawwuf is defined as knowledge (ma`rifa) of the metaphysical domain. Metaphysics is the science of explaining the hidden aspects of God and clarifying his prophecies. He emphasised its distinction of 'mysticism'-he proposed that tasawwuf is not a mere superstitious method, but a field of science (Mahmud Al-Munqidh: 224-233). `Abd al-Halim cites `Abbas Mahmud al-`Aqqad (died 1964) in saying that ma`rifa is an intellectual realm which neither physical science, cognition (fikr), nor various types of mental perception (basira etc.) have access to. Tasawwuf is the only science that can enter this realm, because although other sciences are bound to human capacity, tasawwuf is not (cited from ibid. 352-353)."

"Abd al-Halim's Sufism consists of three elements-`ilm, jihad, and `ubudiya. First was `ilm, the knowledge of Islamic Law. He emphasizes the significance of living according to shari`a, and stipulates that Islamic Law is to be understood and practiced accordingly. Moreover, he cites Abu Hamid al-Ghazali's work, which declares that God will bless those who acted according to their knowledge of Law-no matter how ignorant they might be-but would punish those who ignored the law irrespective of their knowledge4. Second is jihad, the effort to situate oneself within social reality and to solve the problems one faces. `Abd al-Halim's ideal image of Sufi is not exemplified through the concept of 'mystic' (those who live in seclusion, practicing asceticism). He states rather that Sufi must be committed to solving the problems of the time, and gives the example of `Abd al-Qadir al-Jazai'rli (d.1883), who fought for the defence of Algeria against France (ibid. 15-16). Third is `ubudiya, servitude to God: being correct and devoted. When `ubudiya is attained, ma`rifa is granted, and God showers the believer with Mercy (ibid. 12)".

== Sources ==
- Manhaj al-islah al-islami fi-al-mujtam' (The Method of Islamic Reform in Society), Abdel-Halim Mahmoud, Cairo: General Egyptian Book Organisation (GEBO), 2005.
- "The Grand Imams of Al-Azhar (Shuyukhul Azhar)" at www.sunnah.org.
