= Mustafa al-Maraghi =

Egyptian politician

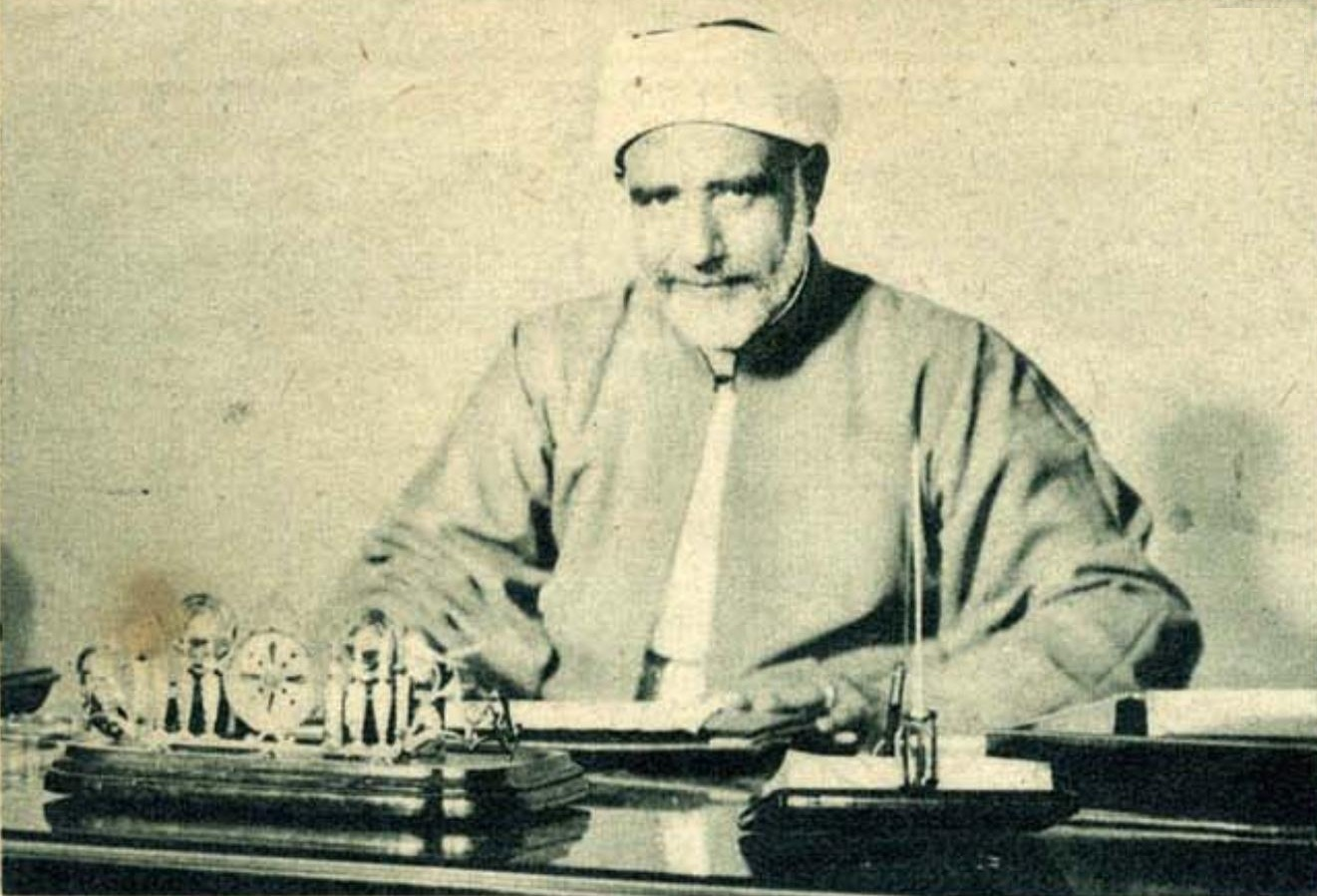
Mustafa al-Maraghi sitting at his desk

Muhammad Mustafa al-Maraghi OBE (Arabic: محمد مصطفى المراغي; 5 March 1881 – 22 August 1945) was an Egyptian reformer and rector of Al-Azhar from El Maragha, Sohag Governorate.

Al-Maraghi was active in encouraging reforms within legal and social contexts as well as within education where he notably campaigned for the introduction of modern sciences to the curriculum. He was a proponent of ijtihad—a process of making a legal decision by independent interpretation of the legal sources, the Qur'an and the Sunnah—and the integration of the separate schools of law. He was active on an international level with regard to religious conferences and was also open about his wish to see clergy take a more prominent role in government.

In the 1918 Birthday Honours, he was made an Honorary Officer of the Order of the British Empire as Grand Qadi of the Sudan.

In March 1924 al-Jizawi formed the Greater Committee for Religious Knowledge in direct response to the collapse of the Caliphate and the issue of preaching in such an environment. Al-Maraghi was included as a member.

Al-Maraghi met the English translator Marmaduke Pickthall, who wished his translation of the Qur'an authorized by the Al-Azhar University.
