= Cappello romano =

Hat worn by Catholic clergy

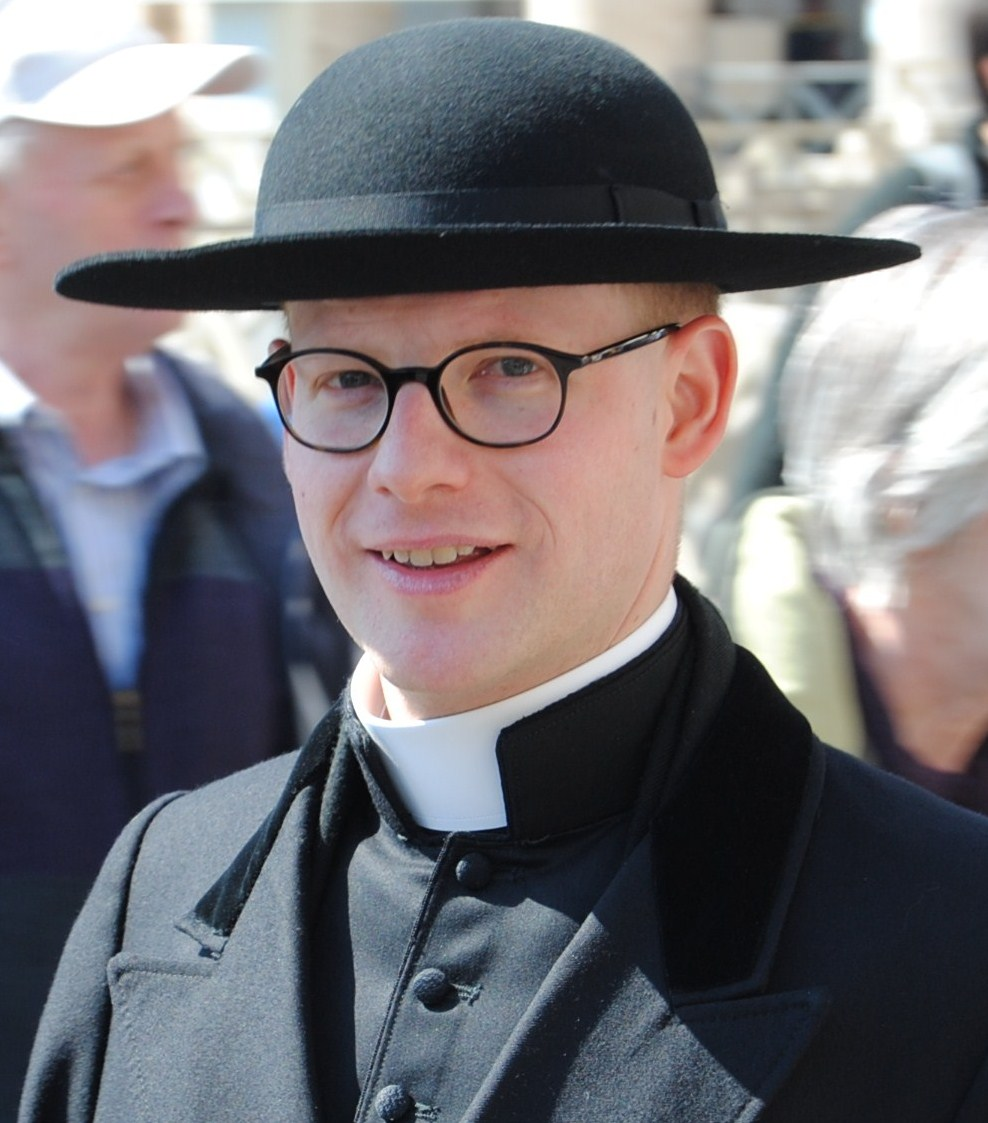
Catholic priest wearing a black cappello romano

A cappello romano (pl. cappelli romani; Italian, 'Roman hat') or saturno (pl. saturni; because its appearance is reminiscent of the ringed planet Saturn) is a clerical hat with a wide, circular brim and a rounded crown worn outdoors in some countries by Catholic clergy, when dressed in a cassock.

Unlike many other articles of clerical clothing, the cappello romano serves no ceremonial purpose, being primarily a practical item. (The galero is a ceremonial wide brim hat no longer usually worn. However, on February 19, 2011, Raymond Cardinal Burke became the first cardinal in recent times to wear [for a single photo] the galero.) The cappello romano is not used in liturgical services. It is uncommon even in Rome today. However, it was quite popular there and in some other countries with a Catholic majority population from the 17th century until around 1970.

== Description ==
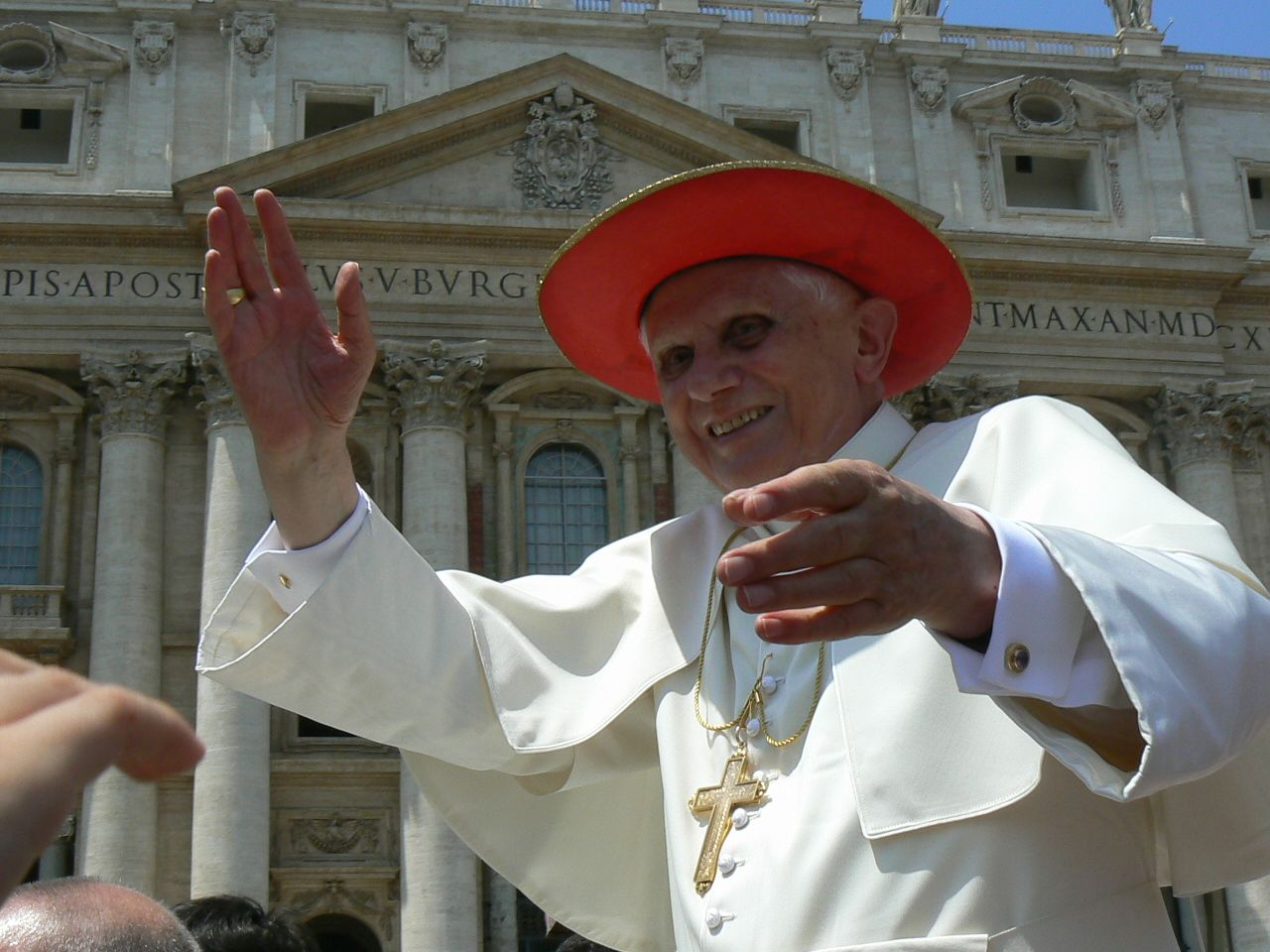
Pope Benedict XVI wearing the red papal cappello romano during an open-air Mass in 2007.

The cappello romano is a round, broad-brimmed, low-crowned hat made of either beaver fur, felt or straw and lined in white silk.

There are some, mostly minor, differences in the designs of cappelli, depending on the rank of the wearer:

- The pope may wear a red cappello with gold cords, or occasionally, white cappello.
- Cardinals may wear a black cappello with red and gold cords and scarlet lining. They formerly also had the privilege of wearing a red cappello. However, this rule was overturned by Pope Paul VI, and now cardinals' cappelli are black, as are those of all other clerics.
- Bishops may have a black cappello with green and gold cords and violet lining.
- A priest may wear a black cappello with black lining.
- Cappelli romani for deacons and seminarians have no distinguishing features.
Papal vestment

Cardinal's vestment

Episcopal vestment

Priest's vestment

== See also ==
- List of hat styles
- Philippi Collection
