= Hassan Mamoun =

- حسن مأمون
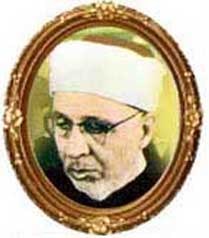

Grand Imam of Al-Azhar
- In office July 1964 – 1969
- Preceded by: Mahmud Shaltut
- Succeeded by: Muhammad al-Fahham

Grand Mufti of Egypt
- In office 28 February 1955 – 19 June 1960
- Preceded by: Ahmed Ibrahim Mughith
- Succeeded by: Ahmed Muhammad Abdel Haridi

Personal details
- Born: June 13, 1894 Cairo, Khedivate of Egypt
- Died: May 19, 1973 (aged 78) Cairo, Egypt

Hassan Mamoun (Arabic: حسن مأمون) (13 June 1894 – 19 May 1973) was the Grand Imam of al-Azhar or Shaykh al-Azhar between 1964 and 1969 and before that the Grand Mufti of Egypt between 1955 and 1960.

== Early life and career ==
Mamoun was born in Cairo, Egypt in 1894 to a father who was a leading member of the 'ulema ("religious scholars") and the imam of the Fath Mosque in the Abdin Palace. Growing up, Mamoun was influenced by both Arabic and French culture and studied at al-Azhar University. He graduated from the Qadi School (qadi as a religious judge) in 1918.

He subsequently began his career as a judge in Egypt's sharia courts, where he performed well. He was transferred to the Sudan where he served as Head Judge in 1941. as a result of his vociferous condemnations of British imperialism in the Sudan, however, he was transferred back to Cairo to serve as President of the Lower Courts until 1952 when he became President of the Higher Sharia Court. That same year, a group of army officers deposed the monarchy of King Farouk and began a process of ending British colonial influence in Egypt.

== Grand Mufti and Grand Imam ==
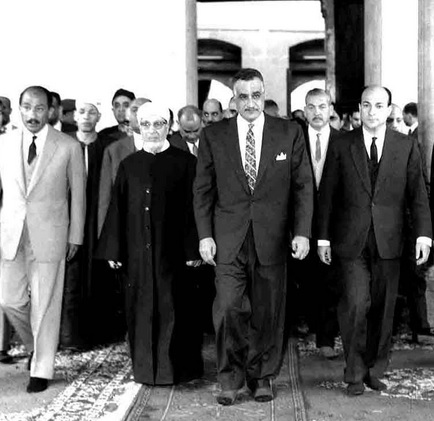
Mamoun (second from left in the forefront) with Egyptian government officials in the al-Azhar Mosque before Friday prayers in the last week of Ramadan, January 1966. President Gamal Abdel Nasser is standing to Mamoun's left and future president Anwar Sadat to his right

Mamoun was appointed Grand Mufti of Egypt on 28 February 1955 by the Egyptian government, succeeding Ahmed Ibrahim Mughith. His appointment coincided with the state's abolition of the sharia courts and the nationalization of the country's awqaf ("religious trusts"), thus making Mamoun one of the main scholars consulted for religious matters. On 19 June 1960 he left the post and was succeeded by Ahmed Muhammad Abdel Haridi. As Grand Mufti Mamoun had issued 11,992 fatawa ("religious edicts"), an average of 2,398 annually, the most ever issued by any Egyptian grand mufti.

In 1961, during the period of union with Syria (February 1958-September 1961), he was appointed by the Ministry of Awqaf to preside over a council of scholars to compose and edit the Encyclopedia of Islamic Fiqh, the largest compilation and organization fiqh in the 20th century. The process of completing took decades, long after Mamoun's death, but Mamoun personally contributed a significant amount of material to the encyclopedia.

In July 1964 President Gamal Abdel Nasser appointed Mamoun Grand Imam of al-Azhar. As Grand Imam, in August, Mamoun declared in a fatwa that contraception was not in contradiction to Islamic law, provided the mechanism was legitimate and the conditions necessitated it. He made the edict within the context of concerns regarding overpopulation, which he deemed a threat to humanity. He refused to issue a fatwa describing socialism as a doctrine of Islam, stating religion was neutral of individual ideologies, although it could be permissive or not permissive of certain ideological principles or methods.

Mamoun's health took a downturn and he resigned from al-Azhar in 1969. He died in 1973.

== Bibliography ==
- Skovgaard-Petersen, Jakob (1997), Defining Islam for the Egyptian State: Muftis and Fatwas of the Dār Al-Iftā, BRILL, ISBN 9789004109476
- Atighetchi, Dariusch (2006), Islamic Bioethics: Problems and Perspectives: Problems and Perspectives, Springer, ISBN 9781402049620

Sunni Islam titles
Preceded by Hasanayn Muhammad Makhluf	Grand Mufti of Egypt; 1955 - 1960	Succeeded by Ahmad Muhammad `Abd al-`Al Haridi
Preceded by Mahmud Shaltut	Grand Imam of Al-Azhar; 1964 - 1969	Succeeded by Muhammad al-Fahham
