= Abolition of the Caliphate =

Abolition of the last remnant of the former monarchy in Turkey

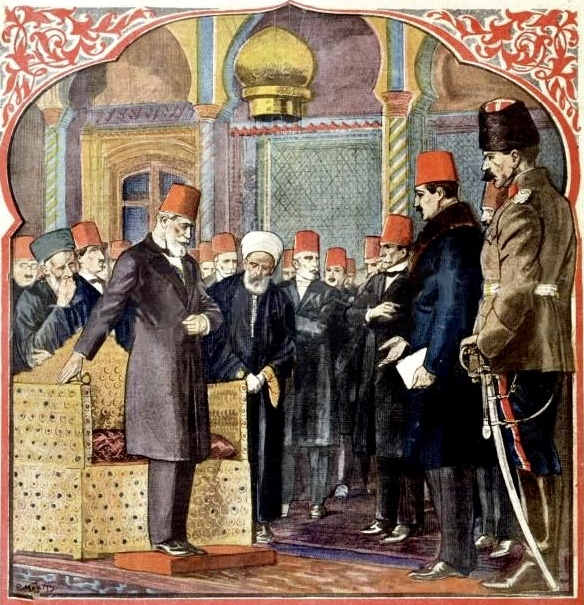
- "The Last Caliph", an illustration in Le Petit Journal illustré in March 1924, shortly after the abolition was carried out.
- Date: 3 March 1924; 102 years ago
- Venue: Grand National Assembly of Turkey
- Location: 39°54′42″N 32°51′04″E
- Cause: Atatürk's reforms
- Outcome: Deposition of Abdülmecid II

The Ottoman Caliphate, the Muslim world's last widely recognized caliphate, was abolished on 3 March 1924 (R.C. 1340, A.H. 1342) by decree of the Grand National Assembly of Turkey. The process was one of Atatürk's reforms. Abdul Mejid II was deposed as the last Ottoman caliph.

== Background ==
The Caliph (Arabic: خليفة, lit: successor) was nominally the supreme religious and political leader of all Sunni Muslims across the world, being the successor to the Prophet Muhammad's spiritual and temporal realm. The first four Rashidun Caliphs were elected, until the title became hereditary under the Umayyads and then the Abbasids. By the 900s various political authorities—called Sultans—governed temporal affairs in the Abbasids Caliph's name, leaving spiritual matters to the Caliph.

The first Ottoman Sultan to style himself "Caliph" was Murad I. Following Selim I's conquest of Egypt, the Ottoman Sultans ended the Abbasid Caliphate and took the title for themselves. Thus Ottoman monarchs held the dual titles of "Sultan" and "Caliph".

Sultan Abdul Hamid II maintained the title for soft power among the Islamic world, during the 19th century most of it was under European domination. However when the Ottoman Empire sided with Germany in World War I and Mehmed V proclaimed a Jihad against the Allied powers, the response was underwhelming, very few Muslims supported the Ottoman war effort.

During the Turkish War of Independence (1919–1923), the Islamic world became more concerned about the welfare of the Caliphate. The Caliph Mehmed VI's government in Istanbul was propped up by the Allied powers calling for his country to make peace with Greece, while Mustafa Kemal Pasha (Atatürk)'s government in Ankara resisted a peace settlement seen to be the product of Allied diktats. Kemal Pasha's legal fiction was that Mehmed VI had to be saved from the influence of foreigners and malevolent courtiers. Most Muslims, such as those surrounding the Indian-based Khilafat Movement, supported Kemal's movement.

With the conclusion of the war of independence and the Ottoman monarchy discredited, Kemal began to make moves against it, generating heated debate throughout the Muslim world.

== End of the sultanate ==
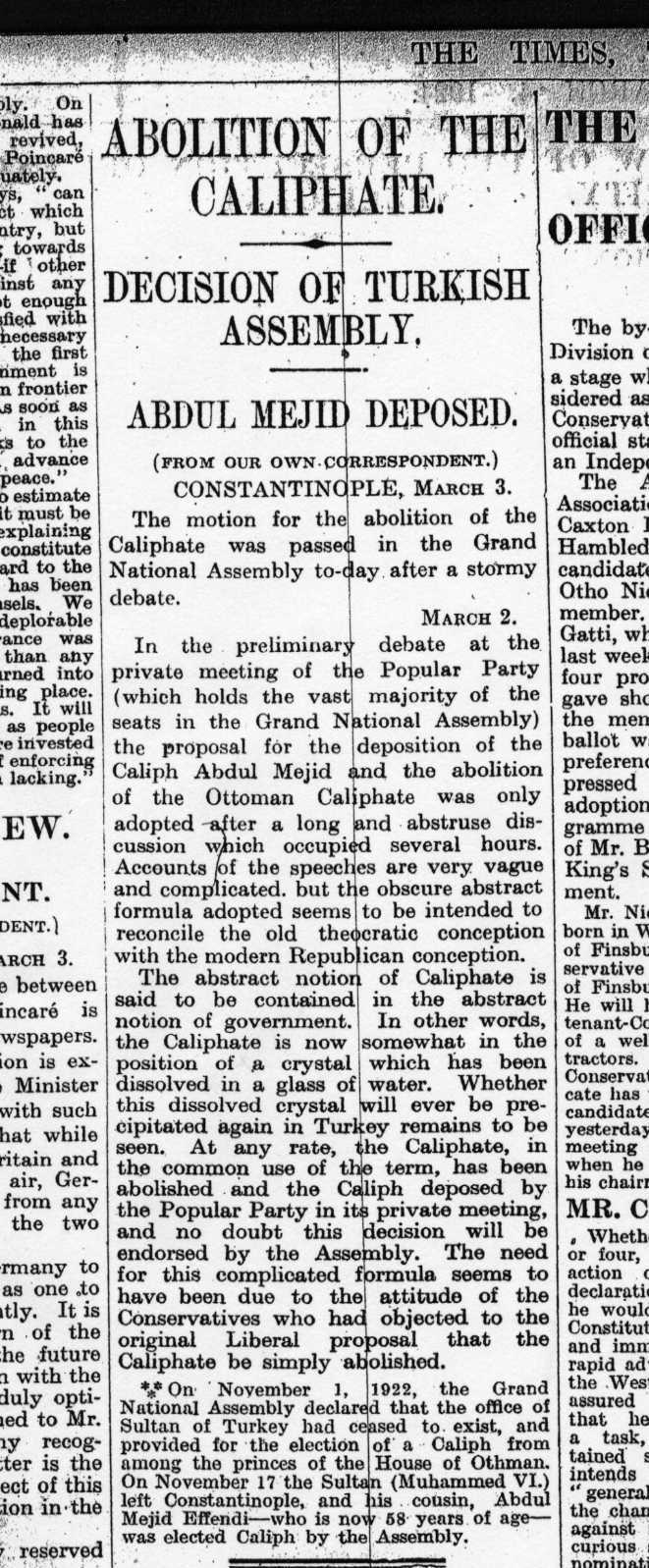
Abolition of the Caliphate in 1924 as reported in The Times, 3 March 1924.

In the end stages of the Turkish War of Independence, the Grand National Assembly in Ankara voted to separate the caliphate from the sultanate and abolished the latter on 1 November 1922. Mehmed VI escaped from Constantinople in a British battleship on 17 November 1922. A secret session of the GNA was held the day after, where it was deemed Mehmed's use of British aid while possessing the title of Caliph was treasonous to the Islamic world. The Turkish parliament announced it would elect a new Caliph, though the Caliphate position would be stripped of any authority. On 19 November Abdul Mejid II, the Ottoman Crown Prince, was elected Caliph, with 142 of 162 deputies voting. He soon established himself in Istanbul. The government in Ankara attempted to arrange a simple bay'ah ceremony, but Abdul Mejid went through with an ostentatious ceremony anyway.

== Tensions between Kemal and Abdul Mejid II ==
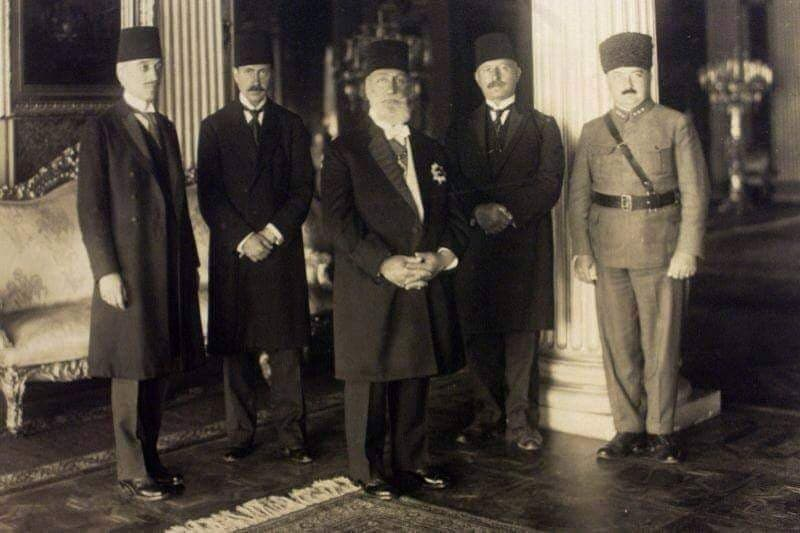
Abdülmecid being officially informed of his dethronement in March 1924

Abdul Mejid would overstep the boundaries set for him, getting involved in politics and engaging in political feuds.

Traditionalist supporters of the Caliphate within the Parliament sought to restore the institution with political authority. A widely discussed pamphlet supporting temporal powers to the Caliph reached Mustafa Kemal Pasha while he was in İzmit, where he subsequently denounced the Caliphate as an institution as opposed to the will of the people.

A new parliament arrived with the 1923 elections, with its first task to ratify the Treaty of Lausanne on 11 August 1923. During this time, complaints regarding the budget allocated to the caliphate were raised. The matter was concluded by deferring the issue to the 1924 budget, deciding it should be examined separately rather than as part of the general budget. On 29 October 1923, the parliament proclaimed Turkey a republic with Ankara its capital. Some wanted the Caliph to be the president of the republic, and transform the position into the country's head of state. With the election of Mustafa Kemal Pasha as President, the question of the head of state was settled.

Two Indian brothers, Mohammad Ali Jauhar and Maulana Shaukat Ali, leaders of the Indian-based Khilafat Movement, distributed pamphlets calling on the Turks to preserve the Ottoman Caliphate for the sake of Islam. On 24 November 1923, Syed Ameer Ali and Aga Khan III sent a letter to Prime Minister İsmet Pasha (İnönü) on behalf of the movement. The government deemed the note to be foreign interference and an attack on Turkish sovereignty and state security. In January 1924 Abdul Mejid requested an increase in his allowance and for official delegations visiting Istanbul to visit him. President Mustafa Kemal denounced his requests as attacks on the republic and warned the Abdul Mejid against restoring the monarchy. On 25 February 1924, the issue of the allowances for the Caliph and the Ottoman dynasty was debated in Parliament during budget negotiations.

== Voting to end the Caliphate and expel the Ottomans ==
On March 3, 1924, a twelve-article bill regarding the abolition of the Caliphate, prepared by Sheikh Saffet Efendi (Deputy for Urfa) and fifty-three of his colleagues was submitted to the Parliament. After the bill was read, the first article -declaring the deposition of the Caliph and the abolition of the Caliphate- was adopted verbatim. The bill was passed with the votes of 157 of the 158 members present; the sole dissenting vote was cast by Zeki Bey, MP for Gümüşhane. During the same session, the Law on the Abolition of the Ministry of Sharia and the Foundations and the General Staff, as well as the Law on the Unification of Education, were also adopted, and the decision was made to establish the Presidency of Religious Affairs.

Also as part of this same bill was an article which would expel members of the Ottoman family from the country. Although the members of the Ottoman dynasty were granted a ten-day period to leave the country, Abdul Mejid Efendi was put on a train at Çatalca Station that very night, accompanied by his family of eleven; the Governor of Istanbul and the Chief of Police escorted him to the border.

== Aftermath ==
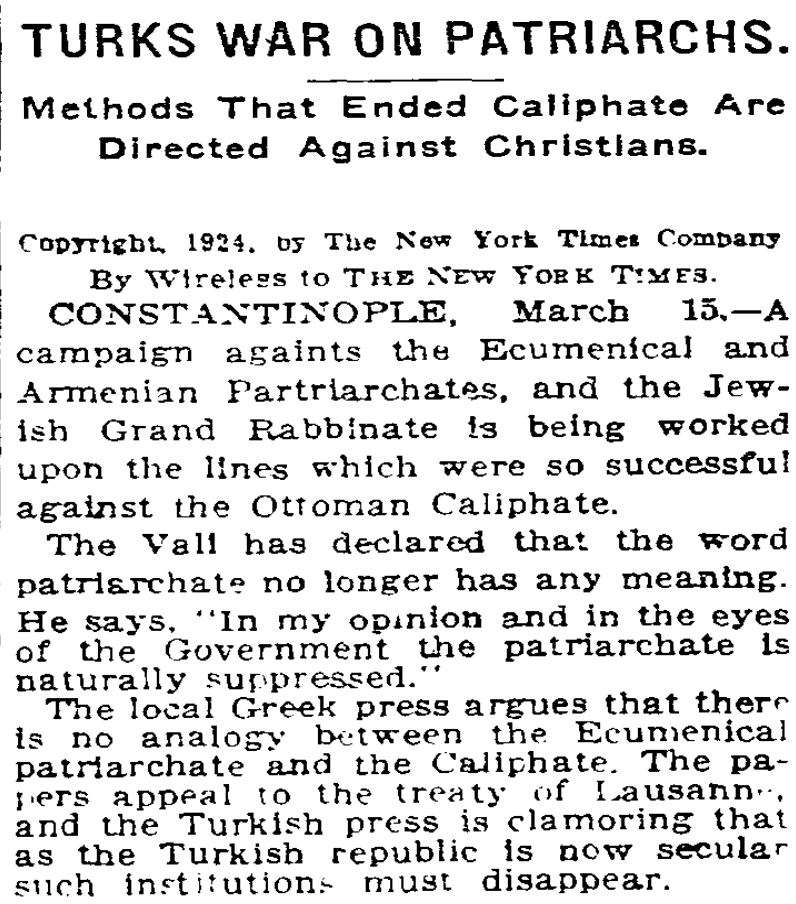
"Turks War on Patriarchs," after the abolition of the caliphate (The New York Times, 16 March 1924).

With the failure of the Muslim world to find consensus on establishing a new caliphate, the claim of the caliphate entered a period of dormancy.

Atatürk reportedly offered the caliphate to Ahmed Sharif as-Senussi, on the condition that he reside outside Turkey; Senussi declined the offer and confirmed his support for Abdul Mejid. At least 13 different candidates were proposed for the caliphate in subsequent years, but none were able to gain a consensus for the candidacy across the Islamic world. Candidates included Abdul Mejid II, his predecessor Mehmed VI, King Hussein of Hejaz, Sultan Yusef of Morocco, King Amanullah Khan of Afghanistan, Imam Yahya of Yemen, and King Fuad I of Egypt. Unsuccessful "caliphate conferences" were held in the Dutch East Indies (today Indonesia) in 1924, in 1926 in Cairo, and in 1931 in Jerusalem. The Sharifian Caliphate under Hussein existed for a few years.

On 28 March 1924, Muhammad al-Jizawi, Rector of Cairo's prestigious Al-Azhar University, in direct response to the collapse and the issue of preaching in such an environment, formulated a resolution:

Whereas the Caliphate in Islam implies general control of the spiritual and temporal affairs of Islam; Whereas the Turkish Government deprived the Caliph Abdul Mejid of his temporal powers, thereby disqualifying him from becoming Caliph in the sense that Islam required; seeing that in principle the Caliph is destined to be the representative of the Prophet, safeguarding everything concerning Islam, which necessarily means the Caliph should be subject of respect, veneration and obedience; and whereas the Caliph Abdul Mejid no longer possesses such qualifications and has not even the power to live in his native land; now therefore it has been decided to convene an Islamic conference in which all Muslim nations shall be represented in order to consider who should be appointed Caliph...

In Egypt, debate focused on a controversial book by Ali Abdel Raziq which argued for secular government and against a caliphate. The 1926 Cairo Caliphate Conference considered the question of whether or not to revive the caliphate, but ultimately agreed that the time was not right.

Today, two frameworks for pan-Islamic coordination exist: the Muslim World League and the Organisation of Islamic Cooperation, both of which were founded in the 1960s.

The most active group that exists to re-establish the caliphate is Hizb ut-Tahrir, founded in 1953 as a political organization in then Jordanian-controlled Jerusalem by Taqiuddin al-Nabhani, an Islamic scholar and appeals court judge from Haifa. This organization has spread to more than 50 countries, and grown to a membership estimated to be between "tens of thousands" to "about one million."

Militant Islamist organizations such as the Federated Islamic State of Anatolia (based in Germany, 1994–2001) and the Islamic State of Iraq and the Levant (1999–present, declaration of caliphate in 2014) declared that they had re-established the Caliphate, although these claims received little acknowledgment from other Muslims. War against the Islamic State brought an end to the Islamic State's short-lived caliphate.

== See also ==
- Abolition of the Ottoman sultanate

== Bibliography ==
- Ardıç, Nurullah (2012). Islam and the Politics of Secularism: The Caliphate and Middle Eastern Modernization in the Early 20th Century. Routledge. ISBN 978-0-415-67166-8.
- Armstrong, Harold Courtenay (1933). Gray Wolf, Mustafa Kemal: An Intimate Study of a Dictator. Minton, Balch & Co.
- Arnold, Thomas W. (18 November 2016). The Caliphate. Taylor & Francis. ISBN 978-1-315-44322-5.
- Black, Antony (19 July 2011). History of Islamic Political Thought. Edinburgh University Press. ISBN 978-0-7486-8878-4.
- Brown, Daniel W. (24 August 2011). A New Introduction to Islam. John Wiley & Sons. ISBN 978-1-4443-5772-1.
- Dahlan, Malik (1 August 2018). The Hijaz: The First Islamic State. Oxford University Press. pp. 133–. ISBN 978-0-19-093501-6.
- Enayat, Hamid; ʻInāyat, Ḥamīd (24 June 2005). "The Crisis Over the Caliphate". Modern Islamic Political Thought. I. B. Tauris. ISBN 978-1-85043-465-8.
- Guida, Michelangelo (2008). "Seyyid Bey and the Abolition of the Caliphate". Middle Eastern Studies. 44 (2): 275–289. doi:10.1080/00263200701874917. JSTOR 40262571. S2CID 144310690.
- Kedourie, Elie (1963). "Egypt and the Caliphate 1915-1946". The Journal of the Royal Asiatic Society of Great Britain and Ireland. 95 (3–4): 208–248. doi:10.1017/S0035869X00121938. JSTOR 25202646. S2CID 162821935.
- Kennedy, Hugh (11 October 2016). Caliphate: The History of an Idea. Basic Books. ISBN 978-0-465-09439-4.
- Melis, Nicola (2021). "La questione del califfato ottomano tra teoria e prassi". Rivista italiana di storia internazionale. 4 (1): 15–39. doi:10.30461/101430.
- Nafi, Basheer (11 December 2012). "The Abolition of the Caliphate in Historical Context". In Al-Rasheed; Kersten; Shterin (eds.). Demystifying the Caliphate: Historical Memory and Contemporary Contexts. Oxford University Press. ISBN 978-0-19-932795-9.
- Nafi, Basheer (2016). "The Abolition of the caliphate: causes and consequences". The Different aspects of Islamic culture, v. 6, pt. I: Islam in the World Today; Retrospective of the Evolution of Islam and the Muslim World. UNESCO. pp. 183–192.
- Oliver-Dee, Sean (13 August 2009). The Caliphate Question: The British Government and Islamic Governance. Lexington Books. ISBN 978-0-7391-3603-4.
- Özcan, Azmi (1997). Pan-Islamism: Indian Muslims, the Ottomans and Britain, 1877–1924. BRILL. ISBN 90-04-10632-4.
- Özoğlu, Hakan (2011). From Caliphate to Secular State: Power Struggle in the Early Turkish Republic. ABC-CLIO. ISBN 978-0-313-37956-7.
- Pankhurst, Reza (12 April 2013). The Inevitable Caliphate?: A History of the Struggle for Global Islamic Union, 1924 to the Present. Oxford University Press. ISBN 978-0-19-025732-3.
- Teitelbaum, Joshua (2000). "'Taking Back' the Caliphate: Sharīf Ḥusayn Ibn ʿAlī, Mustafa Kemal and the Ottoman Caliphate". Die Welt des Islams. 40 (3): 412–424. doi:10.1163/1570060001505343. JSTOR 1571258.
