= 1926 Cairo Caliphate Conference =

Meeting by Muslims to consider the caliphate question

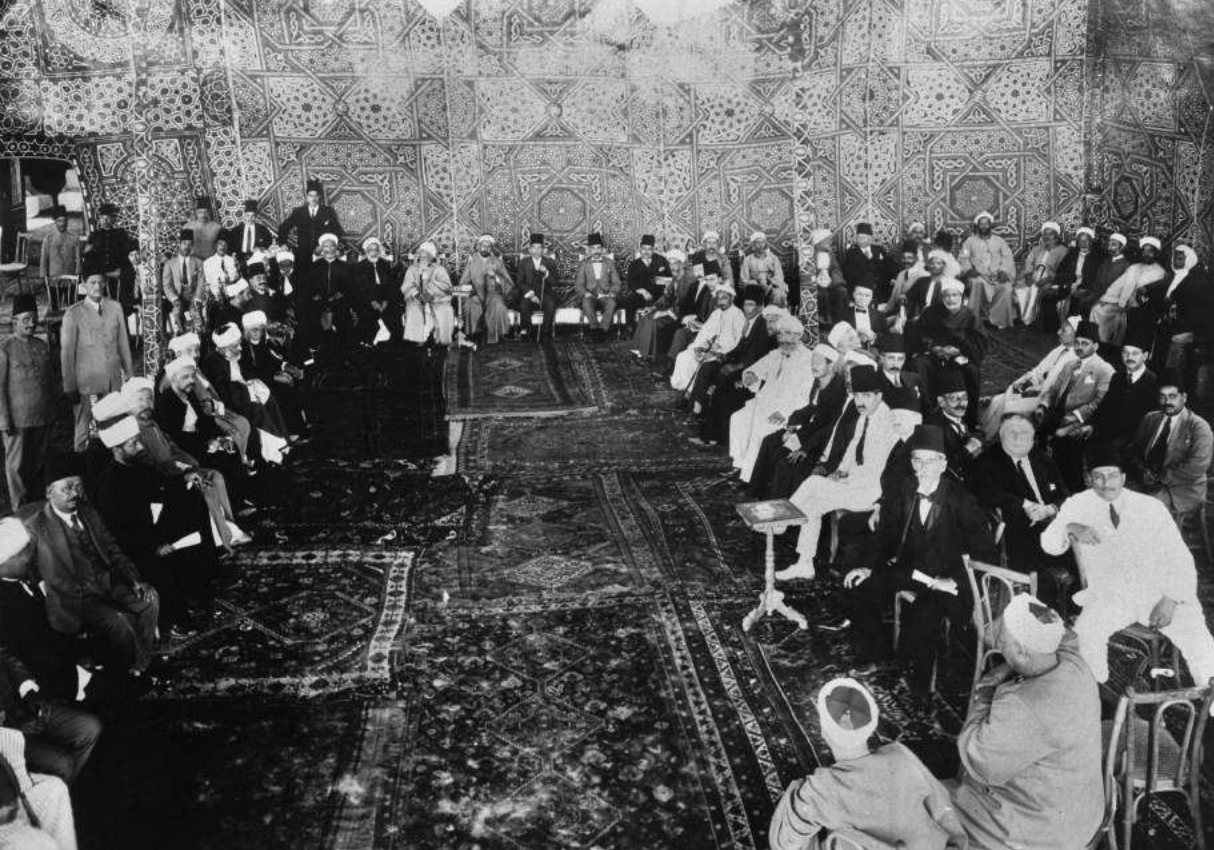
The caliphate congress in Cairo, 1926

Following the abolition of the caliphate on 3 March 1924, a conference was held in Egypt in May 1926 by Muslim scholars to consider the caliphate question. Though King Fuad I was considered to be a new caliph, the conference did not end up selecting him. Other candidates proposed were King Husayn, Moulay Yusef ben Hassan, Abd al-Karim, Aga Khan III. In the end, due to differences in opinions on the necessity and feasibility of the caliphate, especially due to Western imperialism in the region, the conference concluded that a caliphate was not possible at the moment.

== Events ==
The decision of the Turkish government to abolish the Ottoman caliphate was met with shock and horror in Egypt at the removal of an important Islamic institution. A wide range of Egyptian politicians criticized the decision. Mohammed Hussein Heikal of the Liberal Constitutional Party criticized the Turks "impulsiveness" and "immoderation" in comparison to Egypt's more gradual modernization which better maintained the balance between modernization and religion. Conservatives, such as those in Watani party, were the most critical of the new regime, despite some conservative poets having previously supported Mustafa Kemal. Many Egyptians still recognized Abdülmecid II as caliph, a position taken by the grand imam of Al-Azhar on 15 March 1924, though this idea diminished over time. However, some never recognized him as a legitimate caliph, since he was the only one elected by a governmental body, the Grand National Assembly of Turkey. Egyptians were also broadly against King Husayn's attempt to claim the caliph title, due to his ties to the British.

The idea of an Islamic conference on the caliphate had been suggested as early as 1923 by the Turks and was suggested by the Egyptian press a few days after the abolition. The Turkish president Mustafa Kemal offered to back Idris of Libya in exchange for him legitimizing the secularization of Turkey. The secular Wafd party was officially agnostic on the caliphate issue, however there were reports that Wafdist prime minister Saad Zaghloul attempted to persuade King Fuad to accept the title, potentially gain leverage over negotiations with the United Kingdom. In any case, following the dismissal of Zaghloul's government later that year, the Wafd later discouraged this initiative. The Egyptian ulema eventually withdrew their recognition of Abdülmecid II as caliph on 25 March, claiming instead that he was invalid as caliph since 1922, and officially called for a general meeting of Muslim representatives. While done on their own initiative, this was quickly backed by conservative monarchists and the al-Azhar establishment. Opposition came from those who still recognized the former caliph as well as the secular Egyptian parties. This opposition, as well as the Saudi-Sharif war and the general lack of reception from other Muslims, delayed the conference until 1926. One possible motivation for the revival of the caliphate question was Ali Abdel Raziq's book - Islam and the Foundations of Governance - which argued against the idea of the necessity of the caliphate, triggering conservative Azharite backlash.

The reemergence of the caliphate question by Al-Azhar in February 1926 was again met with widespread opposition both in an outside Egypt. In February 1926, forty ulema of al-Azhar signed a statement opposing establishing the caliphate to Egypt so long as it was under British influence and the Sharia was not the law. Another group called the Abu Al-'Aza'im Caliphate also disputed the idea, instead supporting hosting the conference in Saudi Arabia. The Wafd party suggested that the caliphate would be inappropriate in a country only partially free and could invite more foreign influence, while the Liberal Constitutionalists argued that only parliament could decide this matter. Other Muslims outside Egypt were also not particularly receptive. The stated purpose of the Azharites was to consider the nature and necessity of the Caliphate itself and on its potential reinstatement; King Fuad officially denied having aspirations of becoming caliph.

The meeting consisted of around 40 unofficial representatives from fourteen countries. Almost half of the representatives only represented themselves; the one delegate from India and the two from Indonesia did not represented their respective countries' largest ulama and there were no representatives for Turkey, Iran (Note: While Iran was invited, the Iranian government only allowed their diplomatic representative in Cairo to spectate.) and Afghanistan. In total, of the 610 invitations sent, only 29 foreign delegates arrived, in addition to Egypt's 15. The four sessions were held on 13, 15, 18 and 19 May 1926. The congress was divided into three committees, one over procedure, the second over the "nature and the necessity of the Caliphate" and the third with the practicality. The second committee, which was dominated by Egyptians, concluded with the traditional view that the caliphate was indispensable to the faith. The third committee concluded that restoring the caliphate was "incapable of realization at the present time, in view of the situation in which Muslims find themselves" and instead recommend a central committee in Cairo and branches in other Muslim countries which could revive the caliphate at some future date.

Country	Numbers of Delegates
Egypt	15
Palestine	8
Libya	4
Iraq	3
Hijaz	2
South Africa	2
Sumatra	2
Yemen	2
India	1
Morocco	1
Johor	1
Poland	1
Syria	1
Tunisia	1

== Sources ==
- Hassan, Mona (2016). "In International Pursuit of a Caliphate". Longing for the Lost Caliphate: A Transregional History. Princeton University Press.
- Hattemer, Richard (2000). "Ataturk and the Reforms in Turkey as Reflected in the Egyptian Press". Journal of Islamic Studies. 11 (1): 21–42. doi:10.1093/jis/11.1.21. ISSN 0955-2340.
- Kirillina, Svetlana A.; Safronova, Alexandra L.; Orlov, Vladimir V. (2022). "Caliphate in the Ideological Dialogue of the Islamic World: The Case of Pan-Islamic Congress in Cairo (1926)". RUDN Journal of World History (in Russian). 14 (1): 7–19. doi:10.22363/2312-8127-2022-14-1-7-19. ISSN 2312-833X.
- Kedourie, Elie (October 1963). "Egypt and the Caliphate 1915–1946". Journal of the Royal Asiatic Society. 95 (3–4): 208–248. doi:10.1017/S0035869X00121938. ISSN 1474-0591. JSTOR 25202646.
- Kramer, Martin (1986). "The Caliphate Grail: The General Islamic Congress for the Caliphate in Egypt, 1926". Islam Assembled: The Advent of the Muslim Congresses. Columbia University Press.
- Gershoni, Israel; Jankowski, James (1987). "Egypt and the Caliphate Question: 1924-1926". Egypt, Islam and the Arabs: The Search for Egyptian Nationhood, 1900-1930. Oxford University Press.
- Li̇vaoğlu Mengüç, Hilal, The Egyptian Response to the Abolition of the Caliphate: A Press Survey, CTAD, Year 15, Issue 30 (Fall 2019), pp. 109–133.
- Melis, Nicola (2025). "The Caliphate Congresses and the Ottoman Sultans". In Giunchi, Elisa; Melis, Nicola (eds.). The Abolition of the Ottoman Caliphate, 1924: Debates and Implications. Routledge.
- Pankhurst, Reza (2013). "Global Unity Through a Nation State: Banna, the Muslim Brotherhood and Authority Under Occupation". The Inevitable Caliphate?: A History of the Struggle for Global Islamic Union, 1924 to the Present. Oxford University Press.
- Mariam, Sarhan; M., Zaki; R., Maher (2024). "King Faruk's Project of Re-establishing the Caliphate in Egypt and Its Islamic Cultural Heritage (1936-1952)". Egyptian Journal of Archaeological and Restoration Studies. 14 (1): 163–172. doi:10.21608/ejars.2024.362393. ISSN 2090-4940.
- Wegner, Mark Jonathan (December 2001). Islamic Government: The Medieval Sunni Islamic Theory of the Caliphate and the Debate Over the Revival of the Caliphate in Egypt, 1924-1926 (Thesis). The University of Chicago. ProQuest 304737827.
- Whidden, James (2013). Monarchy and Modernity in Egypt: Politics, Islam and Neo-Colonialism between the Wars. I.B. Tauris.
