= Grand Imam of al-Azhar =

Religious leader in Egypt

- الإمام الأكبر
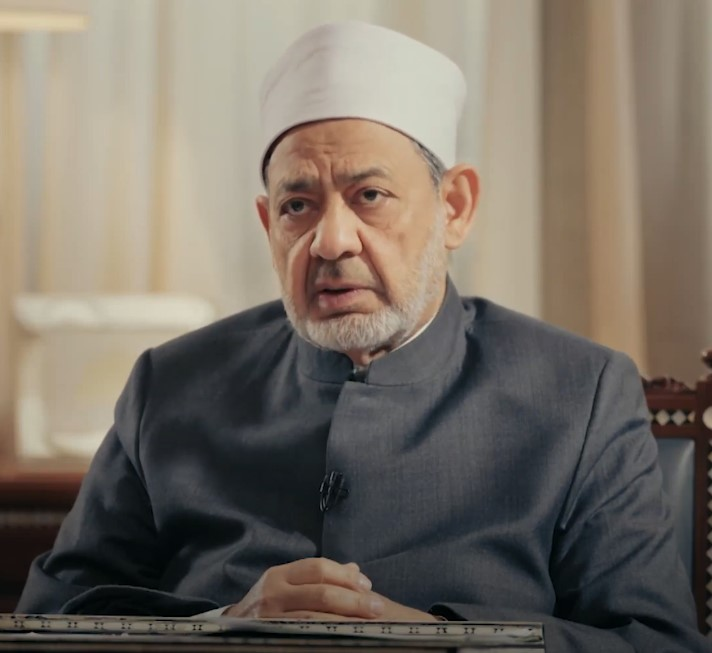
- Incumbent; Ahmed el-Tayeb since 10 March 2010
- Residence: Sheikhdom of Al-Azhar
- Appointer: President of Egypt
- Formation: 1679 (traditional); 1961 (official)
- First holder: Muhammad al-Kharashi (traditional); Mahmud Shaltut (official)

The Grand Imam of al-Azhar (Arabic: الإمام الأكبر), also known as Grand Sheikh of al-Azhar (Arabic: شيخ الأزهر الشريف), is an official title in Egypt and the Islamic world. The current Grand Imam is Ahmed el-Tayeb, who assumed the role on 10 March 2010.

The Grand Imam of al-Azhar is considered by some Muslims to be the highest authority in Sunni Islamic thought and Islamic jurisprudence, and holds great influence on followers of the theological Ash'ari and Maturidi traditions worldwide. The Grand Imam heads the Al-Azhar Al Sharif, al-Azhar Mosque, and by extension al-Azhar University, and is responsible for official religious matters along with the Grand Mufti of Egypt.

== History ==
The title of the Grand Imam of al-Azhar was officially established in 1961. In the 14th century the head of al-Azhar was granted the title of Mushrif of al-Azhar, then later Nazir of Al-Azhar and, during the Ottoman Empire, the Grand Sheikh of al-Azhar. Today the bearer of the title also carries the title of the Grand Sheikh.

== See also ==
- List of grand imams of al-Azhar

== Sources ==
- Dodge, Bayard (1961), Al-Azhar: A Millennium of Muslim learning, Middle East Institute
- Beattie, Kirk J. (2000), Egypt during the Sadat years, Palgrave Macmillan, ISBN 978-0-312-23246-7
- Bennett, Clinton (2005), Muslims and modernity: an introduction to the issues and debates, Continuum International Publishing Group, ISBN 978-0-8264-5481-2
