= Al-Azhar University =

Public university in Cairo, Egypt

- جامعة الأزهر
- Motto: "The Centre of Knowledge" Qiblatul 'ilm
- Type: Public
- Established: c. 970/972 – founded as institution for higher Islamic learning 1961 – gained university status
- Religious affiliation: Islam
- Endowment: Ministry of Awqaf
- President: Salama Gomaa Daoud
- Location: Cairo, Egypt; 30°02′45″N 31°15′45″E
- Campus: Urban
- Website: azhar.edu.eg

University rankings

Global – Overall
- QS World: 1001-1200 (2026)
- THE World: 801–1000 (2024)
- USNWR Global: =739 (2023)

Al-Azhar University (Note: /ˈɑːzhɑːr/ AHZ-har; Egyptian Arabic: جامعة الأزهر, romanized: Gami'et el-Azhar, IPA: [ˈɡæmʕet elˈʔɑzhɑɾ eʃʃæˈɾiːf]) is a public university in Cairo, Egypt. Founded in 970, and associated with the Al-Azhar Al-Sharif religious institution in Islamic Cairo, it is Egypt's oldest degree-granting university, and one of the oldest universities in the world. It is known as one of the most prestigious universities for Islamic learning. In addition to higher education, Al-Azhar oversees a national network of schools with approximately two million students. As of 1996, over 4,000 teaching institutes in Egypt were affiliated with the university.

Founded in 970 or 972 by the Fatimid Caliphate as a centre of Islamic learning, its students studied the Qur'an and Islamic law, along with logic, grammar, rhetoric, and how to calculate the phases of the moon. Today it is the chief centre of Arabic literature and Islamic learning in the world. In 1961 additional non-religious subjects were added to its curriculum.

Its library is considered second in importance in Egypt only to the Egyptian National Library and Archives. In May 2005, Al-Azhar in partnership with a Dubai information technology enterprise, IT Education Project (ITEP) launched the H.H. Mohammed bin Rashid Al Maktoum project to preserve Al-Azhar scripts and publish them online (the "Al-Azhar Online Project") to eventually publish online access to the library's entire rare manuscripts collection, comprising about seven million pages of material.

== History ==
=== Beginnings under the Fatimids ===
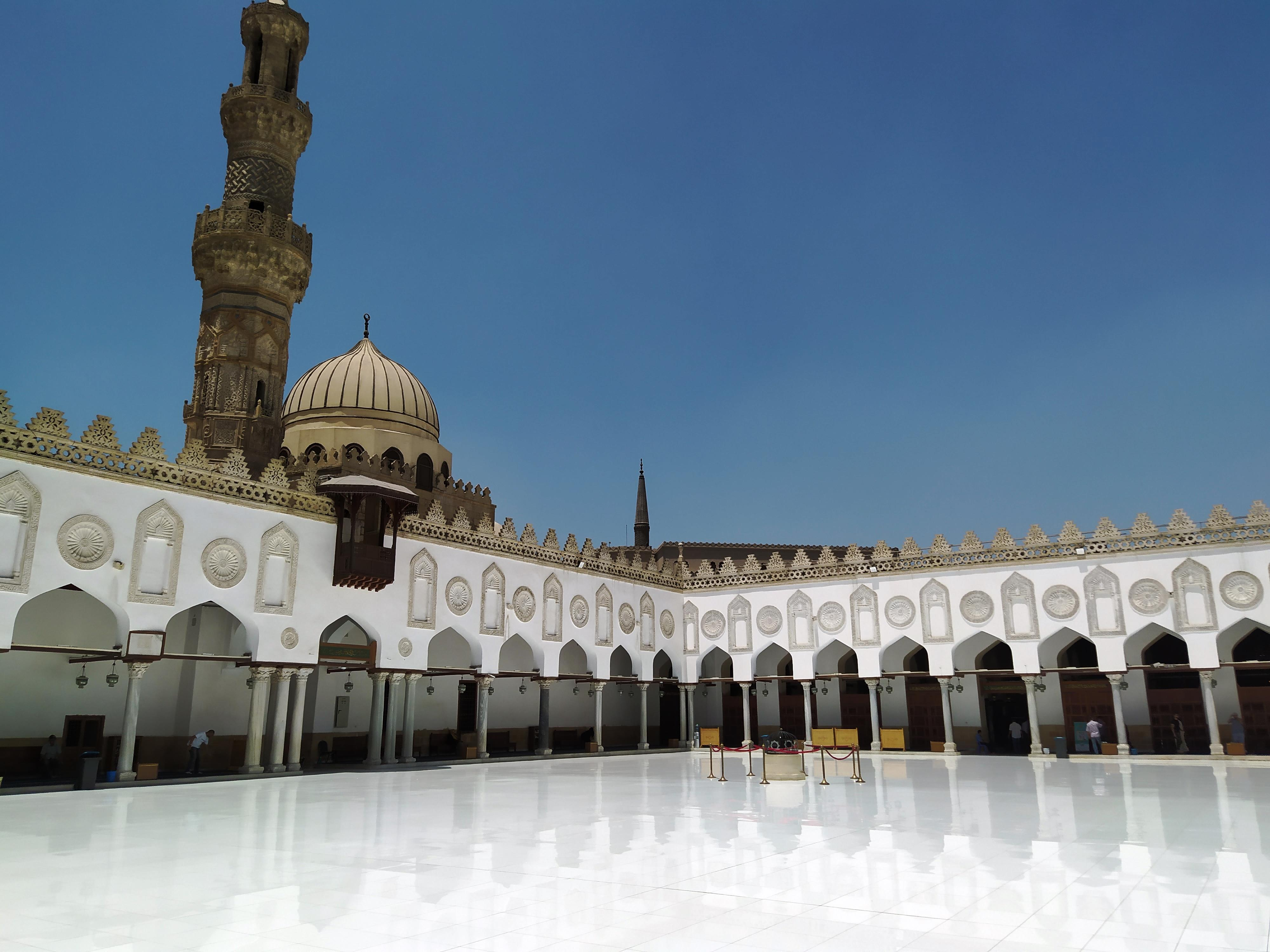
The courtyard of the Al-Azhar Mosque, which largely dates to the Fatimid period

Al-Azhar is one of the relics of the Ismaili Shi'a Fatimid dynasty, which claimed descent from Fatimah, daughter of Muhammad and wife of Ali, son-in-law, and cousin of Muhammad. Fatimah was called al-Zahra (the luminous), and the institution was named in her honour. It was founded as a mosque by the Fatimid commander Jawhar al-Siqilli at the orders of the Caliph and Imam Al-Mu'izz li-Din Allah as he founded the city for Cairo. It was begun (probably on Saturday) in Jumada al-Awwal in the year AH 359 (March/April 970 CE). Its building was completed on the 9th of Ramadan in AH 361 (24 June 972 CE). Both Caliph al-Aziz Billah and Caliph Al-Hakim bi-Amr Allah added to its premises. It was further repaired, renovated, and extended by al-Mustansir Billah and al-Hafiz li-Din Allah.

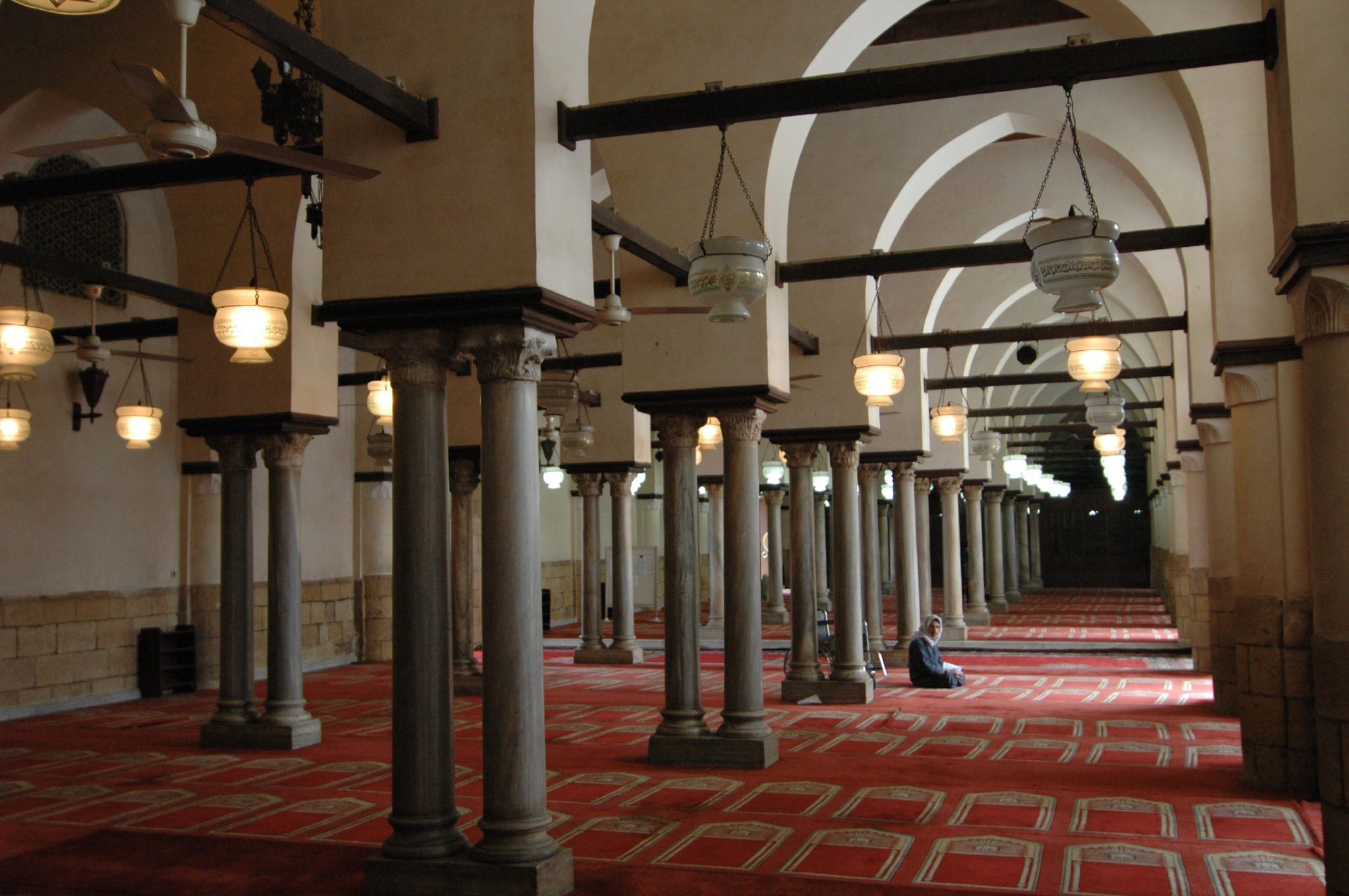
Prayer hall of Al-Azhar Mosque

In 988 CE, it was Ya'qub ibn Killis, the first Vizier of the Fatimid Empire, who officially designated Al-Azhar as a center for higher learning. He personally established a regular program of study and hired a permanent staff of 35 scholars to teach Islamic jurisprudence, law, and other sciences.

The Fatimid caliphs always encouraged scholars and jurists to have their study-circles and gatherings in this mosque and thus it was turned into a madrasa which has the claim to be considered as the oldest such institution still functioning. The mosque provided teaching on a variety of subjects from a variety of scholars. According to Syed Farid Alatas, these subjects included Islamic law and jurisprudence, Arabic grammar, Islamic astronomy, Islamic philosophy, and logic. Under the Fatimids, Al-Azhar also notably promoted Shia Islam.

=== Saladin ===
In the 12th century, following the overthrow of the Isma'ili Fatimid dynasty, Saladin (the founder of the Sunni Ayyubid dynasty) converted Al-Azhar to a Shafi'ite Sunni centre of learning. Therefore, "he had all the treasures of the palace, including the books, sold over a period of ten years. Many were burned, thrown into the Nile, or thrown into a great heap, which was covered with sand, so that a regular "hill of books" was formed and the soldiers used to sole their shoes with the fine bindings. The number of books said to have been disposed of varies from 120,000 to 2,000,000." Abd-el-latif delivered lectures on Islamic medicine at Al-Azhar, while according to legend the Jewish philosopher Maimonides delivered lectures on medicine and astronomy there during the time of Saladin though no historical proof has corroborated this.

Saladin introduced the college system in Egypt, which was also adopted in Al-Azhar. Under this system, the college was a separate institution within the mosque compound, with its own classrooms, dormitories and a library.

=== Mamluks ===
Under the Mamluks, Al-Azhar gained influence and rose in prestige. The Mamluks established salaries for instructors and stipends for the students and gave the institution an endowment. A college was built for the institution in 1340, outside of the mosque. In the late 1400s, the buildings were renovated and new dormitories were built for the students.

During this time Cairo had 70 other institutions of Islamic learning, however, Al-Azhar attracted many scholars due to its prestige. Ibn Khaldun taught at Al-Azhar starting in 1383.

During this time texts were few and much of the learning happened by students memorizing their teachers' lectures and notes. Blind young boys were enrolled at Al-Azhar in the hopes that they could eventually earn a living as teachers.

=== Ottomans ===
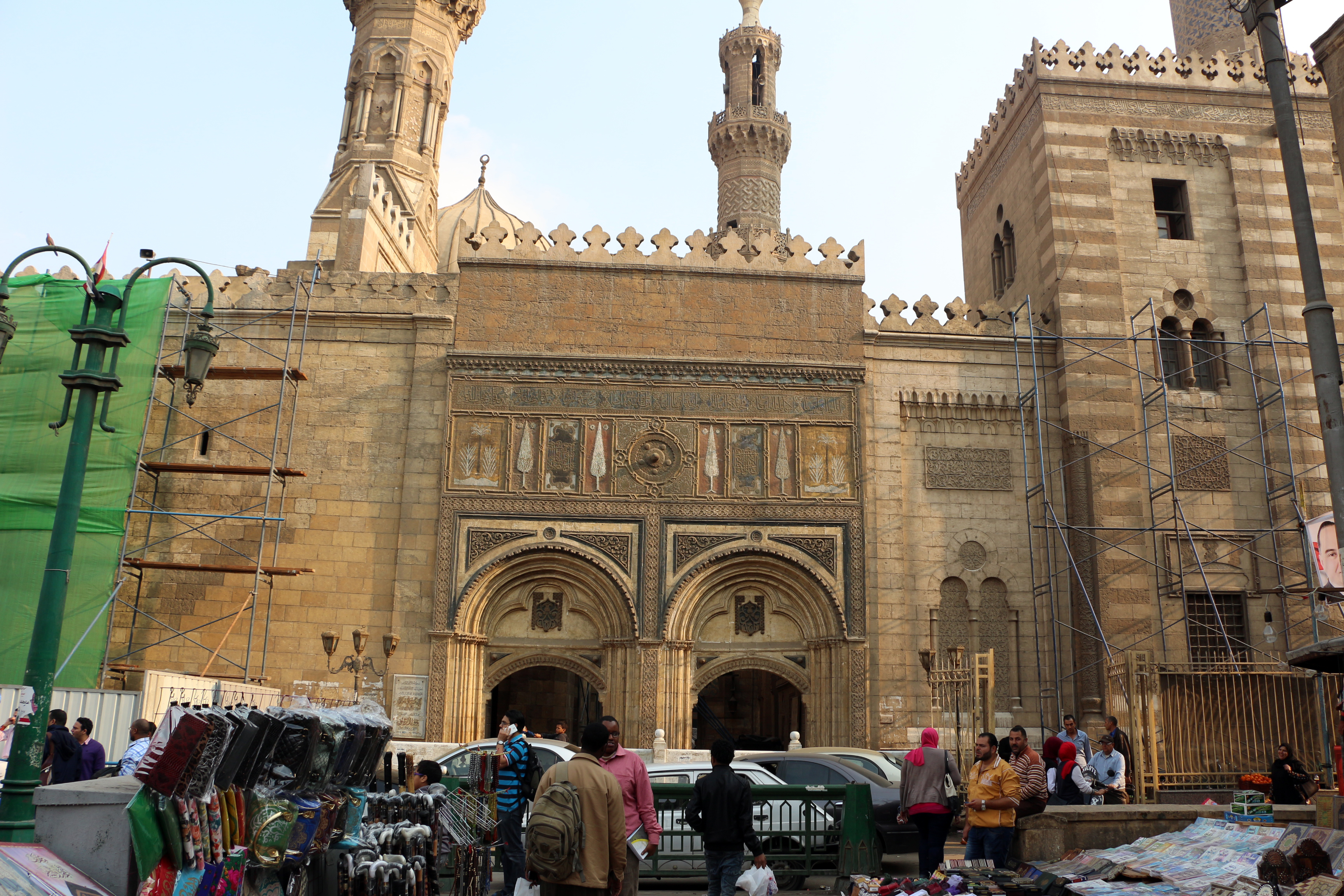
The Gate of the Barbers, one of the entrances to the mosque embellished during the Ottoman period

During the Ottoman period, Al-Azhar's prestige and influence grew to the point of becoming the preeminent institution for Islamic learning in the Sunni Muslim world. During this time, the Shaykh Al-Azhar was established, an office given to the leading scholar at the institution; prior to this the head of the institution was not necessarily a scholar. In 1748, the Ottoman pasha tried to get Al-Azhar to teach astronomy and mathematics, to little avail.

During the time there wasn't a system of academic degrees, instead the shaykh (professor) determined if the student was sufficiently trained to enter a professor (ijazah). The average length of study was 6 years. Despite the lack of bureaucracy, the training remained rigorous and prolonged. Students were loosely organized into riwaq (a sort of fraternity) organized according to their nationality and branch of Islamic law they studied. Each riwaq was supervised by a professor. A rector, usually a senior professor, oversaw the finances.

=== Post-Ottoman ===
By the mid 19th century, al-Azhar had surpassed Istanbul and was considered the capital of Sunni legal expertise; a main centre of power in the Islamic world; and a rival to Damascus, Mecca and Baghdad.

When the Kingdom of Egypt was established in 1923, the signing of the new nation's constitution was delayed because of King Fuad I's insistence that Al-Azhar and other religious institutions were to be subject to him and not the Egyptian parliament. The King Fuad I Edition of the Qur'an was first published on 10 July 1924 by a committee from Al-Azhar University Prominent committee members included Islamic scholar, Muhammad b. 'Ali al-Husayni al-Haddad. Noteworthy Western scholars/academics working in Egypt at the time include Bergsträsser and Jeffery. Methodological differences aside, speculation alludes to a spirit of cooperation. Bergsträsser was certainly impressed with the work.

In March 1924, Abdülmecid II had been deposed as Caliph, nominally the supreme religious and political leader of all Sunni Muslims across the world. The Grand Sheikh of al-Azhar repudiated the abolition and was part of a call from Al-Azhar for an Islamic conference. The unsuccessful "caliphate conference" was held under the presidency of the Grand Chancellor of Azhar in 1926 but no one was able to gain a consensus for the candidacy across the Islamic world. Candidates proposed for the caliphate included King Fuad.

=== Modernization ===
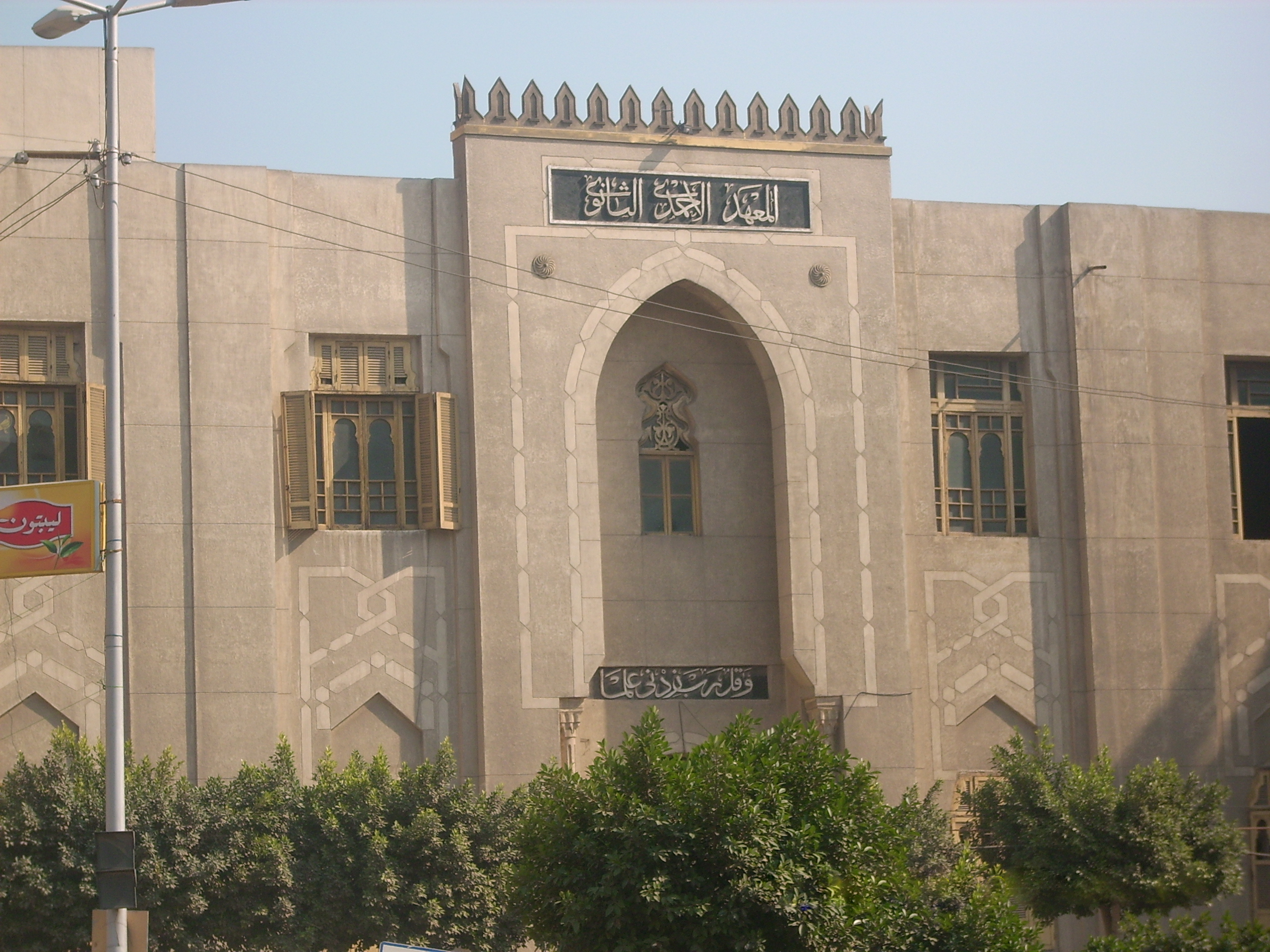
An Azhari institute in Tanta

The pioneering Pakistani journalist Zaib-un-Nissa Hamidullah became the first woman to address the university in 1955. In 1961, Al-Azhar was re-established as a university under the government of Egypt's second President Gamal Abdel Nasser when a wide range of secular faculties were added for the first time, such as business, economics, science, pharmacy, medicine, engineering and agriculture. Before that date, the Encyclopaedia of Islam classifies the Al-Azhar variously as madrasa, centre of higher learning and, since the 19th century, religious university, but not as a university in the full sense, referring to the modern transition process as "from madrasa to university". Other academic sources also refer to al-Azhar as a madrasa in pre-modern times before its transformation into a university. An Islamic women's faculty was also added in the same year.

=== Recent years ===
Since assuming office in 2014, Egyptian President Abdel Fattah el-Sisi has called on religious institutions, including Al-Azhar, to reform religious discourse in an effort to counter extremist ideologies that emerged in the aftermath of the Arab Spring uprisings.

In August 2021, forty-three Al-Azhar clerics stationed in Afghanistan since 2009 under an agreement with the Afghan Ministry of Education, were evacuated after the Taliban takeover of Kabul.

== Religious ideology ==
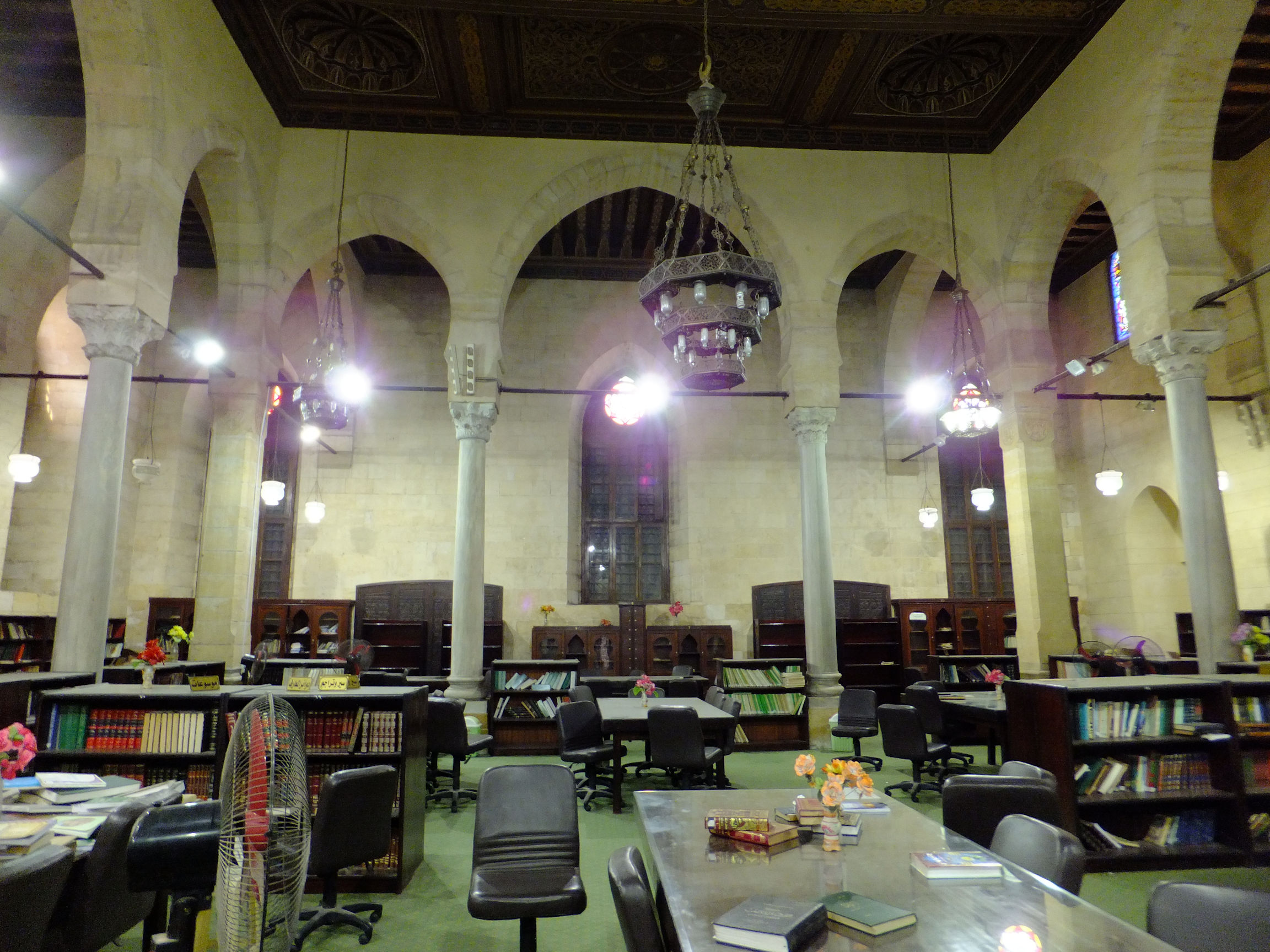
One of the study halls attached to the mosque

Historically, Al-Azhar had a membership that represented diverse opinions within Islam. The theological schools of al-Ash'ari and al-Maturidi were both represented. It has a long tradition of teaching all four schools of Sunni Islamic jurisprudence (Hanafi, Maliki, Shafi, and Hanbali). The chief mufti of each school of thought acted as the dean, responsible for the teachers and students in that group. During the time of the Ottomans, the Hanafi dean came to hold a position as primus inter pares. It also had membership from the seven main Sufi orders. Al-Azhar has had an antagonistic relationship with Wahhabism. According to a 2011 report issued by the Carnegie Endowment for International Peace, Al Azhar is strongly Sufi in character:

Adherence to a Sufi order has long been standard for both professors and students in the al-Azhar mosque and university system. Although al-Azhar is not monolithic, its identity has been strongly associated with Sufism. The current Shaykh al-Azhar (rector of the school), Ahmed el-Tayeb, is a hereditary Sufi shaykh from Upper Egypt who has recently expressed his support for the formation of a world Sufi league; the former Grand Mufti of Egypt and senior al-Azhar scholar Ali Gomaa is also a highly respected Sufi master.

However, in the early 20th century, enlightened Modernist thinkers such as Muhammad Abduh led a reform of the curriculum, reintroducing a desire for legal reform through ijtihad. Subsequently, disputes were had between modernist intellectuals and traditionalists within al-Azhar. Al-Azhar now maintains a modernist position, advocating "Wasatiyya" (centrism), a reaction against the extreme textualism of many Wahhabi Salafi ideologues. Wasatiyya covers a range of thinkers, some of whom are liberal intellectuals with religious inclinations, preachers such as Yusuf al-Qaradawi and many members of the Muslim Brotherhood. Since the 2013 coup however, Al-Azhar has taken a position against the brotherhood.

The nineteenth and current Grand Mufti of Egypt and Al Azhar scholar, is Shawki Ibrahim Abdel-Karim Allam. The university is opposed to overt liberal reform of Islam and issued a fatwa against the liberal Ibn Rushd-Goethe mosque in Berlin because it banned face-covering veils such as burqa and niqab on its premises while allowing women and men to pray together. The fatwa encompassed all present and future liberal mosques.

== Council of Senior Scholars ==
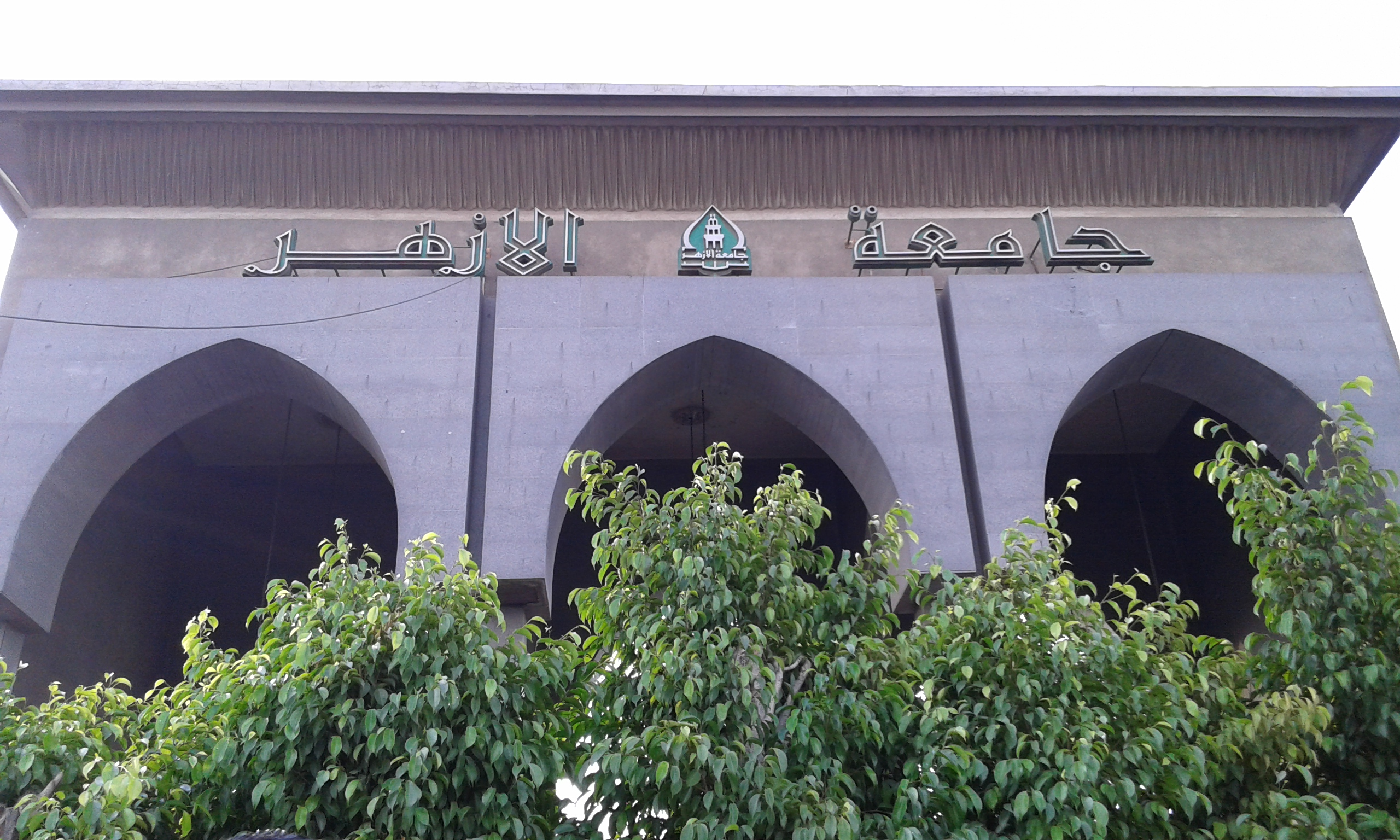
Al-Azhar University Campus

Al-Azhar University's Council of Senior Scholars was founded in 1911 but was replaced in 1961 by the Center for Islamic Research. In July 2012, after the law restricting Al-Azhar University's autonomy was modified by the incoming president Mohamed Morsi, the council was reformed. The Council consists of 40 members and as of February 2013 had 14 vacancies all appointed by the current imam of Al-Azhar, Ahmed El-Tayeb, who was appointed by the prior president, Hosni Mubarak. Once the remaining 14 vacancies are filled, new vacancies will be appointed by the existing Council itself. All four madhahib (schools) of Sunni Islamic jurisprudence are proportionally represented on the council (Hanafi, Shafi'i, Hanbali, Maliki) and voting is on a majority basis. In addition to El-Tayeb, other prominent members of the Council include the outgoing Grand Mufti Ali Gomaa. The council is tasked with nominating the Grand Mufti of Egypt (subject to presidential approval), electing the next Grand Imam of Al-Azhar Mosque, and is expected to be the final authority in determining if new legislation is compliant with Islamic law. Although the council's decisions are not binding (absent new legislation), it is expected that it would be difficult for the parliament to pass legislation deemed by the council as against Islamic law.

In January 2013, Al-Tayeb referred a relatively minor issue related to Islamic bonds to the council, for the first time asserting the council's jurisdiction. In 2013, the Council elected Shawki Ibrahim Abdel-Karim Allam to be the next Grand Mufti of Egypt. This marks the first time that the Grand Mufti would be elected by Islamic scholars since the position was created in 1895. Prior to this, the Egyptian head of state made the appointment.

== Views ==
Al-Azhar's muftis have a history of being consulted on political issues. Muhammad Ali Pasha appointed Al-Azhar muftis to the Consultative Council in 1829 and this would be repeated by Abbas I and later Isma'il Pasha. At the same time, there were many cases where the Egyptian ruler would disregard the opinion of Al-Azhar scholars. Sheikh Muhammad Sayyid Tantawy noted that among the priorities of Muslims are "to master all knowledge of the world and the hereafter, not least the technology of modern weapons to strengthen and defend the community and faith". He added that "mastery over modern weaponry is important to prepare for any eventuality or prejudices of the others, although Islam is a religion of peace".

Sheikh Tantawy also reasserted that his is the best faith to follow and that Muslims have the duty of active da'wa. He has made declarations about Muslims interacting with non-Muslims who are not a threat to Muslims. There are non-Muslims living apart from Muslims and who are not enemies of Islam ("Muslims are allowed to undertake exchanges of interests with these non-Muslims so long as these ties do not tarnish the image of the faith"), and there are "the non-Muslims who live in the same country as the Muslims in cooperation and on friendly terms, and are not enemies of the faith" ("in this case, their rights and responsibilities are the same as the Muslims so long as they do not become enemies of Islam"). Shi'a fiqh (according to a fatwa by Al-Azhar) is accepted as a fifth school of Islamic thought.

In October 2007, Muhammad Sayyid Tantawy, then the Grand Imam of Al-Azhar, drew allegations of stifling freedom of speech when he asked the Egyptian government to toughen its rules and punishments against journalists. During a Friday sermon in the presence of Egyptian Prime Minister Ahmed Nazif and a number of ministers, Tantawy was alleged to have stated that journalism which contributes to the spread of false rumours rather than true news deserved to be boycotted, and that it was tantamount to sinning for readers to purchase such newspapers. Tantawy, a supporter of then Egyptian President Hosni Mubarak, also called for a punishment of eighty lashes to "those who spread rumours" in an indictment of speculation by journalists over Mubarak's ill health and possible death. This was not the first time that he had criticized the Egyptian press regarding its news coverage nor the first time he in return had been accused by the press of opposing freedom of speech. During a religious celebration in the same month, Tantawy had released comments alluding to "the arrogant and the pretenders who accuse others with the ugliest vice and unsubstantiated charges". In response, Egypt's press union issued a statement suggesting that Tantawy appeared to be involved in inciting and escalating a campaign against journalists and freedom of the press. Tantawy died in 2010 and was succeeded by Mohamed Ahmed el-Tayeb.

In 2016 Ahmed el-Tayeb reissued the fatwa on Shia Muslims, calling Shia the fifth school of Islam and seeing no problem with conversions from Sunni to Shia Islam. However, the NGOs report that violence and propaganda against the country's Shia minority continues. Shia Muslims are frequently denied services in addition to being called derogatory names. Anti-Shia sentiment is spread through education at all levels. Clerics educated at Al-Azhar University publicly promote sectarian beliefs by calling Shia Muslims infidels and encourage isolation and marginalization of Shia Muslims in Egypt.

Scholars from Al-Azhar declared the writings to Farag Foda to be blasphemous. Muhammad al-Ghazali, a member of Al-Azhar, declared Foda to be guilty of apostasy. According to Geneive Abdo, Muhammad al-Ghazali also added that anyone killing an apostate would not be punished, while according to Nathan Brown, Muhammad al-Ghazali stopped just short of condoning Foroda's assassination. Foda was assassinated in June 1992, by an Egyptian terrorist group al-Jama'a al-Islamiyya, who claimed justification from Al-Azhar's fatwas. In response, a scholar at Al-Azhar published Man Qatala Faraj Fawda.

== Notable people ==
10th–17th centuries

- Sibt al-Maridini (1423–1495/1506, aged c. 72–83) Arab physicist, mathematician and astronomer
- Abd al-'Aziz al-Wafa'i (1408–1471, aged 63), Arab physicist, mathematician and astronomer
- Abd al-Qadir al-Baghdadi (1620–1682, aged c. 62) author, philologist, grammarian, magistrate, bibliophile and a leading literary figure of the Ottoman era.
- Nimr ibn Adwan (1735–1823, aged c. 88) Jordanian poet and chieftain.

19th – early 20th centuries

- Muhammad Abduh (1849–1905, aged 56), Egyptian activist and Grand Mufti, co-founder of Islamic Modernism.
- Sayd Jamal edin Afghani (1838/1839–1897, aged 58), Afghan or Iranian activist, co-founder of Islamic Modernism.
- Izz ad-Din al-Qassam (1882–1935, aged 52), Syrian anti-Zionist, founder and leader of Black Hand.
- Mohammad Amin al-Husayni (c. 1897–1974, 76/77), Mufti of Jerusalem.
- Ahmed Urabi (1841–1911, aged 70), Egyptian nationalist and army brigadier general who led the Urabi Revolt against Khedive Tewfik.

1910s–1950s

- Hassan al-Banna (1906–1949, aged 42), Egyptian schoolteacher, imam, founder of the Muslim Brotherhood, assassinated by State Security Investigations Service. (He graduated from Dar al-Ulum which is an affiliate of Cairo University)
- Syed Mujtaba Ali (1904–1974, aged 69), Bangladeshi author, journalist, travel enthusiast, academic, scholar and linguist; studied at the Al-Azhar University in Cairo during 1934–1935.
- Dr. Ayub Ali (1919–1995, aged 75/76), Bangladeshi Islamic scholar and educationist.
- Mehmed Handžić (1906–1944, aged 37), a leader of Bosnian revivalists, one of authors of Resolution of Sarajevo Muslims, and chairman of the Committee of National Salvation.
- Omar Abdel Rahman (1938–2017, aged 78), leader of Al-Gama'a al-Islamiyya, which has been designated a terrorist group by the governments of the United States and Egypt; died while serving a life term for the 1993 World Trade Center bombing.
- Taqi al-Din al-Nabhani (1914–1977, aged 62/63), the leader and founder of The Islamic Political Party, Hizb ut-Tahrir (The Party of Liberation).
- Sheikh Ahmed Yassin (1936–2004, aged 67), Palestinian politician, imam, co-founder and leader of Hamas, assassinated by Israel Defense Force.
- Saad Zaghlul (1857/1859–1927, aged 66/68) Egyptian revolutionary and statesman, leader of 1919 Egyptian revolution and Wafd Party.
- Taha Hussein (1889–1973, aged 83), Egyptian writer and intellectual.
- Muhammad Ma Jian (1906–1978, aged 72), Hui Chinese translator of the Qur'an into the Chinese language.
- Ahmad Meshari Al-Adwani (1923–1990, aged 67), Kuwaiti poet and writer of Kuwait's national anthem Al-Nasheed Al-Watani.
- Ahmad al-Ghumari (1902–1961, aged c. 59), Moroccan cleric, enrolled in 1921, dropped out due to a death in the family.
- Abdullah al-Ghumari (1910–1993, aged c. 83), Moroccan cleric, graduated from Azhar in 1931.
- Abu Turab al-Zahiri (1923–2002, aged 79), Indian-born Saudi Arabian linguist, jurist, theologian, and journalist.

1950–present

- Aliko Dangote (b. 1957), Nigerian business mogul, studied business at Al-Azhar.
- Akhtar Raza Khan (1943–2018, aged 74), Indian scholar, former Grand Mufti of India, founder of the Barelvi movement.
- Gholam Mohammad Niazi (1932–1979, aged c. 47), Afghan professor, father of Political Islam in Afghanistan, killed in prisoner massacre on promised day of release.
- Sayyid Abdurahman Imbichikoya Thangal (1922–2015, aged 93), Indian politician, former president of Samastha Kerala Jamiat-ul-Ulema (1995–2004), author of [Al Arab Wal Arabiyya(Arabs And Arabic Language)(Arabic: العرب والعربية )]
- Abdulla Saeed, Maldivian lawyer and judge, Chief Justice of the Maldives (2008–2010; 2014–2018), Justice of the Supreme Court of the Maldives (2010–2014).
- Zaib-un-Nissa Hamidullah (1918–2000, aged 81), Pakistani feminist and journalist who in 1955 became the first woman to give a speech at the university.
- Mohammed Burhanuddin (1915–2014, aged 98), 52nd Dā'ī al-Mutlaq of Dawoodi Bohras. Bohra researched and rediscovered Al-Azhar University's past history, awarded PhD from Al-Azhar University.
- Abdullah Yusuf Azzam (1941–1989, aged 48), Palestinian Sunni Islamic scholar, theologian, founder of the terrorist group Al-Qaeda, assassinated in unsolved car bombing.
- Shire Jama Ahmed (1936–1999, aged 62/63), Somali linguist who devised a Latin script for the Somali language.
- Mahmud Shaltut (1893–1963, aged 70), Grand Sheikh of Al-Azhar, issued in 1959 a Fatwa, declaring that Al-Azhar recognizes Shi'ism as a valid branch of Islam.
- Mahmoud Khalil Al-Hussary (1917–1980, aged 63), Egyptian qāriʾ and Qur'anic scholar.
- Abdel-Halim Mahmoud (1901–1978, aged 77), Egyptian philosopher and Grand Imam of Al-Azhar, introduced the study of Sufism as a science through his writings and lectures on the matter.
- Ahmed Subhy Mansour (b. 1949), Egyptian Islamic scholar, cleric, and founder of Quranism, who was exiled from Egypt, lived in the United States as a political refugee.
- Taha Jabir Alalwani (1935–2016, aged c. 86), Iraqi scholar, president of Cordoba University (Ashburn, VA, USA), founder and chairman of the Fiqh Council of North America, and the president of the International Institute of Islamic Thought in Herndon, Virginia (USA)
- Abdurrahman Wahid (1940–2009, aged 69), Indonesian politician, fourth President of Indonesia (1999–2001).
- Muhammad Sayyid Tantawy (1928–2010, aged 81), Egyptian scholar, Grand Mufti of Egypt (1986–1996), Grand Imam of Al-Azhar (1996–death).
- Ahmed el-Tayeb (b. 1946), Egyptian Islamic scholar, President of Al-Azhar University (2003–2010), Grand Imam of Al-Azhar (2010–present).
- Muhammad Metwally Al Shaarawy (1911–1998, aged 87), Egyptian Muslim jurist, Minister of Awqaf (1976–1978).
- Maumoon Abdul Gayoom (b. 1937), Maldivian politician, statesman, diplomat, and scholar, 3rd President of the Maldives (1978–2008).
- Abdulla Mohamed (b. 1966), Maldivian judge, Chief Judge of Criminal Court of the Maldives (2008–present).
- Salamat P. Hashim (1939–2003, aged 64), Filipino militant, co-founder and leader of the Moro Islamic Liberation Front in the Philippines.
- Sheikh Khalifa Usman Nando (1940/1941–2023, aged 81), co-founder of the Moro Islamic Liberation Front in the Philippines and Wa'lī of the Bangsamoro Autonomous Region in Muslim Mindanao.
- Fathulla Jameel (1942–2012, aged 69), Maldivian politician, Minister of Foreign Affairs of the Maldives (1978–2005).
- Burhanuddin Rabbani (1940–2011, aged 71), Afghan politician, teacher, Soviet–Afghan War Mujahideen leader, 6th President of Afghanistan.
- Mohamed Jameel Didi (1915–1989, aged 73), Maldivian author and writer.
- Nik Abdul Aziz Nik Mat (1931–2015, aged 84), Malaysian politician and Muslim cleric, Mursyidul Am of the Pan-Malaysian Islamic Party (PAS, 1991–death), Menteri Besar of Kelantan (1990–2013).
- Abdul Hadi Awang (b. 1947), Malaysian politician and religious teacher, 7th President of the Malaysian Islamic Party (PAS, 2002–present) and former Menteri Besar of Terengganu (1999–2004).
- Omar Maute (1980–2017, aged 37), Filipino Islamist militant, co-founder and leader of the Maute terrorist organization, killed in Siege of Marawi.
- Muhammad Ali Shihab Tangal (1936–2009, aged 73), Indian community leader, Islamic religious leader and scholar, politician. President of the Kerala state committee of the Indian Union Muslim League (1975-death).
- Saeed-ur-Rahman Azmi Nadvi (b. 1934), Indian Islamic scholar, 10th Principal of Darul Uloom Nadwatul Ulama (2000–present) and chancellor of Integral University.
- Timothy Winter (b. 1960), English academic, theologian and Islamic scholar. Founder of the Cambridge Muslim College, Aziz Foundation Professor of Islamic Studies at Cambridge Muslim College and Ebrahim College, director of studies (theology and religious studies) at Wolfson College, Cambridge, and Shaykh Zayed Lecturer in Islamic Studies in the Faculty of Divinity at the University of Cambridge.
- Mahmud Saedon (1943–2002, aged 58), Bruneian Muslim scholar.
- Mustafa Khattab, Canadian–Egyptian Muslim scholar, author, youth mentor, public speaker, imam, and university chaplain. English translator of the Qur'an and author of 'The Clear Quran' Series.
- Tariq Najm (b. 1945), Iraqi politician, Chief of Staff to the Prime Minister of Iraq (2006–2010), senior advisor.
- Quraish Shihab (b. 1944), Indonesian Muslim scholar in the sciences of Quran and Minister of Religious Affairs (1998).
- Alwi Shihab (b. 1946), Indonesian professor of religion and politician, 14th Minister of Foreign Affairs (1999–2001), Coordinating Minister for People's Welfare (2004–2005).
- Norarfan Zainal (b. 1973), Bruneian academician and educator, rector of Sultan Sharif Ali Islamic University (UNISSA, 2014–present) since 2014

== See also ==
- List of Islamic educational institutions
- Faculties of Al-Azhar University
- List of presidents of Al-Azhar University
- List of universities in Egypt
