= Handžić =

Handžić is a Bosnian surname. Notable people with the surname include: Asim Hasan Handzic born 1928 Kljuc Footballer nk Pdgrmec Sanski Most Hamdija Handzic born 1956 Footballer Nk Prijedor

- Faris Handžić (born 1995), footballer
- Haris Handžić (born 1990), footballer
- Irfan Handžić (born 1956), retired footballer
- Mehmed Handžić (1906–1944), Islamic scholar
