= Faculty of Medicine, Al-Azhar University, Cairo (girls) =

Women medical school in Egypt

Faculty of Medicine Al-Azhar University- Girls
- Type: Public
- Established: 1964
- Dean: Prof. Dr. Hanaa El-Ebeisy
- Academic staff: 714 (year 2008)
- Students: 1,869 (year 2008)
- Location: Nasr City, Cairo, Egypt
- Website: AFMG

Al-Azhar University Faculty of Medicine for Girls is a faculty of Al-Azhar University.

== Location ==
The Faculty of Medicine is located at Al-Azhar University in Nasr City, Egypt. The hospital is located at Al-Zahraa University Hospital in El Abaseya in Cairo, Egypt.

== History ==
The Faculty of Medicine for Girls, a part of Al-Azhar University, was established following the enactment of Law No. 103 in May 1961, which aimed at reorganizing Al-Azhar and its associated institutions.

The initiative to create this faculty began in 1964 with the university council's decision to establish a section for Medicine and Surgery studies. Initially, this section was affiliated with the Islamic Faculty for Girls, focusing on the Egyptian system of medical education, which includes teaching, research in diagnostic, curative, and preventive medicine, and the integration of Islamic studies and values.

Academic operations started in 1965 with the preliminary year, and subsequently, various academic and clinical departments were established. By 1969, the faculty had begun academic activities in its laboratories and clinical studies at Manshiet El-Bakry Hospital, following an agreement with the Egyptian Ministry of Health.

The year 1971 saw the introduction of postgraduate studies in all departments. In 1979, the faculty's status was elevated to an independent entity within the university through Republican Decree No. 116. Since then, it has shown significant growth and development in all departments, a trend that continues.

In 1983, the faculty expanded its facilities by acquiring Al-Zahraa University Hospital.

Presently, the Faculty of Medicine for Girls houses 31 departments and two specialized units. It offers a range of academic programs, including a bachelor's degree in Medicine and Surgery, 29 diploma programs, 34 master's degrees, and 32 doctorate degrees in various medical fields.

== Deans ==
- Prof. Dr. Nagwa Hassan Abdelaal from 2007 until 2011.
- Prof. Dr. Maha Akl from 2010 until now.
- prof. Dr Jazmen Ali Mohammed 2010 until 2011
- Prof. Dr. Sumaya El Shazly from 2017 until 2018.
- Prof. Dr. Nira Hassan Abdul Rahim Miftah from 2018 until 2020.
- Prof. Dr. Hanaa El-Ebeisy from 2022 until now.

== Departments ==
=== Academic ===
- Anatomy
- Physiology
- Histology
- Biochemistry
- Pharmacology
- Pathology
- Microbiology
- Parasitology
- Community medicine and industrial medicine
- Forensic medicine and toxicology

=== Clinical ===
- ENT
- Ophthalmology
- General medicine
- Cardiology
- Chest
- Clinical pathology
- Dermatology
- Endocrinology
- Neurology
- Psychiatry
- Tropical medicine
- Rheumatology and medical rehabilitation
- Pediatrics
- Gynecology and obstetrics
- General surgery
- Neurosurgery
- Urology
- Orthopedics
- Anesthesia
- Diagnostic radiology

=== Special units ===
- Immunology
- Virology
