= List of presidents of Al-Azhar University =

The following is a list of presidents of al-Azhar University since its nationalization in 1961. The reforms brought about by Act 103 of 1961 were the most sweeping in al-Azhar's history. They led to the loss of al-Azhar's independence and its incorporation into the Egyptian educational system as a full university.

== List ==
Name		Tenure	
Romanized	Arabic	Began	End
Muhammad Muhammad Amer el-Bahi	محمد محمد عامر البهي	1961	1964
Ahmad Hasan el-Baquri	أحمد حسن الباقوري	1964	1969
Badawi Abdel Latif Awad	بدوي عبد اللطيف عوض	1969	1974
Muhammad Hasan Fayed	محمد حسن فايد	1974	1979
Awad Allah Gad Higazi	عوض الله جاد حجازي	1979	1980
Muhammad el-Tayyeb el-Naggar	محمد الطيب النجار	1980	1983
Muhammad el-Sa'di Farhud	محمد السعدي فرهود	1983	1987
Abdel Fattah Husseini el-Sheikh	عبد الفتاح حسيني الشيخ	1987	1995
Ahmad Omar Hashem	أحمد عمر هاشم	1995	2003
Ahmad Muhammad Ahmad el-Tayyeb	أحمد محمد أحمد الطيب	2003	2010
Abdallah al-Husseini	عبد الله الحسيني	2010	2011
Usama al-Abd	أسامة العبد	2011	2014
Abdul Hai Azab	عبد الحي عزب	2014	2015
Ibrahim Hodhod	إبراهيم الهدهد	2015	2017
Ahmad Hasni	أحمد حسني	26 February 2017	5 May 2017
Mohamed al-Mahrasawii	محمد المحرصاوي	6 May 2017	present
