= List of faculties of Al-Azhar University =

Al-Azhar University includes the following faculties: (Directory of Faculties of Al-Azhar University according to the Coordination Office)

Faculties of Medicine

- Faculty of Medicine, Al-Azhar University, Cairo (boys)
- Faculty of Medicine, Al-Azhar University, Damietta (boys)
- Faculty of Medicine, Al-Azhar University, Assiut (boys)
- Faculty of Medicine, Al-Azhar University, Cairo (girls)
- Faculty of Medicine, Al-Azhar University, Damietta (girls)
- Faculty of Medicine, Al-Azhar University, Assiut (girls)

Dental Faculties

- Faculty of Dentistry, Al-Azhar University, Cairo (boys)
- Faculty of Dentistry, Al-Azhar University, Assiut (boys)
- Faculty of Dentistry, Al-Azhar University, Cairo (girls)

Faculties of Pharmacy

- Faculty of Pharmacy, Al-Azhar University, Cairo (boys)
- Faculty of Pharmacy, Al-Azhar University, Assiut (boys)
- Faculty of Pharmacy, Al-Azhar University, Cairo (girls)
- Faculty of Pharmacy, Al-Azhar University, Assiut (Girls)

Engineering faculties

- Faculty of Engineering, Al-Azhar University Cairo (boys)
- Faculty of Engineering, Al-Azhar University, Qena (boys)
- Faculty of Engineering, Al-Azhar University, Cairo (girls)

Faculties of Agriculture and Agricultural Engineering

- Faculty of Agricultural Engineering, Al-Azhar University, Cairo (boys)
- Faculty of Agricultural Engineering, Al-Azhar University, Assiut (boys)
- Faculty of Agriculture, Al-Azhar University, Cairo (boys)
- Faculty of Agriculture, Al-Azhar University, Assiut (boys)
- Faculty of Agriculture, Al-Azhar University, Sadat City (boys)

Faculties of Science and affiliated institutes

- Faculty of Science, Al-Azhar University Cairo (boys)
- Faculty of Science, Al-Azhar University, Assiut (boys)
- Faculty of Science, Al-Azhar University, Cairo (girls)
- Technical Institute, Faculty of Science, Al-Azhar University, Cairo (boys)
- Technical Institute, Faculty of Science, Al-Azhar University, Assiut (boys)
- Technical Institute, Faculty of Science, Al-Azhar University, Cairo (girls)

Faculties of Education

- Faculty of Education, Al-Azhar University, Cairo (boys)
- Faculty of Education, Al-Azhar University, Assiut (boys)
- Faculty of Education, Al-Azhar University, Tafahna Al Ashraf (Boys)
- Faculty of Education, Al-Azhar University, Cairo (girls)
- Faculty of Education, Al-Azhar University, Assiut (girls)

Faculties of Physical Education

- Faculty of Physical Education, Al-Azhar University, Cairo (boys)
- Faculty of Physical Education, Al-Azhar University, Cairo (girls)

Faculties of Commerce and affiliated institutes

- Faculty of Commerce, Al-Azhar University Cairo (boys)
- Faculty of Commerce, Al-Azhar University, Cairo (girls)
- Faculty of Commerce, Al-Azhar University, Tafahna Al Ashraf (Girls)
- Faculty of Commerce, Al-Azhar University, Assiut (girls)
- Institute of Management Information Systems, Faculty of Commerce in Cairo (boys)
- Institute of Management Information Systems, Faculty of Commerce in Cairo (Girls)
- Institute of Management Information Systems, Faculty of Commerce, Tafhouna Al-Ashraf (Girls)
- Institute of Management Information Systems, Faculty of Commerce, Assiut (Girls)

Fundamentals of Religion Faculties

- Faculty of Theology and Dawa, Al-Azhar University, Cairo (Boys)
- Faculty of Theology and Dawa, Al-Azhar University, Tanta (boys)
- Faculty of Theology and Dawa, Al-Azhar University, Mansoura (Boys)
- Faculty of Theology and Dawa, Al-Azhar University, Zagazig (Boys)
- Faculty of Theology and Dawa, Al-Azhar University, Menoufia (Boys)
- Faculty of Theology and Dawa, Al-Azhar University, Assiut (boys)

Girls’ colleges

- Al-Azhar Girls College, 10 of Ramadan, Al-Azhar University
- Al-Azhar Girls College in New Minya, Al-Azhar University
- Al-Azhar Girls College in Thebes, Al-Azhar University (Luxor)
- Al-Azhar Girls College in Aswan, Al-Azhar University
- Islamic Girls College in Assiut, Al-Azhar University
- Al-Azhar Girls College in Fayoum, Al-Azhar University

Sharia and Law faculties and affiliated institutes

- Faculty of Sharia and Law, Al-Azhar University, Cairo (boys)
- Faculty of Sharia and Law, Al-Azhar University, Assiut (boys)
- Faculty of Sharia and Law, Al-Azhar University, Tanta (boys)
- Faculty of Sharia and Law, Al-Azhar University, Tafahna Al Ashraf (Boys)
- Faculty of Sharia and Law, Al-Azhar University, Damanhour (Boys)
- Judicial Assistants Institute, Faculty of Sharia and Law in Cairo (boys)
- Judicial Assistants Institute, Faculty of Sharia and Law, Tanta (Boys)
- Judicial Assistants Institute, Faculty of Sharia and Law, Tafhouna Al-Ashraf (Boys)
- Institute of Judicial Assistants at the Faculty of Sharia and Law in Damanhour (boys)
- Judicial Assistants Institute, Faculty of Sharia and Law in Assiut (boys)

Arabic language faculties

- Faculty of Arabic Language, Al-Azhar University, Cairo (boys)
- Faculty of Arabic Language, Al-Azhar University, Menoufia (Boys)
- Faculty of Arabic Language, Al-Azhar University, Mansoura (Boys)
- College of Arabic Language, Al-Azhar University, Itay El-Baroud (Benin)
- Faculty of Arabic Language, Al-Azhar University, Zagazig (Boys)
- Faculty of Arabic Language, Al-Azhar University, Girga (Boys)
- Faculty of Arabic Language, Al-Azhar University, Assiut (boys)

Faculties of Islamic/Human Studies and affiliated institutes

- Faculty of Islamic and Arabic Studies, Al-Azhar University, Cairo (Boys)
- Faculty of Islamic and Arabic Studies, Al-Azhar University, Damietta (Boys)
- Faculty of Islamic and Arabic Studies, Al-Azhar University, Qena (Boys)
- Faculty of Islamic and Arabic Studies, Al-Azhar University, Aswan (Boys)
- Faculty of Islamic and Arabic Studies, Al-Azhar University, Didamoun (Boys)
- Faculty of Islamic and Arabic Studies, Al-Azhar University, Desouk (Boys)
- Faculty of Islamic and Arabic Studies, Al-Azhar University, Minya (Boys)
- Faculty of Islamic and Arabic Studies, Al-Azhar University in Sohag (girls)
- Faculty of Islamic and Arabic Studies, Al-Azhar University, Fayoum (Girls)
- Faculty of Islamic and Arabic Studies, Al-Azhar University, Al-Khanka (girls)
- Faculty of Islamic and Arabic Studies, Al-Azhar University, Al-Qurain (Girls)
- Faculty of Islamic and Arabic Studies, Al-Azhar University, Beni Suef (Girls)
- Faculty of Islamic and Arabic Studies, Al-Azhar University, Damanhur (Girls)
- Faculty of Islamic and Arabic Studies, Al-Azhar University, Sadat City (Girls)
- Faculty of Islamic and Arabic Studies, Al-Azhar University, Port Said (Girls)
- Faculty of Islamic and Arabic Studies, Al-Azhar University, Kafr El-Sheikh (Girls)
- Faculty of Islamic and Arabic Studies, Al-Azhar University, Zagazig (Girls)
- Faculty of Islamic and Arabic Studies, Al-Azhar University, Cairo (Girls)
- Faculty of Islamic and Arabic Studies, Al-Azhar University, Alexandria (Girls)
- Faculty of Islamic and Arabic Studies, Al-Azhar University, Mansoura (Girls)
- Faculty of Human Studies, Al-Azhar University, Tafahna Al Ashraf (Girls)
- Faculty of Human Studies, Al-Azhar University, Cairo (girls)
- Judicial Assistants Institute, Faculty of Islamic and Arabic Studies in Cairo (Girls)
- Judicial Assistants Institute, Faculty of Islamic and Arabic Studies in Mansoura (Girls)
- Faculty of Islamic Call, Al-Azhar University, Cairo (Boys)

Media faculties

- Faculty of Mass Communication, Al-Azhar University Cairo (boys)
- Faculty of Mass Communication, Al-Azhar University Cairo (girls) )
- Faculty of Artificial Intelligence, Al-Azhar University
- Faculty of the Holy Quran for Readings and their Sciences, Al-Azhar University, Tanta (boys)
- Faculty of Graduate Studies, Al-Azhar University

‌*Faculty of Islamic Sciences For Foreigners, Al-Azhar University

- Faculty of Home Economics, Al-Azhar University, Tanta (Girls)
- Faculty of Languages and Translation, Al-Azhar University, Cairo (Boys)

Nursing Faculties and institutes

- Faculty of Nursing, Al-Azhar University, Cairo (girls)
- Technical Institute of Nursing, Al-Azhar University, Cairo (girls)
- Technical Institute of Nursing, Al-Azhar University, Assiut (Girls)
- Technical Institute of Nursing, Al-Azhar University, Damietta
