= Usama al-Abd =

President of Al-Azhar University in Cairo, Egypt

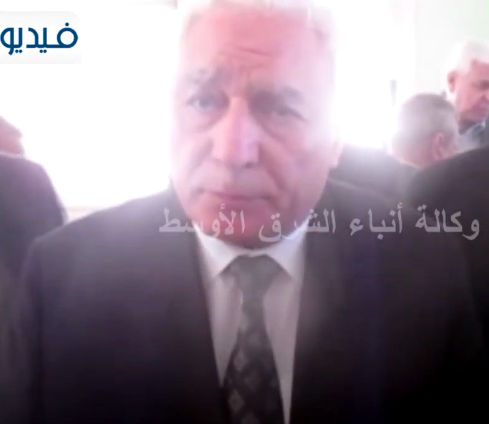
- Education: B.A., M.A., and PhD from Al Azhar University
- Occupation: President of Al Azhar University
- Years active: 2011 – 2014

Usama al-Abd (also spelled: Osama al-Abd; Arabic: أسامة العبد) is a former president of Al-Azhar University in Cairo, Egypt.

== Biography ==
Al-Abd is a 1975 graduate of Al-Azhar University. After serving for a stint as a teacher at Al-Azhar, he worked as an Attorney General for 10 years. In 1981, he earned a M.A. in Comparative Fiqh from Al-Azhar and in 1985, he completed a PhD in the same subject. Thereafter, he returned to academia and was appointed Professor of Shariah and Law again at Al-Azhar University. In 1988, he moved to Kuwait where he taught Islamic law. In 2003, he returned to Egypt where he was appointed Vice President of Al-Azhar University; in 2011, he was appointed President of Al-Azhar University. In April 2013, Al Azhar University's Council of Senior Scholars decided to hold elections to replace Al-Abd after a major food poisoning incident at Al-Azhar University's student hostel. He was later allowed to stay after hiring a new catering company.

In May 2014, Al-Abd announced that Al-Azhar University punished 1,301 students for their participation in anti-coup protests of which 131 were expelled outright from the university, 150 expelled from their dormitories, and 750 were referred to disciplinary boards. Al-Abd stated that primary goal of the university protests was to disrupt studying and denied siding with Egyptian government headed by Abdel Fattah el-Sisi. Al-Abd also stated the Muslim Brotherhood was an exclusionary group hostile to the sheikh of Al Azhar University, Ahmed el-Tayeb, and solely dedicated to returning to power in Egypt without consideration for dissent. Although some Brotherhood members were on the Al-Azhar University faculty, Al-Abd maintains the university will continue to adhere to "moderate and enlightened ideas and always rejects extremist ideas.”

Al-Abd is fluent in Arabic and French.
