= Ahmad Meshari Al-Adwani =

Kuwaiti poet

Ahmad Meshari al-Adwani
- Born: 1923; Kuwait City, Sheikhdom of Kuwait
- Died: June 17, 1990 (aged 66–67); Kuwait City, Kuwait
- Occupation: Poet
- Known for: Wrote the lyrics of the National Anthem of Kuwait

Ahmad Meshari al-Adwani (born 1923 — 17 June 1990) was a Kuwaiti poet and teacher who wrote the lyrics of the National Anthem of Kuwait.

== Career ==
In 1938, he graduated from the Al-Mubarakiyah Secondary School, Kuwait. In 1939 he travelled to Cairo, Egypt and was admitted into the college of Arabic Language Studies at the Al-Azhar University. In 1949 he graduated from the Al-Azhar University. In 1950 Al-Adwani established the monthly magazine Al-Be'thah in Cairo, with his friend and companion, Dr. Abdulaziz Hussein. Due to lack of funding, however, the magazine was stopped after only three issues. In 1952 he helped establish the "Al-Ra'ed" magazine, published by the Kuwait Teachers Club.

== Death ==
He died on 14 June 1990 at the age of 67.
