= Norarfan Zainal =

Bruneian academician and educator (born 1973)

Dato Seri Paduka Norarfan Zainal DSSUB SNB PSB PKL
- نورعرفان زينل
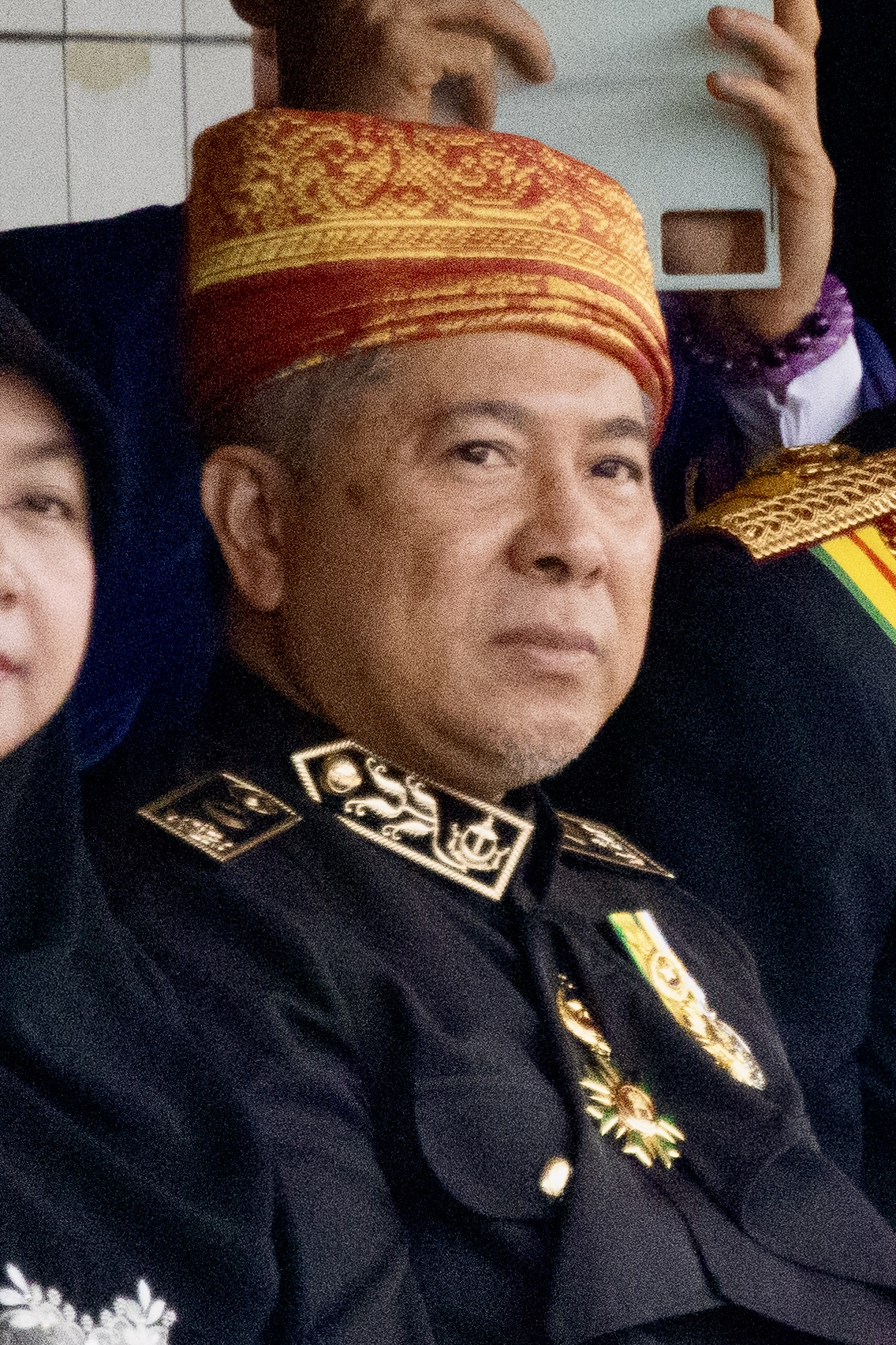
- Dato Norarfan in 2024
- Born: 19 March 1973 (age 53); Brunei
- Education: Al-Azhar University (BA); Al al-Bayt University (MA); International Islamic University Malaysia (PhD)

Academic work
- Sub-discipline: Islamic studies, and Islam and education in Brunei
- Institutions: Universiti Brunei Darussalam; Seri Begawan Religious Teachers University College; Sultan Sharif Ali Islamic University

Norarfan bin Zainal (born 19 March 1973) is an academician and educator from Brunei who served as the rector of Sultan Sharif Ali Islamic University (UNISSA) since 2014. Additionally, he is a member of Islamic Council of Brunei Darussalam and a council member of the Seri Begawan Religious Teachers University College (KUPU SB).

== Early life and education ==
Norarfan bin Haji Zainal was born on 19 March 1973, in Brunei Darussalam. He pursued his studies, earning a Bachelor of Arts (Hons) in Hadith from Al-Azhar University, Egypt from 1992 to 1996. He continued his academic journey by obtaining a Master of Arts in Akidah from Al al-Bayt University, Jordan from 2000 to 2002, and later a Doctor of Philosophy (PhD) in Usuluddin and Comparative Religion from the International Islamic University of Malaysia from 2005 to 2009.

== Career ==
Norarfan started his professional career at the Syariah Affairs Department of the Ministry of Religious Affairs (MoRA) in 1997 as a Religious Officer in the Bahagian Kawalan Akidah (BKA). After that, he moved into academia, working at Universiti Brunei Darussalam (UBD)'s Sultan Haji Omar 'Ali Saifuddien Institute of Islamic Studies (IPISHOAS) as a lecturer in 2002, and tutor in 2000. Later, in 2007, he was hired as a lecturer at UNISSA. After that, he worked in administrative positions at KUPU SB, serving as assistant ra'es in 2011 and deputy ra'es in 2014. He has been UNISSA's rector since 26 June 2014.

To suggest increasing educational cooperation, including raising the number of Palestinian students at UNISSA through Brunei's scholarships, Norarfan met with Anwar H. Al-Agha, the non-resident ambassador of Palestine to Brunei, on 22 February 2017. In light of a memorandum of understanding (MoU) with Istanbul Sabahattin Zaim University, Norarfan met with Mehmet Suat Akgὕn, the Turkish Ambassador to Brunei, on 1 June, to discuss possible academic cooperation between UNISSA and Turkish universities.

In February 2020, Norarfan headed a trip to Russia, where he met with important government and religious figures and signed MoU with the Dagestan Institute of Humanities and Kunta-Haji Russian Islamic University.

In late 2023 and early 2024, the UNISSA's faculties and other events raised B$13,000 for the Humanitarian Fund for Palestinians in Gaza 2023, which Norarfan Zainal gave to Minister Nazmi. Later in February, he traveled to Al-Azhar University for the International Conference of Kitab Turats and Its Challenges in the Malay Realm. There, he gave a keynote address about the importance of Turat studies in Brunei, which is led by the Sultan. In order to work together on industry training, internships, and academic programs related to human capital development in Islamic finance, he and PT Fin Centerindo Satu (FIN SATU) of Indonesia signed a MoU.

On 5 July 2024, in his capacity as the 15th KAIB Steering Committee Chairman, greeted the Sultan at the Borneo Islamic International Conference. In his speech, he underlined the purpose of the conference, which is to promote a sustainable Islamic community by fostering information exchange and cross-sector collaboration to accomplish Sustainable Development Goals. On 27 August, Norarfan and Kolej International Graduate Studies (KIGS) inked a memorandum of agreement with the goal of promoting higher education while maintaining MIB principles and preparing students for success in the classroom and in the workplace in the future.

== Other works ==
In the scholarly realm, he has authored many works on faith, education, and Islamic civilisation. He has also actively participated in domestic and international seminar presentations. He has both independently and collaboratively produced a number of research publications, consisting of:

- Mahmud Saedon Awang Othman (2002). Ajaran sesat di negara Brunei Darussalam: satu tinjauan (in Malay). Bandar Seri Begawan: Pusat Da'wah Islamiah, Kementerian Hal Ehwal Ugama. ISBN 9991735232.
- Isu-isu aqidah di Negara Brunei Darussalam (in Malay). Bandar Seri Begawan: Pusat Da'wah Islamiah, Kementerian Hal Ehwal Ugama. 2011. ISBN 9789991755441.
- Isu-isu penyelewengan akidah di Negara Brunei Darussalam (in Malay). Bandar Seri Begawan: Pusat Penerbitan, Kolej Universiti Perguruan Ugama Seri Begawan. 2011. ISBN 9789991744810.
- Jambatan sinar ke tanah suci: catatan perjalanan jema'ah haji Brunei Darussalam dari tahun 1956 hingga 2004 (in Malay). Bandar Seri Begawan: Pusat Penerbitan, Kolej Universiti Perguruan Ugama Seri Begawan. 2012. ISBN 9789991761107.
- Perkembangan Institusi Pengajian Tinggi Islam (PITI) di Brunei Darussalam: harapan dan realiti (in Malay). Bandar Seri Begawan: Pusat Penerbitan, Kolej Universiti Perguruan Ugama Seri Begawan. 2013.
- Melestari Pendidikan Islam di Negara Brunei Darussalam (in Malay). Bandar Seri Begawan: UNISSA Press. 2015. ISBN 9789991765501.
- Rose Abdullah (2018). Kegemilangan UNISSA, mencorak masa depan ummah (in Malay). Bandar Seri Begawan: UNISSA Press. ISBN 9789991782935.
- Rose Abdullah (2019). A Journey, Shapping the Future of the Ummah. Bandar Seri Begawan: UNISSA Press. ISBN 9789991786384.

== Honours ==
Norarfan has earned the following honours;

- Order of Islam Brunei Second Class (DSSUB; 15 July 2024) – Dato Seri Setia
- Order of Setia Negara Brunei Third Class (SNB; 15 July 2019)
- Order of Setia Negara Brunei Fourth Class (PSB; 29 August 2015)
- Long Service Medal (PKL)

Academic offices
Preceded by Serbini Matahir	Rector of Sultan Sharif Ali Islamic University; 2014–present	Succeeded by Incumbent
