= Ibrahim Al-Soula =

Kuwaiti composer

- Born: Ibrahim Nasser Ibrahim Al-Soula; 1935; Kuwait City, Sheikhdom of Kuwait
- Died: October 4, 2016 (aged 80–81); Mubarak Al-Kabeer Hospital, Kuwait
- Occupation: Composer
- Known for: Composing the National Anthem of Kuwait

Ibrahim Nasser Ibrahim Al-Soula (1935 — 4 October 2016) was a Kuwaiti composer. He was considered one of the founders of Kuwaiti musical art.

== Early life ==
He was born in the neighborhood of Jibla. He grew up in an artistic family and loved Sumerian folk art which had a great impact on the creativity of the artist. He holds a higher diploma in musical instruments from the Higher Institute of Arabic Music in Cairo.

== Career ==
In his early artistic career, he worked at the Worker's Cultural Center 1960 and then at the Folk Arts Care Center 1961. He worked as a supervisor at the Kuwait Radio Studio and was appointed head of the music department 1981.

His first recorded song was Ya Rasool Al-Zain with lyrics by the artist Badr Bursali and music and singing by the artist Saud Al-Rashed, and his first Samari tune was for the song Salamoli sung by the artist Ghareed Al-Shatea.

He also presented many artistic works for major artists, and the National Anthem of Kuwait is considered the most prominent tune he presented throughout his artistic career.

== Death ==
He died in Mubarak Al-Kabeer Hospital in Kuwait, on the morning of Tuesday, October 4, 2016, at the age of 81, after a struggle with illness.
