= 'Abd al-'Aziz al-Wafa'i =

15th-century Egyptian astronomer and mathematician

Abd al-'Aziz ibn Mahammad al-Qahiri al-Shafi' al-Wafa'i
- Born: 811 AH /1408; Cairo, Egyptian Mamluk Sultanate
- Died: 876 AH/ 1471 (aged 63)
- Occupations: Astronomer, mathematician, time keeper
- Era: Mamluk era
- Notable work: Risalah al-'Amal bi al-Rub' al-Mujayyab

'Abd al-'Aziz ibn Mahammad al-Qahiri al-Shafi' al-Wafa'i known as Ibn al-Aqba'i (1408–1471) was an Egyptian astronomer and mathematician in the 15th century. He was born in 811 H.E. (1408 AD) and died in 876 H.E (1471 AD). Some sources say that he died in 874 or 879 H.E. He was a student of Ibn al-Majdi and Nur al-din al-Naqqash. He became a time keeper at the Mosque of Sultan al-Muayyad in Cairo. He also became the chief of the time keepers of the Azhar mosque and the Maridani Mosque. He was interested in the calculation of the local times of cities based on their latitude and longitude. He invented an astronomical device called Da'irah al-Mu'addal.

He wrote about 40 books and 20 treatises on mathematics and astronomy, none of them published. Among his works is the manuscript Risalah al-'Amal bi al-Rub' al-Mujayyab
