= Sultan Sharif Ali Islamic University =

National university in Brunei

- Universiti Islam Sultan Sharif Ali (Malay) جامعة السّلطان الشّريف عليّ الإسلاميّة (Jawi)
- Logo of UNISSA
- Motto: Oleh itu hendaklah kamu bertaqwa kepada Allah. Dan Allah mengajar kamu (Malay)
- Motto in English: Observe your duty to Allah, and it is Allah that teaches you
- Type: Public research university
- Established: 1 January 2007
- Founder: Sultan Hassanal Bolkiah
- Accreditation: AAUF; AIU; AIUA; APUCEN; AUAP; AUN; UNAI
- Religious affiliation: Sunni Islam
- Academic affiliations: ACU; ICESCO; IUL
- Chairperson: Romaizah Mohd Salleh
- Chancellor: Sultan Hassanal Bolkiah
- Rector: Associate Professor Dr Awang Abdul Nasir bin Haji Abdul Rani
- Pro-Chancellor: Crown Prince Al-Muhtadee Billah
- Total staff: 350 (2024)
- Students: 1798 (2024)
- Location: Simpang 347, Jalan Pasar Gadong, Bandar Seri Begawan, BE1310, Brunei Darussalam; 4°54′20.5″N 114°54′47.8″E
- Campus: Metropolitan and regional with multiple sites
- Colours: Green White
- Website: www.unissa.edu.bn

The Universiti Islam Sultan Sharif Ali (UNISSA or Sultan Sharif Ali Islamic University) is a public research university located in Bandar Seri Begawan, Brunei, established in 2007. As the country’s first Islamic university and second national institution, UNISSA focuses on developing Muslim scholars and intellectuals who contribute to both national development and the wider Muslim community.

The university strives to ensure that its programs meet international standards and align with contemporary needs to enhance the quality of its academic offerings. Its mission is to foster a sustainable educational environment based on the principles of Maqasid Shariah.

== Etymology ==
The Islamic prophet Muhammad's descendant Barkat Ali ibnu Sharif Ajlan ibnu Sharif Rumaithah, often known as Sharif Ali, was named the third Sultan of Brunei after marrying the daughter of his predecessor, Sultan Ahmad. He was the first sultan to construct a mosque in Brunei, but in 1945–1946, Allied bombardment destroyed it during World War II.

== History ==
During the 16th and 17th convocations of the Universiti Brunei Darussalam (UBD) in 2004 and 2005, Sultan Hassanal Bolkiah introduced the idea of establishing a second university in Brunei, specifying that it would be an Islamic university. The objective was to create a centre for the promotion of Islam in the region.

Universiti Islam Sultan Sharif Ali (UNISSA) was officially founded on 1 January 2007 and admitted its first cohort of students in August of the same year, with 27 doctoral candidates and 125 undergraduates. Initially, UNISSA operated through the Sultan Omar 'Ali Saifuddien Centre for Islamic Studies (SOASCIS), a faculty previously part of UBD, as it lacked a permanent location. In February 2009, the university moved to a new campus in Gadong, previously home to the Pengiran Anak Puteri Rashidah Sa'adatul Bolkiah College of Nursing. On 1 August 2009, three UBD Library staff members were assigned to establish the UNISSA Library.

== Organisation and administration ==
Qualified candidates must meet the general and program-specific entrance requirements in order to be taken into consideration. Meeting these prerequisites, however, does not ensure admission because admission is competitive and space-limited. Incomplete or forged applications may be rejected by UNISSA, which only takes into account credentials from accredited universities. Only certain Brunei and GCE 'A' Level credentials, (Note: At UNISSA, points for GCE 'A' Level grades are distributed according to the UCAS system; Advanced Subsidiary (AS) Levels are not taken into account. In order to be considered for English-medium programs, candidates must have at least a GCE 'O' Level Credit 6 in English language, an IGCSE English as a second language grade of "C," an IELTS score of 6.0, or a TOEFL score of 550. Candidates also need to pass the al-Quran al-karim recitation examination, if relevant, and the Primary School Religious Certificate exam, or its equivalent.) with a maximum of than three proceedings in the previous three years, are acceptable for first-degree programs. General Paper, English (as a second language), and other GCE credentials are not recognised; however, other qualifications, such as an HNDs, can be taken into consideration if they fulfil program criteria. If mature students satisfy certain standards, they could be admitted; further conditions, such medical tests and interviews, might also be necessary.

=== Governance ===
The Universiti Islam Sultan Sharif Ali Act outlines the authorities of UNISSA, which include various organisations as specified by legislation, such as the Council, Senate, Board of Studies, Board of an Institution, Boards of Selection, and Board of Student Welfare. The methods, composition, and functions of these authorities are detailed in the university's Constitution. The Council serves as the executive body of the university, exercising all powers conferred by the university's charter, laws, and regulations, except those explicitly assigned to other bodies, officials, or authorities. The executive officers at UNISSA are as follows:

- Rector
- Acting Deputy Rector(Policy and Corporate)
- Assistant Rector (Research & International)
- Assistant Rector (Academic)
- Assistant Rector (Student Affairs & Alumni)
- Registrar

=== Faculties and programmes ===
Universiti Islam Sultan Sharif Ali (UNISSA) comprises seven faculties and eight centres. The faculties include the Faculty of Usuluddin, Faculty of Shariah and Law, Faculty of Arabic Language, Faculty of Islamic Economics and Finance, Faculty of Islamic Development Management, Faculty of Agriculture, and Faculty of Islamic Technology. The centres of excellence consist of the Halalan Thayyiban Research Centre, Mazhab Shafi‘i Research Centre, Centre for Leadership and Lifelong Learning, Centre for Graduate Studies, and Centre for the Promotion of Knowledge and Languages. Additionally, management centres include the Centre for Research and Publication, Centre for Public and International Relations, and Centre for Technology and Multimedia.

Students pursuing a bachelor's degree at UNISSA who achieve a cumulative GPA of 3.55 or higher during their first two years of study are eligible to participate in a study abroad program. This program allows students to study for one year, or two semesters, at UNISSA's partner institutions located in the Middle East, the United Kingdom, or Malaysia. The program aims to expose students to different educational systems, lifestyles, and cultures while promoting the moral principles of Islam and encouraging qualities of global citizenship.

Additionally, the Minor Programme at UNISSA is designed to provide students with interdisciplinary learning opportunities, fostering the development of skilled and versatile graduates. This initiative aims to enhance the marketability of graduates through a range of available minors, including Contemporary Da‘wah, Shariah Law, Translation, Islamic Economics, Information and Communication Technology, and Halal Science.

== Academic profile ==
=== Rankings ===
The Institute for Policy and Strategy on National Competitiveness (IPSNC) released the World's Universities with Real Impact (WURI) ranking in 2022, and UNISSA made its debut there. It placed among the top 200–300 overall in the ranking system, while its Faculty of Islamic Economics and Finance (FEKIm) entrepreneurship project course placed among the top 51–100 in the area of entrepreneurial spirit. For the past two years (2022 and 2023), UNISSA has been rated in the top 201-300 position in the World University Rankings for Innovation (WURI). The university is ranked 221st in the 2024 edition.

=== International partnerships ===
UNISSA has international membership in the Association of Commonwealth Universities (ACU), Islamic Universities League (IUL), Asian Islamic Universities Association (AIUA), ASEAN University Network (AUN), Asia-Pacific University-Community Engagement Network (APUCEN), International Association of Universities (AIU), Islamic World Educational, Scientific and Cultural Organization (ICESCO), Association of the Universities of Asia and the Pacific(AUAP) Afro-Asian University Forum (AAUF) and United Nations Academic Impact (UNAI).

UNISSA has signed memorandum of understanding (MoU) and agreements with several foreign universities such as Universitas Negeri Malang, Bilad Al-Syam University, Islamic University of Maldives, Princess of Naradhiwas University, Kunta-Haji Russian Islamic University, and many other universities and institutions. In March 2023, UNISSA and Huawei Technologies signed an MoU to promote cooperation and innovation in the field of information and communication technology (ICT) for the university's academic initiatives.

== Student life ==
Around 1,045 students from UNISSA started both hybrid and in-person classes in January 2022 at its campuses in Sinaut, Tutong District, and Gadong, Brunei–Muara District. UNISSA also carried on with its online instruction and learning sessions based on how well the courses fit the available modules.

=== International students ===
On 27 August 2022, UNISSA celebrated its foreign students with an international day. Students from Singapore, Indonesia, Thailand, Egypt, China, Japan, Pakistan, Palestine, Nepal, Morocco, Nigeria, Ghana, Kenya, and the Gambia displayed their cultures during the event, which had as its subject "International Identity and Spirit." The pupils displayed customary attire, pastimes, and cuisine from their own nations. The cultural exchange included skit shows, film screenings, and a platform for overseas students to share.

=== Residential colleges ===
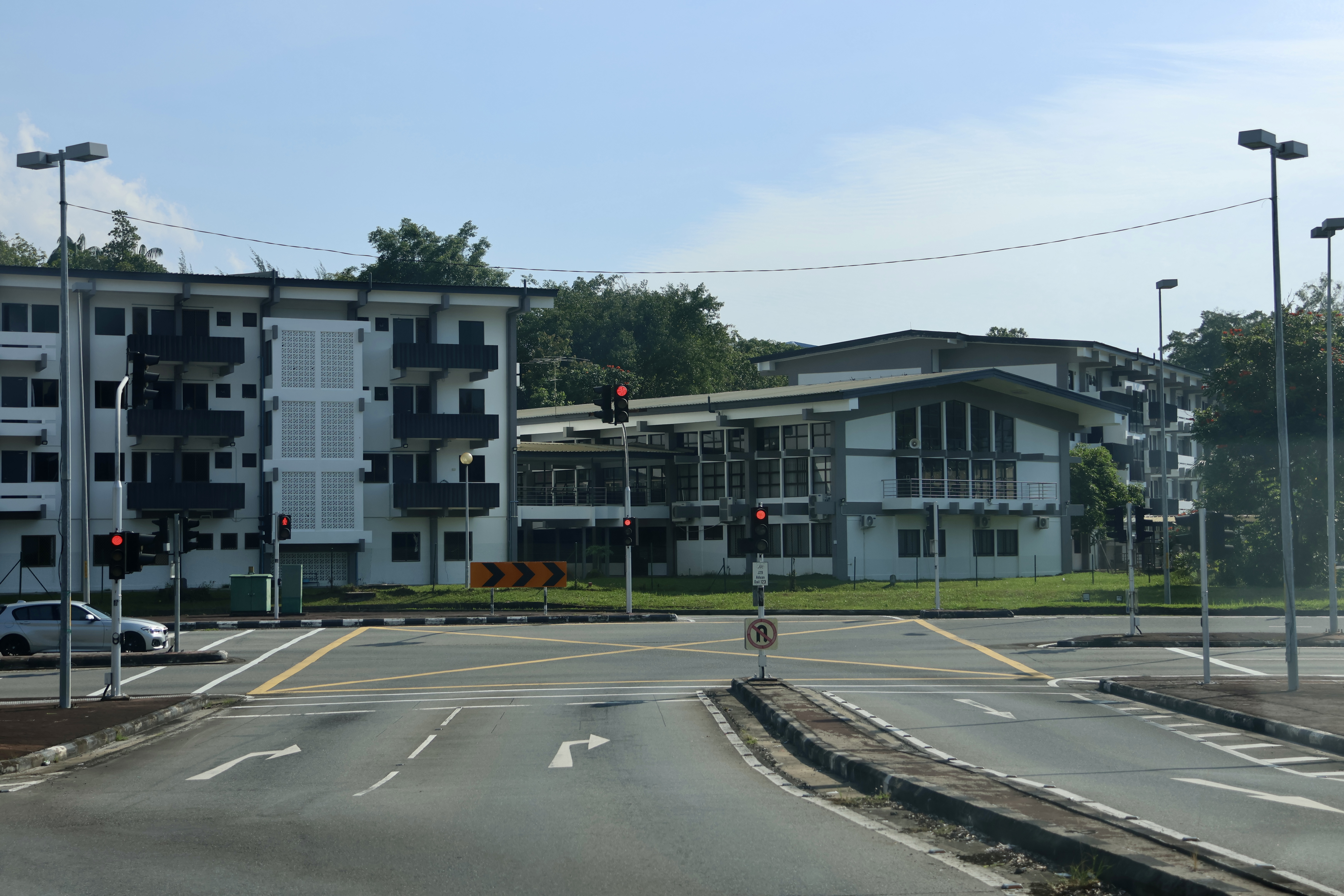
UNISSA Residential College

The general management of on-campus housing is overseen by the UNISSA Residential College Unit, which is headed by two Residential College Managers. Maintaining a pleasant living environment, organising resident activities, assuring resident welfare, and promoting a polite and peaceful community are some of its goals. Coordination of student registration and placement, facility maintenance management in conjunction with the Estate Office, resident safety and welfare monitoring, advisory work for the Residential College Executive Committee (ExCo) under the UNISSA Student Association, and resident event planning are among the main duties.

=== Chancellor's Trophy ===
Since its founding in 2021, the Chancellor's Trophy aims to encourage the expansion of sports, rivalries, and friendships among Brunei's public and private higher education institutions. The Chancellor's Trophy also highlights the leaders of the separate student councils and the university working together. The winner of the Chancellor's Trophy 2022 was UBD, with UNISSA coming in second and Universiti Teknologi Brunei (UTB) in third.

== Campus ==
=== Gadong Campus ===
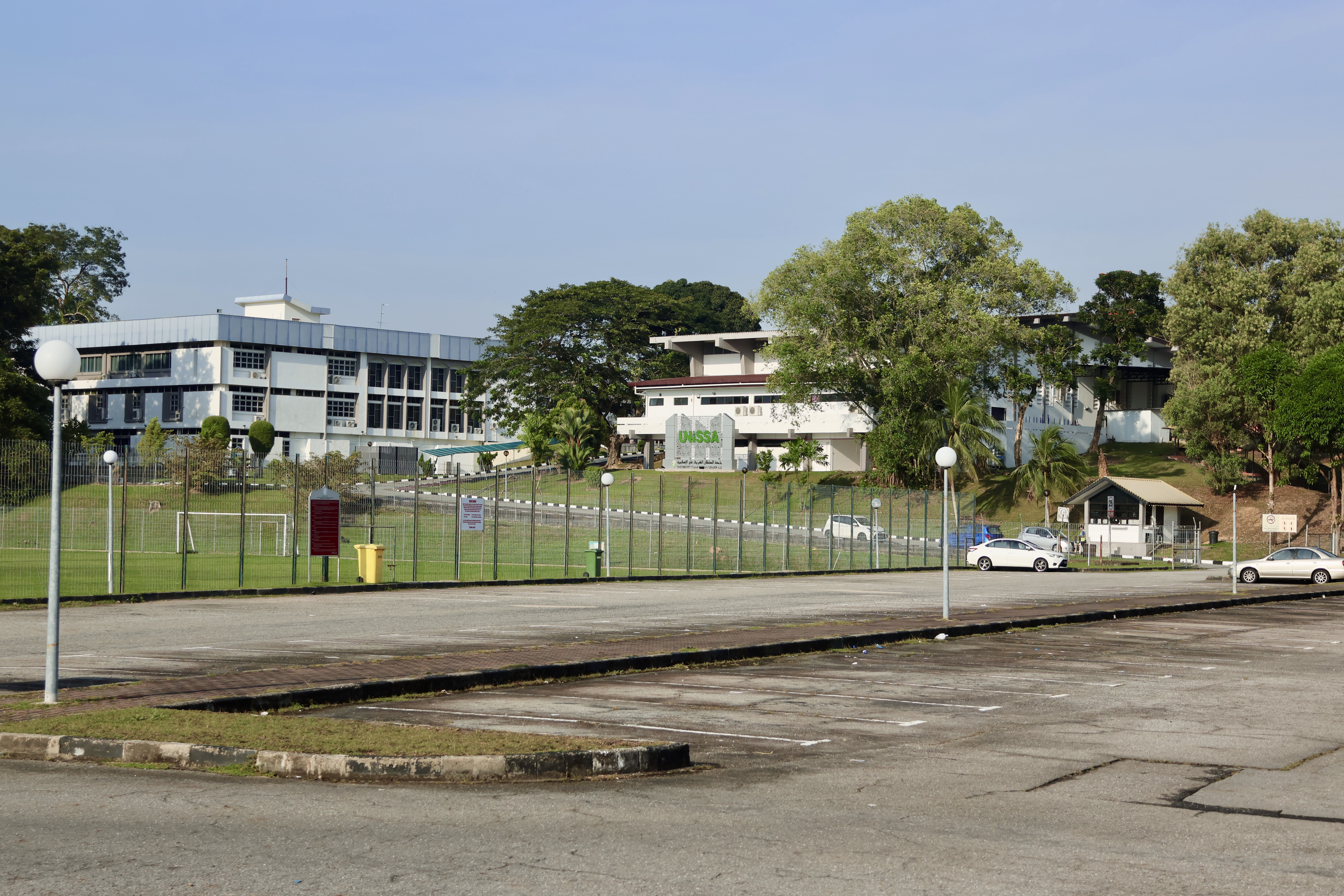
Gadong Campus

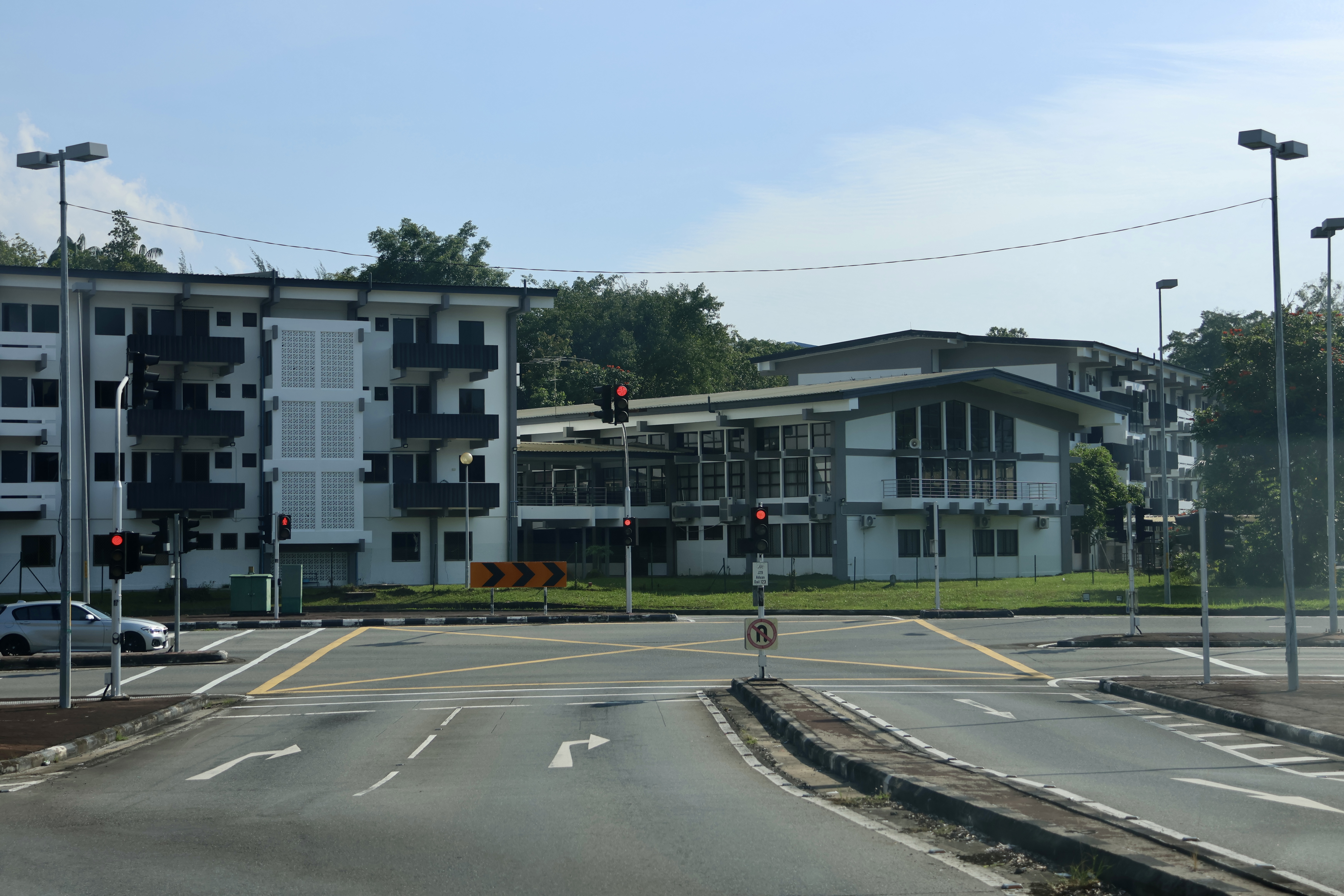
UNISSA Residential College

Established in 2022, Universiti Islam Sultan Sharif Ali (UNISSA) operates from a temporary campus equipped with essential facilities, including Surau Al-Shafi'i, a gymnasium, a library with over 120,000 volumes, computer labs, student residential colleges, a football field, Jubilee Hall, an auditorium, a moot court, and a Senate conference room.

The UNISSA Centre for Public and International Relations focuses on enhancing the university’s reputation through strategic partnerships with regional, national, and international organisations. Its objectives include maintaining relationships with local stakeholders, media, and global institutions, while facilitating legal processes for memoranda of understanding (MoUs) and agreements (MOAs).

The Centre for Leadership and Lifelong Learning (C4L), located at the UNISSA Gadong Campus, was founded in 2017. It provides training programs and courses focused on Islamic human development, promoting continuous learning for professional and personal growth, and supporting the public and private sectors through comprehensive educational programs.

=== Sinaut Campus ===
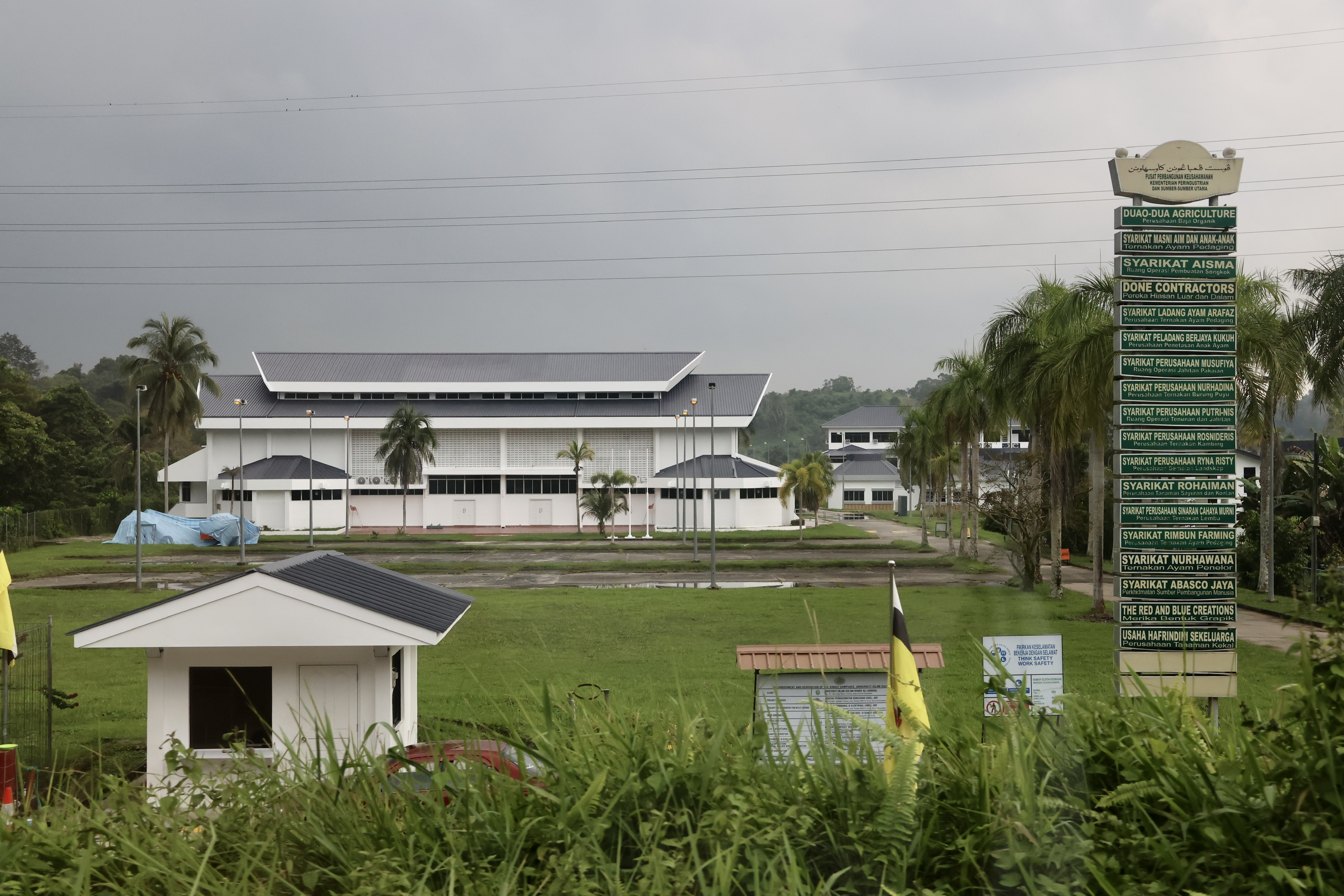
Sinaut Agricultural Training Centre

On 15 June 2021, UNISSA acquired its second campus, later named the UNISSA Sinaut Campus, located at the Sinaut Agricultural Training Centre. The Faculty of Agriculture was relocated to this new site to accommodate a growing student body and the increasing demand for faculty facilities. Initially, the faculty was planned to be housed at the upcoming UNISSA campus in Temburong District. The new campus will include administrative buildings, lecture halls, dormitories, canteens, scientific laboratories, residential facilities, and multipurpose halls, aimed at improving the environment for students and staff.

The Halalan Thayyiban Research Centre, established on 29 April 2017 and officially opened on 7 July 2017, focuses on advancing research, education, and professional services in the halal industry, contributing to the goals of Wawasan Brunei 2035. The centre's objectives include offering academic programs, conducting research, product authentication, and addressing halal-related societal challenges.

=== Piasau-Piasau Campus ===
On 13 July 2022, UNISSA held a Doa Selamat ceremony to mark the commencement of construction on its new campus in Kampong Piasau-Piasau, Temburong District. As part of the project, 50 hectares (120 acres) of primary rainforest were cleared, with efforts made to relocate the flora and fauna. The initial construction phase involves developing the primary road network, street lighting, electrical infrastructure, telecommunications systems, and landscaping. The contractor, Thong & Thong, began work on 7 May 2022, with an expected completion date of 6 May 2024. The $100 million project, spanning 310 hectares and budgeted at $33,976,353.19, is part of the 11th National Development Plan (RKN 11). It will include a sports complex, auditorium, administrative and academic buildings, a residential college, student center, canteen, and multipurpose hall.

== Notable people ==
=== Rectors ===
- 2007–2009: Pengiran Mohammad Abdul Rahman
- 2009–2010: Mohd. Yusop Damit
- 2010–2013: Serbini Matahir
- 2014–2026: Dato Norarfan Zainal
- 2026–present: Dr Awang Abdul Nasir Haji Abdul Rani
