= National Anthem of Kuwait =

al-Nashīd al-Waṭanī al-Kuwaytī
English: 'National Anthem of Kuwait'
- النشيد الوطني الكويتي
- National anthem of Kuwait
- Lyrics: Ahmad Meshari Al-Adwani
- Music: Ibrahim Al-Soula (arranged by Ahmad Ali)
- Adopted: February 25, 1978
- Preceded by: "Amiri Salute"

Audio sample
- U.S. Navy Band instrumental version (intro and chorus only) in B-flat major: file; help

The National Anthem of Kuwait (النشيد الوطني الكويتي) was written by poet Ahmad Meshari Al-Adwani with music composed by Ibrahim Al-Soula and arranged by Ahmad Ali. It was first broadcast on 25 February 1978. Prior to 1978, the "Amiri Salute" was used.

== History and use ==
Although the anthem was chosen during the reign of Sheikh Sabah Al-Salem Al-Sabah, it was not used in his era due to his death on 31 December 1977. As it was scheduled to start using the anthem on the day of the celebration of Kuwait’s National Day, and at that time the mourning period for the former Emir Sheikh Sabah Al-Salem Al-Sabah was completed.

The anthem is played every day at the beginning of the day in most Kuwaiti schools and on TV and radio stations.

== Lyrics ==
Arabic original

وَطَنِي الْكُوَيْتَ سَلِمْتَ لِلْمَجْدِ
وَعَلَىٰ جَبِينِكَ طَالِعُ السَّعْدِ

جوقة:
وَطَنِي الْكُوَيْتَ سَلِمْتَ لِلْمَجْدِ
وَعَلَىٰ جَبِينِكَ طَالِعُ السَّعْدِ
وَطَنِي الْكُوَيْت وَطَنِي الْكُوَيْت
وَطَنِي الْكُوَيْتَ سَلِمْتَ لِلْمَجْدِ

١
يَا مَهْدَ آبَاءِ الْأُولَىٰ كَتَبُواْ
سِفْرَ الْخُلُودِ فَنَادَتِ الشُّهُبُ
اَللّٰهُ أَكْبَرُ إِنَّهُمْ عَرَبُ
طَلَعَتْ كَوَاكِبُ جَنَّةِ الْخُلْدِ

جوقة

۲
بُورِكْتَ يَا وَطَنِي الْكُوَيْتَ لَنَا
سَكَنًا وَعِشْتَ عَلِى الْمَدَىٰ وَطَنًا
يَفْدِيْكَ حُرٌّ فِي حِمَاكَ بَنَىٰ
صَرْحَ الْحَيَاةِ بِأَكْرَمِ الْأَيْدِي

جوقة

٣
نَحْمِيكَ يَا وَطَنِي وَشَاهِدُنَا
شَرْعُ الْهُدَىٰ وَالْحَقُّ رَائِدُنَا
وَأَمِيرُنَا لِلْعِزِّ قَائِدُنَا
رَبُّ الْحَمِيَّةِ صَادِقُ الْوَعْدِ

جوقة

MSA Romanization

Waṭanī l-Kuwayta salimta li-l-majdi
Wa-ʿalā jabīnika ṭāliʿa s-saʿdi

Jawqa:
Waṭanī l-Kuwayta salimta li-l-majdi
Wa-ʿalā jabīnika ṭāliʿa s-saʿdi
Waṭanī l-Kuwayt waṭanī l-Kuwayt
Waṭanī l-Kuwayta salimta li-l-majdi

I
Yā mahda ʾābāʾi l-ʾūlā katabū
Sifr al-xulūdi fa-nādat iš-šuhubu
Allāhu ʾakbaru ʾinnahum ʿArabu
Ṭalaʿat Kawākibu jannati l-xuldi

Jawqa

II
Būrikta yā waṭanī l-Kuwayta lanā
Sakanan wa-ʿišta ʿalī l-mada waṭanan
Yafdīka ḥurrun fī ḥimāka banā
Ṣarḥa l-ḥayati bi-ʾakrami l-ʾaydī

Jawqa

III
Naḥmīka yā waṭanī wa-šāhidunā
Šarʿu l-huda wa-l-ḥaqqu rāʾidunā
Wa-ʾAmīrunā li-l-ʿizzi qāʾidunā
Rabbu l-ḥamiyati ṣādiqu l-waʿdi

Jawqa

IPA transcription (Note: See Help:IPA/Arabic and Kuwaiti Arabic § Phonology.)

[wɑ.tˁɑ.nɪː‿l.ku.wæj.tæ sæ.lɪm.tæ lɪ‿l.mæd͡ʒ.di]
[wɑ ʕɑ.læː d͡ʒæ.biː.ni.kæ tˁɑː.lɪ.ʕɑ‿s.sɑʕ.di]

[d͡ʒɑw.qɑ]
[wɑ.tˁɑ.nɪː‿l.ku.wæj.tæ sæ.lɪm.tæ lɪ‿l.mæd͡ʒ.di]
[wɑ ʕɑ.læː d͡ʒæ.biː.ni.kæ tˁɑː.lɪ.ʕɑ‿s.sɑʕ.di]
[wɑ.tˁɑ.nɪː‿l.ku.wæjt wɑ.tˁɑ.nɪː‿l.ku.wæjt]
[wɑ.tˁɑ.nɪː‿l.ku.wæj.tæ sæ.lɪm.tæ lɪ‿l.mæd͡ʒ.di]

I
[jæː mæh.dæ ʔæː.bæː.ʔɪ‿l.ʔuː.læː kæ.tæ.buː]
[sɪfr æl.xʊ.luː.di fæ.næː.dæt ɪʃ.ʃu.hu.bu]
[ɑɫ.ɫɑː.hu ʔæk.bɑ.ru ʔɪn.næ.hʊm ʕɑ.rɑ.bu]
[tˁɑ.lɑ.ʕɑt kæ.wæː.ki.bu d͡ʒæn.næ.tɪ‿l.xʊl.di]

[d͡ʒɑw.qɑ]

II
[buː.rɪk.tæ jæː wɑ.tˁɑ.nɪː‿l.ku.wæj.tæ læ.næː]
[sæ.kæ.næn wɑ ʕɪʃ.tɑ ʕɑ.lɪː‿l.mæ.dæ wɑ.tˁɑ.næn]
[jæf.diː.kæ ħʊr.rʊn fiː ħɪ.mæː.kæ bæ.næː]
[sˁɑr.hɑ‿l.ħɑ.jæ.ti bi.ʔæk.rɑ.mɪ‿l.ʔæj.diː]

[d͡ʒɑw.qɑ]

III
[nɑħ.miː.kæ jæː wɑ.tˁɑ.niː wæ ʃæː.hi.du.næː]
[ʃɑr.ʕʊ‿l.hʊ.dæ wæ‿l.ħɑq.qʊ rɑː.ʔi.du.næː]
[wæ ʔæ.miː.rʊ.næː lɪ‿l.ʕɪz.zɪ qɑː.ʔi.du.næː]
[rɑb.bʊ‿l.ħɑ.mi.jæ.tɪ sˁɑː.dɪ.qʊ‿l.wɑʕ.di]

[d͡ʒɑw.qɑ]

Literal English translation

My homeland Kuwait, you have prospered to glory,
And on your forehead is an omen of fortune.

Chorus:
My homeland Kuwait, you have prospered to glory,
And on your forehead is an omen of fortune.
My homeland Kuwait, my homeland Kuwait,
My homeland Kuwait, you have prospered to glory.

I
Oh cradle of forefathers, they wrote
A book of eternity, then the meteors called
God is the greatest, indeed Arabs
Ascended as the planets of paradise of perpetuity.

Chorus

II
Blessed be my homeland Kuwait, for us
It was peaceful, and you lived on the extent of the homeland
Kept free in your protection to build
A palace of life with the most generous arms.

Chorus

III
Let us protect, oh my homeland, and we witnessed
The revealing of the guidance and the truth, our pioneer,
And our Amir is the powerful, our leader,
The master of my protection, the truthful of the promise.

Chorus
