= Manshiet el Bakry Hospital =

Coordinates: 30.091631°N 31.306502°E

Mansheyet El Bakri Hospital near the Heliopolis district of Cairo, is a community hospital with a staff of 400 full and part-time doctors. After the resignation of President Hosni Mubarak on Feb. 11, 2011, workers at the hospital formed an independent trade union open to doctors, nurses, clerks and all other hospital personnel. They voted out the old hospital management and elected Dr. Milad Ismail as head administrator.

== Conditions at hospital ==
Workers expressed anger over a number of issues, including the lack of police protection at the hospital and a severe shortage of supplies. Doctors had to ask patients to buy their own drugs and medical supplies at pharmacies because so little of the national health budget reached the local hospitals.

Workers at Manshiet el Bakry participated in three national doctors’ strikes in May 2011. The doctors’ professional association (syndicate) demanded increased pay for doctors and nurses, sharp increases in for hospital budgets and the resignation of the national Health Minister. An estimated 80% of Egypt’s doctors participated in the strikes, according to the Daily News Egypt.

Samar Ahmed, an emergency room doctor, told Ahram Online that doctors’ wages were so low, they sometimes worked four jobs just to survive. “But then we are so exhausted, we are only working with half energy and half concentration,” Ahmed said. “I mean, does it make sense that a doctor earns 100 Egyptian Pounds (US $15) and an accountant gets 5000 Egyptian Pounds (US $833)?”

== Workers vote out old management ==
Doctors complained that the Mubarak regime had cut back the health budget while pouring money and resources into the Ministry of Interior. “The government allocates 3.6 percent of the national budget for health care, while the repressive Ministry of Interior funds an armed force of 1.4 million police,” according to veteran reporter Reese Erlich.

Doctors and staff at Manshiet el Bakry continue to administer their hospital independent from national Ministry of Health control. Dr. Milad Ismail has found new, interim funding through outside donations. “We now depend on donations from civil society, NGOs, from doctors at the hospital,” he said. “We also rely on the spirit of the workers.” Some hospital profits will now be used to hire private security guards to protect the doctors and staff. Dr. Ismail says the battle will continue to get adequate funding from the Ministry of Health.
