= Resolution of Sarajevo Muslims =

The Resolution of Sarajevo Muslims or Muslim Resolution of 1941 (Serbo-Croatian: Sarajevska rezolucija/Сарајевска резолуција) was one of the Resolutions of Muslims from Bosnia and Herzegovina (then parts of the Independent State of Croatia) declared by 108 notable Muslim citizens of Sarajevo during the Second World War in Sarajevo on October 12, 1941.

The resolution was prompted by the genocide of Serbs organized by Ustaše wearing "the fez as a Muslim symbol" and by the consequent response of Serb Chetniks who persecuted Muslims believing they were responsible for the crimes of Ustaše. The text of this resolution was based on the resolution of the assembly of el-Hidaje (an association of ulama from Bosnia and Herzegovina) held on August 14, 1941.

By signing the resolution, notable Muslims from Sarajevo condemned the persecution of Serbs, distanced themselves from the Muslims who participated in such atrocities and protested against attempts to blame the entire Bosnian Muslim population for the crimes of the Ustaše. Additionally, they requested that the government of the Independent State of Croatia provide security for all the puppet state's subjects regardless of their identity, to punish those who were responsible for the atrocities and to help those who suffered during them. The authors of the resolution were Mehmed Handžić and Kasim Dobrača.

== Background ==
In the Second World War, the territory of modern Bosnia and Herzegovina became part of the Independent State of Croatia. An organized persecution of Serbs, of the Jews and of the Romani people took place on the whole territory of Independent State of Croatia (including Bosnia and Herzegovina) soon after it was established. Ustaše wanted to cause conflicts between Muslims and Orthodox Serbs in Bosnia and Herzegovina. Therefore, they recruited some members of Muslim population of Bosnia and Herzegovina to participate in the persecution of Serbs. They wore Muslim clothes and shouted Muslim names when they organized attacks on Serb population. Such activities resulted with armed conflicts between Serbs and Muslims. That was the reason why Muslims from many towns of Bosnia and Herzegovina declared their resolutions. Most notable are the resolutions of Muslims from Prijedor (September 23, 1941), Sarajevo (October 12, 1941), Mostar (October 21, 1941), Banja Luka (November 12, 1941), Bijeljina (December 2, 1941), Tuzla (December 11, 1941) and Zenica (May 26, 1942).

== The resolution ==
The basis for the Resolution of Sarajevo Muslims was a resolution declared by El-Hidaje, an association of ulama from Bosnia and Herzegovina on its assembly held on August 14, 1941. It was written by Mehmed Handžić and Kasim Dobrača. All Muslim resolutions of 1941, including the Resolution of Sarajevo Muslims, contain the following elements:

- public condemning of the persecutions of the Serbs by Ustaše
- distancing from the Muslims who participated in such persecutions and protesting against the attempts to blame the whole Muslim population for the crimes of Ustaša
- presenting information about the persecutions of Muslims
- demanding assistance for victims of all religions

The conclusion of the Resolution of Sarajevo Muslims included request for providing the security for all citizens of the country, regardless of their identity, punishing the individuals responsible for the committed atrocities and helping the people who suffered during disorder.

The resolution was officially delivered to Jozo Dumandžić when he visited Sarajevo as minister in the government of Independent State of Croatia. By the order of Ante Pavelić, Dumandžić unsuccessfully attempted to force the signatories of the resolution to recall their signatures. Džafer Kulenović has also been ordered by Pavelić to force the signatories of the resolution to recall their signatures, but he failed too.

== Aftermath ==
Muslims who signed the resolution were exposed to explicit threats of the Ustaša regime. Jure Francetić, a World War II Ustaše Commissioner of Bosnia and Herzegovina, threatened to send all signatories to the Nazi concentration camps.

After the Resolution of Sarajevo Muslims had been signed, Muslims from many other towns in Bosnia and Herzegovina signed similar resolutions in following months. On December 1, 1941, Muslims from Sarajevo submitted another protest against actions of Ustaše "under the fez as a Muslim symbol". Some conservative Muslims realized that their resolutions did not have any effect on Ustasha regime, so they gave up hopes that such regime would protect interest of the Muslims. In August 1942 they established the Committee for National Salvation and sent a petition to Hitler asking for "a region of Bosnia" under direct German patronage, supporting their request with the racial arguments. They also asked Hitler to provide weapons for a Bosnian guard as nucleus of the army of "region of Bosnia" and that request pleased Heinrich Himmler and group of SS officers who already had plans to establish separate SS-Division composed of Muslims. That plan was implemented in 1943 when the 13th Waffen Mountain Division of the SS Handschar (1st Croatian) was established.

== Analysis ==
Robert J. Donia writes that the resolution aimed to avoid assigning any direct blame to any person or group. Yugoslav socialist-era historians said that Muslim signatories criticized atrocities without attacking Ustaša's intention to exterminate groups of people. The resolution called on the authorities to establish order and avoid further violence.
