= Mehmed Handžić =

Bosnian scholar, theologian and politician (1906–1944)

Effendi Mehmed Handžić
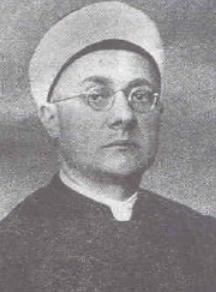

Personal life
- Born: 16 December 1906 Sarajevo, Austria-Hungary
- Died: 29 July 1944 (aged 37) Sarajevo, Independent State of Croatia
- Region: Bosnia
- Education: Al-Azhar University (1931)

Religious life
- Religion: Islam
- Denomination: Sunni
- Founder of: El-Hidaje

Mehmed ef. Handžić (16 December 1906 – 29 July 1944) was a Bosnian scholar, cleric and politician. He was the leader of the Islamic revivalist movement in Bosnia and the founder of the religious association El-Hidaje. Handžić was one of the authors of the Resolution of Sarajevo Muslims and the chairman of the Committee of National Salvation.

He was born in Sarajevo, where he completed his primary and secondary education. He subsequently enrolled in the Al-Azhar University in Egypt, where he authored his first works. After graduating from Al-Azhar, he returned to Bosnia, where he became a professor and later a director of the Gazi Husrev-beg madrasa. In 1936, he co-founded the association El-Hidaje, which gathered intellectuals of the revivalist current. He later became the editor-in-chief of its newspaper and president of the association in 1939.

Handžić's political career began with his candidacy in the 1938 Yugoslav parliamentary election. A year later, he participated in the creation of the Movement for the Autonomy of Bosnia and Herzegovina, and became part of its leadership. When the Axis powers invaded Yugoslavia in April 1941, they established a puppet state called the Independent State of Croatia, to which Handžić pledged allegiance. He withdrew his support several months later and initiated the adoption of the Resolution of Sarajevo Muslims condemning the war crimes committed by the Independent State of Croatia. Handžić later became the chairman of the Council of National Salvation, which was created to organize defense and aid for Muslims of Bosnia. He died on 29 July 1944 during a routine medical operation at the Koševo hospital.

== Early life and education ==
Mehmed Handžić was born in 1906 in Sarajevo, to a prominent Bosniak family. He received his primary education in his family and in a local kuttab. He then graduated from a ruşdiye school and Sharia Grammar School in Sarajevo. The Society of Gajret awarded him a scholarship towards medical studies for finishing Sharia Grammar School as the best student of his year. However, in 1926, he opted to enroll in Al-Azhar University in Egypt where he was regarded as one of the best students and often called a shaykh; many professors in the university sought Handžić's opinions on certain matters. Handžić distinguished himself in the field of research on Hadith and Islamic tradition. He authored Al Jewhar al asna fi tarajim 'ulama' wa shu'ra' al-Bosna in Arabic while at the university; this work was printed in several editions and it was translated to Bosnian by professor Mehmed Kico. The work covered the intellectual achievements of Bosnians in history. While at Al-Azhar, Handžić was in contact with Muslim Brotherhood or Young Muslims; this caused him to develop a more political view of Islam than most of the Bosnian ulama. He completed his degree in Islamic law in 1931; afterwards he performed the Hajj and then returned to Bosnia.

== Academic career ==
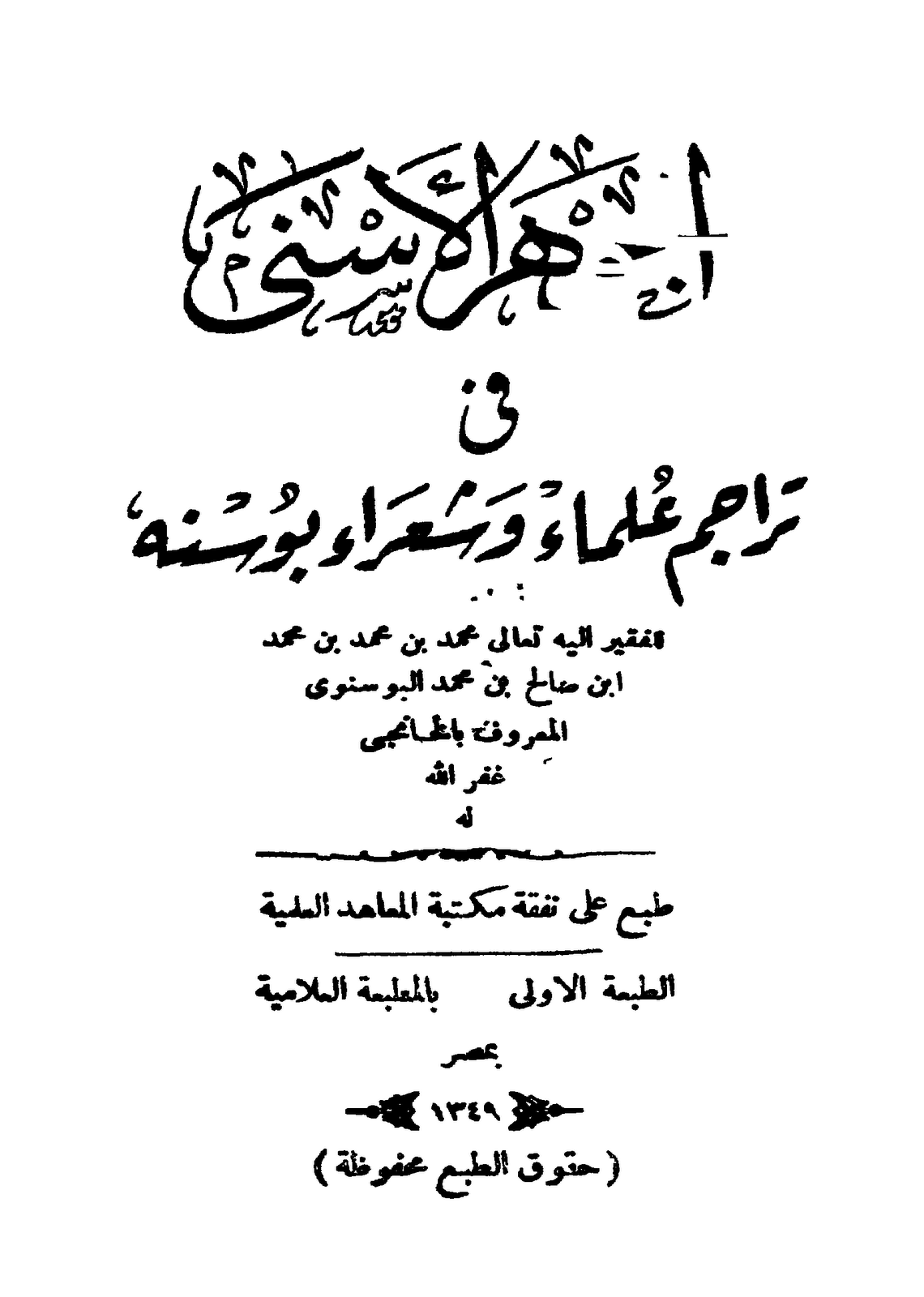
Cover of Al Jewhar al asna fi tarajim 'ulama' wa shu'ra' al-Bosna, a work in Arabic Handžić authored while studying in Cairo

Handžić became a professor at the Gazi Husrev-beg madrasa and, in 1932, became its director. There he taught the Arabic language and the subjects of tafsir, hadith and fiqh. He also worked with several Islamic newspapers and he engaged other fields of work in Islamic associations in Bosnia. In 1931 or 1932, he initiated the reopening of a khanqah in Bentbaša. He was elected to committee of a Muslim charity organization called Merhamet in 1933. A year later, he wrote a booklet entitled Vasijjetnama (English: Will) and donated all of the income from that work to Merhamet. In 1937, Handžić became Head Librarian of the Gazi Husrev-beg Library. While serving in this position, he created a new library catalog and examined 3,240 manuscripts. In 1939, he became a professor at the Higher Islamic Shari 'a-Theological School where he taught fiqh and tasfir.

Handžić was the leader of an Islamic revivalist movement in Bosnia, which sought to return to what it viewed as traditional Islam, in opposition to a freely-interpreted Quran or easy acceptance of European modernity. On 8 March 1936, Handžić, together with his associates, founded the association El-Hidaje (The Right Path), which gathered religious scholars, müderris, aʼimmah and other intellectuals of the revivalist current. The association also founded a newspaper, also called El-Hidaje, in December 1936; Handžić became editor-in-chief in August 1937. Handžić became President of El-Hidaje in 1939. Under his leadership, El-Hidaje grew from an organization representing the 'ilmiyya (body of Ulama) to becoming the leading organization of the revivalist movement meant to encompass all Muslims of Bosnia.

=== Written work ===
Most of Handžić's works are about Islamic tradition and ethics. In the late 1930s, Handžić wrote several short Qur'anic commentaries in Arabic. In 1941, he wrote a textbook titled An Introduction to the Science of Tafsīr. (Note: Bosnian: Uvod u tefsirsku nauku) At religious high schools in Bosnia, this work is still used as the main textbook for tafsir subjects.

== Political career ==
Handžić's political career began when he was a candidate on the Muslim Organization (Bosnian Muslim branch of the Croatian Peasant Party) electoral list which was part of an opposition coalition led by the Croatian Peasant Party in 1938 parliamentary election. Handžić later participated in several meetings of major Bosnian cultural and religious organizations which led to the creation of the Movement for the Autonomy of Bosnia and Herzegovina (Note: Bosnian: Pokret za autonomiju Bosne i Hercegovine) on 30 December 1939. He became part of its leadership as a representative of El-Hidaje.

In April 1941, when Axis powers invaded Yugoslavia, the Independent State of Croatia (an Ustaše-led Axis puppet state) was established to which Muslim political and religious elites gave their allegiance. This included Handžić, who together with Kasim Dobrača, pledged allegiance to Poglavnik Ante Pavelić in May 1941 on the behalf of El-Hidaje.

However, this support was withdrawn on 28 August, when during an El-Hidaje assembly Handžić initiated the adoption of a resolution condemning Ustaše war crimes and the expulsion of Serbs, Jews, Romani and other people from Bosnia and Herzegovina. On 12 October, this resolution was declared publicly with the support of 108 notable Sarajevo Muslims.

On 26 August 1942, a conference of around 300 Muslim notables presided by Reis-ul-Ulema (Note: The most senior religious figure of Muslim Bosnians) Salih Safvet Bašić was held in the offices of the Muslim charity Merhamet in Sarajevo. The conference was held in response to the massacres of Bosniaks by Chetniks in Foča. It criticized the failure of the Independent State of Croatia to protect Muslim civilians and set goals of organizing aid Muslims in eastern Bosnia and creating an armed force to defend Muslims. To achieve these goals, the Council of National Salvation (Note: Bosnian: Odbor narodnog spasa Marko Attila Hoare translates this as "Council of National Salvation" while Xavier Bougarel translates it as "People's Salvation Committee".) was founded during this conference with Handžić as its chairman.

Handžić accused the Nazi-puppet Ustaša regime of murdering Muslims, and asked Germany to intervene. To that end, he met with German embassy officials in Sarajevo in mid-April 1943. During this meeting, he claimed that the Muslims in the Ustaša government were not representative of the Muslim community but had been "bought". He accused both Ustaša regime of Croatia and Kingdom of Yugoslavia of adopting "a policy of annihilation" towards Muslims. He welcomed the formation of the Muslim SS Division and further called for an independent Muslim state under German protection. While other Muslim politicians made their appeals for an alliance openly, Handžić did this behind closed doors. During the same month, Handžić welcomed the Grand Mufti of Jerusalem, Amin al-Husseini at a banquet in the Sarajevo city hall. The mufti came to Bosnia in order to organize recruitment to the Muslim SS Division.

Elswehere in 1943, Muslims in Bosnia had begun joining the anti-Nazi Yugoslav Partisans; in turn, the Partisans began protecting Muslims from Chetniks. By autumn, Muhamed Pandža decided to create a Muslim guerilla force that would fight alongside the Partisans; this decision was supported by Handžić and other Muslim notables.

=== Political views ===
Handžić strongly opposed the secularisation which had begun to appear in Bosnia after World War I. He denounced mixed marriages (marriages between a Muslim and a non-Muslim) and urged Muslims to not attend non-Muslim weddings or funerals. He also emphasized the importance of Muslims wearing visible signs of their religion. Handžić strongly opposed the westernization of Bosnia, calling it "materialistic", and condemned pre-marital sex and consumption of alcohol. He saw Western Europe as anti-Muslim, writing that many European newspapers applauded the massacres of Muslims in Rumelia.

Handžić considered Islam to be a foundational element of Bosnian Muslims' cultural identity and he believed in the compatibility of Islam with nationalism. Handžić's work Patriotism, nationality and nationalism from the Islamic point of view, (Note: Bosnian: Patriotizam, narodnost i nacionalizam sa islamskog gledišta) published by El-Hidaje in 1941, created a basic contour of Bosniak nationalism. He also introduced the concept of Bosniakhood, which applied only to Bosnian Muslim community. Handžić also had pan-Islamic leanings.

== Death and legacy ==
Mehmed Handžić died during a routine medical operation in Koševo Hospital on 29 July 1944, at the young age of 37. He never married and had no children. It has been alleged that the death was a result of an assassination by the Partisans; historian Marko Attila Hoare describes the theory as "not impossible".

Contemporary scholar Hazim Šabanović described Handžić as one "of the greatest Islamic scholars Bosnia has had in last five centuries". Handžić's bibliography amounted to 300 books and numerous articles, treatises, essays, brochures and textbooks both on Bosnian and Arabic. Some of his textbooks are still the main literature for students at the Faculty of Islamic Studies at the University of Sarajevo.
