= Karbalayi Mehdi Gardeh =

Karbalayi Mehdi Gardeh كربلايی مهدی گرده
- Neighbourhood
- Interactive map of Karbalayi Mehdi Gardeh
- Coordinates: 37.45°N 49.438°E
- Country: Iran
- Province: Gilan
- County: Bandar-e Anzali
- Bakhsh: Central
- City: Bandar-e Anzali

Population (2006)
  - Total: 66
- Time zone: UTC+3:30 (IRST)

Karbalayi Mehdi Gardeh (Persian: کربلایی مهدی گرده, also Romanized as Karbalāyī Mehdī Gardeh) is a neighborhood in the city of Bandar-e Anzali, in Gilan Province, Iran.

Formerly, it was a village in Chahar Farizeh Rural District, in the Central District of Bandar-e Anzali County. It is south of the city center and north of Anzali Lagoon. At the 2006 census, its population was 66, in 16 families.
