= Shanghai Pardeh =

Village in Gilan province, Iran

Shanghai Pardeh Persian: شانگهای پرده
- Village
- Location within Iran
- Coordinates: 37°27′03″N 49°32′47″E
- Country: Iran
- Province: Gilan
- County: Bandar-e Anzali
- District: Central
- Rural District: Licharaki-ye Hasan Rud

Population (2016)
  - Total: 366
- Time zone: UTC+3:30 (IRST)

Shanghai Pardeh (Persian: شانگهای پرده) (Note: Also romanized as Shānghāī Pardeh) is a village in Licharaki-ye Hasan Rud Rural District (Note: Also known as Licharegi-ye Hasan Rud Rural District) of the Central District in Bandar-e Anzali County, (Note: Formerly Bandar-e Pahlavi County) Gilan province, Iran.

It borders the city of Bandar-e Anzali to the north, Talebabad village to the east and northeast, and Torbehgudeh village to the west.

== Demographics ==
=== Population ===
At the time of the 2006 National Census, the village's population was 230 in 71 households. The following census in 2011 counted 346 people in 113 households. The 2016 census measured the population of the village as 366 people in 122 households.
