= Licharaki-ye Hasan Rud =

Village in Gilan province, Iran

Licharaki-ye Hasan Rud Persian: ليچارکي حسن رود
- Village
- Location within Iran
- Country: Iran
- Province: Gilan
- County: Bandar-e Anzali
- District: Central
- Rural District: Licharaki-ye Hasan Rud

Population (2016)
  - Total: 2,003
- Time zone: UTC+3:30 (IRST)

Licharaki-ye Hasan Rud (Persian: ليچارکي حسن رود) (Note: Also romanized as Līchārakī-ye Ḩasan Rūd; also known as Lejārekī, Licharaki, Licharegi-ye Hasan Rud (لیچارگی حسن رود), also romanized as Līchāregī-ye Ḩasan Rūd; Lidzhariki, Lījār Key, Lījārakī, Lījārakī-ye Ḩasan Rūd (ليجاركي حسن رود), Lījārekī, Lijariki, Lijariki-ye Hasan Rud, and Līzharīkī) is a village in, and the capital of, Licharaki-ye Hasan Rud Rural District (Note: Also known as Licharegi-ye Hasan Rud Rural District) in the Central District of Bandar-e Anzali County, (Note: Formerly Bandar-e Pahlavi County) Gilan province, Iran.

== Demographics ==
=== Population ===
At the time of the 2006 National Census, the village's population was 1,950 in 556 households. The following census in 2011 counted 2,326 people in 657 households. The 2016 census measured the population of the village as 2,003 people in 634 households.
