= Kargan, Gilan =

Village in Gilan province, Iran

Kargan Persian: كرگان
- Village
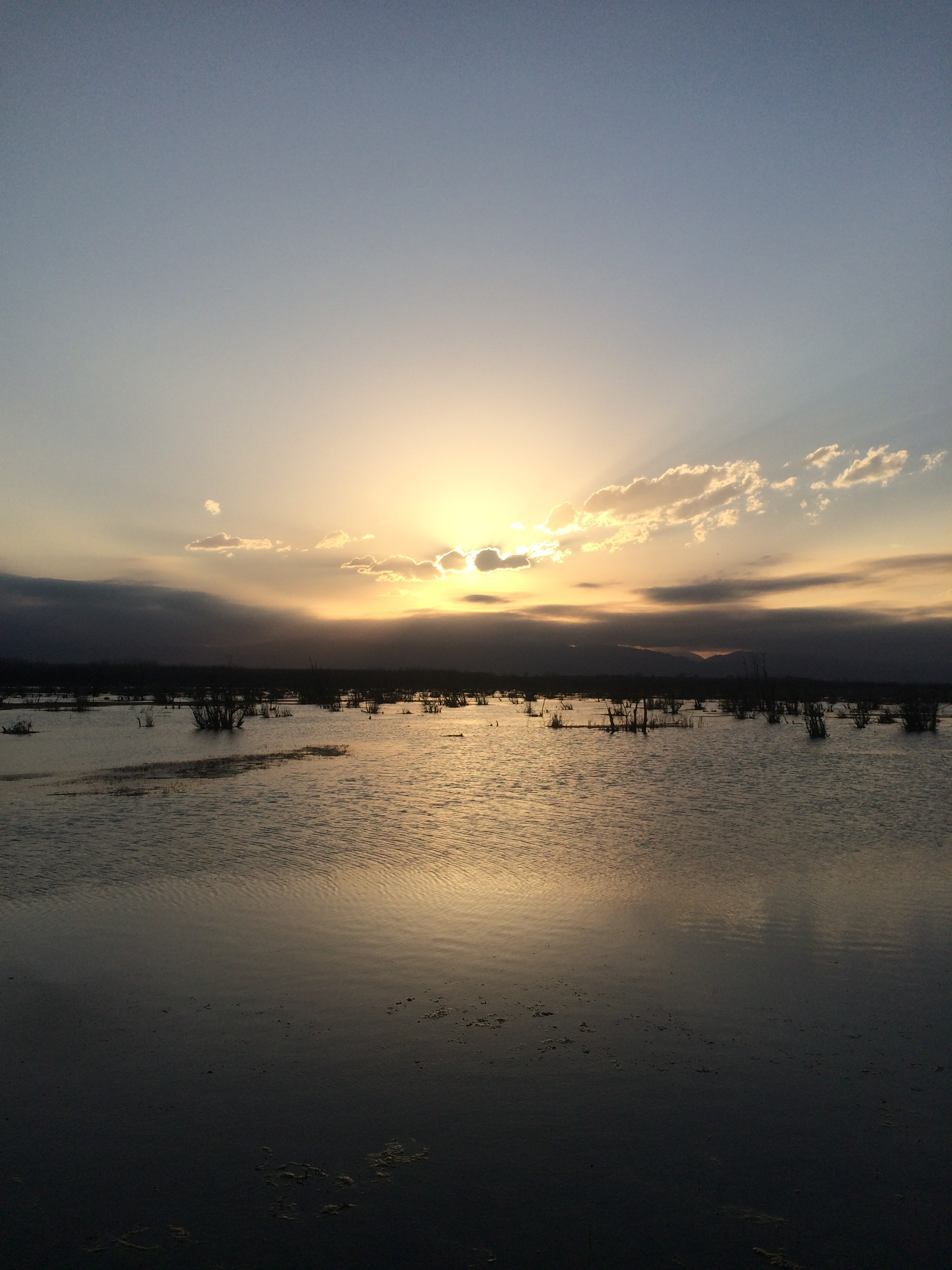
- The village of Kargan

- Location within Iran
- Coordinates: 37°30′31″N 49°14′37″E
- Country: Iran
- Province: Gilan
- County: Bandar-e Anzali
- District: Central
- Rural District: Chahar Farizeh

Government
  - Dehyar: Amir Lotfi karkan

Population (2016)
  - Total: 456
- Time zone: UTC+3:30 (IRST)

Kargan (Persian: كرگان) (Note: Also romanized as Kargān) is a village in Chahar Farizeh Rural District of the Central District in Bandar-e Anzali County, (Note: Formerly Bandar-e Pahlavi County) Gilan province, Iran.

== Demographics ==
=== Population ===
At the time of the 2006 National Census, the village's population was 560 in 159 households. The following census in 2011 counted 526 people in 173 households. The 2016 census measured the population of the village as 456 people in 162 households.
