= Torbeh Bar =

Torbeh Bar تربه بر
- Village
- Location within Iran
- Coordinates: 37°28′12″N 49°18′31″E
- Country: Iran
- Province: Gilan
- County: Bandar-e Anzali
- Bakhsh: Central
- Rural District: Chahar Farizeh

Population (2006)
  - Total: 329
- Time zone: UTC+3:30 (IRST)

Torbeh Bar (Persian: تربه بر; also known as Torba Bera, Turbabar, Tūrbāvar, and Turbāwar) is a village in Chahar Farizeh Rural District, in the Central District of Bandar-e Anzali County, Gilan Province, Iran. At the 2016 census, its population was 177, in 75 families. Decreased from 329 people in 2006.
