= Rud Posht, Bandar-e Anzali =

Village in Gilan province, Iran

Rud Posht Persian: رودپشت
- Village
- Location within Iran
- Coordinates: 37°33′36″N 49°12′01″E
- Country: Iran
- Province: Gilan
- County: Bandar-e Anzali
- District: Central
- Rural District: Chahar Farizeh

Population (2016)
  - Total: 343
- Time zone: UTC+3:30 (IRST)

Rud Posht (Persian: رودپشت) (Note: Also romanized as Rūd Posht; also known as Rūd Posht-e Bālā, Rūd Posht-e Pā’īn, and Rud-Pusht) is a village in Chahar Farizeh Rural District of the Central District in Bandar-e Anzali County, (Note: Formerly Bandar-e Pahlavi County) Gilan province, Iran.

== Demographics ==
=== Population ===
At the time of the 2006 National Census, the village's population was 396 in 115 households. The following census in 2011 counted 373 people in 115 households. The 2016 census measured the population of the village as 343 people in 113 households.
