= Kuchek Mahalleh =

Village in Gilan province, Iran

Kuchek Mahalleh Persian: كوچک محله
- Village
- Location within Iran
- Coordinates: 37°32′04″N 49°16′04″E
- Country: Iran
- Province: Gilan
- County: Bandar-e Anzali
- District: Central
- Rural District: Chahar Farizeh

Population (2016)
  - Total: 328
- Time zone: UTC+3:30 (IRST)

Kuchek Mahalleh (Persian: كوچک محله) (Note: Also romanized as Kūchek Maḩalleh; also known as Bālā Maḩalleh Sangāchīn and Bālā Maḩalleh Sangarchīn) is a village in Chahar Farizeh Rural District of the Central District in Bandar-e Anzali County, (Note: Formerly Bandar-e Pahlavi County) Gilan province, Iran.

== Demographics ==
=== Population ===
At the time of the 2006 National Census, the village's population was 362 in 97 households. The following census in 2011 counted 350 people in 102 households. The 2016 census measured the population of the village as 328 people in 112 households.
