= Abkenar, Gilan =

Village in Gilan province, Iran

Abkenar Persian: آبکنار
- Village
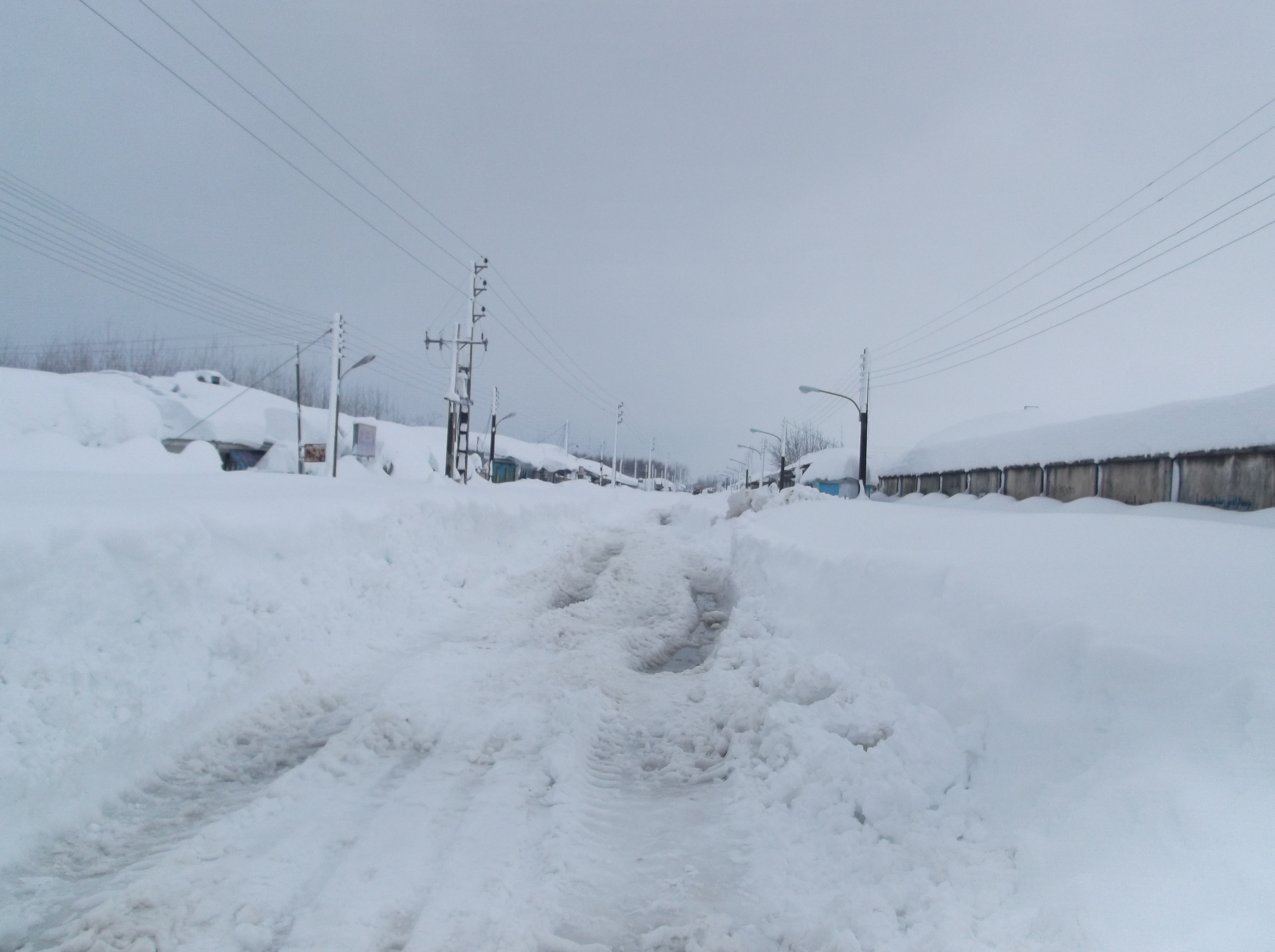
- The village of Abkenar in winter

- Location within Iran
- Coordinates: 37°27′35″N 49°19′53″E
- Country: Iran
- Province: Gilan
- County: Bandar-e Anzali
- District: Central
- Rural District: Chahar Farizeh

Government
  - Dehyar: Amir Lotfi karkan

Population (2016)
  - Total: 1,926
- Time zone: UTC+3:30 (IRST)

Abkenar (Persian: آبکنار) (Note: Also romanized as Ābkenār; also known as Āb-i-Kinār and Ab-kinar) is a village in Chahar Farizeh Rural District of the Central District in Bandar-e Anzali County, (Note: Formerly Bandar-e Pahlavi County) Gilan province, Iran.

== Demographics ==
=== Population ===
At the time of the 2006 National Census, the village's population was 2,970 in 979 households. The following census in 2011 counted 2,448 people in 943 households. The 2016 census measured the population of the village as 1,926 people in 812 households.
