= Kapurchal, Gilan =

Village in Gilan province, Iran

Kapurchal Persian: كپورچال
- Village
- Location within Iran
- Coordinates: 37°32′56″N 49°14′03″E
- Country: Iran
- Province: Gilan
- County: Bandar-e Anzali
- District: Central
- Rural District: Chahar Farizeh

Population (2016)
  - Total: 1,542
- Time zone: UTC+3:30 (IRST)

Kapurchal (Persian: كپورچال) (Note: Also romanized as Kapūr Chāl, Kapūrchāl, and Kopūr Chāl; also known as Bāzār Kopūr Chāl and Kavarchal) is a village in, and the capital of, Chahar Farizeh Rural District in the Central District of Bandar-e Anzali County, (Note: Formerly Bandar-e Pahlavi County) Gilan province, Iran.

== Demographics ==
=== Population ===
At the time of the 2006 National Census, the village's population was 1,838 in 561 households. The following census in 2011 counted 1,735 people in 574 households. The 2016 census measured the population of the village as 1,542 people in 544 households.
