= Bashman =

Village in Gilan province, Iran

Bashman Persian: بشمن
- Village
- Location within Iran
- Coordinates: 37°29′16″N 49°22′46″E
- Country: Iran
- Province: Gilan
- County: Bandar-e Anzali
- District: Central
- Rural District: Chahar Farizeh

Population (2016)
  - Total: 2,320
- Time zone: UTC+3:30 (IRST)

Bashman (Persian: بشمن) (Note: Also known as Bashan, Bashm, and Beshm) is a village in Chahar Farizeh Rural District of the Central District in Bandar-e Anzali County, (Note: Formerly Bandar-e Pahlavi County) Gilan province, Iran.

== Demographics ==
=== Population ===
At the time of the 2006 National Census, the village's population was 1,405 in 416 households. The following census in 2011 counted 1,780 people in 567 households. The 2016 census measured the population of the village as 2,320 people in 756 households. It was the most populous village in its rural district.
