= Hasan Rud =

Village in Gilan province, Iran

Hasan Rud Persian: حسن رود
- Village
- Location within Iran
- Coordinates: 37°27′18″N 49°36′59″E
- Country: Iran
- Province: Gilan
- County: Bandar-e Anzali
- District: Central
- Rural District: Licharaki-ye Hasan Rud

Population (2016)
  - Total: 1,466
- Time zone: UTC+3:30 (IRST)

Hasan Rud (Persian: حسن رود) (Note: Also romanized as Ḩasan Rūd; also known as Khasanrud) is a village in Licharaki-ye Hasan Rud Rural District (Note: Also known as Licharegi-ye Hasan Rud Rural District) of the Central District in Bandar-e Anzali County, (Note: Formerly Bandar-e Pahlavi County) Gilan province, Iran.

== Demographics ==
=== Population ===
At the time of the 2006 National Census, the village's population was 1,266 in 391 households. The following census in 2011 counted 1,439 people in 468 households. The 2016 census measured the population of the village as 1,466 people in 506 households.
