= Sangachin =

Village in Gilan province, Iran

Sangachin Persian: سنگاچين
- Village
- Location within Iran
- Coordinates: 37°31′02″N 49°18′35″E
- Country: Iran
- Province: Gilan
- County: Bandar-e Anzali
- District: Central
- Rural District: Chahar Farizeh

Population (2016)
  - Total: 2,305
- Time zone: UTC+3:30 (IRST)

Sangachin (Persian: سنگاچين) (Note: Also romanized as Sangāchīn; also known as Sangar Chīn, Sangarchīn, and Sankāchīn) is a village in Chahar Farizeh Rural District of the Central District in Bandar-e Anzali County, (Note: Formerly Bandar-e Pahlavi County) Gilan province, Iran.

== Demographics ==
=== Population ===
At the time of the 2006 National Census, the village's population was 2,421 in 708 households. The following census in 2011 counted 2,321 people in 731 households. The 2016 census measured the population of the village as 2,305 people in 800 households.
