= Oshtarkan =

Oshtarkan اُشْتَرکان
- Village
- Location within Iran
- Coordinates: 37°30′22″N 49°13′57″E
- Country: Iran
- Province: Gilan
- County: Bandar-e Anzali
- Bakhsh: Central
- Rural District: Chahar Farizeh

Population (2006)
  - Total: 56
- Time zone: UTC+3:30 (IRST)

Oshtarkan (Persian: اُشْتَرکان, also Romanized as Oshtarkān) is a village in Chahar Farizeh Rural District, in the Central District of Bandar-e Anzali County, Gilan Province, Iran. At the 2016 census, its population was 46, in 16 families. Down from 56 in 2006.
