= Chay Bijar =

Chay Bijar چاي بيجار
- Village
- Location within Iran
- Coordinates: 37°33′09″N 49°13′13″E
- Country: Iran
- Province: Gilan
- County: Bandar-e Anzali
- Bakhsh: Central
- Rural District: Chahar Farizeh

Population (2006)
  - Total: 86
- Time zone: UTC+3:30 (IRST)

Chay Bijar (Persian: چاي بيجار, also Romanized as Chāy Bījār; also known as Bāzār, Chāh Bījā, Chāh Bījār, Chāy Bejār, and Chay-Bidzhar) is a village in Chahar Farizeh Rural District, in the Central District of Bandar-e Anzali County, Gilan Province, Iran. At the 2016 census, its population was 68, in 27 families. Down from 86 people in 2006.
