= Shileh Sar =

Shileh Sar شيله سر
- Village
- Location within Iran
- Coordinates: 37°31′24″N 49°13′25″E
- Country: Iran
- Province: Gilan
- County: Bandar-e Anzali
- Bakhsh: Central
- Rural District: Chahar Farizeh

Population (2006)
  - Total: 354
- Time zone: UTC+3:30 (IRST)

Shileh Sar (Persian: شيله سر, also Romanized as Shīleh Sar; also known as Shīl-e Sar, Shil-i-Sar, and Shīl Sar) is a village in Chahar Farizeh Rural District, in the Central District of Bandar-e Anzali County, Gilan Province, Iran. At the 2016 census, its population was 249, in 100 families. Down from 354 people in 2006.
