= Moaf =

Moaf or Maaf (Persian: معاف) may refer to:

== Places ==
- Maaf Vaziri, Sowme'eh Sara County
- Moaf, Bandar-e Anzali
- Moaf, Masal

== Organizations ==
- Museum of American Finance

== See also ==
- MAAF (disambiguation)
