= Golshan, Gilan =

Village in Gilan province, Iran

Golshan Persian: گلشن
- Village
- Location within Iran
- Coordinates: 37°27′12″N 49°39′03″E
- Country: Iran
- Province: Gilan
- County: Bandar-e Anzali
- District: Central
- Rural District: Licharaki-ye Hasan Rud

Population (2016)
  - Total: 897
- Time zone: UTC+3:30 (IRST)

Golshan (Persian: گلشن) (Note: Also known as Gulshan) is a village in Licharaki-ye Hasan Rud Rural District (Note: Also known as Licharegi-ye Hasan Rud Rural District) of the Central District in Bandar-e Anzali County, (Note: Formerly Bandar-e Pahlavi County) Gilan province, Iran.

== Demographics ==
=== Population ===
At the time of the 2006 National Census, the village's population was 838 in 248 households. The following census in 2011 counted 927 people in 291 households. The 2016 census measured the population of the village as 897 people in 312 households.
