= Khomiran, Bandar-e Anzali =

Khomiran خميران
- Village
- Location within Iran
- Coordinates: 37°29′59″N 49°15′39″E
- Country: Iran
- Province: Gilan
- County: Bandar-e Anzali
- Bakhsh: Central
- Rural District: Chahar Farizeh

Population (2006)
  - Total: 405
- Time zone: UTC+3:30 (IRST)

Khomiran (Persian: خميران, also Romanized as Khomīrān and Khomeyrān; also known as Khumaran) is a village in Chahar Farizeh Rural District, in the Central District of Bandar-e Anzali County, Gilan Province, Iran. At the 2016 census, its population was 275, in 109 families. Decreased from 405 people in 2006.
