= Siah Khaleh Sar =

Village in Gilan province, Iran

Siah Khaleh Sar Persian: سياه خاله سر
- Village
- Location within Iran
- Coordinates: 37°30′54″N 49°14′03″E
- Country: Iran
- Province: Gilan
- County: Bandar-e Anzali
- District: Central
- Rural District: Chahar Farizeh

Population (2016)
  - Total: 361
- Time zone: UTC+3:30 (IRST)

Siah Khaleh Sar (Persian: سياه خاله سر) (Note: Also romanized as Sīāh Khāleh Sar; also known as Sīāh Khāleh, Sīāhālsar, and Siakhalsar) is a village in Chahar Farizeh Rural District of the Central District in Bandar-e Anzali County, (Note: Formerly Bandar-e Pahlavi County) Gilan province, Iran.

== Demographics ==
=== Population ===
At the time of the 2006 National Census, the village's population was 508 in 165 households. The following census in 2011 counted 429 people in 161 households. The 2016 census measured the population of the village as 361 people in 149 households.
