= Eshpala =

Eshpala اشپلا
- Village
- Location within Iran
- Coordinates: 37°28′39″N 49°17′07″E
- Country: Iran
- Province: Gilan
- County: Bandar-e Anzali
- Bakhsh: Central
- Rural District: Chahar Farizeh

Population (2006)
  - Total: 200
- Time zone: UTC+3:30 (IRST)

Eshpala (Persian: اشپلا, also Romanized as Eshpalā; also known as Eshbālīq, Eshbelā, Eshīlā, and Ishpala) is a village in Chahar Farizeh Rural District, in the Central District of Bandar-e Anzali County, Gilan Province, Iran. At the 2016 census, its population was 136, in 52 families. Down from 200 people in 2006.
