= Kachalak =

Village in Gilan province, Iran

Kachalak Persian: کچلک
- Village
- Location within Iran
- Coordinates: 37°32′41″N 49°12′25″E
- Country: Iran
- Province: Gilan
- County: Bandar-e Anzali
- District: Central
- Rural District: Chahar Farizeh

Population (2016)
  - Total: 491
- Time zone: UTC+3:30 (IRST)

Kachalak (Persian: کچلک) (Note: Also romanized as Kechalak; also known as Kadzhlak, Keshlak, and Kichlek) is a village in Chahar Farizeh Rural District of the Central District in Bandar-e Anzali County, (Note: Formerly Bandar-e Pahlavi County) Gilan province, Iran.

== Demographics ==
=== Population ===
At the time of the 2006 National Census, the village's population was 526 in 144 households. The following census in 2011 counted 549 people in 163 households. The 2016 census measured the population of the village as 491 people in 163 households.
