= Siah Vazan =

Siah Vazan سياه وزان
- Village
- Location within Iran
- Coordinates: 37°32′09″N 49°13′21″E
- Country: Iran
- Province: Gilan
- County: Bandar-e Anzali
- Bakhsh: Central
- Rural District: Chahar Farizeh

Population (2016)
  - Total: 246
- Time zone: UTC+3:30 (IRST)

Siah Vazan (Persian: سياه وزان, also Romanized as Sīāh Vazān; also known as Sāvehzān, Sāwezān, Sevezan, Sīāh Būzān, Sīāvazān, and Sīāvazān) is a village in Chahar Farizeh Rural District, in the Central District of Bandar-e Anzali County, Gilan Province, Iran. At the 2016 census, its population was 246, in 91 families. Up from 210 in 2006.
