= Aliabad, Bandar-e Anzali =

Village in Gilan province, Iran

Aliabad Persian: علي آباد
- Village
- Location within Iran
- Coordinates: 37°32′34″N 49°14′39″E
- Country: Iran
- Province: Gilan
- County: Bandar-e Anzali
- District: Central
- Rural District: Chahar Farizeh

Population (2016)
  - Total: 749
- Time zone: UTC+3:30 (IRST)

Aliabad (Persian: علی آباد) (Note: Also romanized as ‘Alīābād; formerly known as Aliabad-e Kapur Chal (علی آباد کپورچال), also romanized as ‘Alīābād-e Kapūr Chāl) is a village in Chahar Farizeh Rural District of the Central District in Bandar-e Anzali County, (Note: Formerly Bandar-e Pahlavi County) Gilan province, Iran.

== Demographics ==
=== Population ===
At the time of the 2006 National Census, the village's population, as Aliabad-e Kapur Chal, was 896 in 263 households. The following census in 2011 counted 860 people in 279 households, by which time the village was listed as Aliabad. The 2016 census measured the population of the village as 749 people in 269 households.
