= Mahruzeh =

Mahruzeh ماهروزه
- Village
- Location within Iran
- Coordinates: 37°26′06″N 49°23′28″E
- Country: Iran
- Province: Gilan
- County: Bandar-e Anzali
- Bakhsh: Central
- Rural District: Chahar Farizeh

Population (2016)
  - Total: 25
- Time zone: UTC+3:30 (IRST)

Mahruzeh (Persian: ماهروزه, also Romanized as Māhrūzeh; also known as Māhrazeh, Māraz, Mārūzak, and Maruze) is a village in Chahar Farizeh Rural District, in the Central District of Bandar-e Anzali County, Gilan Province, Iran. At the 2016 census, its population was 25, in 8 families.
