= Moaf, Bandar-e Anzali =

Moaf معاف
- Village
- Location within Iran
- Coordinates: 37°24′21″N 49°16′40″E
- Country: Iran
- Province: Gilan
- County: Bandar-e Anzali
- Bakhsh: Central
- Rural District: Chahar Farizeh

Population (2016)
  - Total: 164
- Time zone: UTC+3:30 (IRST)

Moaf (Persian: معاف, also Romanized as Mo‘āf) is a village in Chahar Farizeh Rural District, in the Central District of Bandar-e Anzali County, Gilan Province, Iran. At the 2016 census, its population was 164, in 70 families. Down from 219 people in 2006.
