= Jefrud =

Jefrud or Jafrud (Persian: جفرود) may refer to:

- Jefrud-e Bala
- Jefrud-e Pain
