= Jefrud-e Pain =

Village in Gilan province, Iran

Jefrud-e Pain Persian: جفرودپائين
- Village
- Location within Iran
- Coordinates: 37°26′58″N 49°40′41″E
- Country: Iran
- Province: Gilan
- County: Bandar-e Anzali
- District: Central
- Rural District: Licharaki-ye Hasan Rud

Population (2016)
  - Total: 868
- Time zone: UTC+3:30 (IRST)

Jefrud-e Pain (Persian: جفرودپائين) (Note: Also romanized as Jefrūd-e Pā’īn) is a village in Licharaki-ye Hasan Rud Rural District (Note: Also known as Licharegi-ye Hasan Rud Rural District) of the Central District in Bandar-e Anzali County, (Note: Formerly Bandar-e Pahlavi County) Gilan province, Iran.

== Demographics ==
=== Population ===
At the time of the 2006 National Census, the village's population was 760 in 228 households. The following census in 2011 counted 859 people in 280 households. The 2016 census measured the population of the village as 868 people in 301 households.
