= Maraz =

Maraz may refer to:

- Maraz, a fiber and cloth made out of the mohair of Maraz goat
- Mahruzeh, a village in Guilan, Iran

== People ==
- Adriana Maraž (1931–2015), Slovene graphic artist
- Maraz Hossain Opi (born 2001), Bangladeshi footballer
