= Torbehgudeh =

Village in Gilan province, Iran

Torbehgudeh Persian: تربه گوده
- Village
- Location within Iran
- Coordinates: 37°26′57″N 49°32′03″E
- Country: Iran
- Province: Gilan
- County: Bandar-e Anzali
- District: Central
- Rural District: Licharaki-ye Hasan Rud

Population (2016)
  - Total: 282
- Time zone: UTC+3:30 (IRST)

Torbehgudeh (Persian: تربه گوده) (Note: Also romanized as Torbehgūdeh; also known as Nazbagūdeh, Torbehkūdeh, and Torobgūdeh) is a village in Licharaki-ye Hasan Rud Rural District (Note: Also known as Licharegi-ye Hasan Rud Rural District) of the Central District in Bandar-e Anzali County, (Note: Formerly Bandar-e Pahlavi County) Gilan province, Iran.

== Demographics ==
=== Population ===
At the time of the 2006 National Census, the village's population was 299 in 83 households. The following census in 2011 counted 327 people in 94 households. The 2016 census measured the population of the village as 282 people in 89 households.
