= Talebabad, Gilan =

Village in Gilan province, Iran

Talebabad Persian: طالب آباد
- Village
- Location within Iran
- Coordinates: 37°27′26″N 49°34′10″E
- Country: Iran
- Province: Gilan
- County: Bandar-e Anzali
- District: Central
- Rural District: Licharaki-ye Hasan Rud

Population (2016)
  - Total: 2,362
- Time zone: UTC+3:30 (IRST)

Talebabad (Persian: طالب آباد) (Note: Also romanized as Ţālebābād; also known as Taleb Abad Torob Gowdeh) is a village in Licharaki-ye Hasan Rud Rural District (Note: Also known as Licharegi-ye Hasan Rud Rural District) of the Central District in Bandar-e Anzali County, (Note: Formerly Bandar-e Pahlavi County) Gilan province, Iran.

== Demographics ==
=== Population ===
At the time of the 2006 National Census, the village's population was 1,992 in 572 households. The following census in 2011 counted 2,153 people in 678 households. The 2016 census measured the population of the village as 2,362 people in 747 households. It was the most populous village in its rural district.
