= Anzali Lagoon =

Lagoon in Gilan, Iran

Coordinates: 37°28′16″N 49°27′44″E

Designations

Ramsar Wetland
- Official name: Anzali Wetland Complex
- Designated: 23 June 1975
- Reference no.: 40

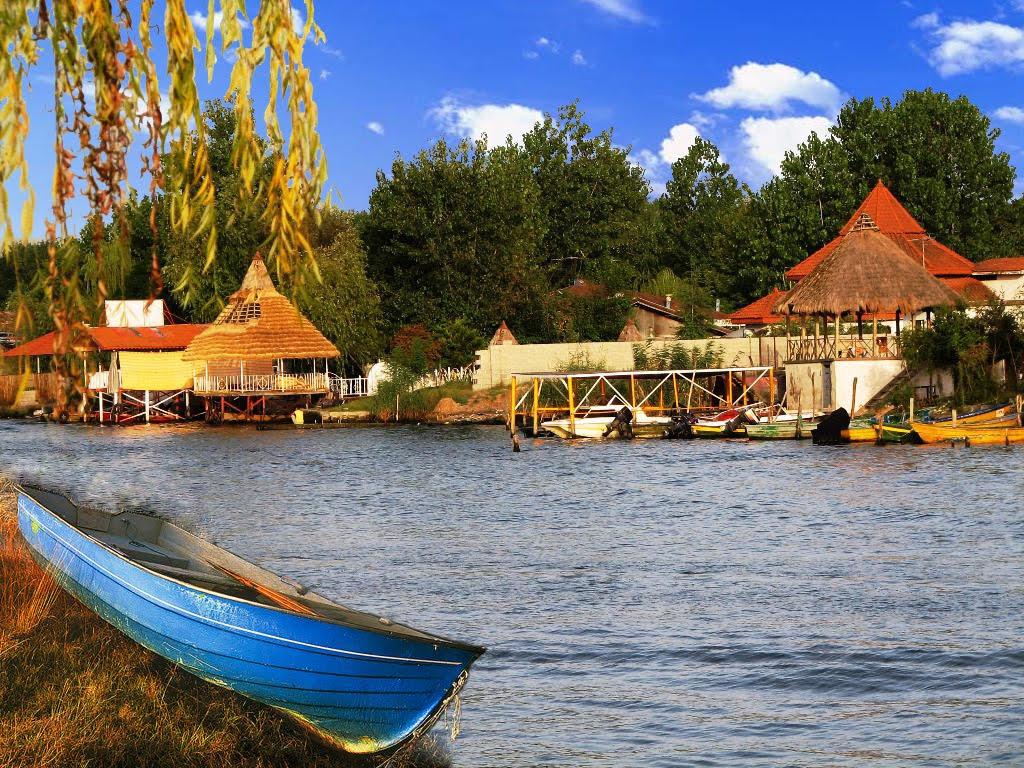

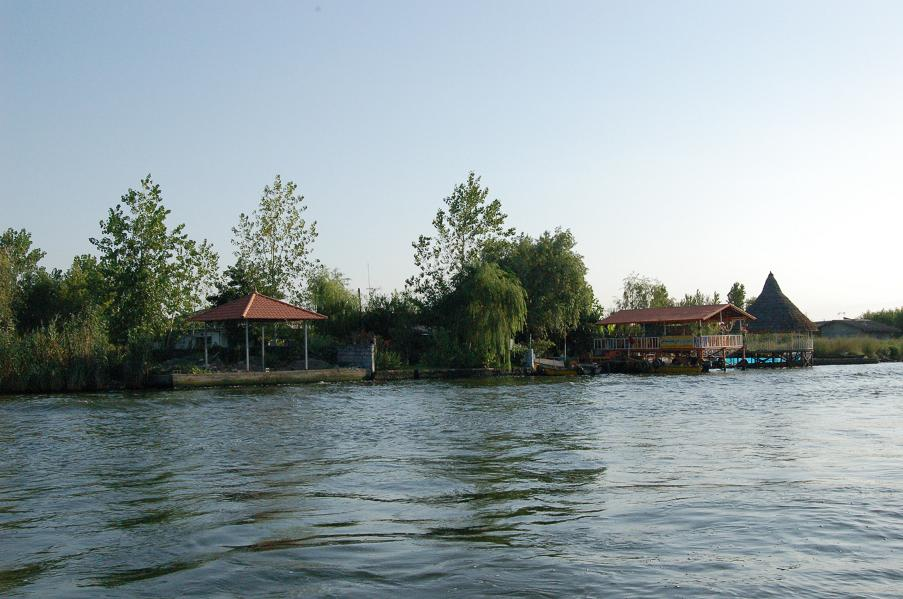
Anzali Lagoon

Anzali Lagoon (Gilaki: اٚنزٚلي سٚل Persian: تالاب انزلی) (also Anzali Mordab, Anzali Bay, Pahlavi Mordab, Pahlavi Bay or Anzali Liman) is a coastal liman, or lagoon, in the Caspian Sea near Bandar-e Anzali, in the northern Iranian province of Gilan. The lagoon divides Bandar-e Anzali into two parts, and is home to both the Selke Wildlife Refuge and the Siahkesheem Marsh.

== History ==
Although the lagoon suffers from pollution, it is known as a good place for bird watching. The lagoon's water ranges from fresh near the tributary streams to brackish near the mouth into the harbor and the sea. Studies indicate that the lagoon had a much higher salinity in the 19th and early 20th centuries.

The lagoon has decreased in size since the 1930s to less than a quarter of its former extent. However, in the last ten years (As of 2007) water salinity has increased both by rising water levels in the Caspian Sea, which has caused greater interchange of waters, and due to greater salt transport in incoming "fresh" water due to increased upstream irrigation.

The lagoon has been listed in the Ramsar Convention since 21 December 1975.

== Fishery ==
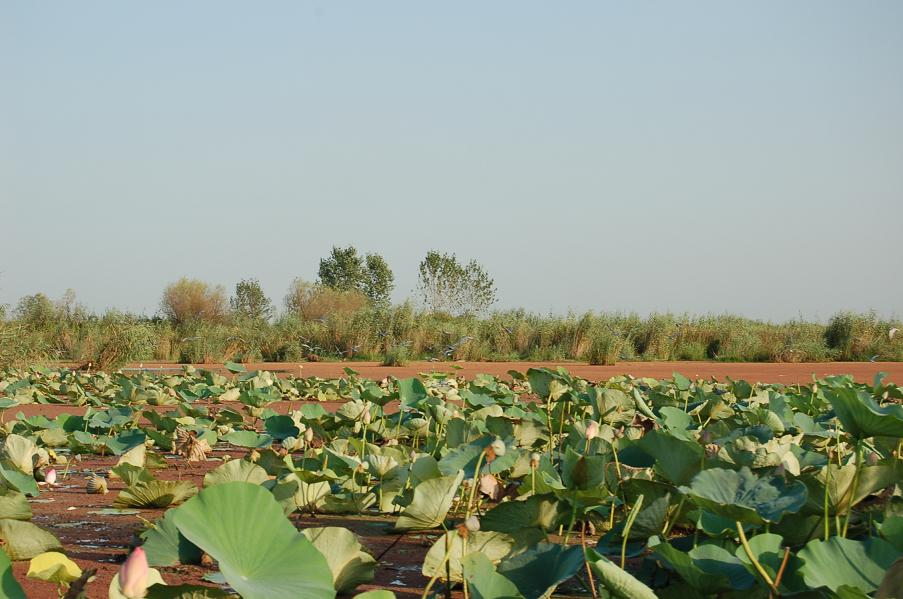
Anzali Lagoon showing growth of Caspian lotus (Nelumbo caspicum) and mats of Azolla filiculoides fern.

Prior to 1950, the Anzali Lagoon provided about 70% of the commercial fish taken in Gilan province, with catches of over 5,000 tons annually. Commercial fishing was done during the spring and autumn spawning cycles when the kutum, pike-perch and bream, would enter the lagoon from the Caspian. However, a number of factors acted against the continuation of the fishery and by the time commercial fishing ceased in 1960 annual catches were less than 100 tons.

Heavy siltation from increased upstream irrigation had resulted in the shrinkage and shallowing of the lagoon, increased pollution of the source waters and eutrophication due to an increased nutrient load contributed to the destruction of the fishery. More recently the surface of the lagoon has become gradually overgrown with aquatic macrophytes, primarily the non-native water-fern, Azolla filiculoides, and this has caused increased eutrophication, creating large areas of the lagoon where there is insufficient dissolved oxygen for fish to survive.

== Geography ==
The lagoon is located in an area of 15,000 hectares near the northern port city of Bandar Anzali in Gilan province. Its geographical coordinates are located at 28 to 37 north latitude and 25 to 49 east longitude. Due to its geographical location, Anzali wetland is distinguished among other wetlands in Iran in terms of its excessive humidity and rainfall. Although this subject fluctuates depending on the amount of rainfall and the duration of the drought.

Anzali is one of the few Iranian wetlands which have been registered as an international wetland in the 1975 Ramsar Convention. Wetlands are considered the most biologically diverse of all ecosystems; however, the Anzali Wetland has also been the victim of the authorities neglect, putting it in danger of grave ecological changes.

The use of Anzali Wetland's bank as the city dump and the release of human and industrial waste into the wetland have already put in danger the lives of animal species and at least 78 species of birds living in the area. Besides, some local authorities plan to build a sports field in a peninsula connected to the wetland. This will be the final blow to the wetland, which has so far been prevented only by the serious opposition of environmentalists to the construction of the sports field.

=== Islands ===
Among the islands located in the lagoon are Bozorg, Kouchak, and Mianposhteh.

== Climatic conditions ==
Anzali lagoon generally has hot and humid summers and mild winters. The atmospheric characteristics of Anzali lagoon are similar to Anzali and Ghazian, but the amount of humidity in the lagoon is higher than the neighboring areas. The minimum temperature in winter is close to, or equal to, zero degrees Celsius and rarely falls below zero. The maximum temperature in the middle of summer is between 33 and 36 degrees Celsius.

== Ecology ==
This wetland has a special environment due to the presence of animals and plants, the morphology, shape of the stream bed, the connection with the rivers and the sea.

=== Biodiversity ===
Anzali Wetland is a spawning place for aquatic animals and a habitat for native and migratory birds. This wetland has a unique ecosystem with hundreds of plant species, 50 fish species, and more than 100 bird species. Anzali lagoon is also one of the most important sources of reproduction and production of sturgeon and bony fish in the Caspian Sea.

==== Plants ====
The plants of this wetland are divided into three categories: submerged plants, floating plants and marginal plants.

===== marginal plants =====
In this type of plants, all or most of the vegetative and reproductive organs of the plant are located outside the water. Most of the plants forming this layer grow on the edge of the marsh and nearby rivers. The following plants can be seen in this layer: Phragmites australis,Sparganium, Typha latifolia, Sirpus Polygonum, Blue oregano Blue slingshot, Blue heron Bottoms, Nelombo, horse tail

===== Floating plants =====
The plants of this layer are floating on the surface of the water, that is, the main parts of the plant, especially the leaves, are floating on the surface of the water, and the reproductive parts or The face is floating or out of water. Special organs like spongy tissues facilitate the plant's buoyancy. Special organs like spongy tissues facilitate the plant's buoyancy. Most of the plants of the floating layer and vegetation of the marsh and the nearby river can be named as follows: Otricularia. Shalvin. Hydrocharis.Spirodela polyrhiza . Salvia staminea. Despirodela.

==== Animals ====
Anzali International Wetland, located in the southwest of the Caspian Sea, plays a strategic role in establishing an ecological balance between animals and birds due to its special characteristics. This wetland serves as a place for natural reproduction and recovery of various groups of Caspian Sea fish. It also serves as a habitat and spawning ground for migratory Caspian Sea fish in the early stages of their lives. More than 110 species and subspecies of fish from 18 families in the Caspian Sea and its catchment area have been reported in this wetland, including native, non-native and ornamental fish species. The fish of Anzali Wetland maintain commercial, economic, environmental, recreational and sporting value. Most of the fish in Gilan waters belong to the Cyprinidae, Gobiidae and Clupeidae families and constitute about 75 percent of the total Caspian Sea fish population.

Anzali International Wetland is one of the most important bird sites in Iran and the region. A total of 243 bird species, including 112 aquatic and 131 terrestrial species, were identified. The largest number of bird species was recorded in spring, and more than 70% of the wetland birds are migratory and wintering. Nine species of birds that are at risk of extinction were identified. This study shows that despite being registered in the Ramsar Convention sites in Montreux, Anzali Wetland is still an important site for birds, especially waterfowl.

== catchment area ==
The lagoon has an area of about 374 thousand hectares. Anzali Wetland has 11 main rivers and 30 sub-rivers which, after irrigating the fields and paddy fields upstream, enter it along with the surface flows of the watershed of the Wetland. The maximum water depth of the lagoon in spring and in the western areas of the lagoon reaches 2.5 meters, which varies due to the fluctuations of the water level of the Caspian Sea.

• 9.53%: forest and pasture

• 2.33%: Agricultural lands

• 7.8%: wetlands, dams and pools

• 7.3%: areas used privately by people.

=== Tributaries ===
The following rivers and streams flow into the Anzali Lagoon.

- Pirbazar
- Pasikhan
- Shakhraz
- Gazrudbar
- Massuleh
- Palanghvar
- Abatar
- Khalkai
- Morghak
- Bahambar
- Shaf
