= Licharaki-ye Hasan Rud Rural District =

Rural district in Gilan province, Iran

Licharaki-ye Hasan Rud Rural District Persian: دهستان ليچارکي حسن رود
- Rural District
- Location within Iran
- Coordinates: 37°25′N 49°33′E
- Country: Iran
- Province: Gilan
- County: Bandar-e Anzali
- District: Central
- Established: 1987
- Capital: Licharaki-ye Hasan Rud

Population (2016)
  - Total: 8,244
- Time zone: UTC+3:30 (IRST)

Licharaki-ye Hasan Rud Rural District (Persian: دهستان ليچارکي حسن رود) (Note: Also known as Licharegi-ye Hasan Rud Rural District (دهستان ليچارگي حسن رود)) is in the Central District of Bandar-e Anzali County, (Note: Formerly Bandar-e Pahlavi County) Gilan province, Iran. Its capital is the village of Licharaki-ye Hasan Rud.

== Demographics ==
=== Population ===
At the time of the 2006 National Census, the rural district's population was 7,335 in 2,149 households. There were 8,377 inhabitants in 4,387 households at the following census of 2011. The 2016 census measured the population of the rural district as 8,244 inhabitants in 2,711 households. The most populous of its seven villages was Talebabad, with 2,362 people.

=== Other villages in the rural district ===
- Golshan
- Hasan Rud
- Jefrud-e Pain
- Shanghai Pardeh
- Torbehgudeh
