= MAAF =

MAAF is a four-letter acronym that may stand for:

- Malayan Auxiliary Air Force, original precursor of the Royal Malaysian Air Force
- Mediterranean Allied Air Forces, was the major Allied air force command organization in the Mediterranean theater from mid-December 1943 until the end of the Second World War.
- Michael Army Airfield at Dugway Proving Ground, abbreviated as Michael AAF or MAAF
- Military Association of Atheists & Freethinkers
- magical African-American friend, a stock character in fiction
- Mutuelle d'assurance des artisans de France, a French insurance company
