= Chahar Farizeh Rural District =

Rural district in Gilan province, Iran

Chahar Farizeh Rural District Persian: دهستان چهار فريضه
- Rural District
- Location within Iran
- Coordinates: 37°29′N 49°20′E
- Country: Iran
- Province: Gilan
- County: Bandar-e Anzali
- District: Central
- Established: 1987
- Capital: Kapurchal

Population (2016)
  - Total: 12,207
- Time zone: UTC+3:30 (IRST)

Chahar Farizeh Rural District (Persian: دهستان چهار فريضه) is in the Central District of Bandar-e Anzali County, (Note: Formerly Bandar-e Pahlavi County) Gilan province, in northwestern Iran. Its capital is the village of Kapurchal.

== Demographics ==
=== Population ===
At the time of the 2006 National Census, the rural district's population was 13,829 in 4,237 households. There were 12,960 inhabitants in 4,387 households at the following census of 2011. The 2016 census measured the population of the rural district as 12,207 in 4,428 households. The most populous of its 20 villages was Bashman, with 2,320 people.

=== Other villages in the rural district ===
- Abkenar
- Aliabad-e Kapur Chal
- Chay Bijar
- Eshpala
- Kachalak
- Karkan
- Khomiran
- Kuchek Mahalleh
- Mahruzeh
- Moaf
- Oshtarkan
- Rud Posht
- Sangachin
- Shileh Sar
- Siah Khaleh Sar
- Siah Vazan
- Torbeh Bar
