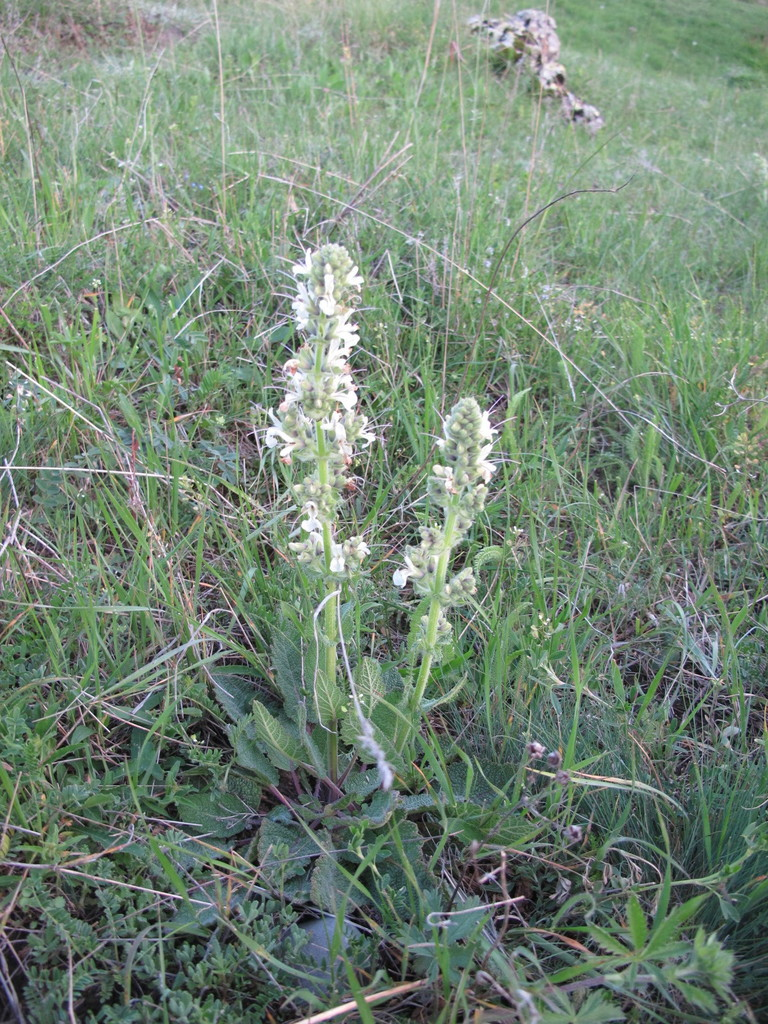

Scientific classification
- Kingdom: Plantae
- Clade: Tracheophytes
- Clade: Angiosperms
- Clade: Eudicots
- Clade: Asterids
- Order: Lamiales
- Family: Lamiaceae
- Genus: Salvia
- Species: S. staminea

Binomial name
- Salvia staminea Montbr. & Aucher ex Benth.

= Salvia staminea =

Species of shrub

Salvia staminea is a herbaceous perennial shrub native to a wide area in Asia Minor that includes Turkey, Georgia, Armenia, and Iran, where it grows at elevations from 6,000 feet (1,800 m) to 14,000 feet (4,300 m). It is typically found growing in alpine meadows, screes, and cliffs, sometimes growing with scrub oak. Due to the wide variety of habitats in which it is found, there is a wide degree of variation in the species. It was first described in 1836 and has only slowly come into use in horticulture.

Salvia staminea is an erect plant that grows up to 2.5 feet (0.76 m) tall and less in width. The dark green ovate leaves grow on a petiole and vary in size, reaching up to 6 inches (15 cm) long and 2 inches (5.1 cm) wide. The flowers are creamy to off-white, and less than .5 inches (1.3 cm) long. The branched inflorescences reaches 2 feet (0.61 m) long, with two to six flowers growing in spaced whorls.
