= Bandar-e Anzali =

City in Gilan province, Iran

Bandar-e Anzali بندرانزلی (Persian) اٚنزٚلي (Gilaki)
- City
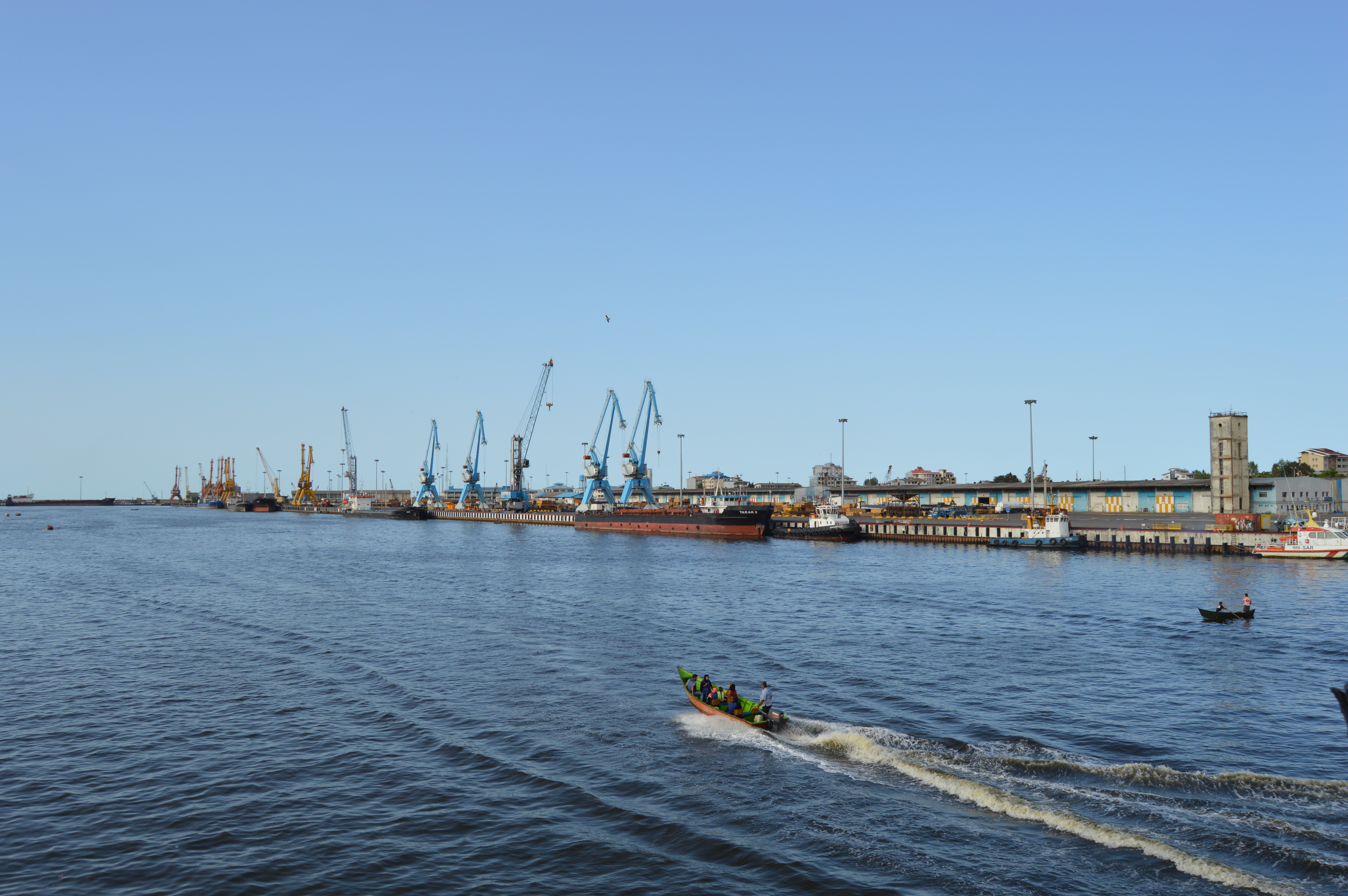
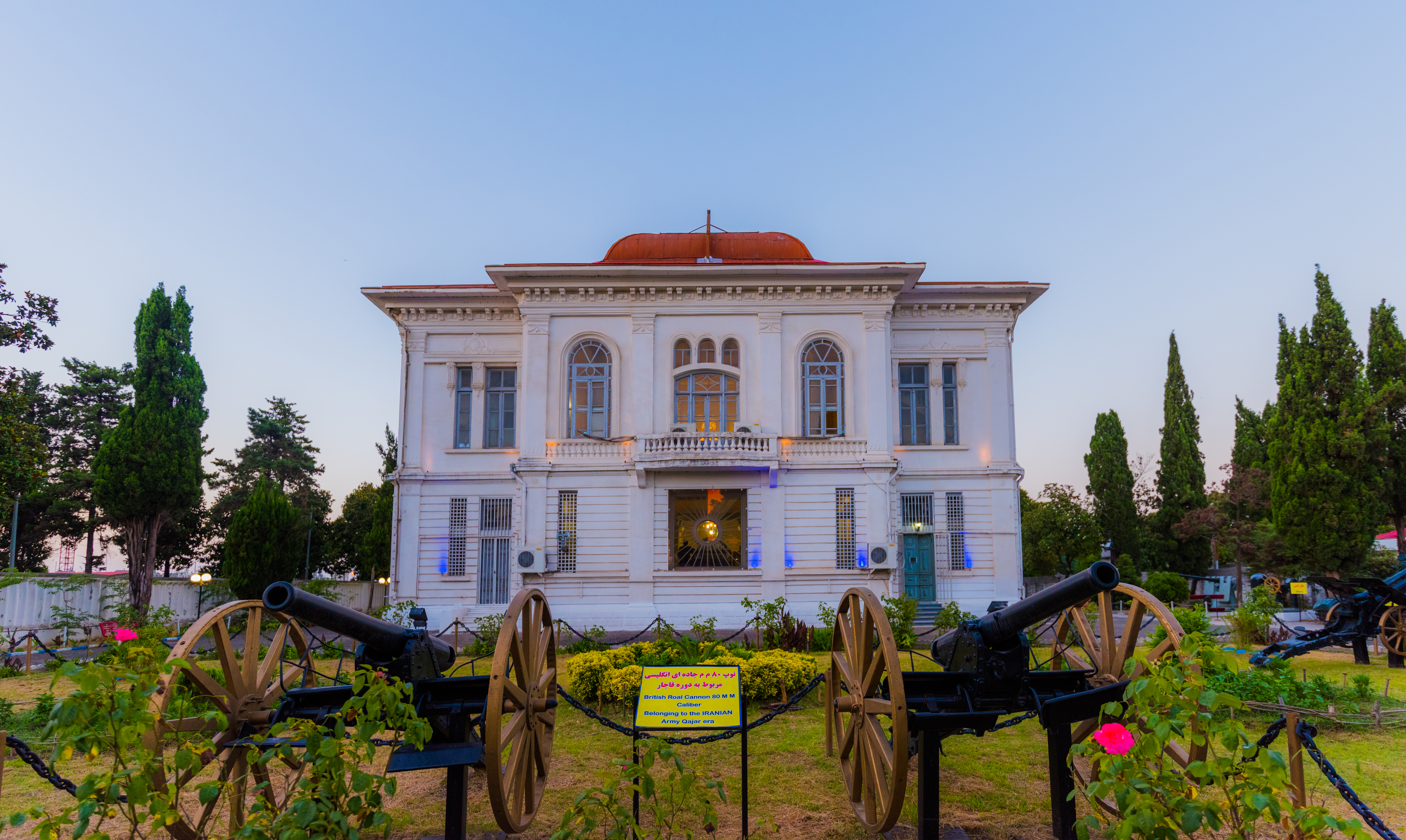
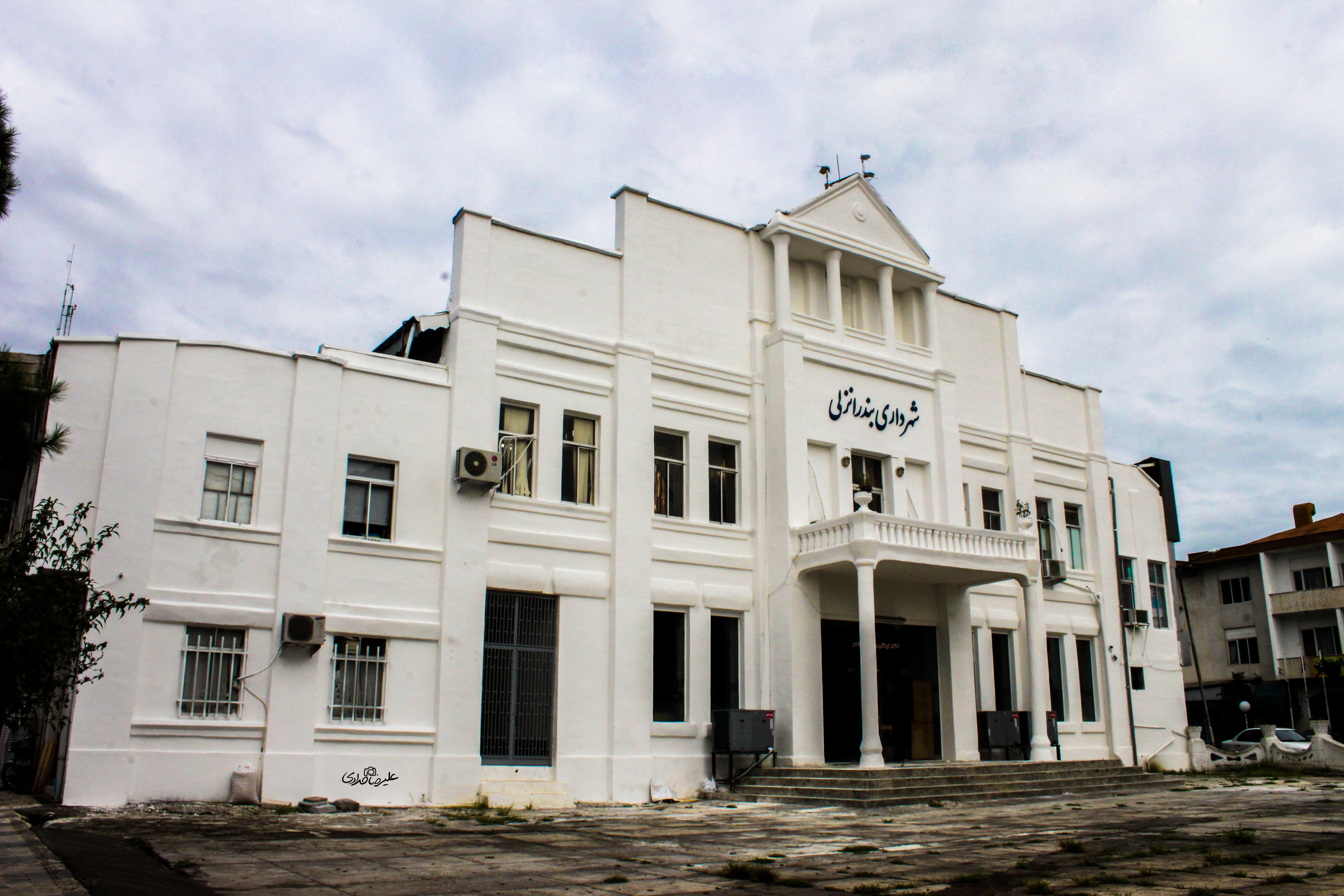
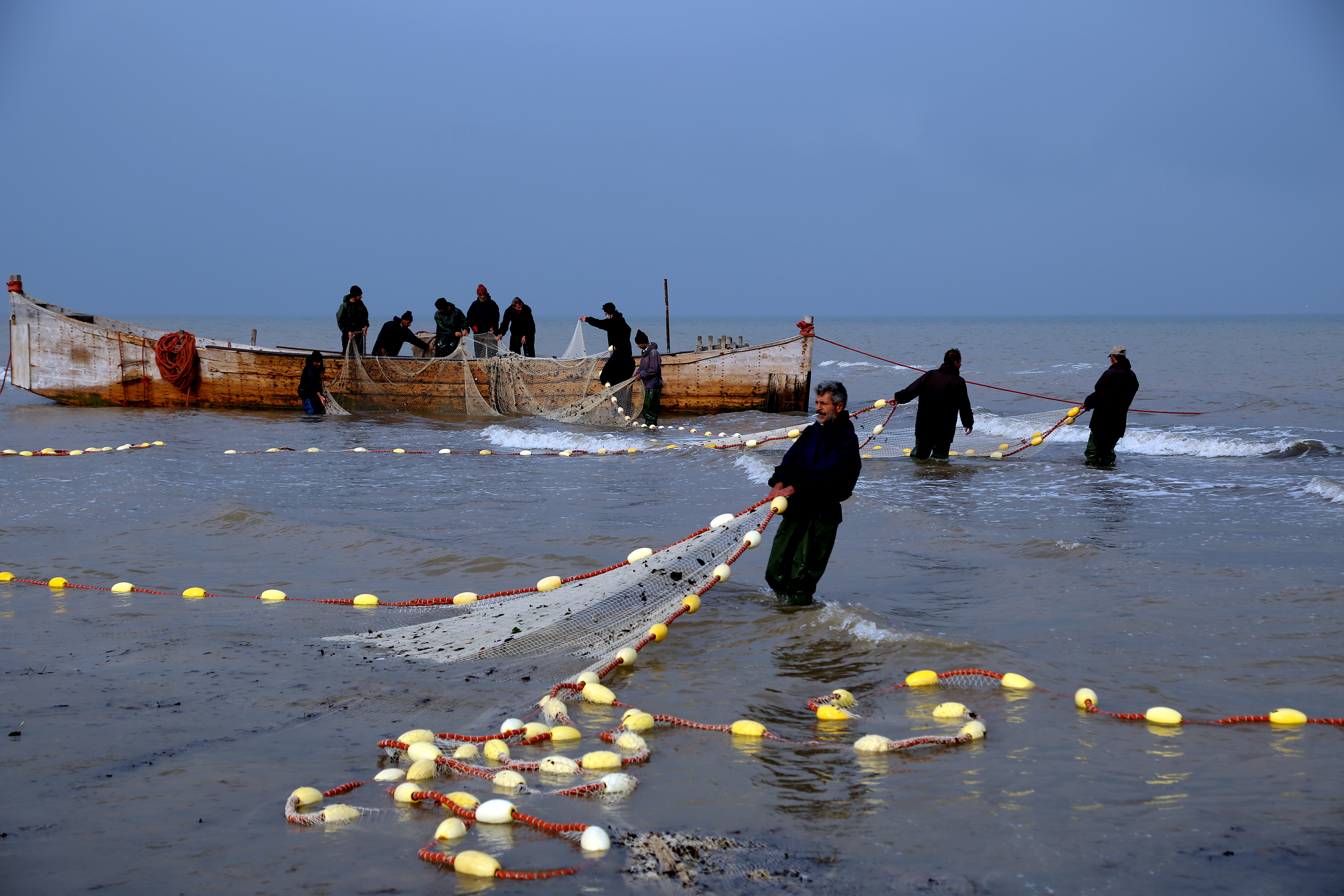
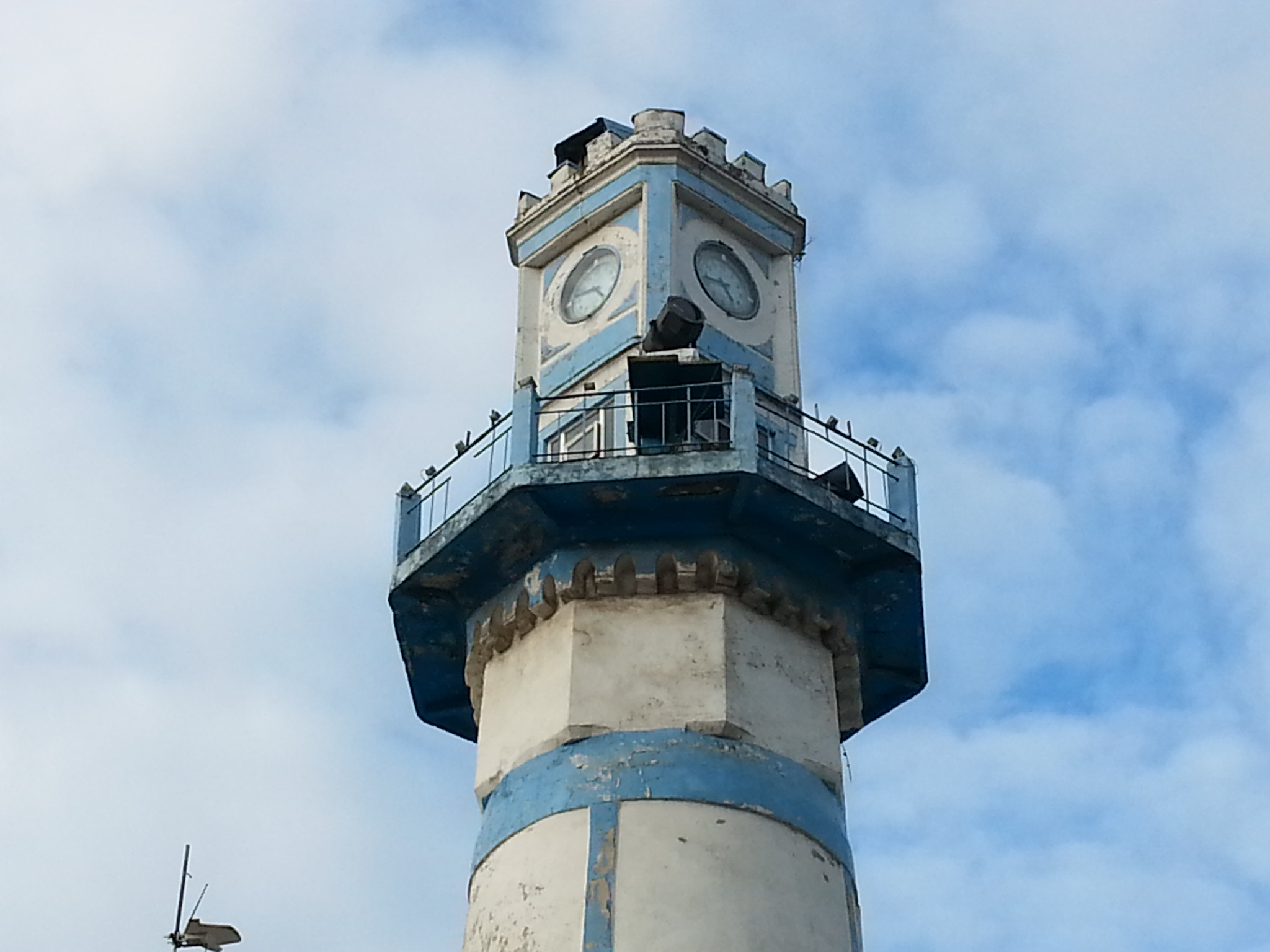
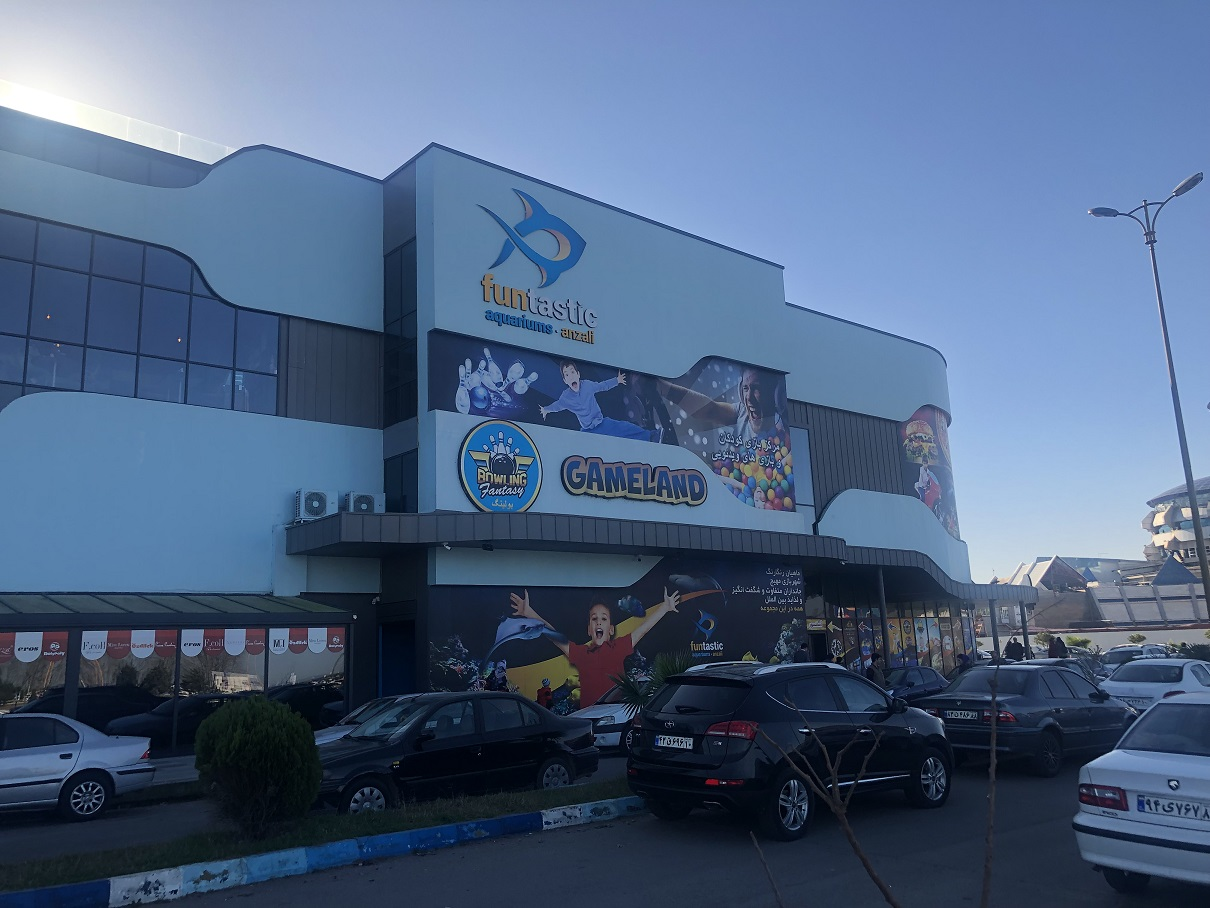

- Location within Iran
- Coordinates: 37°28′15″N 49°28′12″E
- Country: Iran
- Province: Gilan
- County: Bandar-e Anzali
- District: Central District

Government
  - Mayor: Hamid Dalkouhi

Population (2016)
  - Total: 118,564
- Time zone: UTC+3:30 (IRST)
- Website: www.anzali.ir

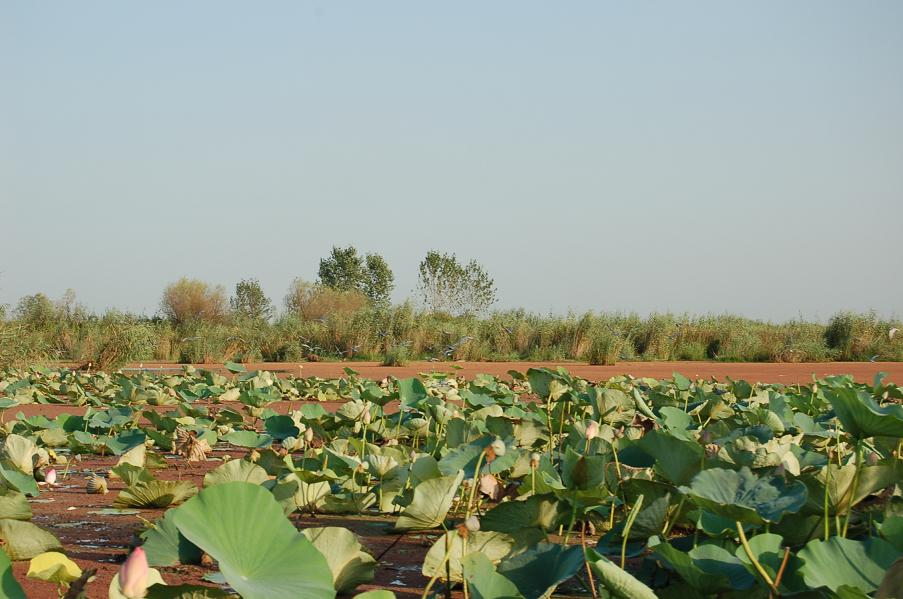
Anzali Lagoon on the Caspian Sea

Bandar-e Anzali (Persian: بندرانزلی; Gilaki: اٚنزٚلي) (Note: Also romanized as Bandar-e Anzalī; formerly Bandar-e Pahlavi (بندر پهلوی) during Pahlavi Iran;) is a city on the Caspian Sea in the Central District of Bandar-e Anzali County in Gilan province, Iran, serving as the capital of both the county and the district.

== History ==
Anzali is an old city in ancient Iran, first settled by the Cadusii. Owing to their pleasant relationship with Cyrus the Great, King of Anshan (Persia), and their military cooperation in Cyrus's founding of the Achaemenian Empire, the Cadusii adopted the name Anshan-e Pars (Ανσνάν in Greek), meaning "the Anshans of Persia".

This word in Middle Persian is Anzalag; a variant Persian form is Anzalazh. Anzali Gulf was a safe harbour for trade ships and fishing boats. It was renamed Pahlavi in 1935.

In 1919, with the collapse of General Anton Denikin's White Russian army, eighteen of his ships sought refuge in Anzali. On 18 May 1920, a Soviet flotilla of thirteen ships launched a surprise attack on Anzali, capturing the British garrison and the eighteen White Russian ships. This allowed for the establishment of the short-lived Persian Socialist Republic and the Persian Communist Party. Soviet authorities denied responsibility for the attack, blaming the local Russian naval commander for attacking under his own authority.

== Demographics ==
=== Language ===
The people of Anzali speak Gilaki and Azerbaijani languages.

The people of Anzali speak Persian as the national language. Specific Anzali Accent of Western Gilaki language is the main language of Anzali.

Linguistic composition of the city.

Bandar-e Anzali linguistic composition
language	percent
Persian	70%
Gilaki	20%
Azerbaijani	10%

=== Religion ===
The majority of Anzalis are adherents of Shia Islam, although there is a sizeable Armenian Christian minority.

=== Population ===
Population history
Year	Pop.	±%
1956	3,134	—
1966	41,785	+1233.3%
1976	55,481	+32.8%
1986	87,063	+56.9%
1991	94,697	+8.8%
1996	98,544	+4.1%
2006	109,687	+11.3%
2011	116,664	+6.4%
2016	118,564	+1.6%

At the time of the 2006 National Census, the city's population was 109,687 in 32,424 households. The following census in 2011 counted 116,664 people in 38,128 households. The 2016 census measured the population of the city as 118,564 people in 41,053 households.

== Overview ==
Anzali is one of the most important cities in Iran in terms of tourism, economics, and athletics. Bandar-e Anzali is the biggest Gilaki speaking city in the world after Rasht, the capital of Gilan province. The city was home to the first and biggest port on the southern shores of the Caspian Sea. Bandar-e Anzali consists of an island called Mianposhteh and the surrounding lands. Tourist attractions include a clock tower called Manareh, the long harbour promenade, and the water-logged delta and beach along the Sefid Rud.

Its wonderful lagoon, Customs and City Hall edifice (Shahrdari), Mian Poshte Palace, and Motamedi Edifice are its tourist attractions. Anzali was the site of the Caspian University of Naval Science until 1980, when it was moved to Nowshahr. Naser-al-din Shah's Shams-ol-Emareh tower (not to be confused with the Tehran building of the same name) was built by Moayer al Mamalek. The famous Sangi Bath was destroyed by people and natural factors.

The Sangi Bath was noted for its marvelous durable system of basins with heated water. Some groups think that Motamedi Edifice had been changed; it is now its police office. This Ghajar Structure built in two floors with the help of Mirza Abd-ol-Vahab.

== Geography ==
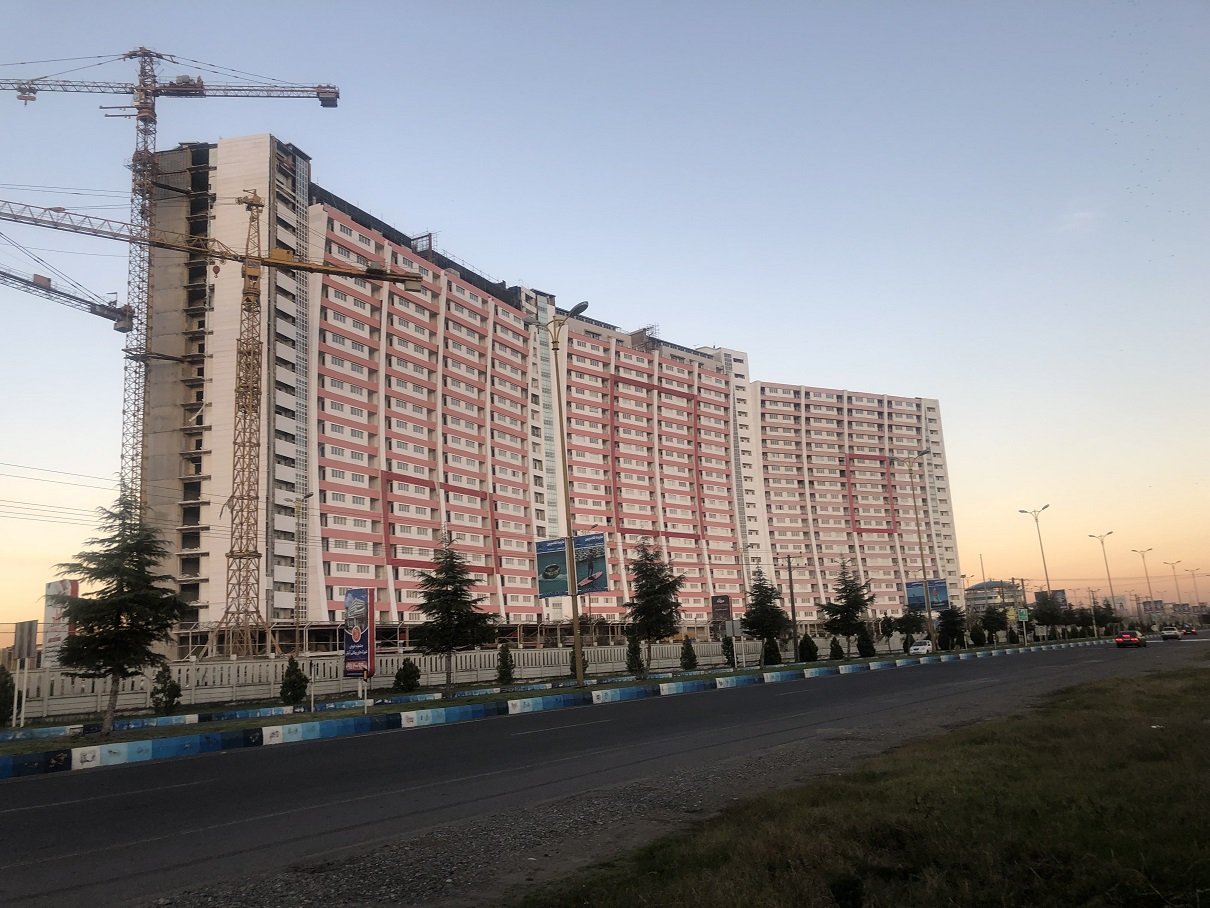
Tovoos Tower, the tallest tower in Bandar-e Anzali

The Anzali Lagoon divides the Anzali Port in two parts. The city is connected by two bridges to the Beheshti Island. There is a caviar processing factory in Bandar-e Anzali, some old ruins from 19th century and the popular Shanbeh Bazaar. Tourbebar is a village about 40 kilometers from Bandar-e Anzali, near the Anzali Lagoon.

=== Climate ===
Bandar-e Anzali has a humid subtropical climate, with (Cfa) designation under the Köppen climate classification and (Cf) designation under the Trewartha climate classification. The weather is hot and humid in summers and cool, damp and rainy in winters. It has the most humid climate of any city in Iran, similar in its heavy autumn and early winter rainfall, persistent high humidity and low sunshine to the Sea of Japan coast of Japan, though it receives much less summer rainfall than that region. The warm and humid weather has allowed this region to grow crops such as rice and tea that require very large amounts of moisture, especially with the extra water draining from the Elburz Mountains.

Climate data for Bandar-e Anzali (1991-2020, extremes 1951-present)
Month	Jan	Feb	Mar	Apr	May	Jun	Jul	Aug	Sep	Oct	Nov	Dec	Year
Record high °C (°F)	29 (84)	31 (88)	35.4 (95.7)	36.0 (96.8)	36.8 (98.2)	36.3 (97.3)	37 (99)	36 (97)	35.3 (95.5)	37 (99)	34 (93)	31 (88)	37 (99)
Mean daily maximum °C (°F)	10.3 (50.5)	10.0 (50.0)	12.3 (54.1)	16.1 (61.0)	21.9 (71.4)	26.9 (80.4)	29.2 (84.6)	29.3 (84.7)	25.9 (78.6)	21.6 (70.9)	16.2 (61.2)	12.4 (54.3)	19.3 (66.7)
Daily mean °C (°F)	7.9 (46.2)	7.5 (45.5)	9.6 (49.3)	13.5 (56.3)	19.2 (66.6)	24.2 (75.6)	26.6 (79.9)	26.5 (79.7)	23.3 (73.9)	18.8 (65.8)	13.6 (56.5)	9.9 (49.8)	16.7 (62.1)
Mean daily minimum °C (°F)	5.6 (42.1)	5.4 (41.7)	7.7 (45.9)	11.6 (52.9)	17.0 (62.6)	21.5 (70.7)	23.7 (74.7)	23.7 (74.7)	20.6 (69.1)	16.3 (61.3)	11.2 (52.2)	7.6 (45.7)	14.3 (57.7)
Record low °C (°F)	−7 (19)	−4.6 (23.7)	−4 (25)	−1 (30)	6 (43)	10 (50)	15 (59)	16 (61)	11 (52)	6.6 (43.9)	−2.0 (28.4)	−4 (25)	−7 (19)
Average precipitation mm (inches)	151.8 (5.98)	115.0 (4.53)	89.8 (3.54)	62.4 (2.46)	31.5 (1.24)	44.1 (1.74)	50.0 (1.97)	108.0 (4.25)	277.8 (10.94)	288.0 (11.34)	301.3 (11.86)	194.1 (7.64)	1,713.8 (67.47)
Average precipitation days (≥ 1.0 mm)	10.4	10.0	9.6	7.3	5.2	3.6	4.0	6.1	10.2	11.7	13.3	11.0	102.4
Average relative humidity (%)	86	87	87	85	83	78	76	78	83	86	86	86	83.4
Average dew point °C (°F)	5.4 (41.7)	5.2 (41.4)	7.4 (45.3)	11.0 (51.8)	16.3 (61.3)	19.9 (67.8)	21.8 (71.2)	22.3 (72.1)	20.1 (68.2)	16.3 (61.3)	11.2 (52.2)	7.4 (45.3)	13.7 (56.6)
Mean monthly sunshine hours	97	92	111	140	215	266	266	245	167	137	96	88	1,920
Source 1: NOAA NCEI
Source 2: Synoptic Stations Statistics, meteomanz (extremes since 2011)

Climate data for Bandar-e Anzali (1951-2010 normals extremes since 1951)
Month	Jan	Feb	Mar	Apr	May	Jun	Jul	Aug	Sep	Oct	Nov	Dec	Year
Record high °C (°F)	29 (84)	31 (88)	33 (91)	36 (97)	36.8 (98.2)	36.3 (97.3)	37 (99)	36 (97)	35.3 (95.5)	37 (99)	34 (93)	31 (88)	37 (99)
Mean daily maximum °C (°F)	10.1 (50.2)	9.7 (49.5)	11.4 (52.5)	16.1 (61.0)	21.7 (71.1)	26.7 (80.1)	29.4 (84.9)	29.2 (84.6)	25.8 (78.4)	21.3 (70.3)	16.5 (61.7)	12.6 (54.7)	19.2 (66.6)
Daily mean °C (°F)	7.3 (45.1)	7.1 (44.8)	8.9 (48.0)	13.5 (56.3)	18.8 (65.8)	23.4 (74.1)	26.0 (78.8)	25.8 (78.4)	22.6 (72.7)	18.3 (64.9)	13.6 (56.5)	9.7 (49.5)	16.3 (61.2)
Mean daily minimum °C (°F)	4.5 (40.1)	4.5 (40.1)	6.5 (43.7)	10.8 (51.4)	15.9 (60.6)	20.2 (68.4)	22.5 (72.5)	22.3 (72.1)	19.5 (67.1)	15.3 (59.5)	10.6 (51.1)	6.8 (44.2)	13.3 (55.9)
Record low °C (°F)	−7 (19)	−4.6 (23.7)	−4 (25)	−1 (30)	6 (43)	10 (50)	15 (59)	16 (61)	11 (52)	6.6 (43.9)	−2.0 (28.4)	−4 (25)	−7 (19)
Average precipitation mm (inches)	167.8 (6.61)	120.2 (4.73)	110.7 (4.36)	60.2 (2.37)	46.7 (1.84)	52.0 (2.05)	46.0 (1.81)	111.9 (4.41)	271.5 (10.69)	326.0 (12.83)	300.2 (11.82)	217.3 (8.56)	1,830.5 (72.08)
Average precipitation days	14.3	13.1	15.1	12.8	11.6	7.2	6.3	9.3	13.5	15.4	14.6	14.1	147.3
Average relative humidity (%)	86	86	88	86	83	79	76	79	85	87	87	86	84
Average dew point °C (°F)	4.7 (40.5)	4.5 (40.1)	6.5 (43.7)	10.7 (51.3)	15.6 (60.1)	19.2 (66.6)	21.3 (70.3)	21.7 (71.1)	19.6 (67.3)	15.7 (60.3)	11.1 (52.0)	7.0 (44.6)	13.1 (55.7)
Mean monthly sunshine hours	91.3	88.3	96.7	134.5	200.8	248.5	257.4	217.4	161.6	124.0	101.1	90.8	1,812.4
Source 1: Synoptic Stations Statistics(sun 1962-2010, dew point 1951-2005)
Source 2: meteomanz (extremes since 2011)

== Economy ==
Historically Anzalis were mostly involved in the fish trade. Rice farming and agriculture are the other traditional jobs in Anzali, and are practiced in the villages surrounding the city.

=== Caviar ===
Bandar-e Anzali is a center of caviar production. The preparation and marketing of which is a state monopoly, handled through the Iranian Fishing Company under the control of the Finance Ministry. The public is not admitted to the immense refrigerated hangars where tons of sturgeons, some as large as 3 meters long and weighing 100 kilograms, are stored after the removal of the caviar, usually equivalent to about one tenth of their weight.

== Gallery ==
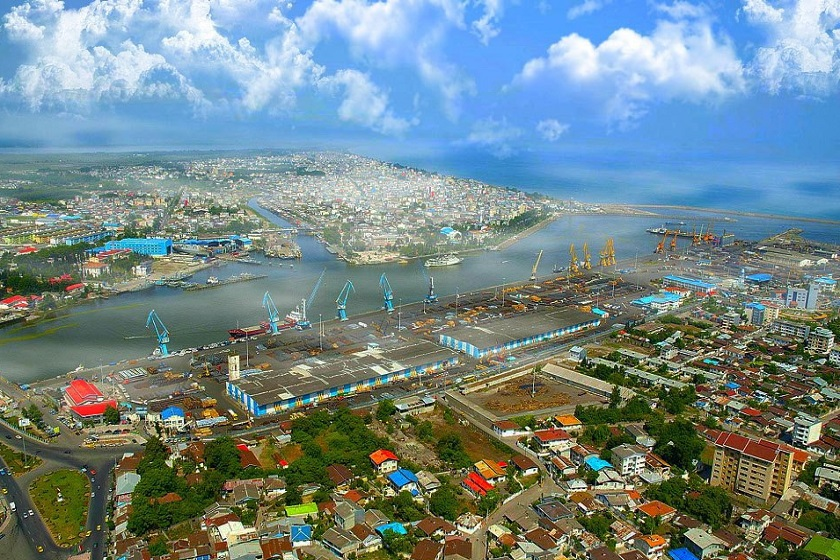

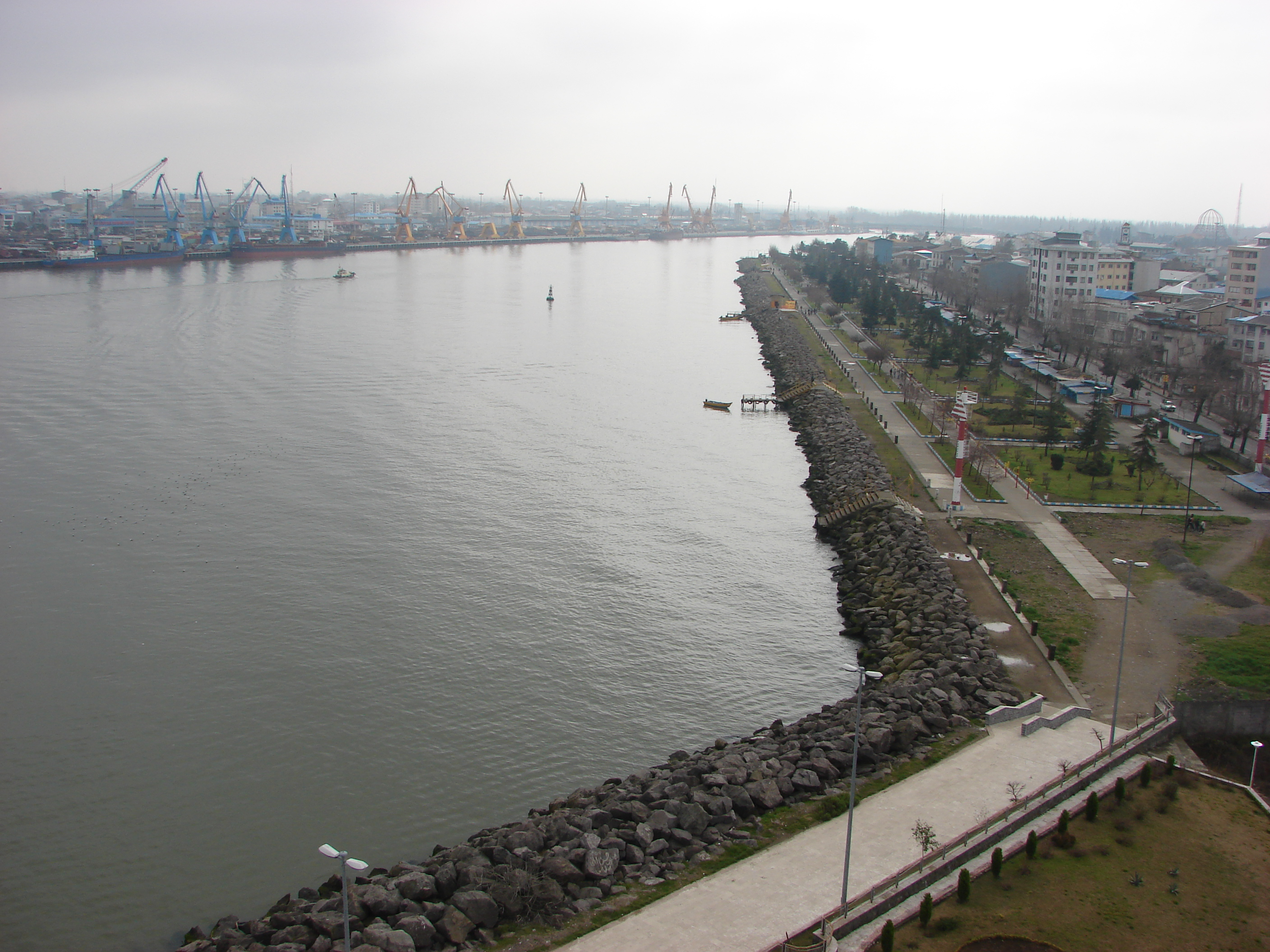
Bandar-e Anzali Blvd.

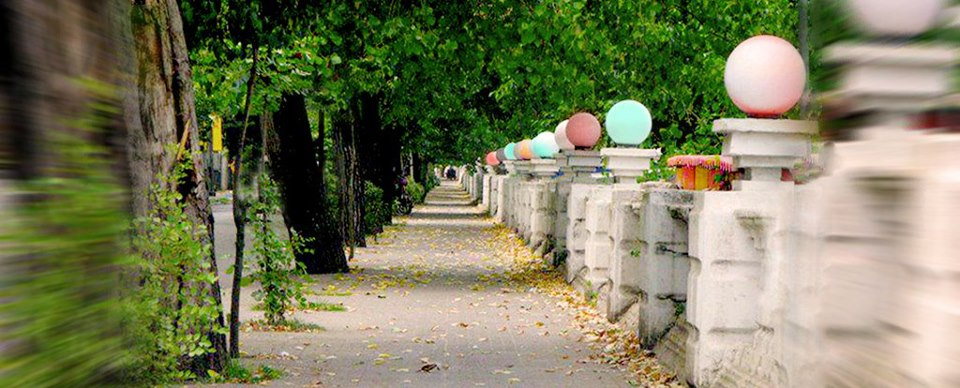
A walkway in Anzali

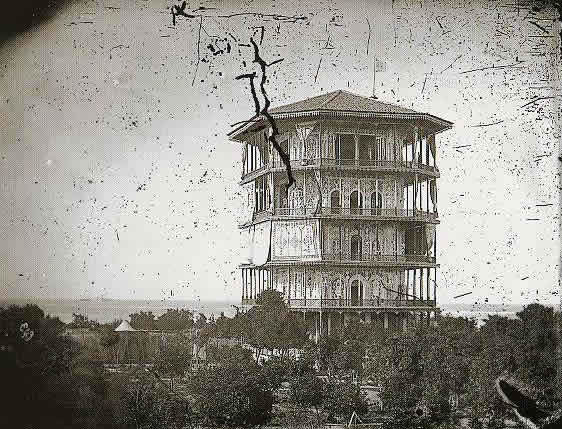
Destructed pavilion of Anzali

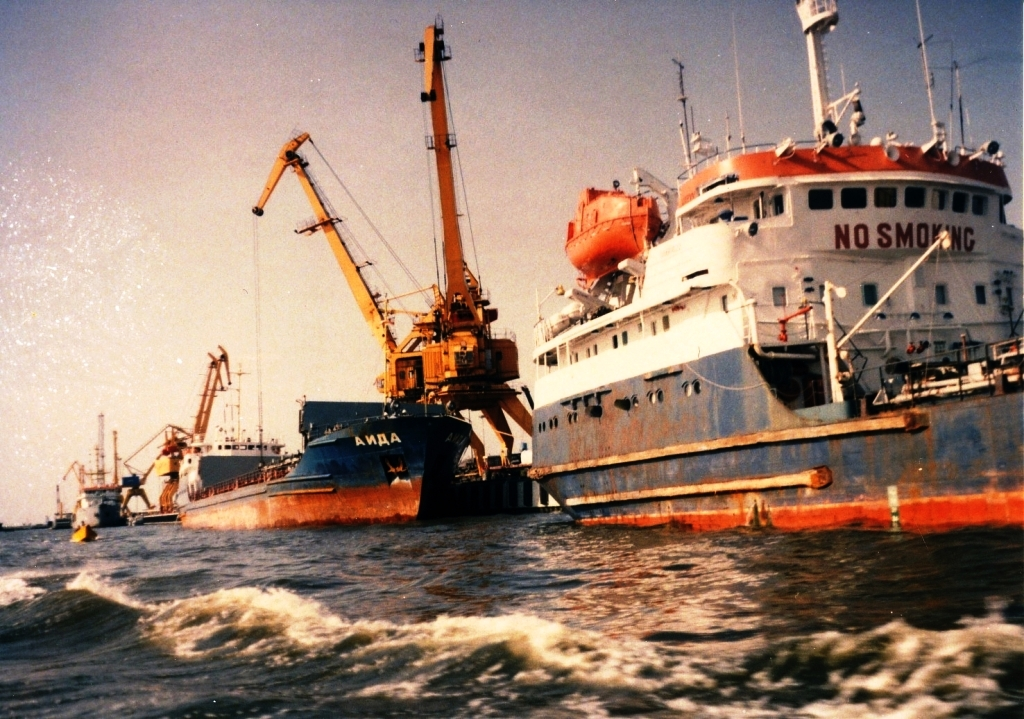
Russian ships docking in Bandar-e Anzali harbour

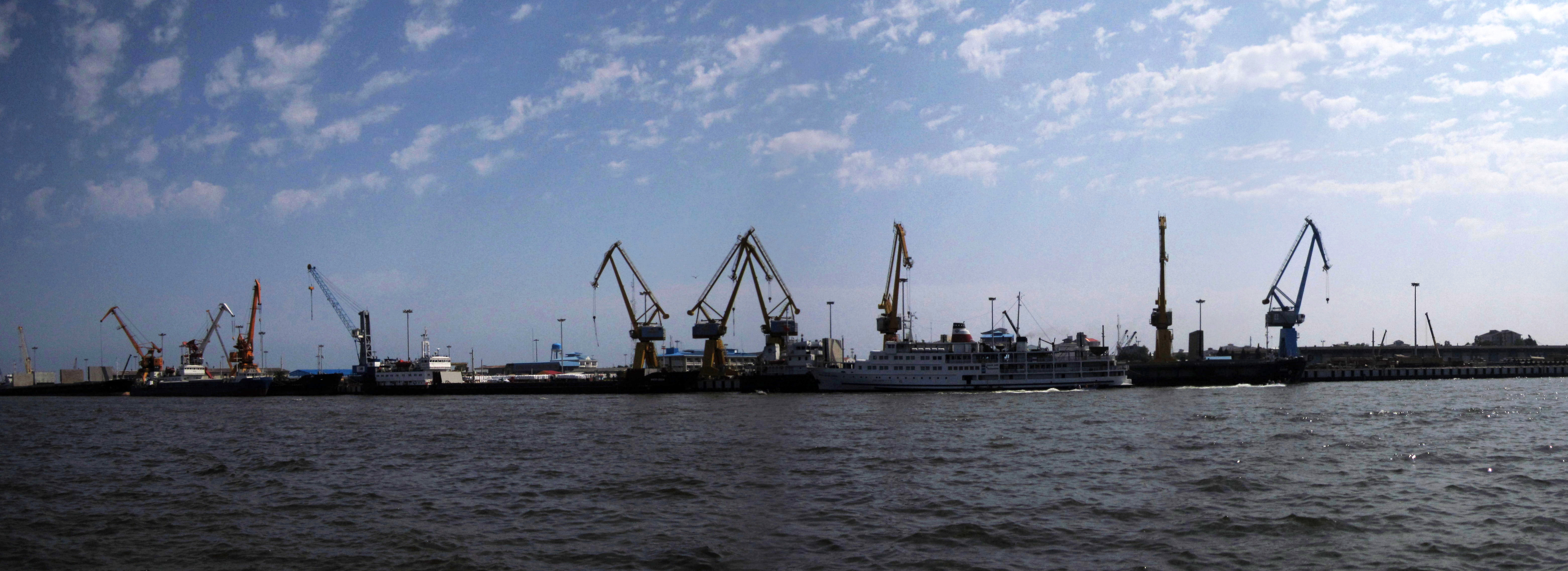
The harbour of Bandar-e Anzali

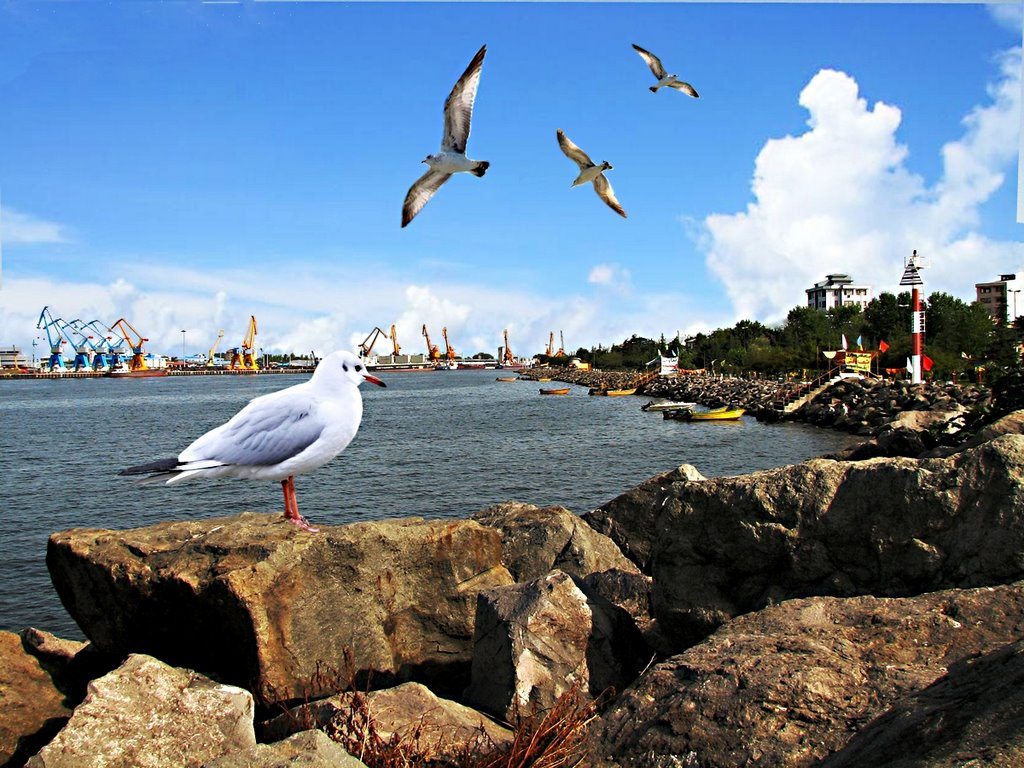
Coast of Bandar-e Anzali

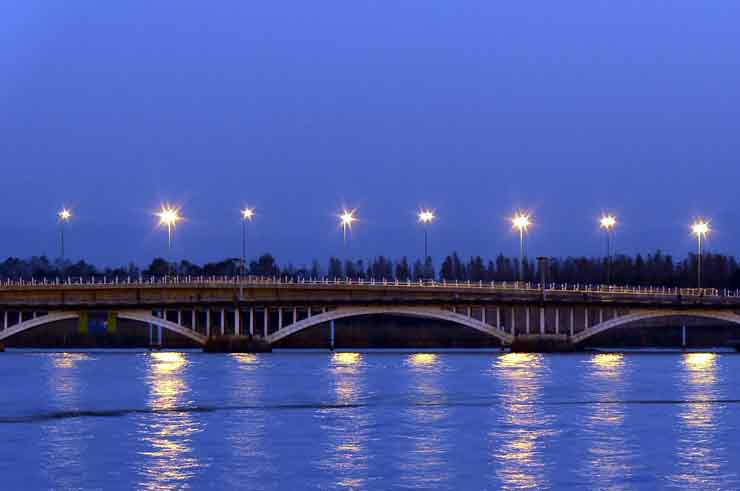

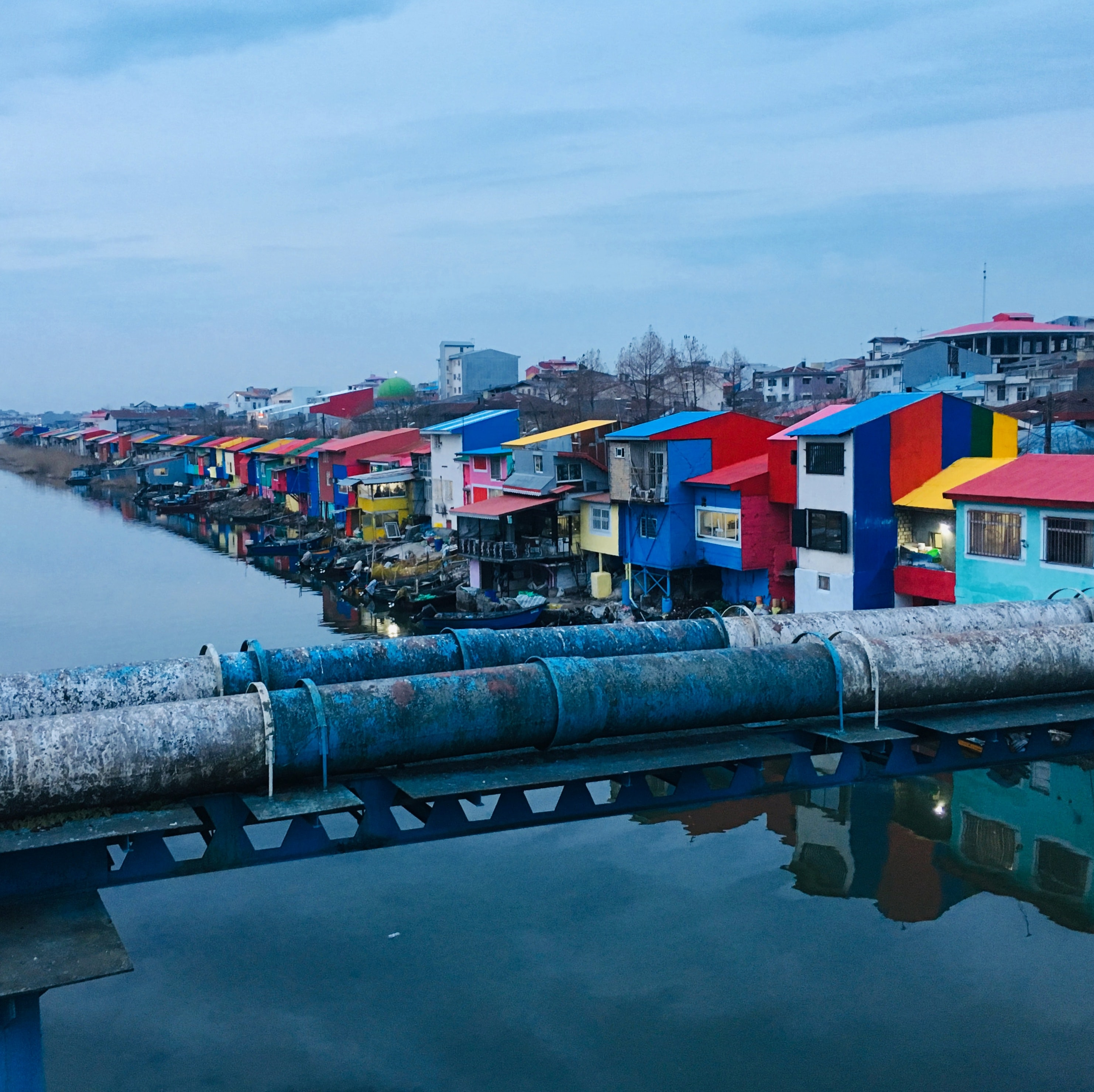
Colorful houses in Anzali

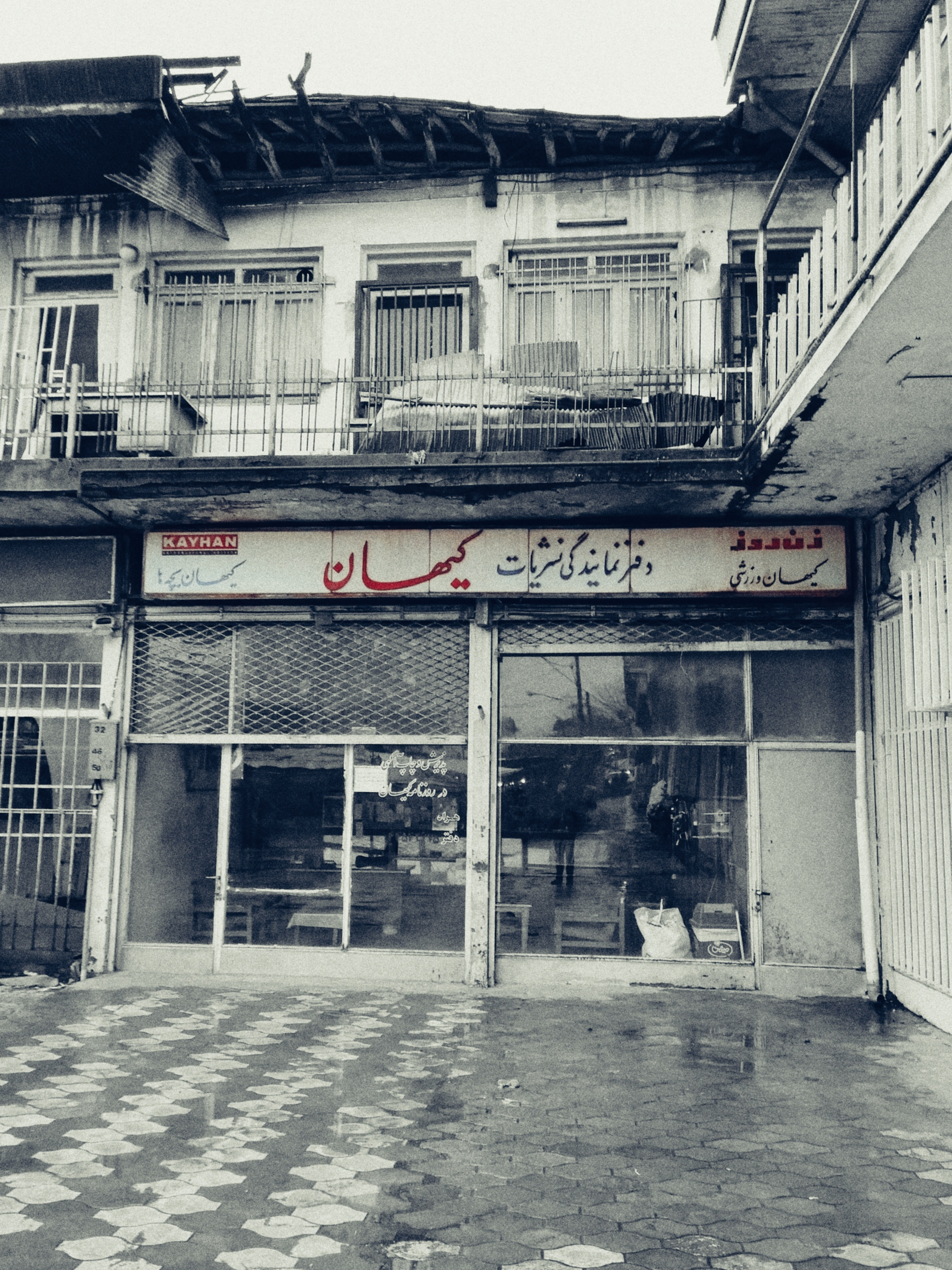
The first newspaper agency in Anzali

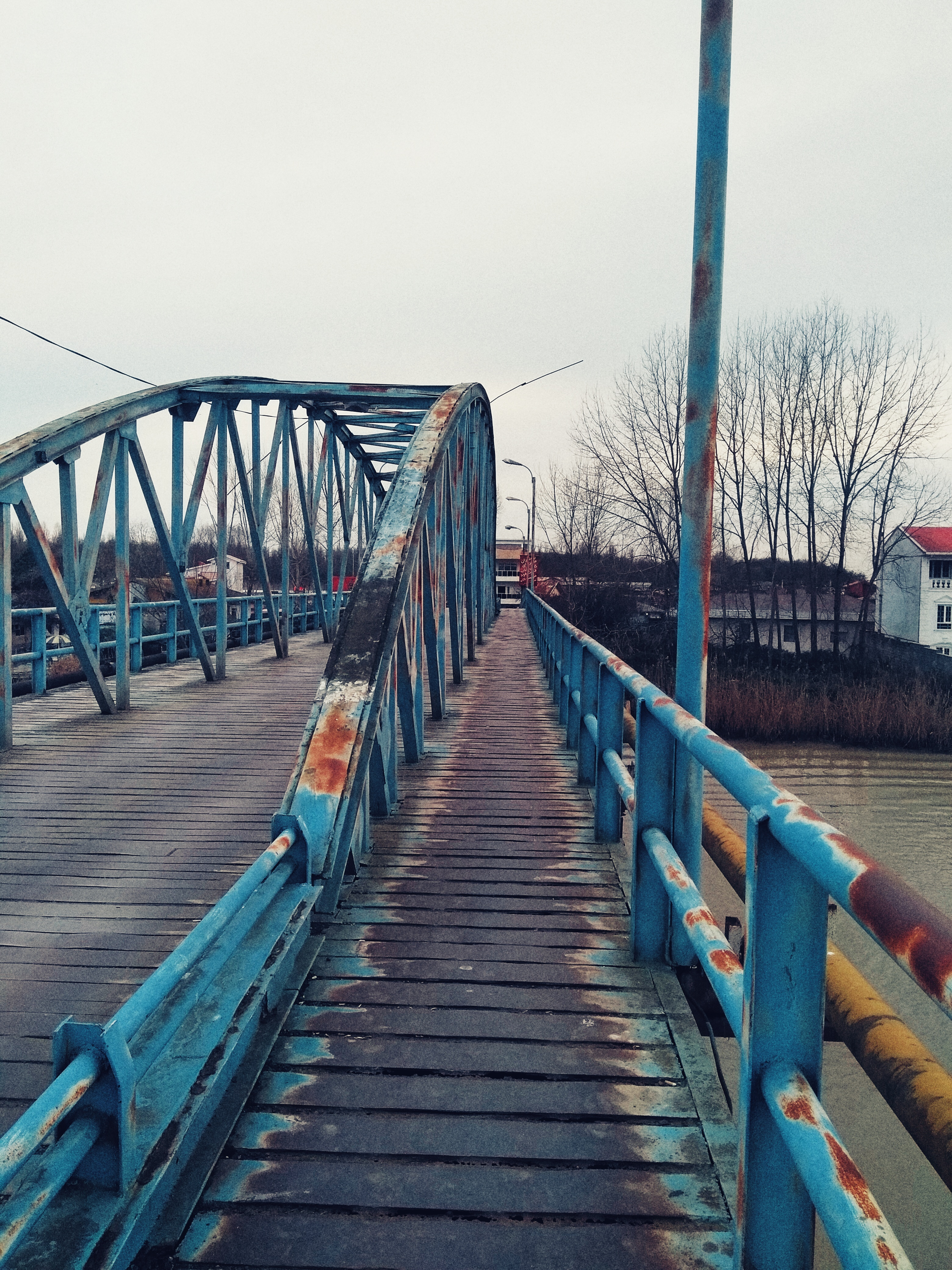
GhalamGoodeh Bridge in Anzali

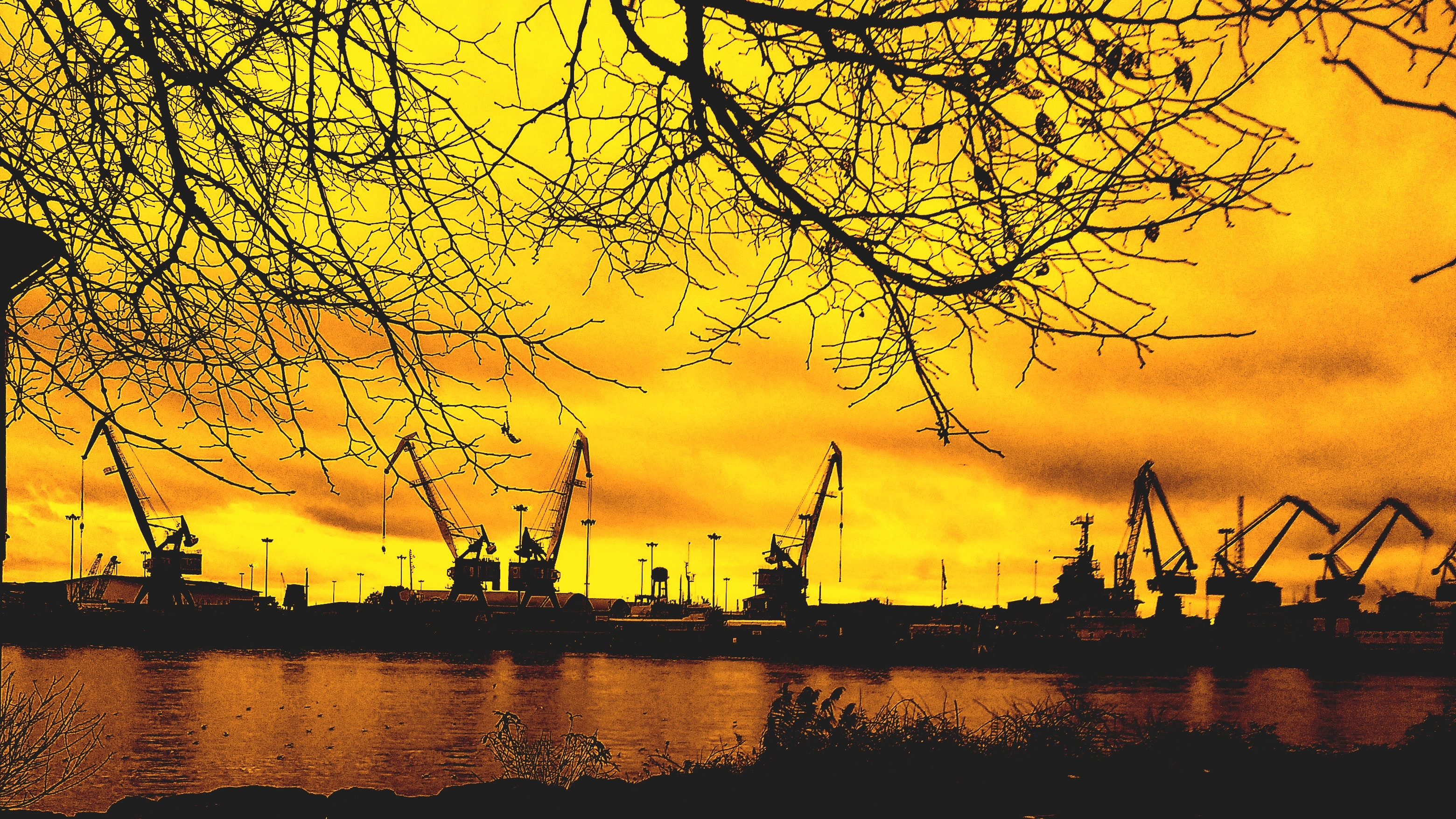
Anzali port docks
