= Bandar-e Anzali County =

County in Gilan province, Iran

Bandar-e Anzali County Persian: شهرستان بندر انزلی
- County
- Location of Bandar-e Anzali County in Gilan province (top center, green)

- Location of Gilan province in Iran
- Coordinates: 37°29′N 49°27′E
- Country: Iran
- Province: Gilan
- Capital: Bandar-e Anzali
- Districts: Central

Population (2016)
  - Total: 139,016
- Time zone: UTC+3:30 (IRST)

Bandar-e Anzali County (Persian: شهرستان بندر انزلی) (Note: Formerly Bandar-e Pahlavi County (شهرستان بندر پهلوی)) is in Gilan province, in northwestern Iran. Its capital is the city of Bandar-e Anzali. (Note: Formerly Bandar-e Pahlavi)

Bandar Anzali County is bordered by the Caspian Sea on the north, Sowme'eh Sara County on the south, Khomam County on the east, Rasht County on the southeast, and Rezvanshahr County on the west.

== Demographics ==
=== Population ===
At the time of the 2006 National Census, the county's population was 130,851 in 38,810 households. The following census in 2011 counted 138,004 people in 45,080 households. The 2016 census measured the population of the county as 139,016 in 48,193 households.

=== Administrative divisions ===
Bandar-e Anzali County's population history and administrative structure over three consecutive censuses are shown in the following table.

Bandar-e Anzali County Population
Administrative Divisions	2006	2011	2016
Central District	130,851	138,001	139,015
Chahar Farizeh RD	13,829	12,960	12,207
Licharaki-ye Hasan Rud RD	7,335	8,377	8,244
Bandar-e Anzali (city)	109,687	116,664	118,564
Total	130,851	138,004	139,016
RD = Rural District

== See also ==
Media related to Bandar-e Anzali County at Wikimedia Commons
