= Central District (Bandar-e Anzali County) =

District in Gilan province, Iran

Central District (Bandar-e Anzali County) Persian: بخش مرکزی شهرستان بندر انزلی
- District
- Location within Iran
- Coordinates: 37°29′N 49°27′E
- Country: Iran
- Province: Gilan
- County: Bandar-e Anzali
- Capital: Bandar-e Anzali

Population (2016)
  - Total: 139,015
- Time zone: UTC+3:30 (IRST)

The Central District of Bandar-e Anzali County (Persian: بخش مرکزی شهرستان بندر انزلی) (Note: Formerly Bandar-e Pahlavi County) is in Gilan province, in northwestern Iran. Its capital is the city of Bandar-e Anzali. (Note: Formerly Bandar-e Pahlavi)

== Demographics ==
=== Population ===
At the time of the 2006 National Census, the district's population was 130,851 in 38,810 households. The following census in 2011 counted 138,001 people in 45,096 households. The 2016 census measured the population of the district as 139,015 inhabitants in 48,192 households.

=== Administrative divisions ===
Central District (Bandar-e Anzali County) Population
Administrative Divisions	2006	2011	2016
Chahar Farizeh RD	13,829	12,960	12,207
Licharaki-ye Hasan Rud RD	7,335	8,377	8,244
Bandar-e Anzali (city)	109,687	116,664	118,564
Total	130,851	138,001	139,015
RD = Rural District
