= Imam Maturidi International Scientific Research Center =

Uzbek research center

- Imom Moturidiy xalqaro ilmiy-tadqiqot markazi
- Established: August 11, 2020; 6 years ago
- Founder: Shavkat Mirziyoyev
- Purpose: Maturidi scholars and their works
- Headquarters: Tashkent, Uzbekistan
- Region served: Uzbekistan
- Fields: Maturidi theology, Islamic studies
- Official languages: Uzbek, Arabic, English, and Russian
- Key people: Dr. Davron Makhsudov, Director of Imam Maturidi International Scientific Research Center; Dr. Muzaffar Komilov, President of the International Islamic Academy of Uzbekistan
- Main organ: International Islamic Academy of Uzbekistan (IIAU)
- Parent organization: Imam Bukhari International Scientific Research Center; Imam Termizi International Research Center
- Website: moturidiy.uz

Imam Maturidi International Scientific Research Center (Uzbek: Imom Moturidiy xalqaro ilmiy-tadqiqot markazi; Arabic: مركز الإمام الماتريدي الدولي للبحوث العلمية) is an Islamic research center dedicated to the renewal of Maturidi thought in 'aqidah. It was established by the initiative of the president of Uzbekistan Shavkat Mirziyoyev on August 11, 2020.

== Departments ==
- Department of Research on Maturidiyya Studies.
- Department of Modern Islamic Studies.
- Department of Translations.
- Department of Publications.
- Department of International Relations.
- Information Resource Center.

== Focus ==
The center focuses on in-depth study of the scientific heritage of Imam Abu Mansur al-Maturidi, and the contribution of Maturidi scholars, such as Abu al-Mu'in al-Nasafi to the study of Kalam. Other efforts include general education about Islam, as well as combating ignorance, religious fanaticism, and extremism.

== Symposiums and conferences ==
The first online scientific symposium of the Imam Maturidi International Scientific Research Center under the International Islamic Academy of Uzbekistan was held on March 17, 2021. The second symposium was organized by the two institutions, in cooperation with IRCICA, on 26 May 2022.

== See also ==
- 2020 International Maturidi Conference
- Tashkent State University of Oriental Studies
- Imam Maturidi Application and Research Center at Selçuk University
- Research Centre for Islamic History, Art and Culture
- International Islamic University Malaysia
- Darul Uloom Deoband

== Sources ==
=== Arabic ===
- "برعاية الرئيس الأوزبكي.. إنشاء مركز "الماتريدي للبحوث العلمية"". asiaelyoum.com (in Arabic).
- "د. دوران مقصودوف يكتب: مركز الإمام الماتريدي الدولي يستهدف دراسة تراثه ونشره بين الشباب". nile1.com (in Arabic). 4 February 2021.
- "بدء أعمال الهيئة العلمية مركز الإمام الماتريدي الدولي للبحوث العلمية لدى أكاديمية أوزبكستان الإسلامية". alkhabaralyoum.com (in Arabic).
- "خلال مشاركته في الملتقى الدوليّ بمناسبة افتتاح مركز الإمام الماتريدي.. أمين "البحوث الإسلامية": منهج الاعتدال والوسطية داعم رئيس لبناء الحضارة الإسلامية بشكل خاص والإنسانية بشكل عام". azhar.eg (in Arabic). Islamic Research Academy at al-Azhar.

=== Russian ===
- "Центр Имама Матуриди в Ташкенте и позитивный потенциал традиционного понимания Ислама". materik.ru (in Russian). 2 June 2021.

=== Turkish ===
- Prof. Dr. Sönmez Kutlu (20 August 2020). "İMAM MATURİDİ İLMİ ARAŞTIRMALAR MERKEZİ VE İSLAM MEDENİYETİNİN YENİDEN İNŞASI". bilgipedia.com.tr (in Turkish).

=== Uzbek ===
- "O'zbekistonda Imom Moturidiy xalqaro ilmiy-tadqiqot markazi tashkil etiladi". perepost.uz (in Uzbek).
- "Imom Moturidiy xalqaro ilmiy-tadqiqot markazini tashkil etish chora-tadbirlari toʻgʻrisida". kknews.uz (in Uzbek).
- "Prezident qarori bilan Imom Moturidiy xalqaro ilmiy-tadqiqot markazi tashkil etildi". qalampir.uz (in Uzbek).
- "Imom Moturidiy xalqaro ilmiy-tadqiqot markazi tashkil etildi". yuz.uz (in Uzbek).
