= Tharwat el-Kherbawy =

Tharwat el-Kherbawy ثروت الخرباوي
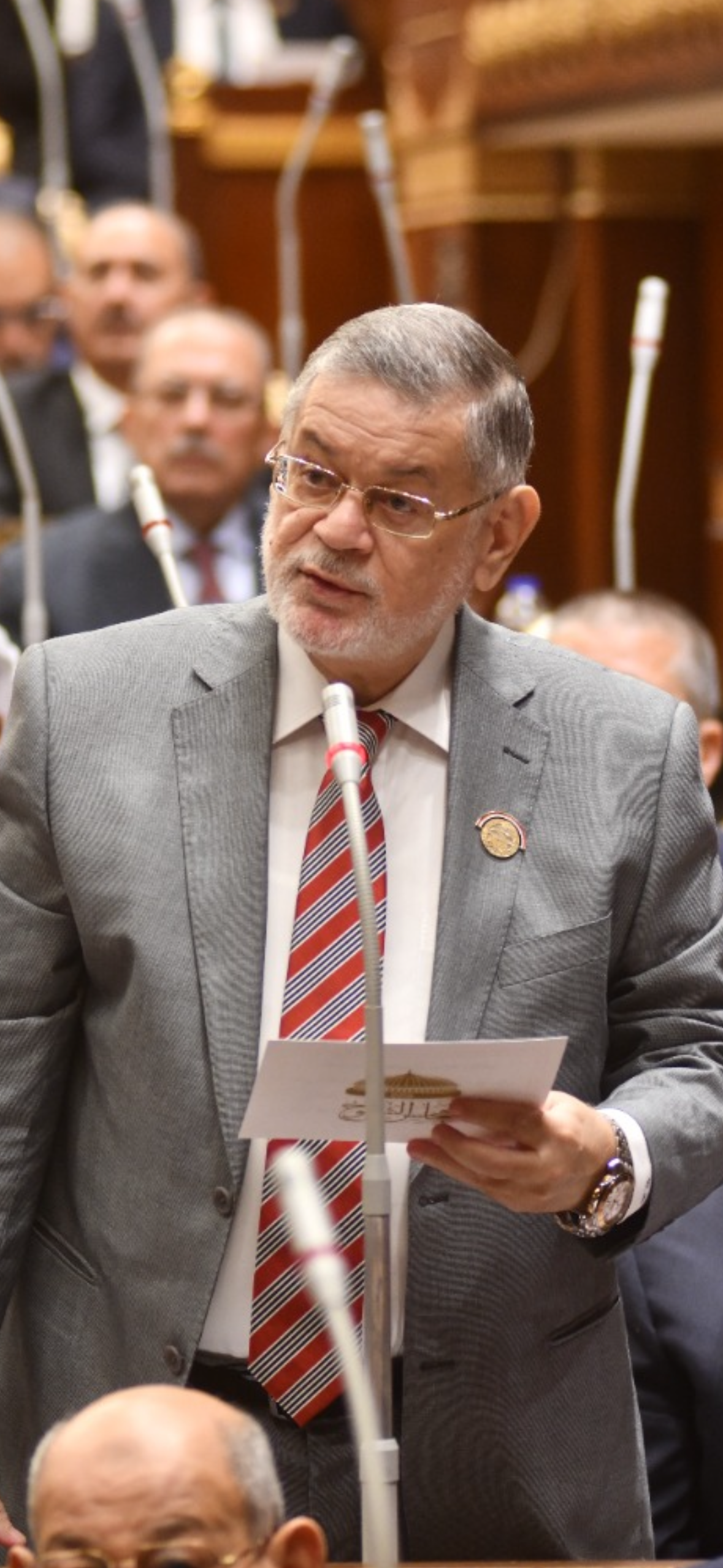
- Born: 1957 (age 68–69); Sharqiyya Governorate, Egypt
- Occupations: Senator at the Egyptian Senate, Lawyer, writer, journalist and politician
- Notable work: The Heart of the Brotherhood; The Secret of the Temple

Tharwat el-Kherbawy (Arabic: ثروت الخرباوي) is a Senator at the Egyptian Senate, lawyer and dissident former leader of the Muslim Brotherhood who is known for his anti-Brotherhood views, and present-day political thinker, and researcher on Islamist groups.

He left the Brotherhood in 2002, critical of its use of Islam to justify its political activism.

== Books ==
Among his well-known writings are:

- Qalb al-Ikhwan: Mahakem Tafteesh al-Jama'a (Arabic: قلب الإخوان: محاكم تفتيش الجماعة, lit. 'The Heart of the Brotherhood: the Group's Courts of Inquisition').

Lo MbAye states that Al-Kherbawy's book Qalb al-Ikhwan (The Heart of the Brotherhood or Inside the Brotherhood) "unveils the mysterious inner workings of the organization, how decisions are made and how ideological discipline is enforced through strict adherence to the chains of command", and praises the book's "clear and poignant prose".

- Sir al-Ma'bad: al-Asrar al-Khafiyya li-Jama'at al-Ikhwan al-Muslimin (Arabic: سر المعبد: الأسرار الخفية لجماعة الإخوان المسلمين, lit. 'The Secret of the Temple: the Hidden Secrets of the Muslim Brotherhood'). This book won Best Political Book at the Cairo International Book Fair.

== See also ==
- Mohammed Habib
- Ahmad Karima
