= Al-Azhar al-Sharif =

Islamic scientific body in Egypt

- الأزهر الشريف
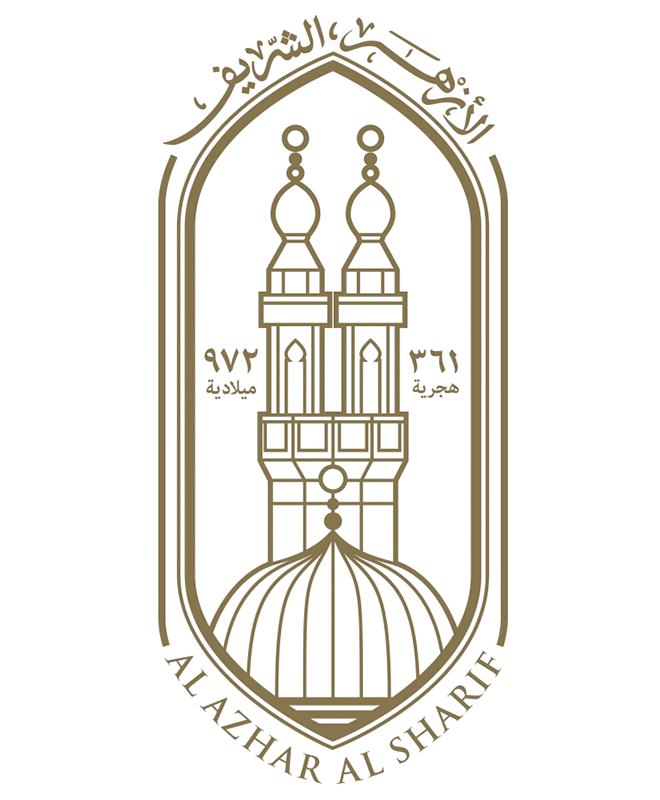
- Logo

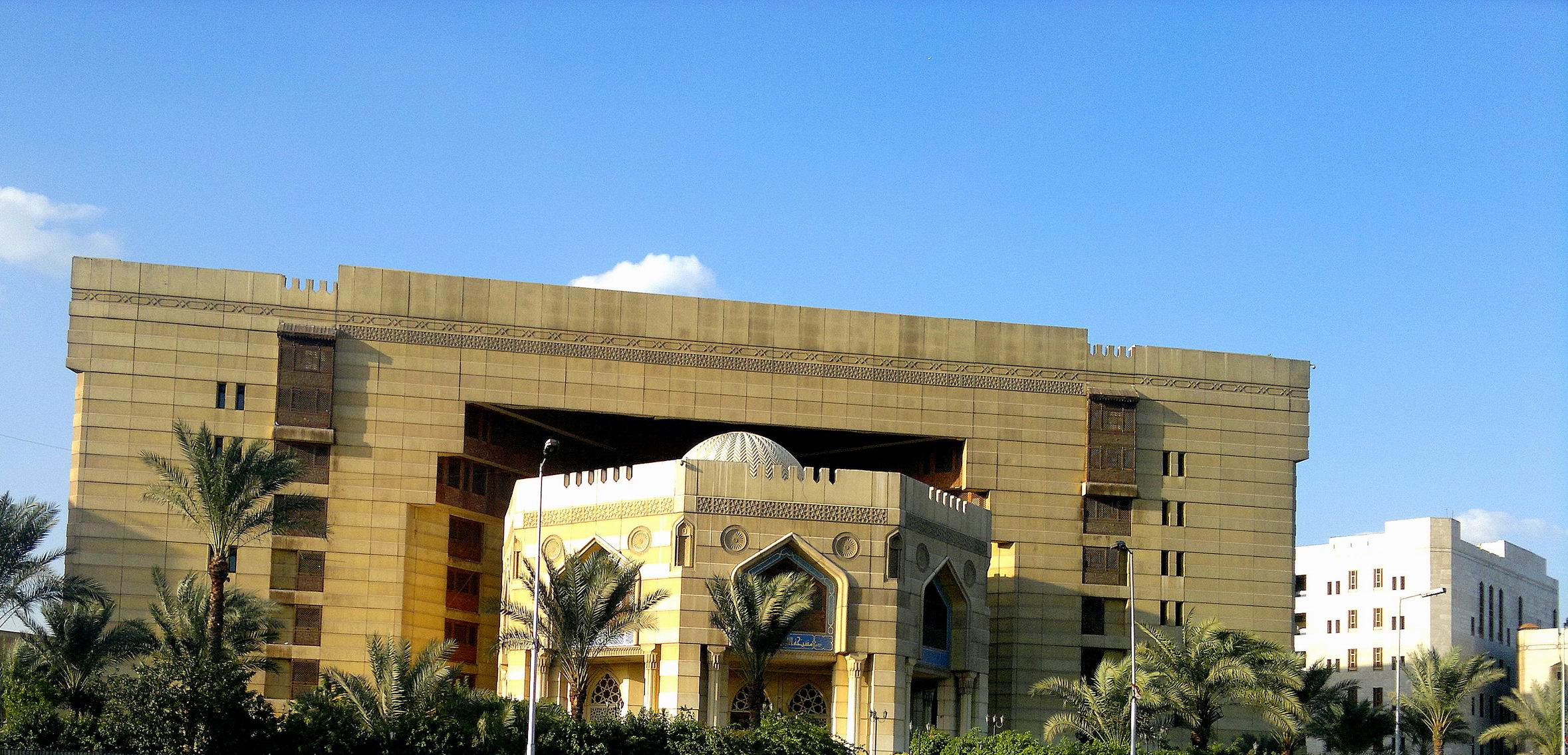
- Al-Azhar al-Sharif building
- Formation: 971
- Legal status: Organizations
- Headquarters: Cairo, Egypt
- Official language: Arabic
- Grand Imam of al-Azhar: Ahmed el-Tayeb
- The Deputy of Al-Azhar: Ayman Abdel Ghani
- Budget: 19.9 Billion EGP
- Website: www.azhar.eg/en

Al-Azhar al-Sharif (Arabic: الأزهر الشريف, romanized: al-Azhar al-Sharīf) is an Islamic scientific body and the largest religious institution in Egypt. Its headquarters is located in the building of the Sheikhdom of Al-Azhar in the center of the Egyptian capital, Cairo. The history of the establishment of the Al-Azhar Mosque dates back to the year 970 by the Fatimid Caliph Al-Muizz Li-Din Allah.

The Al-Azhar institution in its current form was reorganized according to Law No. 10 of 1911, amended by Law No. 32 and 33 of 1923, and then Law No. 103 of 1961, which stipulated that Al-Azhar is the major Islamic scientific body based on the preservation and study of Islamic heritage, and it has an independent moral personality, headed by it. It is led by the Grand Imam of al-Azhar, currently Ahmed el-Tayeb, and consists of several basic bodies.

== Affiliated bodies ==
- Al-Azhar Senior Scholars Authority
- The Supreme Council of Al-Azhar
- Islamic Research Academy
- Al-Azhar Mosque
- Al-Azhar University
- City of Islamic Resurrections
- Azhar institutes
- Al-Azhar Library
- Al-Azhar Observatory for Combating Extremism.

== Grand Imam of al-Azhar ==
The Grand Imam of al-Azhar is a prestigious and a prominent official title in Egypt. He is considered by some Muslims to be the highest authority in Sunni Islamic thought and Islamic jurisprudence and holds great influence on followers of the theological Ash'ari and Maturidi traditions worldwide. The Grand Imam heads the Al-Azhar Al Sharif, al-Azhar Mosque, and by extension al-Azhar University, and is responsible for official religious matters along with the Grand Mufti of Egypt.

== The Deputy of Al-Azhar ==
The Deputy of Al-Azhar Al-Sharif is the second-in-command in the organizational structure of Al-Azhar Al-Sharif. He assists the Grand Imam and provides direct supervision over the administrative apparatus and the various sectors of the Sheikhdom. His duties involve managing executive and financial affairs, approving Al-Azhar's budget, and providing technical supervision over the Al-Azhar Institutes Sector, including developing curricula and overseeing examinations. He also plays a legal role through his membership in the Supreme Council of Al-Azhar and participation in drafting governing regulations, in addition to representing the institution in official forums and through delegations from the Grand Imam to ensure the implementation of Al-Azhar's general policies in both advocacy and education.

== Religious ideology ==
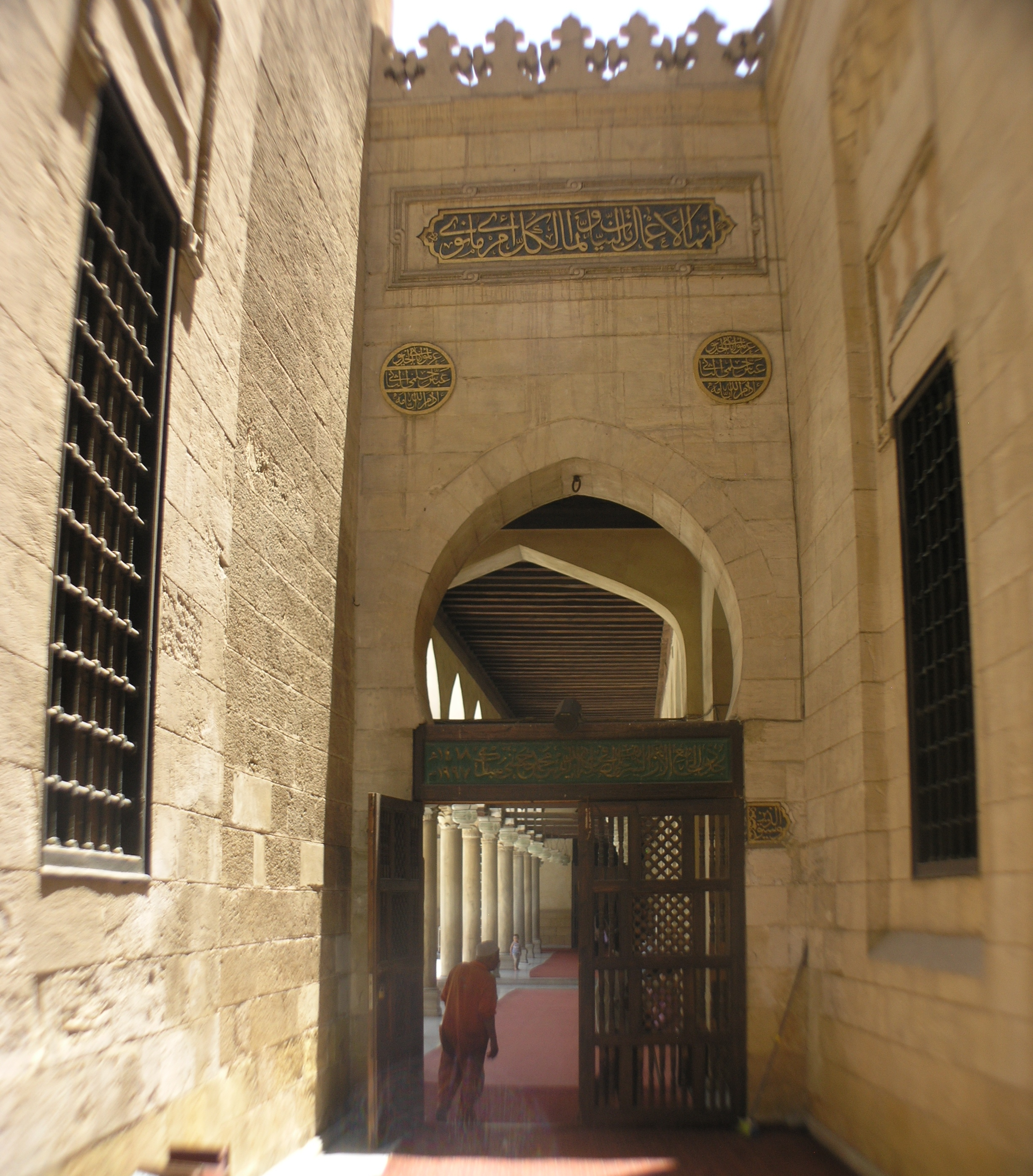
Gateway

Historically, Al-Azhar had a membership that represented diverse opinions within Islam. It has a long tradition of teaching all four schools of Sunni Islamic jurisprudence (Hanafi, Maliki, Shafi, and Hanbali). The chief mufti of each school of thought acted as the dean, responsible for the teachers and students in that group. During the time of the Ottomans, the Hanafi dean came to hold a position as primus inter pares. It also had membership from the seven main Sufi orders. Al-Azhar has had an antagonistic relationship with Wahhabism. According to a 2011 report issued by the Carnegie Endowment for International Peace, Al Azhar is strongly Sufi in character:

Adherence to a Sufi order has long been standard for both professors and students in the al-Azhar mosque and university system. Although al-Azhar is not monolithic, its identity has been strongly associated with Sufism. The current Shaykh al-Azhar (rector of the school), Ahmed el-Tayeb, is a hereditary Sufi shaykh from Upper Egypt who has recently expressed his support for the formation of a world Sufi league; the former Grand Mufti of Egypt and senior al-Azhar scholar Ali Gomaa is also a highly respected Sufi master.

However, in the early 20th century, enlightened Modernist thinkers such as Muhammad Abduh led a reform of the curriculum, reintroducing a desire for legal reform through ijtihad. Subsequently, disputes were had between modernist intellectuals and traditionalists within al-Azhar. Al-Azhar now maintains a modernist position, advocating "Wasatiyya" (centrism), a reaction against the extreme textualism of many Wahhabi Salafi ideologues. Wasatiyya covers a range of thinkers, some of whom are liberal intellectuals with religious inclinations, preachers such as Yusuf al-Qaradawi and many members of the Muslim Brotherhood since the 2013 coup. Al-Azhar, led by its current Grand Imam Ahmed el-Tayeb—who was appointed by President Mubarak and previously affiliated with his loyalist National Democratic Party—has taken a stance against the Brotherhood.

The nineteenth and current Grand Mufti of Egypt and Al Azhar scholar, is Shawki Ibrahim Abdel-Karim Allam. The university is opposed to overt liberal reform of Islam and issued a fatwa against the liberal Ibn Rushd-Goethe mosque in Berlin because it banned face-covering veils such as burqa and niqab on its premises while allowing women and men to pray together. The fatwa encompassed all present and future liberal mosques.

== Photo gallery ==
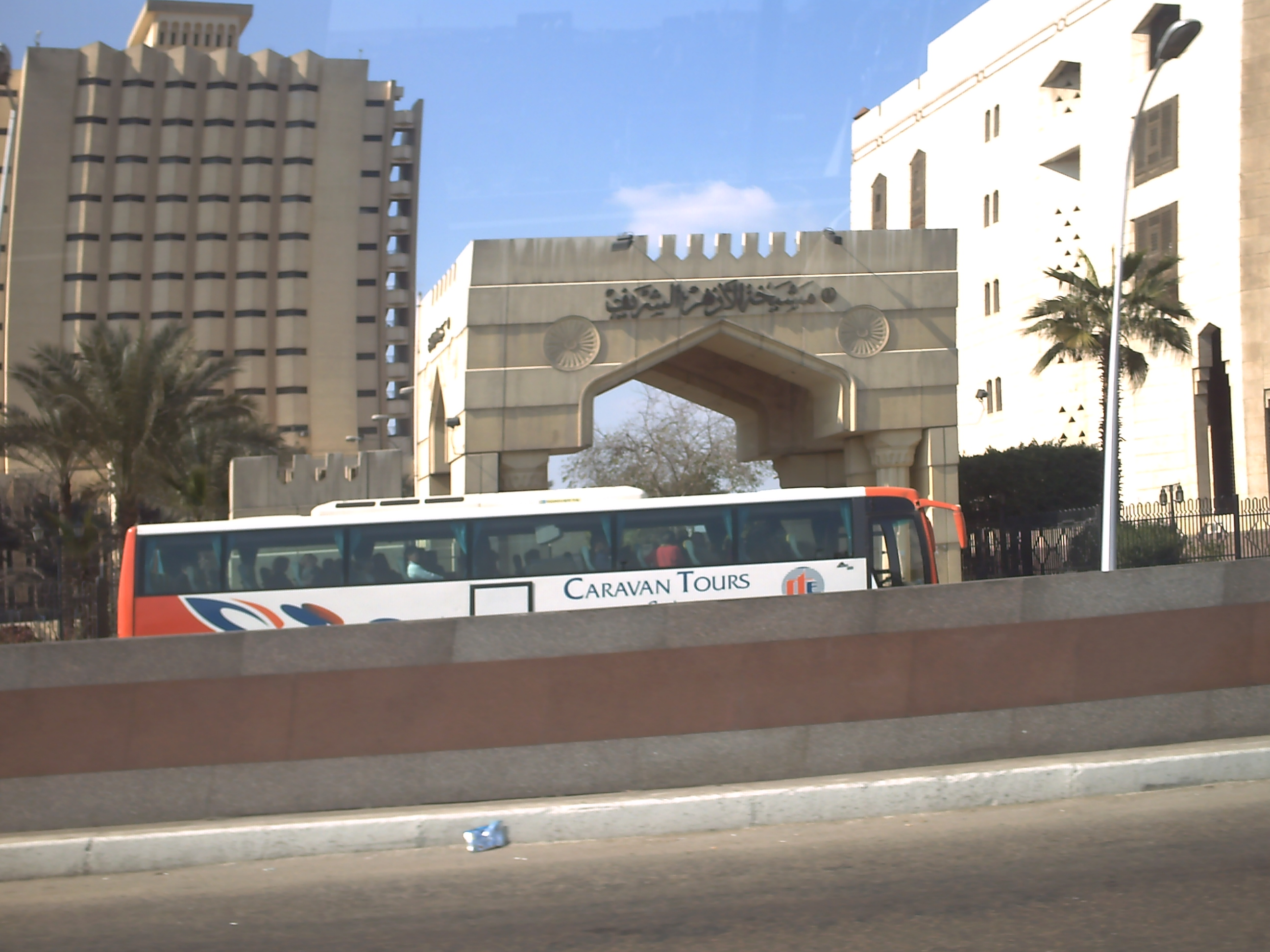
Gate

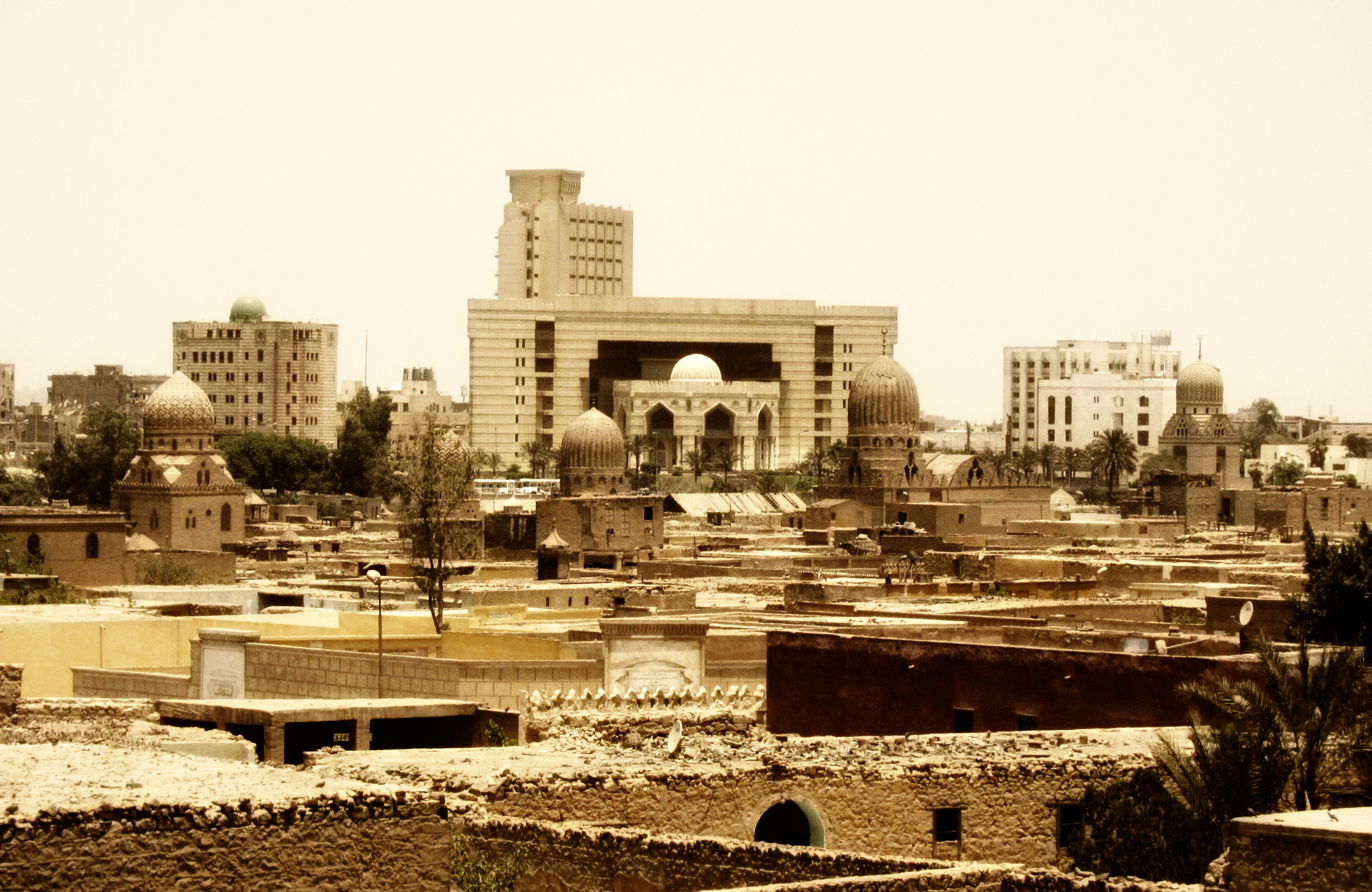
Façade

Al-Azhar Administration building (2008)

== See also ==
- Islam in Egypt
- Organisation of Islamic Cooperation
