= Ahmed el-Tayeb =

Egyptian Islamic scholar (born 1946)

The Grand Imam Ahmed El-Tayeb
- أحمد الطيب
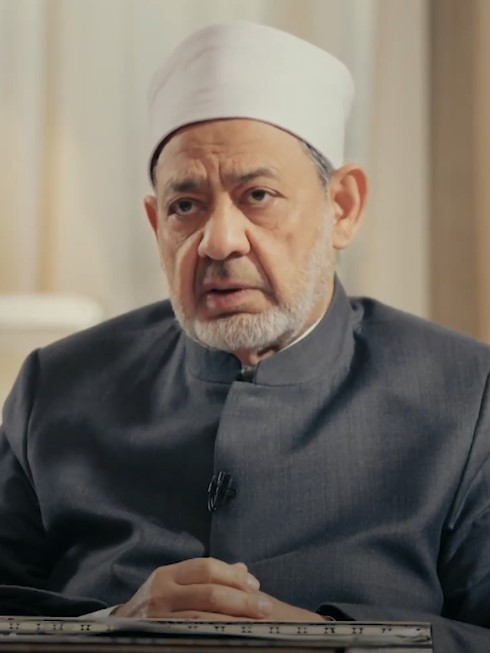
- El-Tayeb in 2025

Grand Imam of al-Azhar & Al-Azhar Al Sharif
- Incumbent
- Assumed office 10 March 2010
- President: Hosni Mubarak; Mohamed Hussein Tantawy (acting); Mohamed Morsi; Adly Mansour (acting); Abdel Fattah el-Sisi
- Preceded by: Mohamed Sayed Tantawy

Grand Mufti of Egypt
- In office 10 March 2002 – 27 September 2003
- President: Hosni Mubarak
- Preceded by: Nasr Farid Wasil
- Succeeded by: Ali Gomaa

President of Al-Azhar University
- In office 2003–2010
- President: Hosni Mubarak
- Preceded by: Ahmad Omar Hashem
- Succeeded by: Abdallah al-Husseini

Personal life
- Born: Ahmed Mohamed Ahmed El-Tayeb; 6 January 1946 (age 80) Kurna, Luxor Governorate, Kingdom of Egypt
- Education: Al-Azhar University; Paris-Sorbonne University

Religious life
- Religion: Islam
- Denomination: Sunni
- Jurisprudence: Maliki
- Creed: Ash'ari
- Movement: Sufism

Ahmed Mohamed Ahmed El-Tayeb (Arabic: أحمد محمد أحمد الطيب; born 6 January 1946) is an Egyptian Islamic scholar and the current Grand Imam of al-Azhar, al-Azhar al-Sharif and former president of al-Azhar University. He was appointed by the Egyptian President, Hosni Mubarak, following the death of Mohamed Sayed Tantawy in 2010. He is from Kurna, Luxor Governorate in Upper Egypt, and he belongs to a Sunni Muslim family.

== Early life and education ==
Ahmed Mohamed Ahmed El-Tayeb was born on 6 January 1946 in Kurna, Luxor Governorate, Kingdom of Egypt. El-Tayeb studied Doctrine and Philosophy at Al-Azhar University, where he graduated in 1969, after that he had a master's degree and Ph.D. in Islamic philosophy in 1971 and 1977 respectively. Later on, he went to study at the University of Paris for six months, from December 1977 to 1978. Afterwards, he held academic posts at Al-Azhar University, then administrative roles in Qena and Aswan, and worked at the International Islamic University, Islamabad in Pakistan in 1999–2000.

Between 2002 and 2003, El-Tayeb served as Grand Mufti of Egypt. El-Tayeb is a hereditary Sufi shaykh from Upper Egypt and has expressed support for a global Sufi league. He was president of Al-Azhar University from 2003 until 2010.

== National Democratic Party ==
Prior to his appointment as the Grand Imam of Al-Azhar and president of al-Azhar University, he was a member of Mubarak's National Democratic Party's Policies Committee. He initially refused to resign from his position in the National Democratic Party (NDP) by saying that there was no conflict between his role at Al-Azhar and membership in the party.

In April 2010, he resigned from his post in the party.

== Views ==
=== Muslim Brotherhood ===
In an article published shortly after his appointment as president of Al-Azhar University, he was described as "a regime loyalist and member of Mr. Mubarak's ruling National Democratic Party [who] takes a firm stance against the Muslim Brotherhood".

El-Tayeb was quoted as saying that Al-Azhar University would "never be an open field for the Brotherhood".

The same article reported that the Muslim Brotherhood's leader, Mohammed Badie, had congratulated El-Tayeb on his appointment. At the same time, the Brotherhood senior member, Sheikh Sayed Askar, also an Azharite, accused the government of "promoting one of its own at the expense of people better suited to the post".

Criticism intensified after the 2011 Egyptian Revolution. Some Muslim Brotherhood members accused him of being "a remnant of the ousted Mubarak regime and National Democratic Party".

In 2011, following the Egyptian revolution, the Muslim Brotherhood held a rally at the Al-Azhar mosque to oppose what it described as the Judaization of Jerusalem. He said at the rally that "the al-Aqsa Mosque is currently under an offensive by the Jews" and "we shall not allow the Zionists to Judaize al-Quds [Jerusalem]". He also alleged that Jews around the world were trying to prevent Islamic and Egyptian unity.

He backed the military coup against Egyptian President Mohamed Morsi.

=== Opposition to sectarianism ===
He has strongly rebuked the Sunni anti-Shi'a preaching, which has increased since the Syrian Bashar al-Assad regime cracked down on the Sunni Muslim rebels in the Syrian Civil War.

=== Islamic State of Iraq and the Levant ===
He has strongly condemned the Islamic State of Iraq and the Levant and stated that it is acting "under the guise of this holy religion and have given themselves the name 'Islamic State' in an attempt to export their false Islam" and (citing the Quran).

"The punishment for those who wage war against God and his Prophet and who strive to sow corruption on earth is death, crucifixion, the severing of hands and feet on opposite sides or banishment from the land. This is the disgrace for them in this world and in the hereafter they will receive grievous torment".

He has been criticized for not expressly stating that Islamic State was heretical. The Ash'ari school of Islamic theology – to which El-Tayeb belongs – does not allow calling a person who follows the shahada an apostate.

El-Tayeb has strongly come out against the practice of takfirism, declaring a Muslim an apostate, which is used by Islamic State to "judge and accuse anyone who doesn't toe their line with apostasy and outside the realm of the faith" and declares "jihad on peaceful Muslims" by using "flawed interpretations of some Qur'anic texts, the prophet's Sunnah, and the Imams' views, believing incorrectly that they are leaders of Muslim armies fighting infidel peoples in unbelieving lands".

=== Wahhabism and Salafism ===
In late 2016, at a conference of over a hundred Sunni scholars in Chechnya, El-Tayeb defined orthodox Sunnism as "the Ash'arites and Maturidites (adherents of the theological systems of Imam Abu Mansur al-Maturidi and Imam Abul Hasan al-Ash'ari) ... followers of any of the four schools of thought (Hanafi, Shafi'i, Maliki or Hanbali) and ... also the followers of the Sufism of Imam Junaid al-Baghdadi in doctrines, manners and [spiritual] purification." Having said that, Sheikh Ahmad el-Tayeb excluded the “Salafis” from the term of Ahluls Sunna (Sunnis) stating that Salafis – also known as Wahhabis – are not from among the Sunnis. The conference was believed to have been designed to take an "uncompromising stand against the growing Takfiri terrorism that is playing havoc across the world."

=== Christians ===
On 7 November 2017, he met Pope Francis in the Vatican, to discuss spreading the culture of peace and coexistence and renouncing extremism and Islamophobia. In February 2019, they met again in Abu Dhabi during the Pope's visit to the United Arab Emirates, where he also signed the Document on Human Fraternity. On 15 November 2019, they met again in the Vatican, to reflect further on the goals of the signed document. This text later inspired the UN resolution that designated February 4 as the International Day of Human Fraternity.

=== Women ===
He wrote that Islam forbids Muslim women from marrying non-Muslims, because the latter do not believe in Muhammad and his religion, meanwhile Muslim men would allow their non-Muslim women to practice their religion freely.

In May 2021, he wrote on Twitter: "A woman is permitted to assume senior positions such as in the judiciary or the issuing of fatwas and is also allowed to travel without a guardian", then he added, "there is “no such as thing" as 'Bait Al-Ta’a' (House of Obedience) in Islam, and that guardians have "no right" to prevent women from marrying without adequate reasons."

== Awards ==
- In 2005, he received the Order of Independence by King of Jordan, Abdullah II of Jordan, during his participation in the International Islamic Conference which was held in Jordan that year.
- In 2013, Sheikh Zayed Book Award, Cultural Personality of the Year.
- The Muslim 500 Mention
- In March 2020 at the initiative of the President of Uzbekistan Shavkat Mirziyoyev, Imam Ahmad el-Tayyeb has been awarded the title of Honorary Citizen of Samarkand at the International Conference "Imam Abu Mansur Maturidi and the Teachings of Maturidiyya: The Past and the Present" in Samarkand. The Governor of Samarkand, Babur Applakulov, granted Ahmad el-Tayyeb, the status of honorary citizen of the city of Samarkand, after the decision was ratified by the House of Representatives and the President of the Republic of Uzbekistan. The honor comes in recognition of el-Tayyeb's efforts to propagate moderate thoughts of Islam worldwide and strengthen the Egyptian-Uzbek ties.

== Books ==
- al-Jānib al-naqdī fī falsafat Abī al-Barakāt al-Baghdādi. Cairo: Dār al-Shurūq. 2004. ISBN 9770910783.

== See also ==
- 2016 international conference on Sunni Islam in Grozny
- Ahmad Karima
- Ali al-Jifri
- Ali Gomaa
- List of Ash'aris and Maturidis
- Shawki Allam

Sunni Islam titles
Preceded by Nasr Farid Wasil	Grand Mufti of Egypt; 2002–2003	Succeeded by Ali Gomaa
Preceded by Mohamed Sayed Tantawy	Grand Imam of al-Azhar Mosque; 2010–Present	Succeeded by Incumbent
