= Andrei Kubatin =

Uzbek archaeologist, Turkologist and historian

Andrei Viktorovich Kubatin
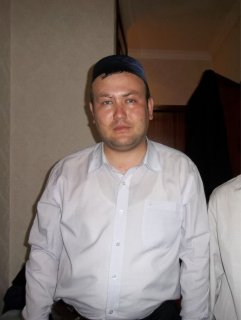
- Born: 9 March 1984; Karasu, Urta-Circhik district, Tashkent region
- Died: 29 October 2020 (aged 36); Tashkent
- Other names: Russian: Андрей Викторович Кубатин
- Known for: Uzbek archaeologist, Turkologist and historian. Political prisoner.

Andrei Viktorovich Kubatin, Russian Андрей Викторович Кубатин, (9 March 1984, Tashkent Oblast – 29 October 2020) was an Uzbek archaeologist, Turkologist and historian.

Professionally, Andrei Kubatin was an expert on the history and culture of the Turkic world.

Due to his political involvement, he was wrongfully arrested in a police raid in Uzbekistan in March 2017. In late September 2019, a court in Tashkent acquitted the scholar and ordered his release after dozens of academics from several countries signed a petition calling on Uzbek President Shavkat Mirziyoyev to release Kubatin. A year after his release from prison, Andrei Kubatin died from the effects of COVID-19.

== Life ==
Andrei Viktorovich Kubatin was born on 9 March 1984, in Tashkent to a Muslim family. After graduating from high school with honours, Andrei Kubatin entered the State National University, majoring in history. While still a student, he became interested in Turkic linguistics, from the ancient Turkic runic script to all modern Turkic languages.

=== Scholarly career ===
In 2005, after graduating from the faculty of history, Andrei Kubatin began his master's studies at the same university, where he studied archaeology with a focus on numismatics, where scholars such as Professor Kamoliddin Shamsiddin Sirozhiddin Ugli, Gaibulla Babayarov, Vladimir Vladimirovich Tishin, Yuri Fyodorovich Buryakov and others have worked.

Andrei Kubatin was fluent in several dozen languages, especially Turkic. (At the age of three he was already fluent in his native Russian and Kazakh, and could read and write perfectly – this was related to his multi-ethnic family background: his grandmother Maria Kubatin was a Kuban Cossack who married an ethnic Kazakh from the Urta-Circhik region of Tashkent Oblast – Ergas Dzharkumbetov, and his grandfather on the other side, Surazh Mukhtarov, was Azerbaijani). As a polyglot, he supplemented his knowledge by studying Old Persian, Arabic, Persian and Old Uzbek.

He is the author and co-author of 4 monographs, more than 80 articles and abstracts for scientific conferences.

=== Political persecution ===
After the rise to power of Uzbek President Shavkat Mirziyoyev, the struggle against people who pointed to the essence of Uzbek national identity through history continued, and Andrei Kubatin, as a scientist, was one of those targeted for repression.

Andrei Kubatin, a senior lecturer at the Tashkent State Institute of Oriental Studies, was sentenced to eleven years in prison in December 2017 (his sentence was reduced to five years a year later) under Article 157 Part 1 (Treason against the State) of the Criminal Code of the Republic of Uzbekistan.

The specific charge against Kubatin was that he had surreptitiously passed secret materials to the Turkish Cooperation and Coordination Agency, Ankara's foreign aid agency. According to investigators, the materials in question may have been used to incite anti-Turkish sentiment and to provide confidential information about Uzbekistan's geological reserves. Kubatin's lawyers dismissed such accusations as absurd, saying that the materials in question were freely available to the public.

The academic and scientific community sent a letter of protest to Uzbek President Shavkat M. Mirziyoyev, signed by approximately 150 Uzbek and international scholars. The Uzbek Academy of Sciences did not want to get involved in the case, apparently because of possible political implications, although its own semi-official explanation was "lack of information about the details of the case".

After repeated appeals by internationally renowned scientists to Mirziyoyev and following widespread international backlash, on 26 September 2019, the Tashkent Regional Criminal Court rehabilitated Andrei Kubatin and released him from prison.

Officials at the U.S. Embassy in Uzbekistan have called Kubatin an example for all who seek freedom and justice.

=== Premature death ===
On 29 October 2020, Andrey Kubatin died of complications caused by COVID-19.

After his death, doubts were raised about proper treatment. Two days before his death, his sister Klara visited her brother and found on the patient's bedside table all the medicines that relatives had bought and brought for his treatment; moreover, he had only 10% lung damage, which is a moderate degree of severity of COVID-19.

Kubatin was buried according to Muslim traditions in a Muslim cemetery near his grandmother, father and aunt in the village of Karasu in the Urta-Circhik district, the place of his birth.

== Publications ==
- KUBATIN, A.V. Система титулов в тюркском каганате: генезис и преемственность. (The system of titles in the Turkic kaganate: genesis and continuity) Tashkent: YANGI NASHR, 2016. 192 p.
- KUBATIN, Andrey, et al. Древнетюркские термины в согдийских документах с горы Муг (Ancient Turkic terms in Sogdian documents from Mount Mugh.) Ural-Altaic Studies, 2014, 03 (14): 12–23.
- BABAYAROV, G.; KUBATIN, A. Древнетюркские титулы в эпоху до Тюркского Каганата. (Ancient Turkic titles in the era before the Turkic Kaganate). 2012.
- BABAYAROV, G. B.; KUBATIN, A. В. Монеты западно-тюркского каганата с титулом тюрк-каган. (Coins of the West Turkic Kaganate with the title Turk-Kagan). Эпиграфика Востока/Epigraphy of the East, 2015, 31: 189–201.
