= 2020 International Maturidi Conference =

Islamic conference in Samarkand, Uzbekistan

Imam Maturidi International Conference
- Native name: Imom Abu Mansur Moturidiy va moturidiya ta'limoti: o‘tmish va bugun
- Date: 3–5 March 2020
- Location: Samarkand, Uzbekistan
- Also known as: Imam Maturidi Conference in Uzbekistan
- Previous event: 2016 international conference on Sunni Islam in Grozny; 2017 International Maturidi Kalam Conference

The 2020 International Maturidi Conference was an international scientific-practical conference held over three days, from 3 to 5 March 2020, in the city of Samarkand and under the title of "Imam Abu Mansur Maturidi and the Teachings of Maturidiyya: The Past and the Present" (Arabic: الإمام أبو منصور الماتريدي والتعاليم الماتريدية: التاريخ والحاضر).

The conference was sponsored by the President of Uzbekistan Shavkat Mirziyoyev, and was organized jointly with the Committee on Religious Affairs under the Cabinet of Ministers of the Republic of Uzbekistan, the Imam Bukhari International Scientific Research Center (IBISRC), the Center for Islamic Civilization, the Muslims Board of Uzbekistan, the International Islamic Academy of Uzbekistan, and the Egyptian Al-Azhar Complex.

The main purpose of the conference was to further study Imam Maturidi's scientific heritage, to reveal the essence of the teachings of Maturidiyya against destructive sects, the promotion of the Uzbekistan's contribution to Islamic civilization, and shedding light on the scientific legacy of scholars from Transoxiana.

The participants at the conference discussed certain issues related to Islam and Muslims, including teachings of Maturidiyya and modernity, and preservation and development of religious values in the modern state.

== Participants ==
The conference included the participation of delegations representing many Islamic bodies and scientific universities, as well as scholars from Uzbekistan, scholars from the al-Azhar, scholars of the Council of Senior Scholars, Muslim Council of Elders, and the Bulgarian Islamic Academy. In addition, it was attended by scholars, religious leaders, and directors of scientific and research centres from over 20 countries, including Algeria, Jordan, Indonesia, Malaysia, Turkey, Pakistan, Bosnia Herzegovina, Kazakhstan, Kyrgyzstan, Russia, Ukraine, Switzerland, Germany, and United Kingdom.

Prominent scholars that participated included:

- Usmankhan Alimov (Grand Mufti of Uzbekistan)
- Ahmad el-Tayyeb (Grand Imam of Al-Azhar)
- Tariq Sha'ban (Director of Al-Azhar Observatory for Countering Extremism)
- Muhammad Rafi' 'Usmani (President of Darul Uloom Karachi)
- Albir Krganov (Mufti of the Spiritual Assembly of Muslims of the Russian Federation)
- Ahmad Tamim (Mufti of Ukraine)
- Sa'id Foudah (Leading Kalam scholar from Jordan)
- Sönmez Kutlu (professor at the Faculty of Religious Studies of Ankara University)
- Hureyre Kam (Professor of Islamic Studies / Islamic theology at the University of Hamburg)
- Mohd Yusof Othman (Director of the Institute of Islamic Civilization in Malaysia)
- Mohd Farid Mohd Shahran (Director, Centre of the Study of Shari'ah, Law and Politics, Institute of Islamic Understanding Malaysia)
- Kamaluddin Nurdin Marjuni (Associate Professor in Department of Akidah and Religion Studies, Universiti Sains Islam Malaysia)
- Rafik Mukhametshin (Rector of the Russian Islamic University, Deputy Chairman of the Spiritual administration of Muslims of the Republic of Tatarstan)
- Ramil Adigamov, Head of Department of Arabic Language at Kazan Islamic University.
- Zaylabidin Azhimamatov, Doctor of Theological Sciences of the Osh State University.

== Conference recommendations ==
The conference came out with a set of recommendations, most importantly:

- Establishing a memorial complex for Imam al-Maturidi, according to the traditions of the national architecture in Samarkand.
- Preparing commentaries and glosses on his books, such as: "Kitab al-Tawhid", and "Kitab Ta'wilat al-Qur'an" or "Ta'wilat Ahl al-Sunnah", known also as "Tafsir al-Maturidi".
- Collecting and preserving electronic copies of the literature of al-Maturidi and the Maturidi scholars, such as al-Nasafi – author of "Tabsirat al-Adillah".
- Organizing a competition for the researchers of the Maturidi's heritage in al-Azhar and choosing its winners.
- Holding a periodic scientific forum for the contributions of al-Maturidi to the Islamic civilization and Muslim cultures.
- Searching for other aspects of accepting others in the heritage of Maturidi and publishing it.
- The necessity of teaching the theory of knowledge (epistemology).
- Teaching and spreading al-Maturidi's dogmas and simplifying them for students against extremism and radicalism in the world.
- Creating a special website where information about scientific heritage of Imam al-Maturidi and teachings of Maturidiyya will be posted.

== See also ==
- Imam Maturidi International Scientific Research Center
- 2016 international conference on Sunni Islam in Grozny
- List of Ash'aris and Maturidis
