= Mohammed Habib =

Egyptian politician

Mohammed Habib (Arabic: محمد حبيب) was a Deputy General Guide and the second-in-command of the Egyptian Muslim Brotherhood. He was expected to be the next leader of the organization after former leader, Supreme Guide Mohammed Mahdi Akef, announced his resignation in April 2009. Habib left the Muslim Brotherhood and has since become a critic of Mohamed Morsi, who was the Egyptian president.

He is said to be a moderate, and had been seen as a reformist member within the organization. He rejects terrorism and violence and supports democracy. Habib is also the founder of the Renaissance Party.

== See also ==
- Tharwat el-Kherbawy
- Ahmad Karima
