= Usmankhan Alimov =

Grand Mufti of Uzbekistan (1950–2021)

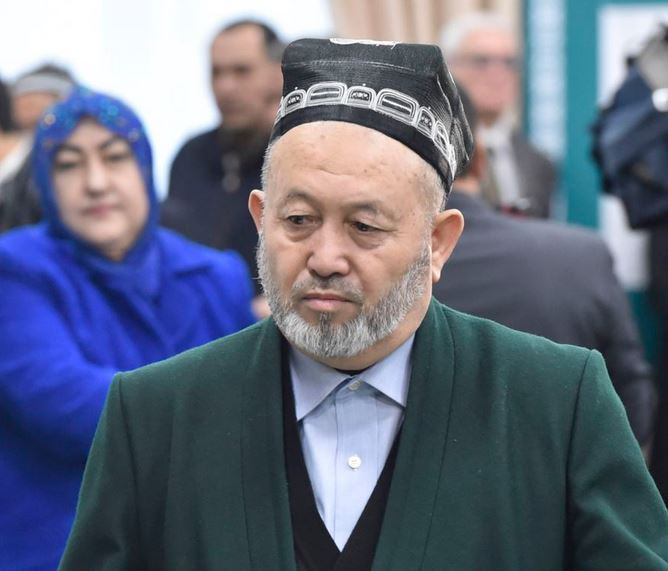
Usmankhan Alimov

Usmankhan Alimov (Uzbek: Усмонхон Олимов, Usmonxon Olimov; 1 January 1950 – 15 August 2021) was a Grand Mufti of Uzbekistan and Chairman of the Muslim Board of Uzbekistan. In 2018, he was included in the list of 500 Most Influential Muslims in the world.

== Biography ==
Alimov was born on 1 January 1950 in the town of Ishtikhon in Samarqand Region. In 1957–67 he studied at school 57, named after Alisher Navoi in his home town. His religion education he acquired in Miri Arab madrassah in Bukhara in 1982-1983. And later he graduated at Tashkent Islam Institution named after Imom al-Bukhari in 1987. He died in Moscow on 15 August 2021 at the age of 71 from the consequences of a serious illness.

== Career ==
Beginning from 1987 he worked as imam of 'Imam Bukhari' mosque in Payariq town. Later in 1989-90s he studied at Karaviyin University in Morocco. After university he continued his job in "Imam Bukhari" mosque of Payariq. Starting from January 2000 he was appointed Grand Mufti of Samarkand Region (Viloyat).

Following the resignation on grounds of health of Chief Mufti Abdurashid Bahromov, the Mejlis of Ulama of Uzbekistan elected Alimov Chief Mufti of Uzbekistan on 8 August 2006, a post he held until his death.

Alimov died in 2021 from COVID-19.

== See also ==
- 2020 International Maturidi Conference
