= 2016 international conference on Sunni Islam in Grozny =

Islamic conference in the Chechen Republic

Chechnya Conference International Conference Who are the Ahl al-Sunna?
- Date: 25 August 2016– 27 August 2016
- Location: Grozny, Chechnya, Russia
- Also known as: Grozny Conference; Chechnya Conference; The World Islamic Conference 'Who are Ahl al-Sunnah wa al-Jama'ah?'; Chechnya anti-Salafi Conference
- Organized by: Shaykh Ahmad Kadyrov; Regional Charitable Fund; Foundation for Chechen Islamic Culture and Education; Tabah Foundation; Muslim Council of Elders
- Participants: Over 200 Muslim scholars-theologians and religious leaders from various Islamic schools of thought from Egypt, Syria, Lebanon, Jordan, Yemen, Morocco, Kuwait, Sudan, Qatar, India, Indonesia, Malaysia, Britain, Russia, South Africa, Uzbekistan, and Azerbaijan
- Previous event: Sufism: Personal Security and State Stability
- Website: Official website

The 2016 conference on Sunni Islam in Grozny or shortly Chechnya Conference was convened to define the term "Ahl al-Sunnah wa al-Jama'ah", i.e. who are "the people of Sunnah and majority Muslim community", and oppose Takfiri groups. The conference was held in the Chechen Republic capital of Grozny from 25 to 27 August 2016, sponsored by the president of Chechnya, Ramzan Kadyrov, supported by Vladimir Putin, and attended by approximately 200 Muslim scholars from 30 countries, especially from Russia, Egypt, Syria, Libya, Kuwait, Sudan, Jordan, etc. at the invitation of Yemeni scholar, Ali al-Jifri.

The conference was dedicated to the 65th anniversary of the birth of Kadyrov's father, Akhmad Kadyrov, the first President of Chechnya.

The conference was notable for defining Sunni Islam in the final communiqué of the conference as including Ash'aris and Maturidis in theology (Aqidah), Hanafis, Shafi'is, Malikis and Hanbalis in jurisprudence (Fiqh), and people of spirituality (Sufis) - but not the Wahhabi or Salafi movements. It condemned Salafism and Wahhabism as "misguided" sects, along with Islamist movements such as the Muslim Brotherhood, Hizb ut-Tahrir, Al-Qaeda, the Islamic State and others.

== Conference declaration ==
The conference's final declaration stated that:

Ahl al-Sunna wa al-Jama'a [Sunni Muslims] are the Ash'aris and Maturidis (adherents of the theological systems of Imam Abu al-Hasan al-Ash'ari and Imam Abu Mansur al-Maturidi). In matters of belief, they are followers of any of the four schools of thought (Hanafi, Maliki, Shafi’i or Hanbali) and are also the followers of the Sufism of Imam al-Junayd al-Baghdadi in doctrines, manners and [spiritual] purification.

== Participants ==
Over 200 Muslim scholars-theologians and religious leaders from various Islamic schools of thought from 30 countries all over the world, including Egypt, Syria, Lebanon, Jordan, Yemen, Morocco, Libya, Kuwait, Sudan, Qatar, Iraq, India, Indonesia, Britain, Russia, South Africa, Uzbekistan, and Azerbaijan.

Notable scholars and preachers in attendance included:

- Ahmed el-Tayeb (Grand Imam of Al-Azhar)
- Shawki Allam (Grand Mufti of Egypt)
- Ali Gomaa (former Grand Mufti of Egypt)
- Ibrahim Salah al-Hudhud (president of al-Azhar University)
- Abdel-Hadi al-Qasabi (chairman of the Supreme Council of Sufi Orders in Egypt)
- Usamah al-Azhari (Egypt)
- Sheikh Abubakr Ahmad, Grand Mufti of India
- Shaikh Anwar Ahmad al Baghdadi
- Muhammad Muneeb-ur-Rehman, Grand Mufti of Pakistan
- Ahmad Badreddin Hassoun (Grand Mufti of Syria)
- Abdel-Fattah al-Bezm (Grand Mufti of Damascus)
- Tawfiq Ramadan al-Bouti, the son of Sheikh Mohamed Said Ramadan Al-Bouti (Syria)
- Salah Mezhiev (Grand Mufti of Chechnya)
- Kamil Samigullin (Grand Mufti of Tatarstan)
- Allahshukur Pashazade (Grand Mufti of Caucasus)
- Abdul Karim Khasawneh (Grand Mufti of Jordan)
- Sa'id Foudah (A Leading Contemporary Kalam Scholar from Jordan)
- Umar bin Hafiz (Yemen)
- Ali al-Jifri (Yemen)
- Saif al-Asri (Yemen)
- Ahmed Abbadi (Secretary-General of the Mohammedia League of Moroccan Ulama)
- Idris al-Fassi al-Fahri (Morocco)
- Muhammad Abdul Ghaffar al-Sharif (Kuwait)
- Hatim al-Awni (Saudi Arabia)

== Recommendations ==
The conference participants reflected their support for what in Russia is considered “traditional” Islam. Some suggestions came out of the conference, including recommendations to:

- The establishment of a TV channel in Russia to counter Al-Jazeera, and "convey to people a truthful message of Islam and fight against extremism and terrorism."
- The establishment of "a scientific centre in Chechnya to monitor and study contemporary groups... and refute and scientifically criticise extremist thought." The proposed name for the centre is Tabsir (clairvoyance).
- The "return to the schools of great knowledge", such as: (Al-Azhar in Egypt, al-Qarawiyyin in Morocco, and al-Zaytuna in Tunisia, and the Hadramout in Yemen), excluding Saudi religious institutions, particularly the Islamic University of Madinah.
- Scholarships would be provided for those who are interested in studying sharia to counter Saudi funding in this field.

== Criticism ==
The conference evoked a torrent of condemnation and criticism mostly from the Saudi Arabian establishment closely linked to the Saudi Kingdom such as the Saudi Council of Senior Scholars—as well as from the scholars of the Salafi, Wahhabi, and Ikhwani movements—for what they perceived as Russian meddling in regional politics via religion. Twenty-one religious institutions across the world signed a petition of support to Salafis, expressing solidarity with them, emphasizing that the conference participants only represent themselves. Syrian Sufi scholar Hasan al-Dugim condemned the conference as a sham and defended the "Salafi brothers"; arguing that they are closer to Sufis than "Putin's scholars". The conference was also discerned by the noticeable absence of delegates from Turkey.

The International Association of Muslim Scholars, an organization led by Muslim Brotherhood-linked Yusuf al-Qaradawi denounced the conference as "a shameful attempt to sow dissent within the Muslim community." The conference has also been widely criticised for toeing a Russian government line. Prominent Russian religious leaders avoided the conference in protest. The chairman of the Spiritual Administration of Muslims of Moscow, Ildar Alyautdinov, expressed his disillusionment with the resolution of the conference.

In response to the widespread criticism received in the Islamic World, Al-Azhar publicly distanced itself from the conference and in mid-October sent a high-level delegation led by the senior Azhari scholar, Shaykh Abbas Shouman to Saudi Arabia and reconciled with the Salafi religious establishment, including the Grand Mufti Abdul Azeez Aal-Shaykh.

== See also ==
- 2020 International Maturidi Conference
- Amman Message
- International Islamic Unity Conference (Iran)
- Al-Azhar Shia Fatwa
- A Common Word Between Us and You
- List of Ash'aris and Maturidis
- Kalam
- Wahhabi War
- Nejd Expedition
- Hadith of Najd
