= Tashkent State University of Oriental Studies =

Public university in Tashkent, Uzbekistan

- Toshkent davlat sharqshunoslik universiteti
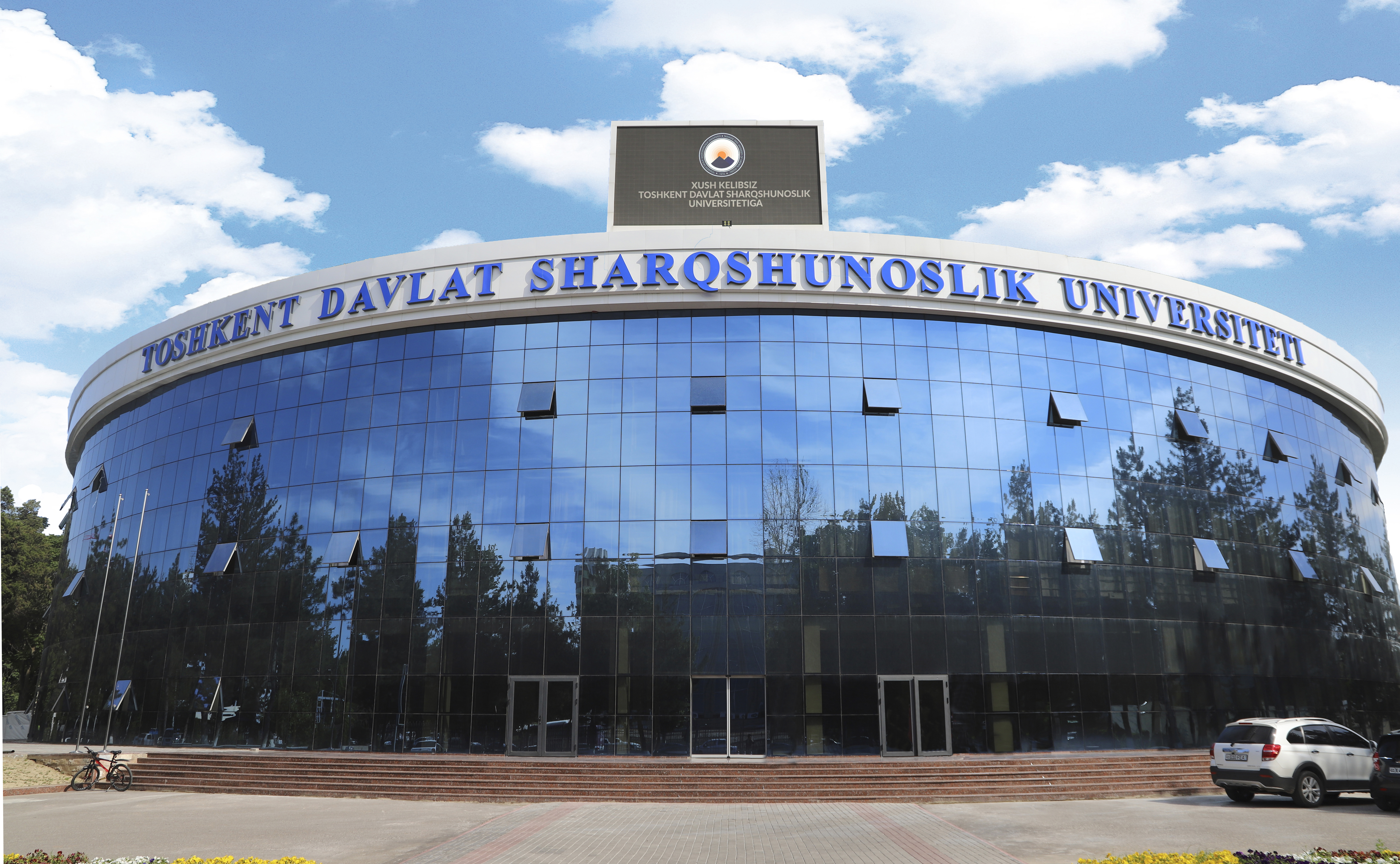
- School logo
- Other name: TSIOS
- Former name: Ташкентский государственный университет востоковедения
- Type: Public
- Established: 1918
- Rector: Rikhsieva Gulchehra Shavkatovna
- Location: 25 Shakhrisabz Street, Mirabat, Tashkent, 100060, Uzbekistan
- Campus: Four
- Language: Uzbek, Russian
- Website: tsuos.uz

The Tashkent State University of Oriental Studies (Uzbek: Toshkent davlat sharqshunoslik instituti) is a state institution of higher education in Tashkent, the capital of Uzbekistan. Founded in November 1918, the school is the only Oriental-studies institute in Central Asia and Asia's oldest Oriental institute of higher education. It is one of the largest schools of its kind in Asia and the former Soviet Union.

== History ==
The Turkestan Institute of Oriental Studies was founded in Tashkent in November 1918. Central Asia's first (and only) Oriental higher-educational institute, the school began preparing qualified specialists in a number of branches of Oriental studies for Turkestan and neighboring countries. Subjects included ethnography, geography, the study of local lore, the history and economy of Turkestan and neighboring Oriental countries, Islamic history and law, and eastern languages and literature. Two hundred thirty-four students were accepted in 1918. They were taught Arabic, Persian, Chinese, Pushtu, Urdu, Turkish; local languages (Uzbek, Tadzhik, Kirghiz, Turkmen, Tatar), and European languages (English, German and French). Other subjects were the geography of Afghanistan, India, Iran, East and West Turkestan and Bukhara; Uzbek, Kirghiz, Persian, Tadzhik, Kazakh, Afghan and Karakalpak ethnography, and Central Asian, Iranian, Afghan, Indian and ancient history.

Third-year students were taught specialized subjects, including Turkestan languages, Iranian and Arab philology, and Islamic studies. The institute prepared language and history teachers for local schools. It had 5,300 books and over 200 manuscripts by 1922. The first dean of the Oriental faculty was A. Y. Shmidt.

It was attached to the National University of Uzbekistan in accordance with Resolution No. 186 of the Cabinet Ministers of the Republic of Uzbekistan in July 1991, and was named on the basis of a 26 July 1991 resolution by the Ministry of Higher and Secondary Special Education.

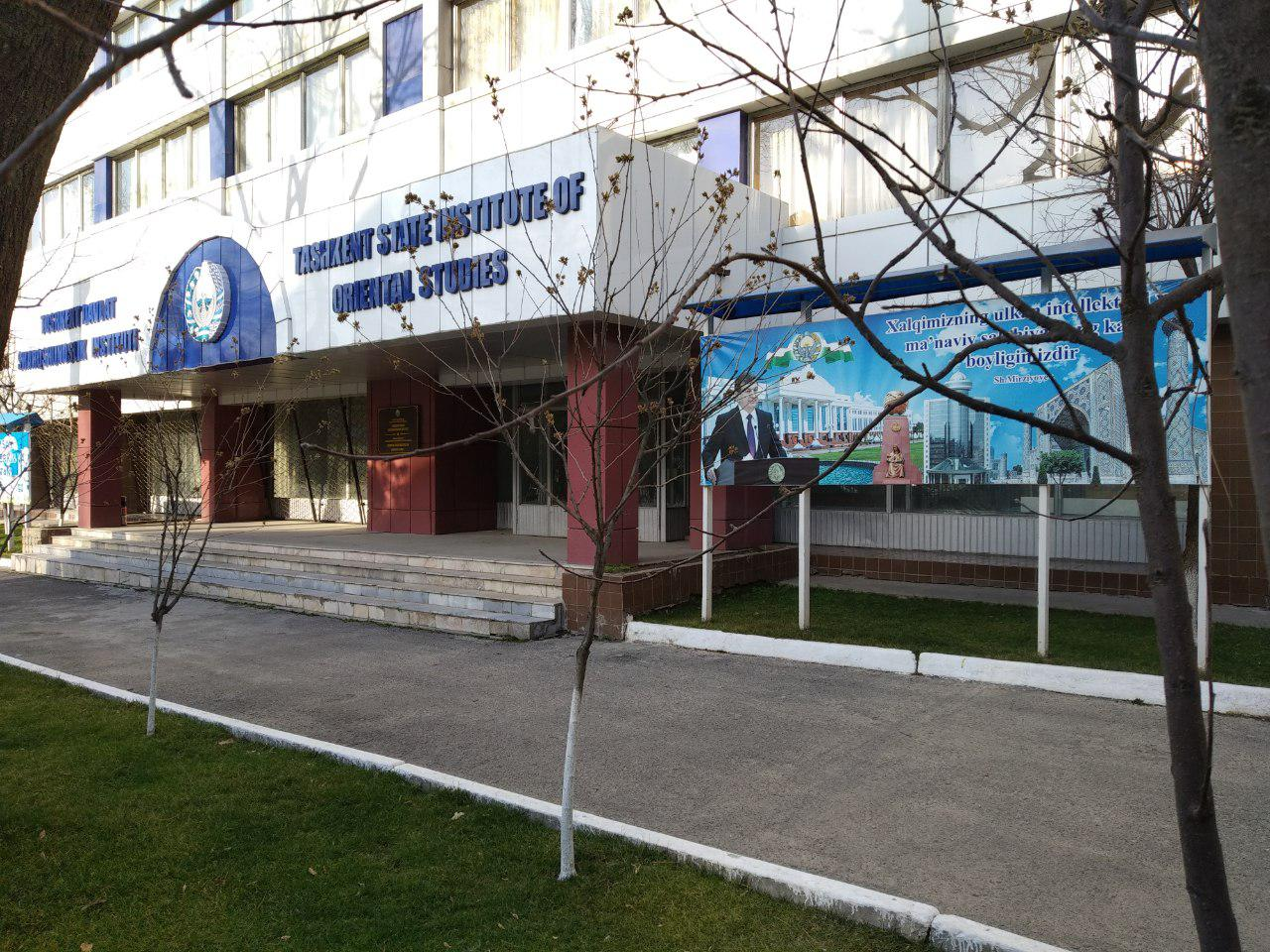
The institute's main building

== Faculties and chairs ==
The institute has five faculties.

=== Oriental philology ===
The faculty was founded for Oriental philology and history by rector orders K/05-36 (24 August 2000) and 01-142 (30 June 2011). It was renamed as the faculty of Oriental philology by rector order 01-243 on 20 September 2014.

Among Oriental-philology graduates are academicians A. Rustamov and U. Karimov, government-prize winners I. Abdullayev, S. G'aniyeva, A. Hayitmetov and P. Qodirov, international-prize winners Q. Mahmudov, Sh. Shomuhamedov and E. Rustamov, and ambassadors S. Mirqosimov, F. Teshaboyev, A. Shayhov, S. Inog'omov and A. Usmonov.

Chairs:

- Arab philology
- Iranian and Afghan philology
- Turkic languages
- Japanese philology
- South Asian languages
- Eastern literature
- Classical philology
- Translation studies

=== Chinese studies ===
The faculty of Chinese studies was founded by presidential order 2228 PQ on (3 September 2014) and order number 01-243 (20 September 2014).

Chairs:

- Chinese language and literature
- Chinese policy, history and economy
- English
- Pedagogy and psychology

=== Korean studies ===
The Korean-studies faculty was founded in 2018 to train qualified specialists.

Chairs:

- Korean philology
- Economy and policy of South Korea
- History and culture of South Korea

=== History and philosophy ===
The faculty of history and philosophy has five departments (chairs). It had nine professors, 12 doctors of sciences, 16 science candidates and 27 senior lecturers and teachers during the 2018-2019 academic year.

Chairs:

- Eastern history and contemporary issues
- Central Asian history and source studies
- Oriental philosophy and culture
- Social sciences
- Western European languages

=== Foreign economics and policy ===
The faculty, founded in 2008, has undergone several name changes. It was created to train Oriental economists and politicians to investigate and analyze problems, social and economic development, security, and military-technical development of the Asia-Pacific region, the Middle East, and the Commonwealth of Independent States.

Chairs:

- World policy and international relations
- Foreign economies
- International economic relations
- Economic theory
- Mathematics and information technology

== See also ==
- Imam Maturidi International Scientific Research Center
