= Research Centre for Islamic History, Art and Culture =

OIC research centre in Turkey

Research Centre For Islamic History, Art and Culture
- İslâm Tarih, Sanat ve Kültür Araştırma Merkezi
- Official patch of the IRCICA
- Abbreviation: IRCICA
- Nickname: Istanbul Research Center for Islamic Culture and Arts
- Formation: 1979; 47 years ago
- Founder: OIC
- Founded at: Istanbul, Turkey
- Merger of: International Commission for the Preservation of Islamic Heritage (ICPICH)
- Type: Nonprofit
- Legal status: Research center
- Purpose: Promote and research Islamic culture and civilization
- Professional title: Research Centre For Islamic History, Art and Culture
- Headquarters: Hoca Paşa Mahallesi, Alemdar Caddesi, No. 15, Bâbıâlî Girişi Cağaloğlu, 34110 Fatih
- Location: Istanbul, Turkey
- Region served: Worldwide
- Methods: Research, publication, public conference
- Fields: Islam
- Members: 57 member states
- Official language: Arabic, English, French
- Secretary General: Hissein Brahim Taha
- Director general: Mahmud Erol Kılıç
- Board of directors: General Assembly; Governing Board; Research and Publications Department; Departments; Library and Archive Department; Administration and Finance Department; Information Technology Department
- Main organ: Organisation of Islamic Cooperation
- Funding: Research center
- Website: ircica.org

The Research Centre For Islamic History, Art and Culture (Turkish: İslâm Tarih, Sanat ve Kültür Araştırma Merkezi; abbreviated as IRCICA), also known as the Istanbul Research Center for Islamic Culture and Arts, is the first cultural centre and a subsidiary organ of the Organisation of Islamic Cooperation established in 1979 after the Republic of Turkey proposed IRCICA in the 7th Islamic Conference of Foreign Ministers (now the OIC Council of Foreign Ministers), in Istanbul, 1976. The proposal was adopted by the OIC under the resolution no. 3/7-ECS. It formally started inaugural functioning on 23 May 1982.

The Research Center for Islamic History, Art and Culture is focused on various academic principles concerning the history of Muslim countries, arts and sciences in Islam, Islamic culture, and civilization. Likewise the OIC, Research Centre For Islamic History, Art and Culture works under the 57 members of the OIC and are permanent representatives of the IRCICA.

== History ==
The IRCICA was originally introduced by the OIC after the Republic of Turkey, a member of the OIC proposed the idea. However, the establishment of Statute of the centre was created later when the OIC adopted a resolution in the 9th summit of foreign ministers held in Dakar in 1978. It later redesigned by adopting a resolution no. 1/6-Org (IS) in the 6th summit held in Dakar, 1991.

It was officially made operational in 1980 when the foreign ministers of the 57 members states held 11th summit in Islamabad. IRCICA functioned under its own mandate from 1983 to 2000 and thereafter, it serves as a secretariat and executive organ of the International Commission for the Preservation of Islamic Heritage (ICPICH), which became fully operational after the 13th summit of foreign ministers was held in Niamey, 1982. The International Commission for the Preservation of Islamic Heritage (ICPICH) was later merged into IRCICA in June 2000 after the 27th summit of foreign ministers was held in Kuala Lumpur. The decision was taken soon after chairperson of the ICPICH, Faisal bin Fahd Al Saud died in 1999. He was also serving as the president of the Youth Welfare, the Kingdom of Saudi Arabia. After merger took place, all works of the ICPICH were incorporated to work programs of the IRCICA.

== Abbreviated name ==
The Research Centre For Islamic History, Art and Culture – RCIHAC was so difficult to pronounce and remember, the OIC took a decision to change it into IRCICA which means I – Istanbul or international, R – Research, C – Centre, I – Islamic, C – Culture, and A – Arts. Due to its common usage and scope, the organisation was to be identified with this rare abbreviation and it was adopted as the official abbreviation of the organisation than being known as RCIHAC.

== Logo ==
IRCICA's logo do not indicate its significance or background, but it was created coincidentally in 1985 when the organisation was making documentary films about calligraphy. At the same time, a Turkish architecture named Özkul Eren presented a logo that was subsequently adopted by the IRCICA as its official identify.

=== Motto ===
The verse number 13 of surah Al-Hujurat, the 49th chapter of the Quran was adopted organization's motto.

O mankind, We have ... made you into nations and tribes that you might get to know one another. Surely the noblest of you in the sight of Allah is he who is the most righteous... (Arabic: وَجَعَلْنَاكُمْ شُعُوبًا وَقَبَائِلَ لِتَعَارَفُوا إِنَّ أَكْرَمَكُمْ عِندَ اللَّهِ أَأَتْقَاكُمْ)

— Surah Al-Hujurat, Verse 13, Research Centre For Islamic History, Art and Culture – IRCICA. IRCICA Research Centre For Islamic History, Art and Culture. 1980-01-01.

Illuminated by a Turkish writer, Rikkat Kunt, motto is calligraphed by Hasan Çelebi, a Turkish Islamic calligrapher.

== Organisational structure ==
IRCICA's organizational structure is collectively known as boards and departments. It consists of a general assembly, governing board and director general.

- General Assembly – issues guidelines concerning its activities. It determines budget proposals for its submission to the Council of Foreign Ministers.
- Governing Board – is a governing body of the organisation. It consists of representatives of nine member states, including one representative from the host country Turkey. They are elected by the General Assembly the Islamic Commission for Economic, Cultural and Social Affairs.
- Departments – it consists of four main departments:
  - Research and Publications Department
    - Studies on the Holy Quran
    - Islamic Civilization and Muslim Nations
    - Cultural and Architectural Heritage
    - Islamic Arts and Handicrafts
  - Library and Archive Department
    - Library
    - Archive
  - Administration and Finance Department
    - Finance
    - Personnel
    - General services
  - Information Technology Department

The first director general of the organisation was Doğan Kuban, who also served a professor at Istanbul Technical University while the second and current director general is Ekmeleddin İhsanoğlu. The board of directors consists of a secretary general or any representative of the OIC, a director general, and 10 academician with significant experience in arts and culture. They are elected from member states for a term of 3 years. All representatives, including director general is approved by the Supreme Council of the Organization of the Islamic Conference. The board of directors also served at the International Commission for the Preservation of Islamic Cultural Heritage (ICPICH), however, it was disestablishments in 2000 and all its duties were transferred to IRCICA. ICPICH was established in 1983.

The IRCICA's director general is recruited through an advertisement issued to 57 member states and receives a basic salary amounting $5,500, including other allowance under the OIC Personal Regulations.

=== Al-Farabi Digital Library ===
IRCICA Al-Farabi Digital Library uses the latest technology and software including optical character recognition (OCR) technology. It took 5 years to update and maintain. The library software was developed in 2011 and became readable after software upgradation took place. The publishing material in library is used by researchers across the 75 countries, including the United States, Germany, Greece, Iran, Britain, Egypt, Saudi Arabia, Iraq, and France, in addition to Turkey.

It houses 85,000 books, including thesis in 145 languages. The library houses 120,000 periodicals, 12,250 grey literature, 4,300 offprints, 1,700 maps, 264,000 archival research, 1,650 audio and video cassettes, and 750 CDs and DVDs. It also houses 23,500 transparencies, 1,150 microfi ches and microfi learning management system.

Considered one of the prominent libraries in Turkey, it is located in the imperial residence, Yıldız Palace, Istanbul.

== Objectives ==
The organisation is objectively focused on conducting and publishing research concerning Islamic civilization, organize conferences, in addition to conducting symposiums and art exhibitions. It also conduct research in the field of Islamic history, art and culture across the world. Development of cooperation between the Muslim nations is also one of its duties. Its academic disciplines are also focused on the history of Science, archaeology, architecture, fine arts and traditional handicrafts, and preservation of cultural development.

It also publish books within the framework of its objectives. It has published a total number of 72 books between 1980 and 2000. Between that time, it conducted 160 art exhibitions, 192 conferences, in addition to conducting 40 international meetings across the world. Within the scope of its objectives, the organisation has published books on the history and cultures of Turkic, Central Asia, South Asia, Southeast Asia, the Balkans, Caucasus, Eastern Europe, and African Muslim.

It has published books on the history of Turkey titled Excluding the Ottoman State (Ankara 1994) and the Ottoman State and Civilization History (I-II, Istanbul 1994, 1998). The organisation conducted several conferences across the world that were subsequently turned into books. The history of Pakistan book titled Islam in South Asia, Islamabad 1995 was also published by the organisation. It has conducted conferences, later turned into books on various countries such as Malaysia and other Muslim countries. The history of Malaysia is covered by a book titled Islamic Civilization in the Malay World, Kuala Lumpur 1997 while the West Africa's civilization is covered by Islamic Civilization in West Africa in Dakar in 1996, Islamic Civilization in the Caucasus published in 1998 and Islamic Civilization in the Balkans published in 2000. Science and Education in the Ottoman World book was published.

The research centre has written a bibliography of translations of the Quran which into 65 different languages. Done between 1515 and 1980, all copies of manuscript were published in Istanbul, 2000. Its audio translation has also been distributed into various languages such as Wolof language, Hevsâ, Tamasheq, Songhay, Kanuri and Fula languages.

A book titled Calligraphy in the Islamic Cultural Heritage was published in 1992 which was later printed in Turkish, Arabic, Japanese, English, and Malay languages. Islamic Architecture in Bosnia and Herzegovina concerning culture of Bosnia and Herzegovina was published in 1994, The Old Bridge (Stari Most) in Mostar (Istanbul 1995), Studije o Bosni, and Historijski Prilozi iz Osmansko-Turskog Perioda was published in 1994, in addition to publishing books titled Population of Bosnia in the Ottoman Period, 1994. The End of the 19th Century in Bosnia was published in 1996, concerning disestablishments of Ottoman Empire in Bosnia.

== Headquarters and buildings ==
IRCICA was initially headquartered in Fatih, Istanbul. It served its headquarters from its 1979 until July 2017. The organisation was relocated to Yıldız Palace, Istanbul. The president of Turkey allocated five buildings for the organisation in Istanbul. Yıldız Palace was the last palace of the Ottoman Empire. Other buildings donated by the government of Turkey are; Seyir Pavilion, Çit Qasr, Yaveran Qasr and Silahhane (armoury) Building. Çit Qasr was allotted in 1982 and Yaveran Qasr in 1984. Both Çit Qasr and Yaveran Qasr were either redesigned, restore or reconstructed by the organisation by raising funds contributed by the states and individuals.

Silahhane Building has been its library which was restored by funds granted by the prime minister of the United Arab Emirates and Emir of Dubai, Mohammed bin Rashid Al Maktoum. It was formally inaugurated as a library of the organisation by the president of Turkey, the then prime minister of Turkey Recep Tayyip Erdoğan on 17 May 2009.

Bab-ı Ali Complex, headquarters of the IRCICA was moved from Yıldız Palace to Fatih. As of July 2017, Fatih district serves headquarters of the organisation. The building previously served as a repository of the Ottoman archives until 2014 after the president of Turkey allotted the building to IRCICA. Sublime Porte serves as Directorate General as well as exhibition hall of IRCICA. Other four buildings houses the department of research, library and documentation, department of finance and administration.

The main conference hall of Sublime Porte is used by the organisation as its library.

== Awards establishment ==
The IRCICA has been distributing awards to those who have made significant contribution to the IRCICA cultural heritage and education. Sultan bin Muhammad Al-Qasimi was one of the recipients of IRCICA's award.

It also conducts the International Calligraphy Competition award ceremony which is awarded to calligraphers who participate in the ceremony. The ninth competition held in 2013 involved in different writing styles such as jaly thuluth, thuluth, and naskh among others.

A Turkish calligrapher Seyit Amhet Depeler achieved 1st position, while 2nd was Abdah Muhammad Hasan Al-Camal from Egypt and Ehab Ebraheem Thabet from Palestine was nominated as the 3rd winner.

== See also ==
- Statistical, Economic and Social Research and Training Centre for Islamic Countries
- International Islamic Fiqh Academy
- Islamic World Educational, Scientific and Cultural Organization
