= Russian Islamic University =

University in Kazan, Tatarstan, Russia

Coordinates: 55°46′11″N 49°08′50″E

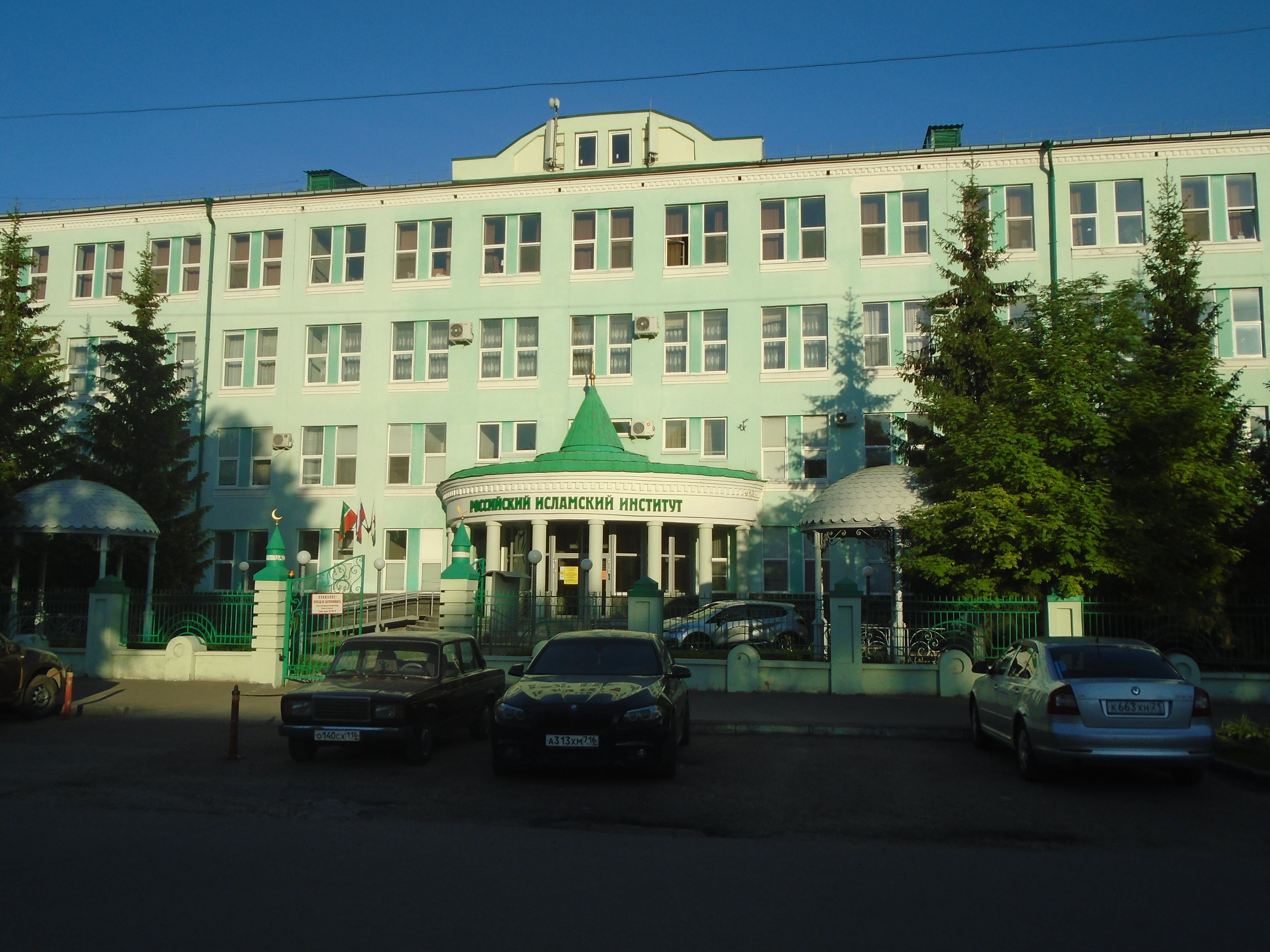
- Type: university
- Established: 1998
- Location: Kazan, Tatarstan, Russia

The Russian Islamic University is Russia's first official Islamic university. It was founded in 1998 in Kazan, Tatarstan. The university consists of three departments (theology, Islamic science and Hafiz preparation) and four sub-departments (humanitarian, Islamic law, Islamic theology and philology). In 2008 the university had around 70 faculty and more than 400 students. The university changed its status to Islamic institute in 2009.

== See also ==
- List of Islamic educational institutions
- Federation of the Universities of the Islamic World
