= Ahmad Karima =

Egyptian Islamic law professor

Ahmad Mahmoud Karima أحمد محمود كريمة
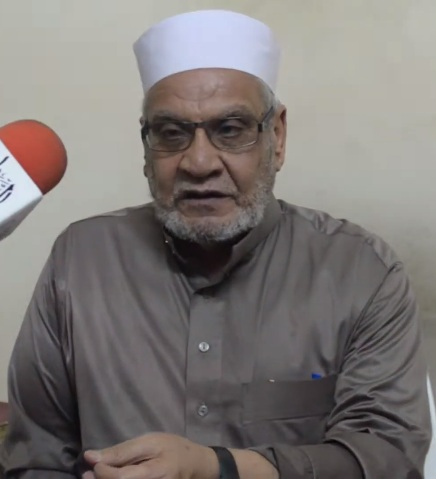
- Ahmad Karima interviewed by Zaman News on 30 July 2017

Personal life
- Born: 2 June 1951 (age 75) Giza Governorate, Egypt
- Main interest(s): Aqidah, Tawhid, Fiqh (Islamic jurisprudence), Usul al-Fiqh, Usul al-Din, Islamic studies
- Notable work: Al-Salafiyya bayna al-Aseel wa al-Dakheel

Religious life
- Religion: Islam
- Denomination: Sunni
- Jurisprudence: Maliki
- Creed: Ash'ari

Muslim leader
- Influenced by: Malik ibn Anas Abdel-Halim Mahmoud

Ahmad Mahmoud Karima (Arabic: أحمد محمود كريمة), professor of Islamic law and comparative jurisprudence at Al-Azhar University, is best known for his religious moderation and condemnations of radicalism, and for his intense criticism of the Salafi-Wahhabi movement, and the Muslim Brotherhood group.

He declared after the 2016 international conference on Sunni Islam in Grozny that "If the world is looking forward to uprooting terrorism, it has to stand up against Wahhabism because they are the root of all sedition and conflict."

== Books ==
Among his well-known writings are:

- Al-Salafiyya bayna al-Aseel wa al-Dakheel (Arabic: السلفية بين الأصيل والدخيل, lit. 'Salafism between the Authentic and the Intrusions').
- Gama'at al-Ikhwan (Arabic: جماعة الإخوان, lit. 'The Muslim Brotherhood Group').

== See also ==
- Ahmad al-Tayyeb
- Ali Gomaa
- Ali al-Jifri
- List of Ash'aris and Maturidis
- 2016 international conference on Sunni Islam in Grozny
