= Maturidism =

School of theology in Sunni Islam

Maturidism (Arabic: المَاتُريدِيَّةُ, romanized: al-Māturīdiyya) is a school of theology in Sunni Islam named after Abu Mansur al-Maturidi. It is one of the three creeds of Sunni Islam alongside Ash'arism and Atharism, and prevails in the Hanafi school of jurisprudence.

Al-Maturidi codified and systematized the theological Islamic beliefs already present among the Ḥanafite Muslim theologians of Balkh and Transoxiana under one school of systematic theology (kalām); Abu Hanifa emphasized the use of rationality and theological rationalism regarding the interpretation of the sacred scriptures of Islam.

Maturidism was originally circumscribed to the region of Transoxiana in Central Asia but it became the predominant theological orientation amongst the Sunnī Muslims of Persia before the Safavid conversion to Shīʿīsm in the 16th century, and the Ahl al-Ra'y (people of reason). It enjoyed a preeminent status in the Ottoman Empire and Timurid Empire. Outside the old Ottoman and Timurid empires, most Turkic tribes, Hui people, Central Asian, and South Asian Muslims also follow the Maturidi theology. There have also been Arab Maturidi scholars.

== History ==
The history of the Maturidi School is characterized by three phases. The phase lasted until the end of the 10th century, and is characterized by the fact that nothing of importance happened for the development of the school. Al-Maturidi had many followers; of them the most important is Abū Salama al-Samarqandī, who gave us the summary of Al- Maturidi's Kitab Al Tawhid namely the Jumal Usul al-dīn.

== Qur‘anic hermeneutics ==
Al-Maturidi distinguishes between exegesis (tafsir) and interpretation (ta‘wil). The exegesis deals with the question about the meaning of a Qur‘anic verse as understood by the first audience (i.e. the sahaba). Because they were present during the revelation, so Maturidi, they knew the circumstances of the affairs.

Only then, the true meaning of the verse would be knowable. The task of the scholars is to formulate these ideas receivable for a new audience, which is the interpretation.

== Beliefs and creed ==
Al-Maturidi, being a follower of the Hanafi school of Islamic jurisprudence, based his theological opinions and epistemological perspectives on the teachings of the school's eponymous founder, Abu Hanifa (8th century CE).

The Maturidi school of Islamic theology holds that:

- All the attributes of God are eternal, distinct, and also inseparable from God.
- Ethics have an objective existence and humans are capable of recognizing it through reason alone.
- Although humans are intellectually capable of realizing God, they need revelations and guidance of prophets and messengers, because human desire can divert the intellect and because certain knowledge of God has been specially given to these prophets (e.g. the Quran was revealed to Muhammad according to Islam, who Muslims believe was given this special knowledge from God and only through Muhammad did this knowledge become accessible to others).
- Humans are free in determining their actions within scope of God-given possibilities. Accordingly, God has created all possibilities, but humans are free to choose.
- The Six articles of faith.
- Religious authorities need reasonable arguments to prove their claims.
- Support of science and falsafa (philosophy).
- The Maturidites state that imān (faith) does not increase nor decrease depending on one's deeds; it's rather taqwā (piety) which increases and decreases.
- The Maturidites emphasize the importance of monotheism and the transcendence of God (tanzih).

Regarding ʿaqīdah (creed), unlike many Mu'tazilites (free-will theology), al-Maturidi does not hold that angels are necessarily infallible. Pointing at surah al-Baqara, he notes that angels too, have been tested. Referring to surah al-Anbiyāʼ, he points out, angels who claim divinity for themselves are sentenced to hell. About Iblīs, otherwise known as Satan, he states, disputing whether he was an angel or a jinn before his fall is useless as it is more important to know, that he has become a devil and enemy of humans.

Maturidism holds that humans are creatures endowed with reason, which differentiates them from animals. The relationship between people and God differs from that of nature and God; humans are endowed with free-will, but due to God's sovereignty, God creates the acts the humans choose, so humans can perform them. Ethics can be understood just by rational thought and do not require prophetic guidance. Al-Maturidi also considered the aḥādīth to be unreliable when they are at odds with reason. Furthermore, Maturidi theology opposes anthropomorphism and similitude, but simultaneously does not deny the divine attributes.

Maturidism defends the idea that paradise and hell are coexisting with the temporal world, against the assertion of some Muʿtazila that paradise and hell will be created only after the Day of Judgement. The attributes of paradise and hell would already take effect on this world (dunya). Abū l-Laiṯ as-Samarqandī (944–983 CE) stated that the purpose of simultaneous existence of both worlds is that they inspire hope and fear among humans.

== Concept of faith ==
Al-Maturidi's doctrine, primarily based on Ḥanafī theology and jurisprudence, asserted man's capacity and will alongside the supremacy of God in man's acts, providing a doctrinal framework for more flexibility and adaptability. Maturidism especially flourished and spread among the Muslim populations in Central Asia from the 10th century onwards.

According to Maturidism, belief (ʾīmān) does neither increase nor decrease depending on observation of religious law. Instead, deeds follow from faith. Based on Surah Ṭā Hā (verse 112), if a Muslim does not perform the deeds prescribed by the Islamic law (sharīʿa), he is not considered an apostate as long as he doesn't deny his obligations. According to al-Maturidi, faith isn't based on actions or confession, but comes from the heart. He supports his doctrine by referring to Surah al-ʿImrān (Quran 3:22): "They are the ones whose deeds have become worthless in this world and the Hereafter, and for them there will be no helpers." These people would have performed the obligatory actions and rituals without the proper faith in their heart. Therefore, actions must be based on faith to be acceptable before God. Maturidism is known for its reserved position regarding takfir: Based on Quran 2:30, Kitāb al-ʿĀlim states that neither humans nor angels can know what is in the heart of a human, thus it couldn't be said who is inwardly a Muslim and who is not, except for those who commit acts of disbelief. One who is committing sins isn't necessarily a disbeliever, but someone who explicitly dissociates themselves from God is.

Similarly, it is argued that the obedience to God observed by angels and prophets derives from their insights to God's nature and doesn't result from their creation. Abū al-Qāsim Ishaq ibn Muhammad al Maturidi (9th to 10th centuries CE) drew an analogy on Harut and Marut, who are regarded as sinful yet not unbelievers (Kuffār) in the Islamic tradition. Al-Samarqandī further stated that children cannot be considered unbelievers and all of them go to paradise. According to al-Maturidi, human rationality is supposed to acknowledge the existence of a creator deity (bāriʾ) solely based on rational thought and independently from divine revelation. He shared this conviction with his teacher and predecessor Abū Ḥanīfa al-Nuʿmān (8th century CE), whereas the 10th-century Muslim scholar and theologian Abū al-Ḥasan al-Ashʿarī never held such a view. Although Māturīdism adheres, like the Mu'tazilites, to ethical realism, the former holds that moral objects are ultimately created by God, thus God is not bound by them, but human reason can detect such moral truths on their own.

Yohei Matsuyama points to al-Maturidi's wording about faith, referring to the only obligation to believe in a creator (bāriʾ) or maker (sanī), not specifically in Allah, and concludes, it is only necessary for salvation to construct a belief in a creator, not necessarily accepting the theological or doctrinal formulations of Islam. Toshihiko Izutsu likewise argues that "believing in Islam" refers to submission to the creator, by voluntarily surrendering to his will, and not necessarily accepting a religious formula.

Yet, al-Maturidi did not view all religions as equal. He criticized Christians, Jews, Zoroastrians, and atheists or materialists (Dahrīya). However, he drew a distinction between other Abrahamic monotheistic religions and non-Abrahamic non-monotheistic religions, criticizing Judaism and Christianity on the matter of prophecy and individual prophets, not about God. Dualistic religions faced criticism by al-Maturidi regarding their conception of God, arguing that an omnibenevolent deity, who creates only good, opposed to a devil, who is responsible for everything evil, implies a deficit in God's omnipotence and is incompatible with God's nature.

== Geographical spread ==
Due to its history with the Hanafi school of thought, Maturidism is found in all of countries that follow the Hanafi Madhhab. Maturidism was initially spread in the Eastern realms of the Islamic world, particularly in Samarqand and Transoxiana. It became widespread among Turkic peoples in Central Asia and was introduced into the Middle East with the coming of the Seljuks. It was popular among the Persians of eastern Khurasan and was the preferred school of the Central Asian and Ottoman Turks. From its Central Asian origins, it spread all over the lands of Islam, from Egypt in the west to China and India in the east. In this capacity, at least during the High Middle Ages. Wilferd Madelung explains the connection between the earlier Seljuk Turks, Hanafi law, and Maturidi theology:

As a result of the Turkish expansion, eastern Hanafism and Maturidi theological doctrine were spread throughout western Persia, 'Iraq, Anatolia, Syria and Egypt. Numerous Transoxianan and other eastern Hanafi scholars migrated to these regions and taught there from the late 5th/11th to the 8th/14th century. Maturidi doctrine thus gradually came to prevail among the Hanafi communities everywhere.

Currently, Maturidis are widespread in Afghanistan, Central Asia, Turkey, India, Pakistan, Bangladesh, the Balkans (specifically Bosnia, Albania, Kosovo and Skopje), northwestern China, the Levant (specifically Syria, Lebanon and Palestine), the Caucasus, Tatarstan, and Bashkortostan.

== See also ==
- 2020 International Maturidi Conference
- 2016 international conference on Sunni Islam in Grozny
- Athari
- Islamic schools and branches
- List of Maturidis
- Muʿtazila
- Ahmad Raza Khan
