= Muhammad Sayyid Tantawi =

Egyptian Islamic scholar (1928–2010)

- محمد سيد طنطاوي

Grand Imam of Al-Azhar
- In office 27 March 1996 – 10 March 2010
- Preceded by: Gad el-Haq Ali Gad el-Haq
- Succeeded by: Mohamed Ahmed el-Tayeb

Grand Mufti of Egypt
- In office 28 October 1986 – 27 March 1996
- Preceded by: Abd al-Latif Abd al-Ghani Hamzah
- Succeeded by: Nasr Farid Wasil

Personal details
- Born: 28 October 1928 Sohag, Egypt
- Died: 10 March 2010 (aged 81) Riyadh, Saudi Arabia
- Education: Al-Azhar University

Muhammad Sayyid Tantawi (Note: Arabic: محمد سيد طنطاوي, romanized: Muḥammad Sayyid Ṭanṭāwī) (28 October 1928 – 10 March 2010) was an Egyptian Islamic scholar who served as the grand mufti of Egypt from 1986 to 1996 and then as grand imam of al-Azhar from 1996 until his death in 2010.

== Early life ==
Muhammad Sayyid Tantawi was born on 28 October 1928 in the village of Selim el-Sharqiyah in the municipality of Tama, Sohag in Egypt. He joined the Alexandria Religious Institute in 1944. He graduated from Al-Azhar's faculty of religious studies in 1958 and went on to teach. In 1966, he was awarded a PhD in Hadith and Tafsir, exegesis of the Qur'an.

He became a member of the faculty of Ausol Aldeen in 1968 and a member of the faculty of Arabic & Islamic Studies at the Islamic University of Libya in 1972. In 1980 he moved to Saudi Arabia, where he became chief of the Tafsir branch of the Postgraduate studies branch at the Islamic University of Madinah. He returned to Egypt in 1985, when he became Dean of the Faculty of Ausol Aldeen at the prestigious Alexandria Religious Institute.

== Education ==
He obtained his first degree with honours, his master's degree in education in 1959 and his PhD in 1966. His doctoral thesis was on the children of Israel in al-Quran and al-Sunnah.

== Work ==
In 1986, Tantawi was appointed as Grand Mufti of Egypt on his 58th birthday, 28 October 1986. He held this position for almost ten years, until he was appointed Grand Imam of Al-Azhar Mosque and Grand Sheikh of Al-Azhar University by the President of Egypt, Hosni Mubarak, on 27 March 1996. The Al-Azhar Mosque is one of the most influential and important Sunni Muslim institutions.

Tantawi completed a seven thousand page exegesis of the Qur'an (Al-tafser al-waset). This Tafsir took over ten years to complete.

Tantawi led the funeral prayers at the funeral of Yasser Arafat in 2004, during which he said that "Arafat has done his duty as a defender of the Palestinian cause, with courage and honesty".

== Views and fatwas ==
=== Charging interest on loans ===
In 1989 the Egyptian government's support for Western-style, interest-based banks (long considered anathema by Muslim scholars as usury, or riba) was under siege by the expanding Islamic finance movement. In response to a government request for a ruling, Tantawi (then Grand Mufti of Egypt) issued a fatwa that described some forms of financial interest as tolerable- among them, those paid by government bonds and those on ordinary savings accounts. He declared that charging interest on such bank loans was in fact ribh, or just gaining profit, which was allowable. This eventually allowed the development of a mortgage industry. However, his ruling did not issue as an effectual decree. Tantawi's rationale was based on an interpretation of the Islamic sources as banning usury (an extreme and manipulative form of interest-taking) but not any and all comparable forms of gain.

His views on this issue have been very controversial among his fellow Muslim scholars. Despite years of friendship with Tantawi, well-known Egyptian scholar Yusuf al-Qaradawi has sharply criticized his position on interest.

=== Abortion ===
He issued a fatwa which allowed abortion in cases where a woman had become pregnant as a result of rape, though this created controversy and Mufti Ali Gomaa said Tantawi was wrong, and that irrespective of how the life was created, after 120 days an abortion becomes impermissible, (Note: 120 days is just over 17 weeks of pregnancy. In the United States 95% of abortions are carried out before the week 16.) forbidden.

=== Female circumcision ===
Tantawi opposed female circumcision calling it un-Islamic, especially in 1997, when he said "The ulema (theologians) of Islam are unanimous in agreeing that female circumcision has nothing to do with religion" and revealed his own daughter had not been circumcised.

=== Suicide bombings ===
Tantawi initially took a line against suicide bombings, and unlike his compatriot Yusuf al-Qaradawi, he condemned the use of suicide bombings against Israelis, rejecting the argument that all Israelis were legitimate targets, because at some stage they would all carry a gun. In 2003 he called suicide bombers "enemies of Islam", adding "people of different beliefs should co-operate and not get into senseless conflicts and animosity. Extremism is the enemy of Islam, whereas, jihad is allowed in Islam to defend one's land and to help the oppressed. The difference between jihad in Islam and extremism is like the earth and the sky" Tantawi, however, later the same year changed his position and said anybody blowing himself up in the face of the occupiers of his land is a martyr, in response to a question about the Islamic shari'ah stance over the Palestinians who blow up their bodies against the Israelis. He stressed, however, that Islam did not allow the killing of innocent civilians and children but only invaders and aggressors.

=== Female imams ===
Tantawi opposed women as Imams in mixed congregations during Friday prayers (Jumu'ah), saying when "A woman's body is private. When she leads men in prayer, in this case, it is not proper for them to look at the woman whose body is in front of them. Even if they see it in their daily life, it should not be in situations of worship, where the main point is humility and modesty." He also called Haidar Haidar's book, A Feast for the Seaweeds, blasphemous. In 2001 he issued a fatwa banning women from acting as surrogate mothers or from receiving frozen sperm from dead husbands.

=== Pope Benedict XVI Islam controversy ===
In response to the Pope Benedict XVI Islam controversy, he stated "We have no objection if the Pope holds another speech and declares publicly that what the Byzantine emperor had said was wrong. At the same time, the Pope has to apologize frankly and justify what he said".

=== Reaction to 9/11 attacks ===
Speaking after the September 11, 2001 attacks, Tantawi said "It's not courage in any way to kill an innocent person, or to kill thousands of people, including men and women and children." He said that Osama bin Laden's call for a Jihad against the west was "invalid and not binding on Muslims", adding "Killing innocent civilians is a horrific, hideous act that no religion can approve". He said the Qur'an "specifically forbids the kinds of things the Taliban and al-Qaeda are guilty of".

=== Egyptian niqab controversy ===
In October 2009, Tantawi launched a campaign against the niqab (the full-face veil which covers the entire body except for the eyes, increasingly worn by women in Egypt) by personally removing the niqab of a teenage girl (after she failed to remove it) at a secondary school affiliated to Al-Azhar University, which he was touring in Cairo's Madinet Nasr suburb, much to the shock of all concerned. He had asked the teenage girl to remove her veil saying: "The niqab is a tradition, it has no connection with religion." He then instructed the girl never to wear the niqab again and promised to issue a fatwa against its use in schools, saying he was determined to officially ban any person wearing the niqab from entering schools dependent on Al-Azhar University.

=== Jews ===
In the 1960s Tantawi wrote a 700-page treatise on the children of Israel in the Quran and Sunnah (Jews in the Qur'an and the Traditions), in which he summarized:

"[The] Qur'an describes the Jews with their own particular degenerate characteristics, i.e. killing the prophets of Allah, corrupting His words by putting them in the wrong places, consuming the people's wealth frivolously, refusal to distance themselves from the evil they do, and other ugly characteristics caused by their deep-rooted lasciviousness ... only a minority of the Jews keep their word. ... [A]ll Jews are not the same. The good ones become Muslims, the bad ones do not."

Tantawi also denied that the Western Wall had any Jewish significance and claimed, "All of the figures from the [Hebrew] Bible were Muslims."

=== Saudi Arabia ===
Tantawi believed that Saudi Arabia is the model country for respecting human rights stating in June 2000: "Saudi Arabia leads the world in the protection of human rights because it protects them according to the shari'a of God...Everyone knows that Saudi Arabia is the leading country for the application of human rights in Islam in a just and objective fashion, with no aggression and no prejudice."

=== Sex reassignment surgery ===
In 1988, Tantawi issued a fatwa regarding the sex reassignment surgery of Egyptian woman Sally Mursi. The statement summary is translated: "It is permissible to perform the operation in order to reveal what was hidden of male or female organs. Indeed, it is obligatory to do so on the grounds that it must be considered a treatment, when a trustworthy doctor advises it. It is, however, not permissible to do it at the mere wish to change sex from woman to man, or vice versa." The fatwa has been interpreted both as in favor and also in rejection of sex reassignment operations.

== Death ==
Tantawi died on the morning of 10 March 2010, at the age of 81, as result of a heart attack during a visit to Riyadh, Saudi Arabia. Tantawi died as he was about to board his return flight to Egypt at Riyadh's King Khaled International Airport. His heart attack came just after he fell whilst boarding the plane. Tantawi had just attended the prize-giving ceremony for the King Faisal International Prize for Service to Islam. He was officially pronounced dead at the Amir Sultan hospital.

Tantawi's death was unexpected and he was described as being in "excellent shape and health" prior to his trip. Egyptian authorities stated that, at his family's request, he would be buried in Medina in Saudi Arabia, which is also the burial place of Mohammed. His burial at the Jannatul Baqee cemetery took place after funeral prayers were held at the Prophet's Mosque. Tantawi's deputy, Mohamed Wasel, took over his duties until then President Mubarak appointed a replacement, Ahmed el-Tayeb, as the new rector of Al Azhar.

=== Condolences ===
Condolences were sent to the Egyptian government by several national leaders and scholars. These included Pope Benedict XVI, US President Barack Obama and Secretary of State Hillary Clinton; the Islamic Development Department of Malaysia (Jakim); King Mohammed VI of Morocco; King Abdullah II of Jordan, President Ali Abdullah Saleh of Yemen and President Ilham Aliyev of Azerbaijan.

== Public image ==
Tantawi, who died at the age of 81, was a moderate, sometimes progressive voice at the apex of Islamic scholarship during a period when such measured tones tended to be drowned out on the international scene by his more militant rivals. Ebrahim Moosa, an associate professor of Islamic studies at Duke University stated: "Tantawi was not only pro-Western, he was often pro-authority and did his best to satisfy such authority, even if it meant that he had to cut corners with the body of ethical and moral rulings in Islamic teachings [...] His fatwas were not often carefully argued and scripted. They lacked a granular discussion of complex and controversial issues, and often he would cherry-pick from the tradition without proper justification."

== Books ==
Amongst his books:

- Muʻāmalāt al-bunūk wa-aḥkāmuhā al-sharʻīya. Cairo: Dār Nahḍat Miṣr. 1998. ISBN 9770157899.

== See also ==
- Dar al-Ifta al-Misriyyah

== Notes ==
Sunni Islam titles
Preceded by Abd al-Latif Abd al-Ghani Hamzah	Grand Mufti of Egypt; 1986–1996	Succeeded by Nasr Farid Wasil
Preceded by Gad el-Haq Ali Gad el-Haq	Grand Imam of al-Azhar Mosque; 1996–2010	Succeeded by Ahmed El-Tayeb
