= Maryam Khatoon Molkara =

Iranian transgender activist (1950–2012)

- مریم خاتون ملک‌آرا
- Born: 1950; Abkenar, Gilan province, Imperial State of Iran
- Died: 25 March 2012 (age 62); Tehran, Iran
- Other names: Maryam Hatoon Molkara, Maryam Khatoonpour Molkara
- Known for: Transgender rights activism, first transgender person in Iran to legally undergo sex reassignment surgery

Maryam Khatoonpour Molkara (Persian: مریم خاتون ملک‌آرا; 1950–2012) was an Iranian transgender rights activist, and she was widely recognized as a matriarch of the transgender community in Iran. Designated male at birth, she was later instrumental in obtaining a letter which acted as a fatwa enabling sex reassignment surgery to exist as part of a legal framework. Molkara became the first transgender person in Iran to legally undergo sex reassignment surgery with the permission of Ayatollah Ruhollah Khomeini.

== Early life ==
Molkara was born with the name Fereydun in 1950, in the village of Abkenar in Gilan province, Imperial State of Iran. She was the only child of her father's second of eight wives. Her father was a landowner. Molkara said she always preferred clothes, toys, and activities that were traditionally for girls.

== Transition and advocacy ==
In her adolescence, Molkara went to parties dressed as a woman. She came out as transgender to her mother, who refused to accept her. This made Molkara decide to take feminizing hormones instead of immediately seeking out surgery. She also dressed and lived as a woman. In 1975, Molkara traveled to London to think about various possibilities, and it was there that she claimed she "learned about transsexuality and realized I was not a passive homosexual".

Gender changing surgeries had occurred in Iran as early as the 1930s, and the first female-to-male surgery was performed on 16 year-old Farhad Najafi in 1953. However, these were not commonplace and were for people with congenital intersex conditions. Molkara started to write letters to Ayatollah Ruhollah Khomeini, then in exile in Iraq, asking for religious advice about being assigned the wrong gender at birth. In one of these letters, she said that her gender had been clear since she was two years old, as she used to apply chalk to her face to imitate putting on makeup. Khomeini had already written in 1963 that corrective surgeries for intersex people are not against Islamic law, and his answer was based on this existing idea rather than developing a new fatwa for transgender people. He suggested that she live as a woman, which included dressing as one. Thereafter, she met with Empress Farah Pahlavi, who gave her support to Molkara and other transgender individuals wanting sex reassignment surgery. In 1978, Molkara traveled to Paris where Khomeini was then based to try to make him aware of transgender rights, but failed to meet him.

Following the Iranian Revolution, Molkara started to face intense backlash due to her identity. She underwent arrests and death threats. She was fired from her job at the Iranian National Radio and Television, forced to wear masculine clothing, injected with male hormones against her will, and detained in a psychiatric institution. Because of good contacts with religious leaders, among them Akbar Hashemi Rafsanjani, she was released. At the start of the Iran–Iraq War, Molkara volunteered as a nurse on the front lines. She said that some of the men she treated assumed she was a woman due to her gentleness.

Molkara continued to campaign for her right to get gender-affirming surgery. In 1986 or 1987, she confronted Khomeini in his home in Northern Tehran. She wore a man's suit, carried the Quran, and she tied shoes around her neck. This was a reference to the Ashura festival, and also indicated that she was looking for refuge. Molkara was held back and beaten by security guards until Khomeini's brother, Hassan Pasandide, intervened. He took Molkara into his house, where she pleaded her case, yelling "I'm a woman, I'm a woman!" His security guards were suspicious about her chest, as they thought she could be carrying explosives. She revealed they were her breasts, as she developed them using hormone therapy. Having heard her story, Ahmad Khomeini was touched and took Molkara to speak to his father, where he asked three of his doctors about the surgery in an attempt to make a well-informed decision. Khomeini then decided that sex reassignment surgery was needed to allow her to carry out her religious duties. This resulted in Khomeini issuing a fatwa, where he determined sex reassignment surgery to not be against Islamic law. Molkara lobbied for the according medical knowledge and procedures to be implemented in Iran, and worked on helping other transgender people have access to surgeries.

She completed her gender-affirming surgery in Thailand in 1997, due to "unhappiness with procedures in her native country''. The Iranian government paid for her surgery, and she was able to help establish government funding for many other transgender individual's surgeries. Although Molkara was not the first transgender Iranian to complete sex-change surgery, she was the first to receive a religious verdict from an influential Shia marja' in this regard.

In 2007, she founded and subsequently ran the Iranian Society to Support Individuals with Gender Identity Disorder (ISIGID, انجمن; Persian: حمایت از بیماران مبتلا به اختلالات هویت جنسی ایران), the first state-approved organization for transgender rights in Iran. Before this, she used her own property in Karaj to help other transgender people receive legal advice and medical care, including post-operative care. She continued advocating for other transgender people and bailing them out of prison after they were arrested, even knowing she would likely face violence for doing so.

== Death ==
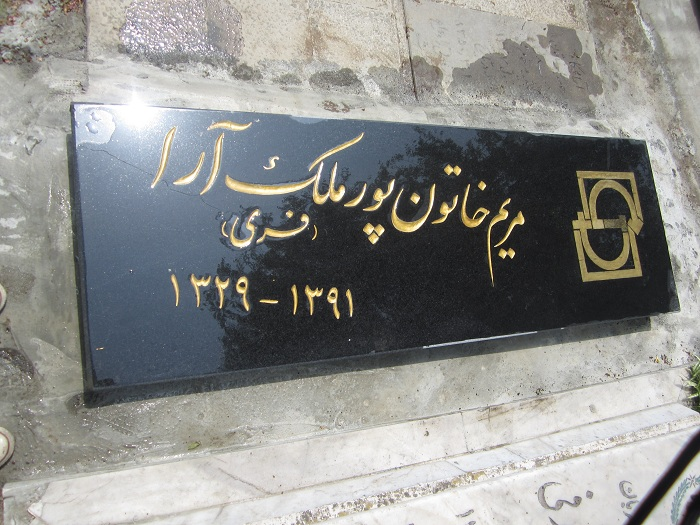
Tombstone at the grave of Maryam Khatoon Molkara

Molkara died in April 2012, after suffering a heart attack at the age of 62.

== See also ==
- Forced detransition
- LGBT rights in Iran
- Sally Mursi
- Transgender rights in Iran
