= Dar al-Ifta al-Misriyyah =

Egyptian Islamic advisory body

Coordinates: 30°02′44″N 31°16′12″E

Dar al-Ifta al-Misriyya (Arabic: دار الإفتاء المصرية, romanized: Dār al-Iftā' al-Miṣriyya) is an Egyptian Islamic advisory, justiciary and governmental body established as a centre for Islam and Islamic legal research in Egypt in 1313 AH / 1895 CE. It offers Muslims religious guidance and advice through the issuing of fatwas on everyday and contemporary issues.

Dār al-Iftā' draws upon the Qur’an, hadith, and precedents of Islamic jurists throughout history to deliver fatwas on topics relevant to contemporary Muslims. Its fatwas are influential among Sunni Muslims in Egypt and across the world.

== Status of Dar al-Ifta ==
Since it was first established, Egypt's Dar al-Ifta has been the premier institute to represent Islam and the international flagship for Islamic legal research. It fulfills its historic and civil role by keeping contemporary Muslim in touch with religious principles, clarifying the right way, removing doubts concerning religious and worldly life, and revealing religious laws for new issues of contemporary life. Throughout the 20th century, Dar al-Ifta has been described as a "central player" in Islam in Egyptian society.

Islamic jurisprudence in Egypt has been most closely identified with three institutions: Al-Azhar University, Dar al-Ifta and courts of law that adjudicate matters. It plays a significant role in giving rulings to the masses and consultation for the judiciary in Egypt.

Dar al-Ifta was established in 1895. As with Al-Azhar, it operated with state support but also had a degree of autonomy. It began advising state agencies in various Islamic matters, a role that was previously held by the Hanafi chief mufti.

Egypt's Dar al-Ifta started as one of the divisions of the Egyptian Ministry of Justice. In view of its consultancy role, capital punishment sentences among others are referred to the Egypt's Dar al-Ifta seeking the opinion of the Grand Mufti concerning these punishments. The role of Dar al-Ifta does not stop at this point; it is not limited by domestic boundaries but extends beyond Egypt covering the entire Islamic world.

This leading role is best expressed by its records of fatwas from its inception until the present day. Dar al-Ifta receives inquires from all over the Islamic world, as well as foreign students of Islamic law for training. This leadership developed from Dar al-Ifta's role as scholarly reference and for adopting a moderate methodology in understanding rulings derived from the inherited Fiqh (Eng. Jurisprudence) creating a consistency between Islamic law and the needs of the society. Dar al-Ifta issues 500–1000 fatwas a year.

In keeping with the immense developments in the field of communications, Dar al-Ifta undertakes significant responsibilities, and tasks necessitated by the qualitative shift brought about by the new era of communication and transport technologies.

== Fatawa Islamiyah ==
Starting in 1980 (1400 AH), Dar al-Ifta began publishing Fatawa Islamiyah ("The Islamic Fatwas from the Dar al-Ifta). The content of the publications are supervised by the Supreme Council for Islamic Affairs. -The first volume laid out the plan to deal with fiqh in general, but special issues were to be published on waqf and inheritance. The Fatawa Islamiyah were published in cycles, covering all the traditional fiqh issues in a time period before moving to the next time period. The cycles were organized as such:

1. Volumes 1 to 4: covered 703 rulings, spanning all traditional fiqh disciplines from 1895 to 1950.
2. Volumes 5 to 7: covered 413 rulings, spanning all traditional fiqh disciplines from 1950 to 1978.
3. Volumes 8 to 10: covered 209 rulings, mainly focusing on Gad al-Haq's rulings from 1978 to 1982.
4. Volumes 11 to 13: covering 379 rulings focused on waqf, spanning 1895 to 1982.
5. Volumes 14 to 19: covering 1572 rulings focused on inheritance, spanning 1895 to 1982.
6. Volume 20: return to covering all traditional fiqh disciplines, spanning 1982–1986.

== Grand Muftis ==
- Shaykh Hassunah al-Nawawi (1895–1899)
- Imam Shaykh Muhammad Abduh (1899–1905)
- Shaykh Abdel Kader El Rafei (Nov 1905)
- Shaykh Bakri al-Sadafi (1905–1914)
- Shaykh Muhammad Bakhit al-Muti'i (1914–1920)
- Shaykh Muhammad Isma`il al-Bardisi (Jul 1920 – Nov 1920)
- Shaykh `Abd al-Rahman Qurra`ah (1921–1928)
- Shaykh `Abd al-Majid Salim (1928–1945)
- Shaykh Hasanayn Muhammad Makhluf (1946–1950)
- Shaykh Yaseer Abdullah Al-Iskandariy (1950–1953)
- Shaykh Mohammad Hashim Al-Mishri (1953–1960)
- Shaykh Ahmad Muhammad `Abd al-`Al Haridi (1960–1970)
- Shaykh Muhammad Khatir Muhhammad al-Shaykh (1970–1978)
- Shaykh Jad al-Haqq `Ali Jad al-Haqq (1978–1982)
- Shaykh `Abd al-Latif `Abd al-Ghani Hamzah (1982–1985)
- Dr. Muhammad Sayyid Tantawy (1986–1996)
- Dr. Nasr Farid Wasil (1996–2002)
- Dr. Mohamed Ahmed el-Tayeb (2002–2003)
- Professor Dr. Ali Gomaa (Sep 2003 – Feb 2013)
- Shaykh Shawki Ibrahim Abdel-Karim Allam (Feb 2013–2024)
- Shaykh Nazir Ayyad (since 2024)
