= Shawki Allam =

Grand Mufti of Egypt

Dr. Shawki Ibrahim Abdel-Karim Allam
- شوقي إبراهيم عبد الكريم علام
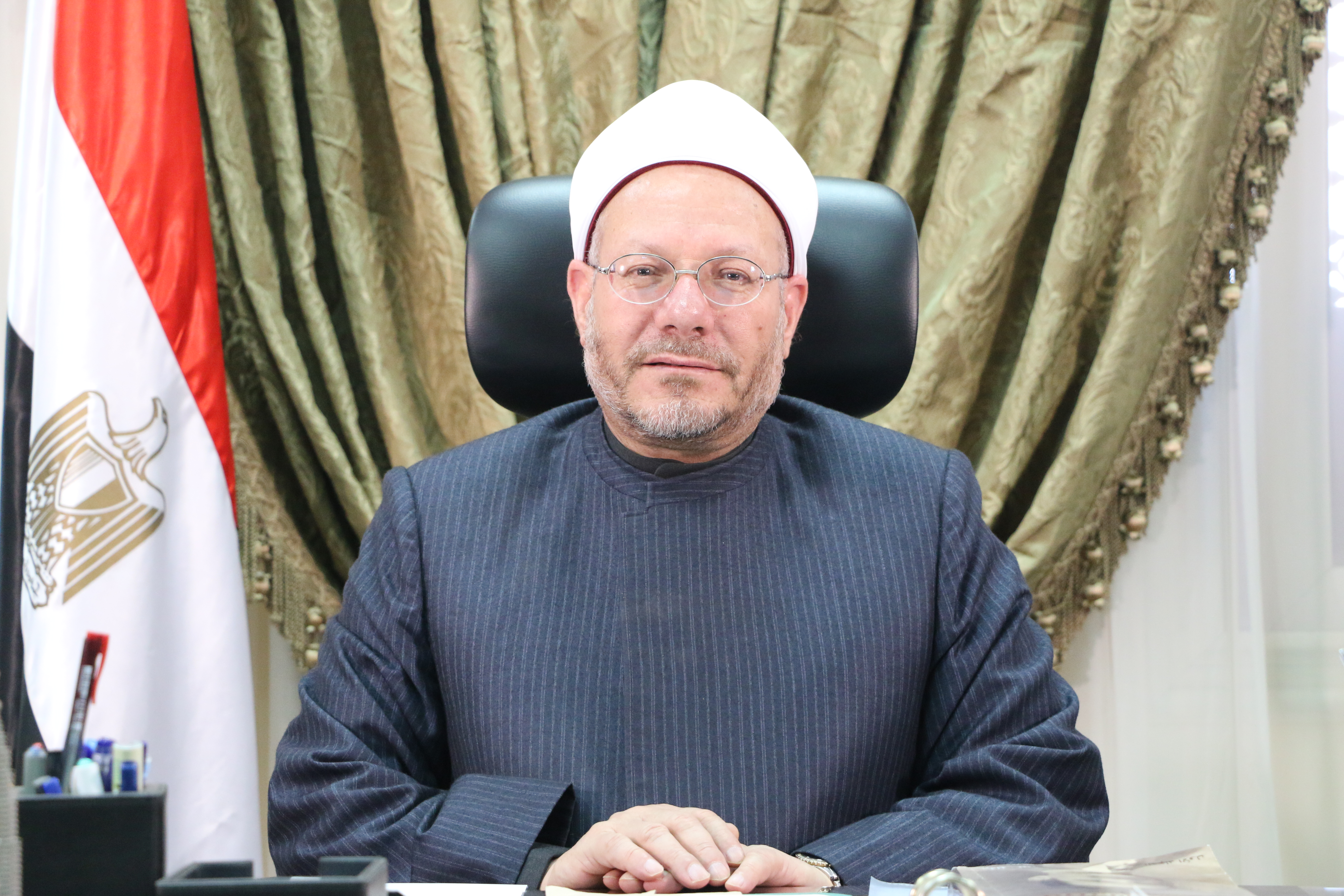

Grand Mufti of Egypt
- In office February 2013 – 11 August 2024
- President: Mohamed Morsi; Adly Mansour (acting); Abdel Fattah el-Sisi
- Preceded by: Ali Gomaa
- Succeeded by: Nazir Ayyad

Personal details
- Born: August 12, 1961 (age 65) El Delengat, Beheira, Egypt
- Education: Al Azhar University (PhD, 1996)

Shawki Ibrahim Abdel-Karim Allam (Arabic: شوقي إبراهيم عبد الكريم علام) (Note: Final ى (yāʾ) is commonly spelled in Egypt without dots, hence شوقى.) (Note: pronounced [ˈʃæwʔi (ʔe)brɑˈhiːm ʕæbdelkæˈriːm ʕælˈlæːm].) is an Egyptian theologian and cleric who served as the 19th Grand Mufti of Egypt through Dar al-Ifta al-Misriyyah from 2013 to 2024. He was succeeded by Nazir Ayyad on the 11th of August 2024, following a presidential decree.

== Biography ==
Allam was born in the Nile Delta governorate of Beheira on 12 August 1961. He received his PhD in 1996 from the Al-Azhar University in Jurisprudence and Sharia law. Before his appointment, he served as the chairman of the Department of Jurisprudence at the School of Sharia at Al-Azhar University's Tanta branch. Allam is a Sufi.

== Appointment ==
In February 2013, he was elected by Al Azhar's Council of Senior Scholars replacing outgoing grand Mufti, 61-year-old Ali Gomaa. The bylaws of Al-Azhar say the new Grand Mufti must be under the age of 60, have worked continuously inside the religious establishment following his education, be a scholar of both Jurisprudence and Sharia law, and be fluent in a second language other than Arabic. This makes the first time that the Grand Mufti has been elected by Islamic scholars rather than appointed by the president.

The position of Grand Mufti is seen as very influential in Egypt as well as throughout the Arab and Islamic world. The Grand Mufti is the government's first and primary source of religious authority, is seen as the symbolic religious representative of the government, and is able to issue fatwas on religious matters.

His office, the Dar al-Ifta al-Misriyyah (literally, the house of fatwas of Egypt), a government agency charged with issuing religious legal opinions on any question to Muslims who ask for them, issues some 5,000 fatwas a week, including both the official ones that he himself crafts on important issues and the more routine ones handled via phone and Internet by a dozen or so subordinate muftis.

In addition to issuing fatwas, the Grand Mufti of Egypt is responsible under Egyptian law for reviewing all death sentences in Egypt.

== Positions ==
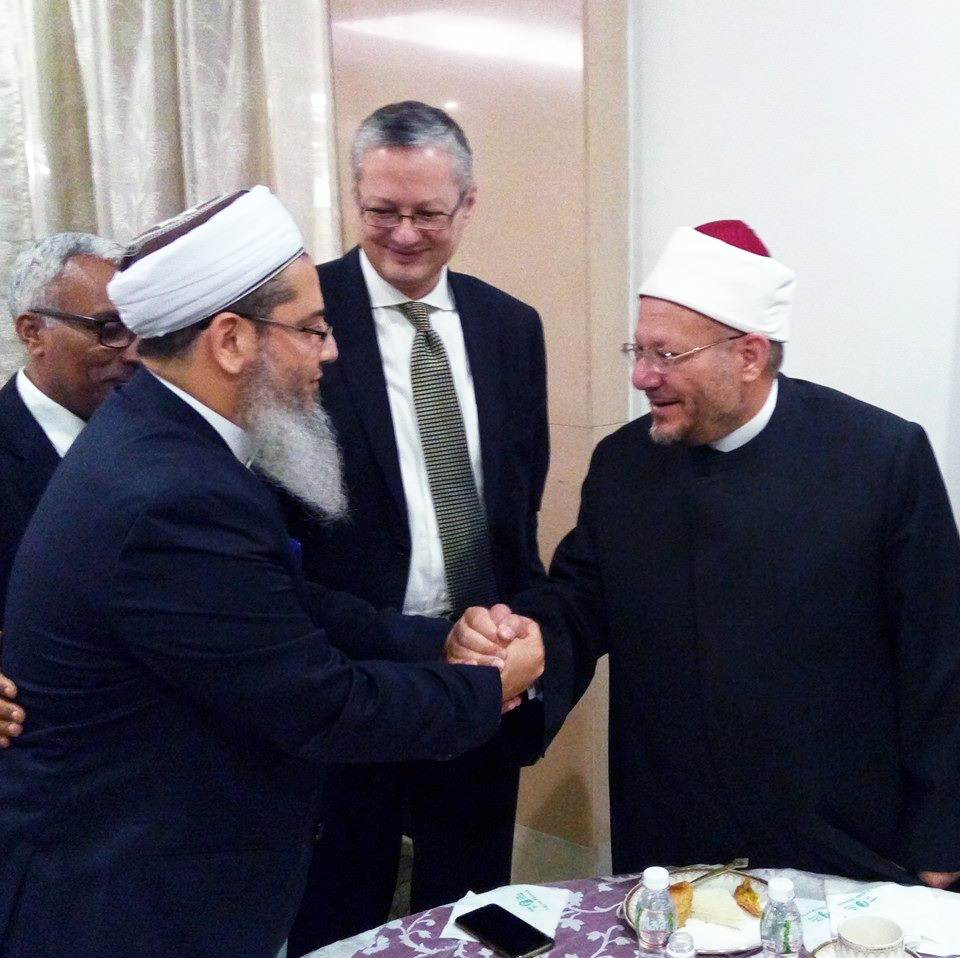
Shawki 'Allam with Sayed Tanveer Hashmi during the World Sufi Forum in New Delhi.

Allam is known as a moderate who renounces fanaticism and does not have any political allegiances. In March 2013, he issued a statement warning that any attack on the Al-Azhar Institution or its head, the Grand Imam Sheikh Ahmed El-Tayeb "undermines Egypt's security" and called on all complaints against Al-Azhar "to be addressed with legitimate and peaceful means." This announcement came after 500 students fell ill with food poisoning in a dormitory at Al Azhar University. In April 2013, Al Azhar University's Council of Senior Scholars decided to hold elections to replace Al-Azhar University president Usama al-Abd after the same incident.

Contrary to the majority of Muslim scholars, Allam believes Muslims can keep dogs as pets.

== See also ==
- 2016 international conference on Sunni Islam in Grozny
- List of Sufis
- List of Ash'aris

== Notes ==
Sunni Islam titles
Preceded by Ali Gomaa	Grand Mufti of Egypt; 2013-2024	Succeeded by Nazir Ayyad
