= Sayed Tanveer Hashmi =

Indian Sufi Islamic scholar and religious leader

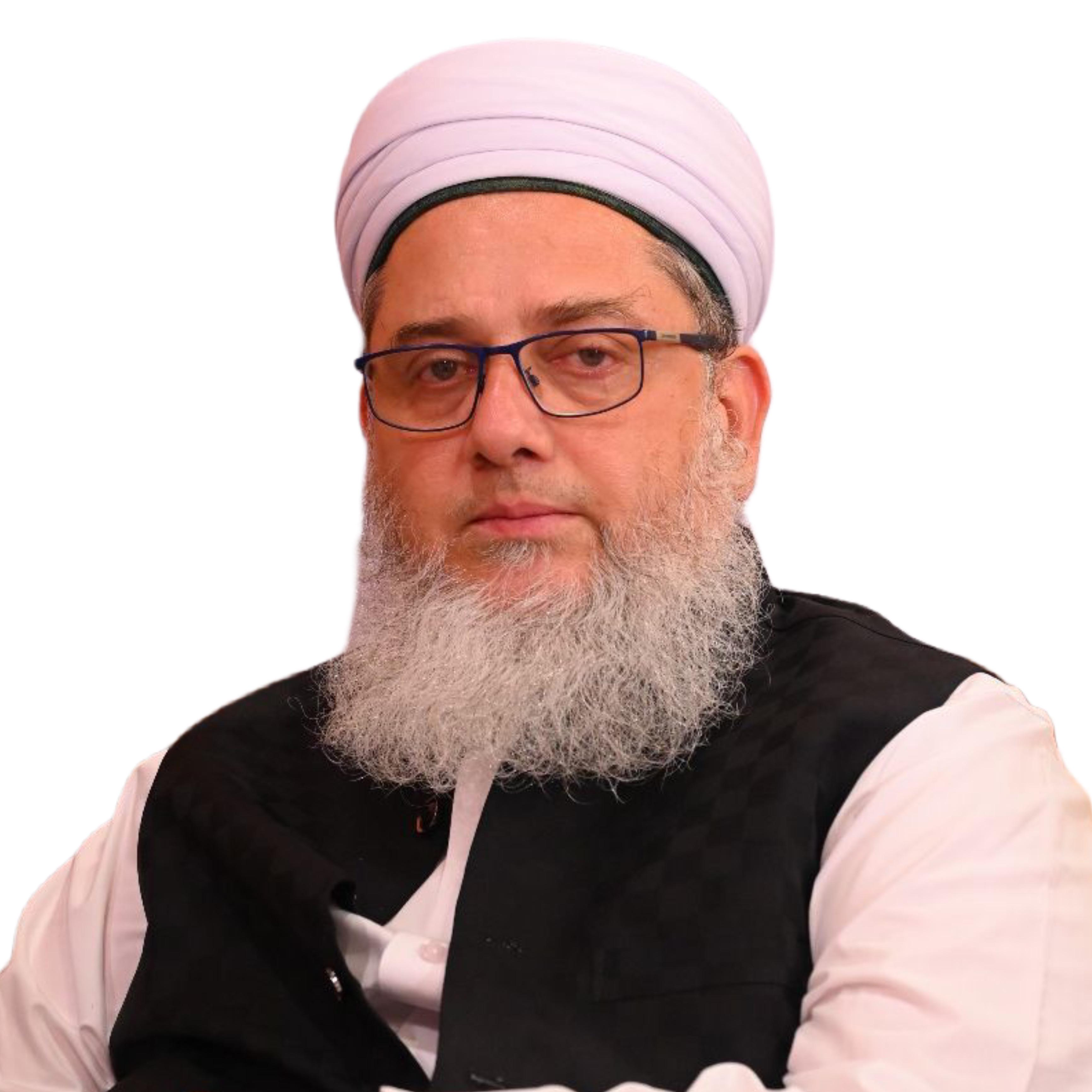
- Born: 22 November 1972 (age 53); Bijapur, Karnataka, India
- Other names: Tanveer-e-Millat; Tanveer Peera; Maulana Tanveer Hashmi
- Education: Karnatak University
- Occupations: Sufi religious leader; President, Al Hashmi Educational Welfare & Charitable Trust; Vice President, All India Ulema and Mashaikh Board
- Known for: President of Jamaat-e-Ahle Sunnat Karnataka; Sajjada nashin of Bijapur Sharif
- Children: 3

Sayed Mohiuddin Hussaini Peerzade, better known as Sayed Tanveer Hashmi, is an Indian Sufi religious leader based at Bijapur Sharif, a Sufi shrine in Vijayapura (Bijapur), Karnataka. He heads several Sunni Muslim organisations in Karnataka and Bijapur and holds office in a national Sufi Sunni body.

== Positions held ==
- Jamaat-e-Ahle Sunnat Karnataka (JASK) — State President; he founded the organisation, which works for the socio-educational upliftment of Sunni Muslims in Karnataka.
- All India Ulema and Mashaikh Board (AIUMB) — National Vice President of this apex body representing Sunni Sufi Muslims across India; AIUMB's own website has also described him as its Karnataka President.
- Muslim Muttahida Council (MMC) — Founder-President of this Bijapur-based consortium of Muslim organisations.
- Al Hashmi Educational Welfare & Charitable Trust — Founder-President, overseeing educational institutions that combine Islamic and mainstream schooling, including Jamia Hashimpeer and Al Hashmi Academy.
- All India Muslim Personal Law Board (AIMPLB) — General Member.

== Lineage ==
Hashmi traces his spiritual lineage to Hashim Peer Dastagir (also called Qutbul Aqtab Hashimpeer, d. 1646 CE), a Qadri Shattari Sufi saint whose shrine, Bijapur Sharif, he now presides over. According to family and shrine tradition, Hashim Peer was born around 1576–77 in Ahmedabad into the family of a judge, Qazi Burhan al-Din, and was raised under the influence of Sayed Shah Wajihuddin Hussaini Gujarati (Haider Ali Sani), a khalifa of Muhammad Ghawth. He is said to have settled in Bijapur during the reign of Ibrahim Adil Shah II, whom tradition credits him with steering away from practices considered un-Islamic. Hashmi's family identifies its lineage with Ahl al-Bayt; his formal name within the order's shajra (spiritual genealogy) is given as Syed Mohiuddin Hussaini Hashmi al-Qadri.

== Organisational activities ==
Hashmi founded Jamaat-e-Ahle Sunnat Karnataka (JASK), a Sunni Muslim body registered in Bengaluru. JASK has positioned itself as a representative voice for Sunni Muslims in Karnataka and was among the petitioners challenging India's triple talaq legislation before the Supreme Court.

Through the All India Ulema and Mashaikh Board, Hashmi has represented Sufi Sunni interests at the national level. In September 2021 he joined AIUMB founder-president Syed Mohammad Ashraf Kichhowchhvi and other office-bearers at a meeting in New Delhi with the ambassadors of Turkey, Egypt, Iran, Iraq, Indonesia and Jordan, at which the delegation argued that terrorism has no basis in Islamic teaching and that Sufism counters extremism through moral example rather than confrontation. He has also taken part in AIUMB-organised events promoting Sufi and Sunni scholarship, including the unveiling, jointly hosted by AIUMB and JASK, of a commentary on the classical hadith text Khasais-e-Ali at the India Islamic Cultural Centre in New Delhi, an event attended by the ambassadors of Turkey, Iraq and Iran and the consul-general of Indonesia.

== Activism ==
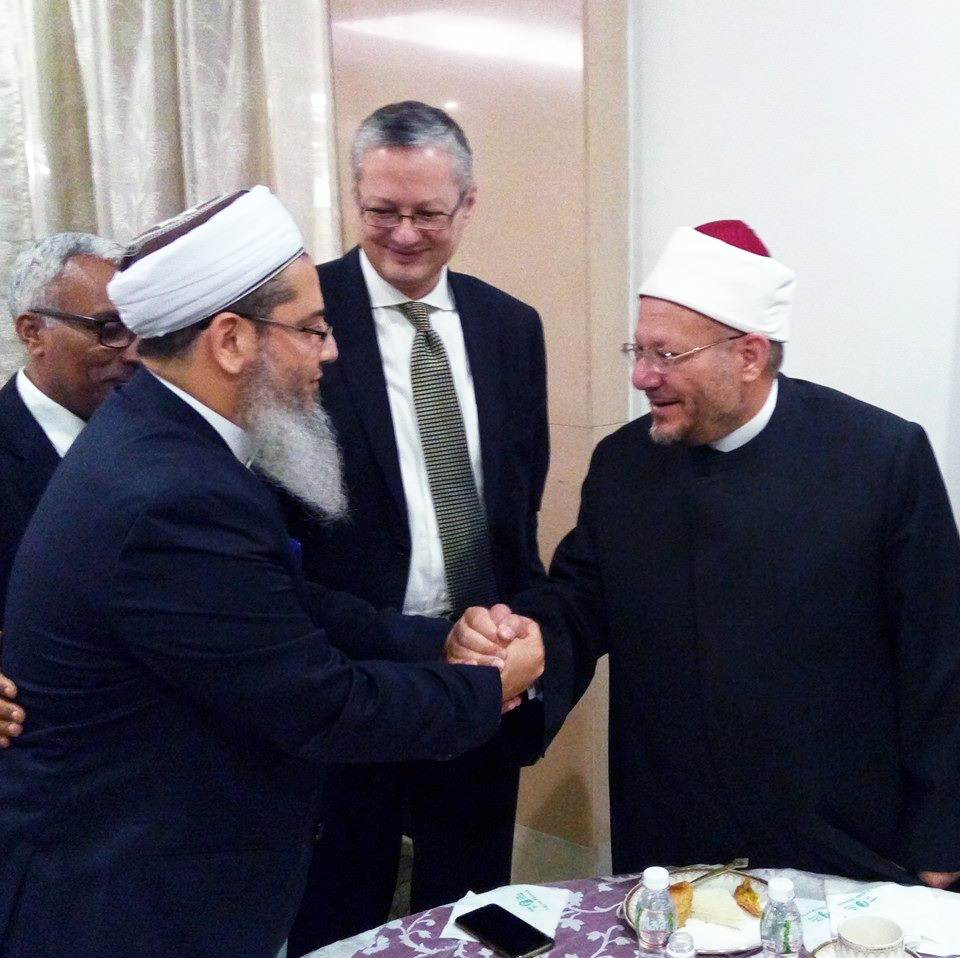
Sayed Tanveer Hashmi with Shawki Allam, Grand Mufti of Egypt, at the World Sufi Forum in New Delhi.

Hashmi has attended Sufi and Sunni Muslim conferences in India and abroad, including sessions of the All India Ulama & Mashaikh Board. In 2006 he organised a protest in Karnataka against the cartoons depicting Muhammad.

Hashmi has also taken public positions on national political issues affecting Muslims, joining other Muslim organisations in statements on the revocation of the special status of Jammu and Kashmir. During the COVID-19 pandemic, he publicly appealed to Muslims to take the COVID-19 vaccine and helped counter claims that it was religiously impermissible.

== See also ==
- List of Sufis
- List of Maturidis
- Jamaat-e-Ahle Sunnat Karnataka
- All India Ulema and Mashaikh Board
- Hashim Peer Dastagir
