= Jamaat-e-Ahle Sunnat Karnataka =

Sunni Barelvi Organisation

- Abbreviation: JASK
- Formation: 2 November 2018
- Founder: Sayed Tanveer Hashmi
- Legal status: Active
- Purpose: Unity Of Muslims
- Region served: India
- President: Sayed Tanveer Hashmi

Jamaat E Ahle Sunnat Karnataka is a Muslim organization Officially registered with Government of Karnataka in Bangalore on 2 November 2018. Jamaat-e-Ahle Sunnat Karnataka was founded by Sayed Tanveer hashmi. It is becoming the voice of Sunni Muslims of Karnataka state, India.

== History ==
Jamaat-e-Ahle Sunnat Karnataka is a Sunni Muslim organization. The adherents of Sunni Islam are referred to in Arabic as 'Ahl As-Sunnah Wa l-Jamāʻah' ("the people of the sunnah and the community") or 'Ahl-as-Sunnah' for short.

Among Sunnis; Hanafi, Maliki, Shafe’ee and Hanbali are considered as Ahle Sunnat Wal Jama’at. The basic difference among the four groups of Ahle Sunnat Wal Jama’at is the fiqh (Jurisprudence of Islam). Otherwise, these four groups have unanimity in beliefs, traditions and the status of Muhammad, his Sahabah (companions), his Aal (progeny) and the Aulia Allah (The very righteous people among Muslims) in Islam. Most of the Ahle Sunnah Wal Jama’ah follow the tradition of Sufism (mysticism of Islam).

Jamat E Ahle Sunnat, Karnataka was formed under the leadership of Scholars and intellectuals in Bijapur to help 10 millions Muslim of Karnataka in various aspects of life, which includes the upliftment of Muslims' in Socio-educational and political fields.

== Religious activities ==
Shaheed Azam Conference is the regular event which Jamat e Ahle Sunnat, Bijapur branch organises.

== Stand on the revocation of Article 370 from Jammu and Kashmir ==
It raised questions over the manner in which the special status of Jammu and Kashmir was abrogated. The body said in a joint statement that neither peace can be established nor loyalty can be bought by disregarding basic principles of the Constitution which are principles of equality, justice and human rights.

== Stand on Triple Talaq ==
The JAS is the petitioner in the Supreme Court against Triple Divorce Act passed by the Indian parliament.

== Executive committee ==
- President - Sayed Tanveer Hashmi
- Vice President -Moulana Sayed Shamshuddin Misbahi
- Secretary -Mufti Mohammed Ali Kazi
- General Secretary -Moulana Niyaz Alam Shaikh

== Aims ==
The aims of Jamaat-e-Ahle Sunnat are as follows.

- To connect all Masjid & Madrasa in the state of Karnataka, and make the Masjid as a center for helping the community in various needs.
- To create effective interaction, coordination, harmony, and mutual understanding; between Sunni Ulma, Mashaaikh, intellectuals and Muslim political leaders in the state of Karnataka.
- To Help community in case of any Natural climates, to rescue and relief work in the event of natural disaster & calamities and to assist and help those affected during communal or political violence without any discrimination.
- To organize educational, cultural and spiritual seminars to educate and train the Muslim Youths.
- To create a Legal Cell, which will provide legal assistance to victims of communal riots, irrespective of caste and creed.
- To approach State & Central Government for grants & facilities exclusively for Muslims, to ensure financial assistance in education & health.
- To create an information center, with multi-languages (Urdu, Kannada, English) which guide the Muslims on various current affairs like NCR, NPA
- To promote peace and communal harmony.
- To create an Educational syllabus for Islamic education, along with the State level education.
- To fight for the overall safety of Aimma o Moazzineen (The leaders of prayer at mosque & those who call for prayer at the appointed times)

== Local branches ==
Although the central secretariat of Jamaat-e-Ahle Sunnat Karnataka is situated in Bangalore, the local branches have also been established in various districts of Karnataka. JAS has established branches in Belgaum, Devanagari, Bijapur and Bagalkot districts.
