= Sally Mursi =

Egyptian actress

Sally Mursi (Arabic: سالي مرسي, born March 30, 1968) is an Egyptian actress and transgender woman. Her sex reassignment surgery in 1988 was a source of controversy and lawsuits in Egypt.

== Transition ==
Prior to pursuing medical operations, Mursi consulted with psychologist Salwa Jirjis Labib and underwent three years of conversion therapy, after which Labib referred her to a surgeon. Mursi was further referred to plastic surgeon Ezzat Ashamallah, who affirmed the diagnosis of "psychological hermaphroditism" and prescribed hormone replacement therapy for one year prior performing surgery on January 29, 1988.

At the same period, Muhammad Sayyid Tantawy also released a Fatwa, recognizing that Sally Mursi needed the surgery for her health and that it was spiritually legal to change sex for transgender people, if their doctors said they needed it. But said that before Mursi could get the surgery, she had to follow all the rules of Islam for women during a year, except the one about marriage.

== Legal battle ==
Mursi studied medicine at Al-Azhar University when she was suspended, pre-transition, for wearing women's clothing. When she returned post-transition, she was expelled and the university initiated a legal battle against her physician, Ashamallah, causing him to be removed from the Physician’s Syndicate. The Syndicate requested a fatwa on the case from Sheikh Muhammad Sayyid Tantawy, who designated the issue as a medical condition and subject to physician's discretion. Al-Azhar brought the case against Ashamallah to court, in which process Sally was subjected to a full body examination. The examiner confirmed the diagnosis and Ashamallah was acquitted.

== See also ==
- Maryam Khatoon Molkara, who was the subject of a similar case and fatwa in Iran
