= Ali Gomaa =

Egyptian imam (born 1952)

Dr. Sheikh Ali Gomaa
- علي جمعة
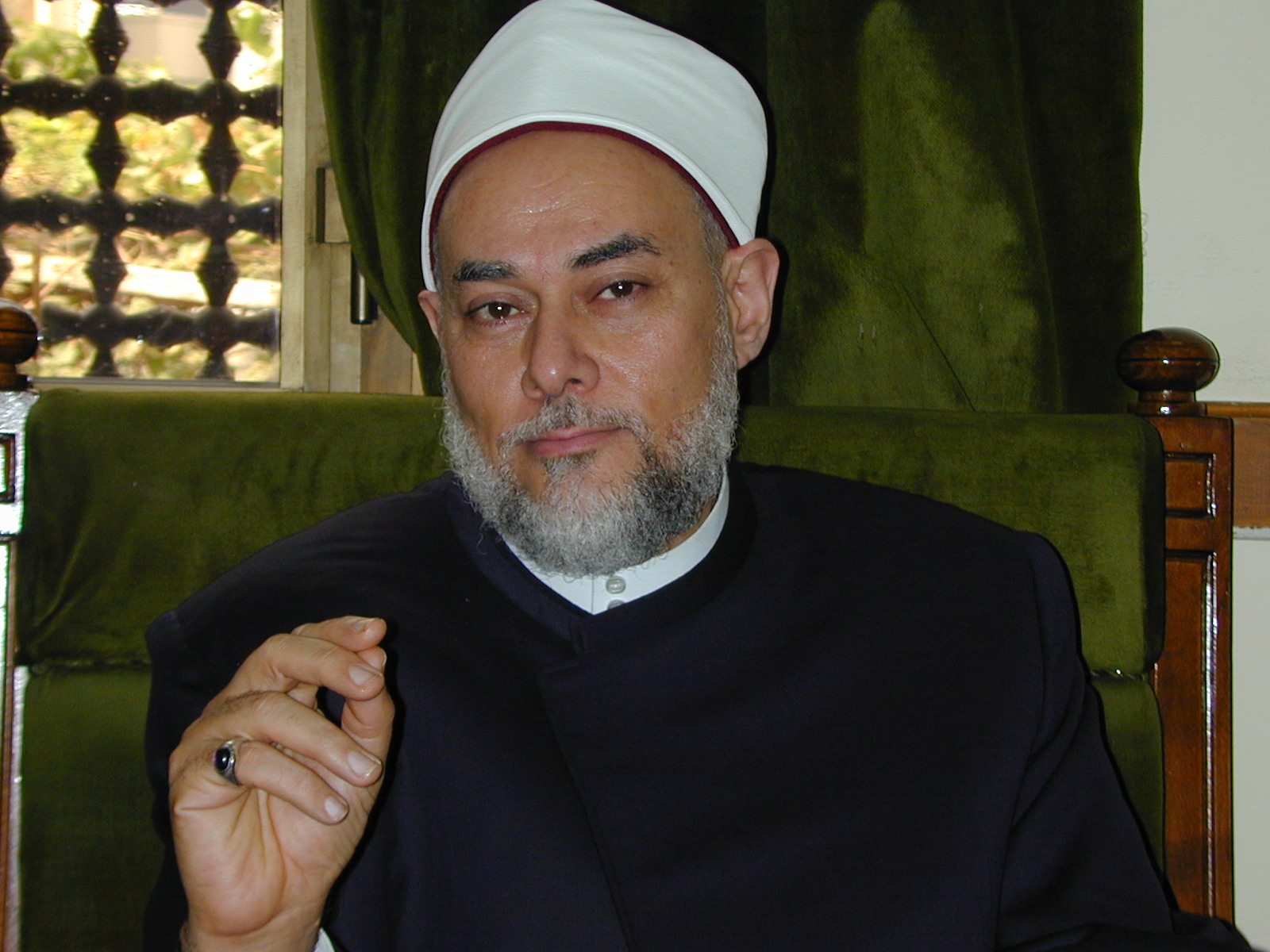
- Gomaa in 2004

Grand Mufti of Egypt
- In office 28 September 2003 – 11 February 2013
- President: Hosni Mubarak; Mohamed Hussein Tantawi (Acting (law)); Mohamed Morsi
- Preceded by: Ahmed el-Tayeb
- Succeeded by: Shawki Ibrahim Abdel-Karim Allam

Personal details
- Born: 3 March 1952 (age 74) Beni Suef, Egypt
- Education: Al-Azhar University (B.A.) (M.A.) (P.H.D.); Ain Shams University (B.Com.); University of Liverpool (H.D.)
- Occupation: Islamic scholar
- Website: draligomaa.com

Religious life
- Denomination: Sunni
- Jurisprudence: Shafi'i
- Creed: Ash'ari
- Movement: Neo-Traditionalism; Modernism

Ali Gomaa (Arabic: علي جمعة, Egyptian Arabic: [ˈʕæli ˈɡomʕæ]; born 3 March 1952) is an Egyptian Islamic scholar, jurist, and public figure who has taken a number of controversial political stances. He specializes in Islamic Legal Theory. He follows the Shafi`i school of Islamic jurisprudence and the Ash'ari school of tenets of faith. Gomaa is a Sufi.

He served as the eighteenth Grand Mufti of Egypt (2003–2013) through Dar al-Ifta al-Misriyyah succeeding Ahmed el-Tayeb. He has, in the past, been considered a respected Islamic jurist, according to a 2008 U.S. News & World Report report and The National, and "a highly promoted champion of moderate Islam," according to The New Yorker. However, in recent years Western academic observers have described him as a supporter of authoritarian forms of government.

He was succeeded as Grand Mufti by Shawki Ibrahim Abdel-Karim Allam in February 2013.

== Career ==
Ali Gomaa was born in the Upper Egyptian province of Beni Suef on 3 March 1952 (7 Jumadah al-Akhirah 1371 AH). Gomaa is married and has three adult children. In person, Gomaa's appearance has been described as "tall and regal, with a round face and a trim beard."

=== Education ===
Gomaa graduated from high school in 1969, at which point he enrolled at Ain Shams University in Egypt's capital, Cairo. Having already begun to memorize the Quran, he delved deeper into his studies of Islam, studying Hadith and Shafi'i jurisprudence in his free time while at university. After completing a B.Comm. (Bachelor of Commerce) at Ain Shams in 1973, Gomaa enrolled in Cairo's al-Azhar University, the oldest active Islamic institution of higher learning in the world. He received a second bachelor's degree (B.A.) from al-Azhar, then an M.A., and finally a PhD with highest honors in Juristic Methodology (usul al-fiqh) in 1988. Since he had not gone through the al-Azhar High School curriculum, he took it upon himself in his first year at the college to study and memorize all of the basic texts, which many of the other students had already covered.

Gomaa's father was a lawyer, who he states was a very great inspiration to him. He stated in an interview to Al-Ahram Weekly: "I was very influenced by my father...I used to watch him stand up for what is right, unafraid of the powers that be. He used to address police officers and judges quite confidently. Those were different times."

=== Teaching ===
Gomaa taught in the faculty of Islamic and Arabic Studies at al-Azhar University from the time he received his M.A. until he was appointed Grand Mufti, first as an assistant professor and then as a full professor. In addition to being a teacher of Aqida, Tafsir, Hadith, legal theory and Islamic history, Gomaa is also a highly respected Sufi master.

In addition to the courses he taught at the University, Gomaa also revived the tradition of open classes held in a mosque where he taught a circle of students six days a week from after sunrise until noon. Gomaa established these lessons in 1998 with the aim of protecting the Islamic intellectual tradition from being lost or misinterpreted: "I want people to continue in the tradition of knowledge reading the classical texts the way they were written, not the way people want to understand them."

In addition to the lessons in al-Azhar, Gomaa also began giving the Friday sermon (khutbah) in Cairo's Sultan Hassan Mosque in 1998 after which he would give a short lesson in Islamic jurisprudence for the general public followed by a question-and-answer session. In addition Gomaa speaks fluent English, and he was a former chairman of Al-Azhar University's Islamic Jurisprudence Department.

An article in The Atlantic states: When he became the khatib, or orator, of Masgid Sultan Hassan, a mosque long favored by devout Cairenes, Gomaa began to attract a following of another kind. His rational, contemporary religious views, coupled with his background in commerce, made him appealing to a segment of Egyptian society that was fast becoming a thorn in the side of both the post-Nasserite government and the rising Islamic extremists: the religious middle class. Entrepreneurs, schoolteachers, bankers, engineers, Gomaa's new followers were socially conservative but financially and politically progressive. They favored extended privatization and transparent governance. Most had been educated in secular institutions, but—owing to the Islamic revival that swept the Middle East in the 1980s and 1990s—many also had a working knowledge of the texts that play a central role in Islamic law: the Koran, the Sunna, and the Hadith. These people saw the growing Wahhabi movement as irrational and an impediment to material progress. "What Dr. Gomaa was attempting was unique and very important," says Hamdi Sabri, one of the mufti's early followers. When he first met Gomaa, in the late 1980s, Sabri was a struggling young businessman, eager to take advantage of his government's move away from socialism. Frustrated by the anti-progressive stance of the fundamentalist movement, Sabri turned to Gomaa for religious guidance. "He was struggling to present Islam in its unaltered form: simply, as the love of God."

The article goes on to say that "Gomaa was free of the Westernization that characterized the liberal sheikhs who were often targets of extremist vitriol. One such sheikh, the leader of a popular Sufi sect, was denounced as decadent and corrupt when he failed to reprimand his followers for drinking liquor and wearing revealing clothes. Gomaa's ideas were countercultural, but his lifestyle was orthodox: he refrained from physical contact with women outside his family, encouraged abstinence before marriage for both sexes, and could often be seen walking with his prayer beads in hand, counting them methodically. Wahhabi extremists had no choice but to keep quiet; any public criticism of Gomaa would have jeopardized their credibility on the Egyptian street."

=== Work with Jihadi Prisoners ===
Gomaa has told American journalist Lawrence Wright that he worked with Islamic Group prisoners who later embraced the "Nonviolence Initiative" and denounced violence. "I began going into the prisons in the 1990s.... We had debates and dialogues with the prisoners, which continued for more than three years. Such debates became the nucleus for the revisionist thinking."

=== Grand Mufti ===
Ali Gomaa was appointed Grand Mufti in late September 2003. by Egyptian President Hosni Mubarak, replacing former Mufti Mohamed Ahmed El-Tayeb. El-Tayeb was appointed Al-Azhar University president, taking over from Ahmed Omar Hashem.

His office, the Dar al Ifta (literally, the House of Fatwas), a government agency charged with issuing religious legal opinions on any question to Muslims who ask for them, issued some 5,000 fatwas a week, including both official ones, which he would personally work on, about important issues and more routine ones handled via phone and Internet by a dozen or so subordinate muftis.

==== Conclusion of term ====
Despite having a one-year extension of his term because of the political situation in post-revolutionary Egypt, Gomaa's term was allowed to expire. A committee decided Shawki Ibrahim Abdel-Karim Allam to be the Mufti's successor.

== Views ==
=== On selling pork and alcohol in the West and 'non-Muslim countries' ===
In a fatwa issued by Dar-al-ifta, approved and signed by Ali Gomaa, the Egyptian Mufti stated that selling pork and alcohol is permitted in the West because "it is allowed taking the opinion of the scholars from the Hanafi madhhab, who allow to deal with wrong contracts in non-Muslim countries."

Another justification was that the Prophet let his uncle Al-‘Abbas ibn ‘Abd al-Muttalib take usury in Mecca when it was a non-Muslim city, and he did not prohibit him except in the year of the Farewell Pilgrimage.

During the fatwa, which was a reply to a question from a Muslim in Europe asking about whether it would be allowed for him to work in stores that sell alcohol and pork along with other products because he cannot find another job, Gomaa mentioned the terms "Dar-al-Harb" (House of War) and "Ahl al-Harb" (people of war) several times, and he gave a response that not only dealt with what the questioner had asked but also considered further points such as the taking of interest and gambling.

=== On female circumcision ===
Since taking office, Gomaa issued a number of fatwas and statements that have made an impact in the media. He has issued a fatwa asserting that men and women enjoy equal political rights in Islam, including the right to become president of a modern state.

He recently stated on national television that it is permissible in Islam for a woman to have hymen restoration surgery for any reason since Islam promotes protecting one's privacy and reputation and does not require a woman to provide proof of her virginity.

In November 2006, he ruled that female circumcision (also referred to as female genital mutilation or FGM) should not be applied; this ruling is in accordance with Egyptian law, which also forbids female circumcision. This ruling came about after a conference instigated by research and a documentary on FGM in Somalia by the German action group Target. The fatwa is now also used in Western Europe to combat FGM.

On 24 June 2007, after an 11-year-old died under the knife undergoing circumcision, he decreed that female circumcision was not just "un-Islamic" but forbidden.

=== Views on women ===
Gomaa has asserted that women are the spiritual equals of men, which he says is repeated in the Quran and words of the Prophet Muhammad. He mentioned that "Al Jeeli, one of the great thinkers of Islam, learned the Hadith [sayings of the prophet Muhammad] from fifty female sheikhs...Fifty female sheikhs! And yet there are those who deny that women have equal spiritual status in Islam. This is a disgrace."

Gomaa has also asserted that women have the right to divorce their husbands. He stated in an article in "The Atlantic" that dubbed Gomaa "The Show-Me Sheikh", "Show me where it says in the Koran or the Sunna (prophetic tradition) that a woman is obligated to cook, or that she can't ask for a divorce. Those listening are often left speechless, because no such support exists within canonical Islamic texts."

Gomaa has stated that the hijab is obligatory, but that woman who do not wear it are committing a minor sin as opposed to a major sin. He asserted that this is something known amongst the scholars, and that the only people who consider it a major sin are those not rooted in knowledge. He stated that missing the prayer is a major sin, and that the sin of not wearing hijab pales in relation to the obligation of prayer.

In responding to a modernist who said that covering hair is not mandatory for women, Gomaa responded that the modernist had misunderstood the words of 19th century Egyptian scholar, Qasim Amin. He stated to him that he has not read a word of Amin, and that Amin was referring to niqab—the veil that covers the face—and not the hijab that covers the hair. Gomaa has stated that it is known that is not permissible for a woman to cover her face, and that Salafists use this as a pretext to control and declare faithless other Muslims.

As Grand Mufti of Egypt, Gomaa issued a fatwa that women can be judges, even as secular judges rejected this notion.

According to Dr James Dorsey of Nanyang Technological University, "Gomaa asserted in 2015 that women did not have the strength to become heart surgeons, serve in the military, or engage in sports likes soccer, body building, wrestling and weightlifting. A year later, Gomaa issued a fatwa declaring writer Sherif El-Shobashy an infidel for urging others to respect a woman’s choice on whether or not to wear the veil." His reasoning was that the obligation of the hijab is known in the religion from necessity, and that anyone who denies something known in the religion by necessity is a disbeliever.

=== Other views ===
Before the Arab revolutions, Gomaa stated that Islam does not call for and has never known a theocratic state and that there is no contradiction between Islam and liberal democracy: "I consider myself a liberal and a Muslim, but this does not mean I am a secularist. The Egyptian [historical] experience has combined liberalism and Islam in the best of ways." After the Arab revolutions, he has been a staunch advocate for authoritarianism.

He is a signatory of the Amman Message, which gives a broad foundation for defining Muslim orthodoxy, unequivocally states that nobody has the right to excommunicate a Muslim, and it restricts the issuing of fatwas to those with the scholarly qualifications to do so.

In 2007, he "unequivocally told The Washington Post that the death penalty for apostasy simply no longer applies."

Ramadan al-Sherbini of Gulf News later reported Gomaa clarifying that Muslims are not free to change their faith: "What I actually said is that Islam prohibits a Muslim from changing his religion and that apostasy is a crime, which must be punished."

However, the Mufti still rejects the death penalty for apostasy. In 2009, posted on his website that he does not believe that apostasy is punishable by death. In fact, it was only two years ago that Sheikh Ali Gomaa made clear statements to the effect that apostasy is not punishable by death in Islam, a position that he holds to this day.

Gomaa has publicly asserted that the anti-Semitic The Protocols of the Elders of Zion is a forgery and made an official court complaint concerning a publisher who falsely put his name on an introduction to its Arabic translation.

=== Views on extremism ===
Gomaa has taken a very clear stance against extremist interpretations of Islam. "He has become the most explicitly anti-extremist cleric in mainstream Sunni Islam."

He says that the use of violence to spread Islam is prohibited and extremists have not been educated in genuine centers of Islamic learning: "Terrorists are criminals, not Muslim activists."

He indicates, about religion in general including Islam: "Terrorism cannot be born of religion. Terrorism is the product of corrupt minds, hardened hearts, and arrogant egos, and corruption, destruction, and arrogance are unknown to the heart attached to the divine."

Gomaa believes the best antidote to Islamic extremism is "traditional conception of sharia law — along with knowledge of Islamic jurisprudence"

=== Views on ISIL ===
Gomaa is highly critical of the rebel group ISIL. In September 2014, he, alongside 226 other prominent Sunni scholars, was a signatory to an open letter denouncing ISIL and its religious tenets.

In February 2015, he was noted for statements regarding the burning to death of Jordanian pilot Muath al-Kasasbeh by ISIL in which he claimed to have proof that the burning was photoshopped and that the pilot was not in fact burned to death. He stated as proof of his claim that in the video published by ISIS, Al-Kasabeh stands still while being burned, something that would seem impossible.

=== On sculptures ===
On 18 April 2006, an article entitled "Egypt's grand mufti issues fatwa: no sculpture" appeared stating: "Artists and intellectuals here say the edict, whose ban on producing and displaying sculptures overturns a century-old fatwa, runs counter to Islam. They also worry that extremists may use the ruling as a pretense for destroying Egypt's ancient relics, which form a pillar of the country's multibillion-dollar tourist industry." Jay Tolson defended Gomaa, saying that "while Gomaa did say that it was un-Islamic for Muslims to own statues or to display them in their homes, he made it very clear that the destruction of antiquities and other statues in the public sphere was unacceptable and indeed criminal. He is also on record deploring the Taliban's destruction of the great Buddhist statuary in Afghanistan."

== Egyptian Revolution ==
Dr. Ali Gomaa made several public statements in relation to the massive uprising that began on 25 January 2011 and led to the stepping down of former Egyptian President Mubarak on 11 February 2011. His general position was one of caution addressing the potential for mass bloodshed and chaos. He was clear that public protest to address grievances is a fundamental human right, but cautioned that mass demonstrations leading to a disruption of day-to-day life could be considered impermissible (haram) from an Islamic legal point of view.

On 3 February 2011, Gomaa went on national TV to answer "hundreds of calls he received that day" with concerns about attending Friday prayer services. He issued a fatwa allowing people who feared physical harm from further mass protests to pray at home and not attend Friday prayer services.

=== Under Morsi ===
In March 2011, Gomaa's 60th birthday and the official retirement age of Egyptian government employees, the SCAF issued him a one-year extension to help with the continuity of government. In June of the following year Muhammad Morsi was elected Egypt's new president. On 20 July 2012, Gomaa held a national press conference to announce the start of the holy month of Ramadan and announced the month in the name of Egypt's new president. In March 2013, Gomaa retired from his position of Grand Mufti of Egypt, and Dr. Shawqi Allam became Egypt's new Grand Mufti.

==== Views on future of Islam in Egypt ====
In an op-ed in The New York Times, he supported the passage of the 2011 Constitutional referendum, calling it a "milestone" for Egyptian democracy.

He also stated that since Egypt is a very religious society, "it is inevitable that Islam will have a place in our democratic political order". However, he reassured that Muslims believe that "Islamic law guarantees freedom of conscience and expression (within the bounds of common decency) and equal rights for women."

He also stated that there was no contradiction between Articles 2 and 7 of the constitution, the former saying that Islam was the official religion of the state and that legislation was based on principles of Islamic jurisprudence, the latter guaranteeing full citizenship before the law to members of Egyptian society regardless of religion, race or creed.

He also stated that Islamists would stay within mainstream, and that radicalism would "not only run contrary to the law, but will also guarantee their political marginalization".

An opponent believes that Gomaa is not necessarily committed to democracy. Following the Egyptian coup, he expressed hostility towards Western democracy in a television interview and stated that it was contrary to Islamic law. Specifically, he argued that the Muslim Brothers should be following Islamic law, not Western democracy.

== 2013 Egyptian Coup ==
Following the 2013 Egyptian coup d'état, Gomaa expressed his support for the coup encouraging soldiers to kill those protesting the coup and cancelled a visit to London out of fear of prosecution for this. According to Dr David H. Warren of University of Edinburgh, Ali Gomaa was one of "the most prominent supporters of the coup and its bloody aftermath." Warren notes that Gomaa referred to anti-coup protestors as the "dogs of hell" and seemed to justify the army's mass killing of these protestors. Dr Usaama al-Azami of the University of Oxford also notes that Gomaa told the army shortly before the Rabaa massacre that they "should not hesitate to kill those who oppose them." After the massacre, al-Azami adds, Gomaa justified the army's actions.

=== Urging military to shoot protestors ===
Professor Mohammad Fadel of the University of Toronto Faculty of Law argues that Gomaa is representative of "authoritarian forms of political Islam." According to Fadel, Gomaa "incited the Egyptian military, in a sermon given to the armed forces in the presence of its senior leadership, to kill supporters of the deposed president, urging them to "shoot to kill" (iḍrab fī’l-malyān)." Fadel adds: "ʿAlī Gomaa exhorts the armed forces to cleanse Egypt of the former president’s supporters, even claiming that the army’s position was vindicated by, among other things, the "innumerable visions (tawātarat al-ruʾā) of the Prophet of God" that came to Egypt's living saints in which he communicated to them his support for the military against the former president."

In the lead up to the coup, Gomaa made several statements, both public and private, in support of the coup. This included a video message to the security forces in which he tells soldiers who are supporting the coup "When somebody comes who tries to divide you, then kill them, whoever they are." During this period, he described protesters against the coup as the "dogs of hell."

These claims according to many sheikhs and scholars were taken completely out of context. Ali Gomaa himself came out in multiple speeches and tv shows and clarified his position. One of these speeches were given to his students after being asked about his position and he extensively elaborated. The speech where he said these things were 4 days after what happened in Rabaa so it cannot be that it encouraged killing of protestors. Secondly, the video for that speech was around 37 minutes and it was given to soldiers to encourage them in their war against terrorism and the people who carry arms against the military, especially in Sinai. So the claims that Ali Gomaa encouraged the army to kill protestors are not only wrong and completely unfair, they are just lies. A lot of people cherry picked parts of the video to make an argument but the full video is posted on youtube to get the context ". Furthermore, it was given 4 days after Rabaa, which debunks the claims that the speech encouraged killing protestors there.

== Attempted assassination ==
On 5 August 2016, as Gomma walked to Fadel Mosque in Sixth of October district, two masked gunmen on a motorcycle fired at him. They fled the scene with him unharmed while one of his bodyguards was slightly wounded. The Hasm Movement claimed responsibility for the attack.

== Original writings ==
The author of "over 50 books, as well as hundreds of articles", his published works include:

- ‘Alaqah Usul al-Fiqh bil al-Falsafah
- Aliyat al-Ijtihad
- Athr Dhihab al-Mahal flllli al-Hukm
- al-Bayan
- al-Hukm al-Shar’i
- al-Ijma’ ‘ind al-Usūliyyīn
- al-Imām al-Shāfi’i wa Madrasatuhu al-Fiqhiyyah
- al-Imām al-Bukhāri
- al-Islām wa al-Musāwāh baina al-Wāqi' wa al-Ma'mūl
- al-Kalim al-Tayyib vol. 2
- Mabāhith al-Amr ‘ind al-Usūliyyin
- al-Madkhal ila Dirāsah al-Madhāhib al-Fiqhiyyah
- al-Mustalah al-Usūli wa al-Tatbiq ‘ala Ta'rif al-Qiyas
- al-Nadhariyyāt al-Usuliyyah wa Madkhal li Dirāsah ‘Ilm al-Usūl
- Qadiyyah Tajdīd Usūl al-Fiqh
- al-Qiyas ‘ind al-Usūliyyīn
- al-Ru’yah wa Hujjiyyatuha al-Usūliyyah
- Taqyīd al-Mubāh
- al-Ṭarīq ilá al-turāth al-Islāmī : muqaddimāt maʻrifīyyah wa-madākhil manhajīyyah. Giza: Nahḍat Miṣr. 2004. ISBN 9771428918.
- al-Dīn wa-al-ḥayāh : al-fatāwá al-ʻaṣrīyah al-yawmīyah. Giza: Nahḍat Miṣr. 2004. ISBN 9771426966.
- al-Kalim al-ṭayyib : fatāwá ʻaṣrīyah. Vol. 1. Cairo: Dār al-Salām. 2005. ISBN 9773422607.
- al-Naskh ʻinda al-uṣūlīyyīn. Giza: Nahḍat Miṣr lil-Ṭibāʻah wa-al-Nashr wa-al-Tawziʻ. 2005. ISBN 9771430076.
- al-Kāmin fī al-ḥaḍārah al-Islāmīyyah. Cairo: Sharikat al-Wābil al-Ṣayyib lil-Intāj wa-al-Tawzīʻ wa-al-Nashr. 2006. ISBN 9776214002.
- Simāt al-ʻaṣr : ruʼyat muhtamm. Giza: Dār al-Fārūq. 2006. ISBN 9774083040.
- al-Mar'ah fī al-hạdārah al-Islāmiyyah : Bayna nusūs ̣al-sharʻ wa turāth al-fiqh wa-al-wāqiʻ al-maʻīsh. Cairo: Dār al-Salām lil-Tịbāʻah wa-al-Nashr wa-al-Tawzīʻ wa-al-Tarjamah. 2006. ISBN 9773423492.
- al-Ṭarīq ilā Allāh. Cairo: al-Wābil al-Ṣayyib li-al-Intāj wa-al-Tawzīʻ wa-al-Nashr. 2007. ISBN 978-9776214033.
- al-Nabī ṣalla Allāh ʻalayhi wa-sallam. Cairo: al-Wābil al-Ṣayyib lil-Intāj wa-al-Tawzīʻ wa-al-Nashr. 2007. ISBN 978-9776214095.
- Aqīdat ahl al-sunnah wa-al-jamāʻah. Cairo: al-Muqaṭṭam lil-Nashr wa-al-Tawzi. 2011. ISBN 9789774780462.

== Teachers ==
His sheikhs and teachers include in alphabetical order:

1. ‘Abd al-Hafidh al-Tijani
2. ‘Abd al-Hakim ‘Abd al-Latif
3. ‘Abd al-Hamid Mayhub
4. Ahmad Jabir al-Yamani
5. ‘Abd al-Jalil al-Qaranshawi
6. Ahmad Hammadah al-Shafi’i
7. Ahmad Mursi
8. ‘Ali Ahmad Mar’i
9. Hasan Ahmad Mar’i
10. al-Husayni Yusuf al-Shaykh
11. Ibrahim Abu al-Khashab
12. ‘Iwad Allah al-Hijazi
13. ‘Iwad al-Zabidi
14. Ismail Sadiq al-’Adwi
15. Ismail al-Zayn al-Yamani
16. Jad al-Haqq ‘Ali Jad al-Haqq
17. Jad al-Rabb Ramadan
18. Muhammad Abu Nur Zuhayr
19. Muhammad Alawi al-Maliki
20. Muhammad Ismail al-Hamadani
21. Muhammad Mahmud Farghali
22. Muhammad Shams al-Din al-Mantiqi
23. Muhammad Zaki Ibrahim
24. Sha’ban Muhammad Ismail
25. Said ‘Abd Allah al-Lajhi
26. al-Sayiid Salih ‘Iwad
27. Salih al-Ja'fari
28. Yasin al-Fādāni

== See also ==
- 2016 international conference on Sunni Islam in Grozny

Sunni Islam titles
Preceded by Ahmed el-Tayeb	Grand Mufti of Egypt; 2003–2013	Succeeded by Shawki Ibrahim Abdel-Karim Allam
