= Gad al-Haq =

Scientist of (Al-Azhar)

Sheikh Gad Al-Haq Ali Gad Al-Haq
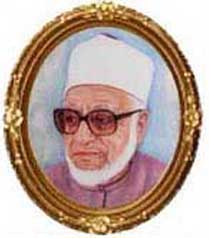
- Born: 5 April 1917; Batra, Dakahlia Governorate, Sultanate of Egypt
- Died: 15 March 1996 (aged 78); Cairo, Egypt
- Known for: Grand Imam of Al-Azhar
- Awards: King Faisal International Prize

Gad al-Haq Ali Gad al-Haq also spelled Jadd al-Haqq (Arabic: جاد الحق علي جاد الحق; 5 April 1917 – 15 March 1996) was Grand Imam of Al-Azhar from 1982 to 1996.

== Life ==
Born in Batra, Dakahlia Governorate and educated at a village school in the Nile Delta, he gained his scholar degree from al-Azhar University, Cairo. Finding a job as a clerk in the Mufti's office, he was promoted to the post of amin al-fatwa. In 1954 he became a judge. Nasser appointed him to the Supreme Council for Islamic Affairs in 1960.

In 1978 Anwar Sadat appointed him as Grand Mufti of Egypt. In 1982 he became Minister of Religious Affairs, and then Grand Imam of Al-Azhar. A conservative voice, he pleased the Egyptian government with his strong opposition to the fundamentalist Wahhabi doctrine. However, the government was less pleased by his criticism of abortion (for which he collaborated with the Vatican delegation) at the 1994 UN Population Conference in Cairo. He refused to accept the Oslo Accords, since they did not acknowledge the Palestinian right of return. He also issued a fatwa against Farag Foda, who was subsequently assassinated. He died in 1996 of a heart attack in Cairo.

== Awards and honors ==
Gad al-Haq was awarded the King Faisal International Prize in 1995.

== Works ==
- Hadha Bayan li'l'Nas
- An Nabī ﷺ fil Qur'an
