= Lists of Muslims =

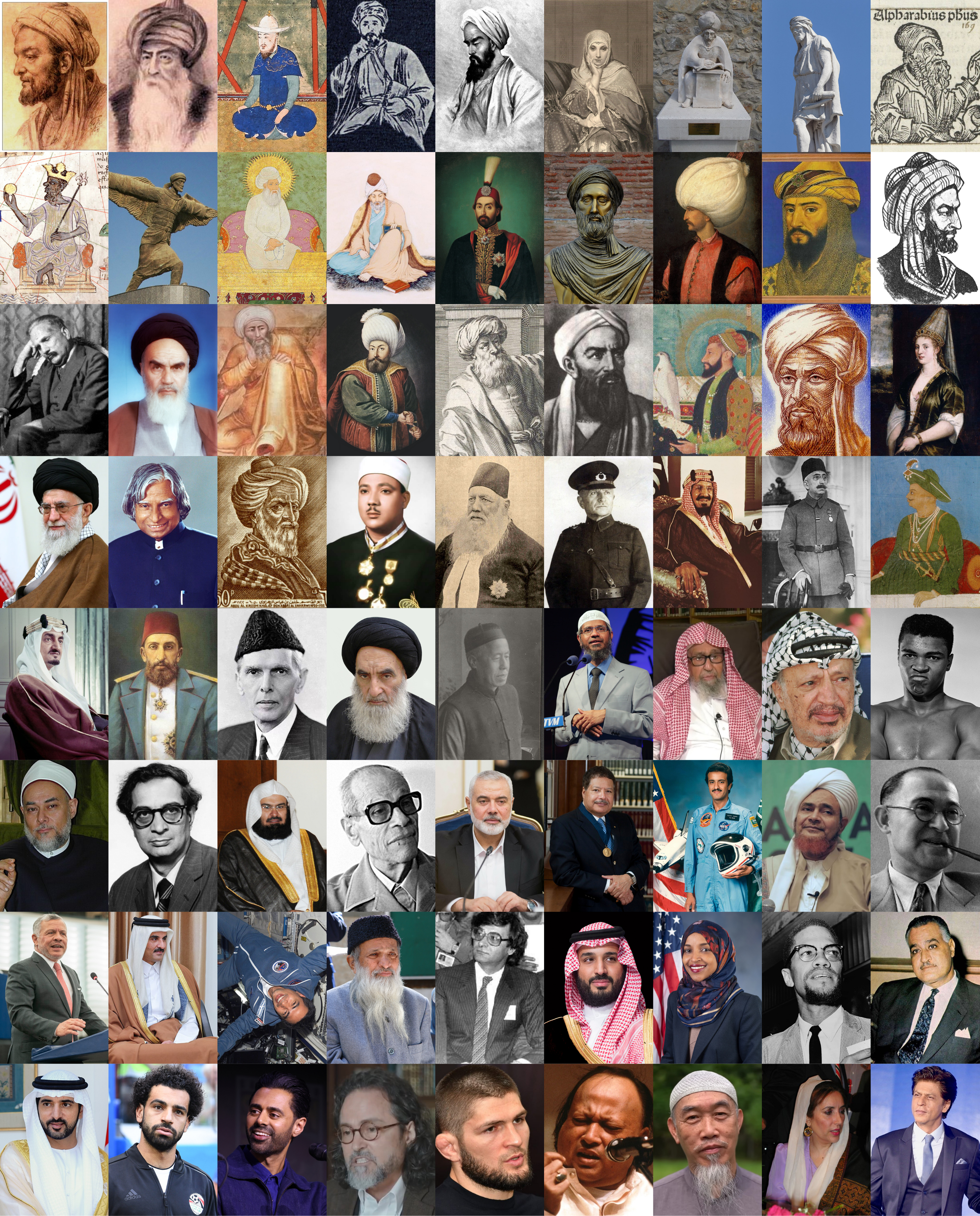
Set of pictures for a number of famous Muslims from various fields

This is a list of lists of Muslims, organized by academics, geography, ethnicity, profession, and religious subgroup.

== Academics and scholars ==
- List of contemporary Islamic scholars
- List of converts to Islam who are Islamic scholars
- List of female Islamic scholars
- List of hadith authors and commentators
- List of Islamic jurists
- List of Islamic scholars described as father or founder of a field
- List of Muslim astronomers
- List of Muslim comparative theologians
- List of Muslim historians
- List of Muslim mathematicians
- List of Muslim philosophers
- List of Muslim theologians
- List of pre-modern Arab scientists and scholars
- List of Quran interpreters
- List of scientists in medieval Islamic world
- List of Shia Muslim scholars of Islam

== Arts and literature ==
- List of Muslim comedians
- List of Muslim painters
- List of Muslim writers and poets
- List of Muslims in entertainment and the media in non-Muslim countries

== Politics and leadership ==
- List of caliphs
- List of Islamic muftiates
- List of Muslim members of the United States Congress
- List of Muslim military leaders
- List of Muslim states and dynasties
- List of Muslim women heads of state and government
- List of the first women heads of state and government in Muslim-majority countries

== By geography, ethnicity, and language ==
- List of American Muslims
  - List of African-American Muslims
- List of Australian Muslims: Islam in Australia § Notable figures
- List of British Muslims
  - List of British Muslim politicians
- List of Burmese Muslims
- List of Canadian Muslims
- List of Chinese Muslims: Islam in China § Famous Muslims in China
- List of French Muslims: Islam in France § French Muslims
- List of German Muslims: Islam in Germany § Notable German Muslim immigrants
- List of Indian Muslims: Islam in India § Prominent Muslims in India
  - List of Hyderabadi Muslims
  - List of Marathi Muslims
  - List of Odia Muslims
  - List of Tamil Muslims
- List of Israeli Arab Muslims
- List of Japanese Muslims: Islam in Japan § Notable Muslims
- List of Muslim saints of Algeria
- List of Nepalese Muslims: Nepalese Muslims § Notable people
- List of Nigerian Islamic religious leaders
- List of Polish Muslims: Islam in Poland § Notable Muslims
- List of Punjabi Muslims
- List of Russian Muslims: Islam in Russia § Notable Russian Muslims
- List of Ukrainian Muslims: Islam in Ukraine § Prominent Muslims of Ukraine
- List of Yemeni Imams: Imams of Yemen § List of imams

== Religious groups / school of thoughts ==
=== Sunni ===
- List of Hanafis
- List of Malikis
- List of Shafi'is
- List of Hanbali scholars
- List of Ash'aris
- List of Atharis
- List of Maturidis
- List of Sunni dynasties
- List of Zahiris
- List of Deobandis

=== Shia ===
- List of Shia Muslims
- List of Shia scholars of Islam
- List of hujjatul Islams
- Lists of maraji
  - List of current maraji
  - List of deceased maraji
- List of extinct Shia sects
- List of Shia hadith scholars
- List of Isma'ili missionaries
- List of Alawites
- List of Shia dynasties

=== Sufi ===
- List of Sufis
- List of Sufi saints
- List of modern Sufi scholars

=== Other ===
- List of Dai of the Dawoodi Bohra
- List of Quranists

== Other lists ==
- List of converts to Islam
- List of former Muslims
- List of Imams of the Two Holy Mosques
- List of Muezzins of the Two Holy Mosques
- List of Muslim Academy Award winners and nominees
- List of Muslim astronauts
- List of Muslim feminists
- List of non-Muslim authors on Islam
- List of Sahabah
  - List of non-Arab Sahabah
- Lists of mosques

== See also ==
- Prophets and messengers in Islam
- Lists of people by belief
- List of inventions in the medieval Islamic world
- Islam by country
- List of Islamic educational institutions
