= Music of Saudi Arabia =

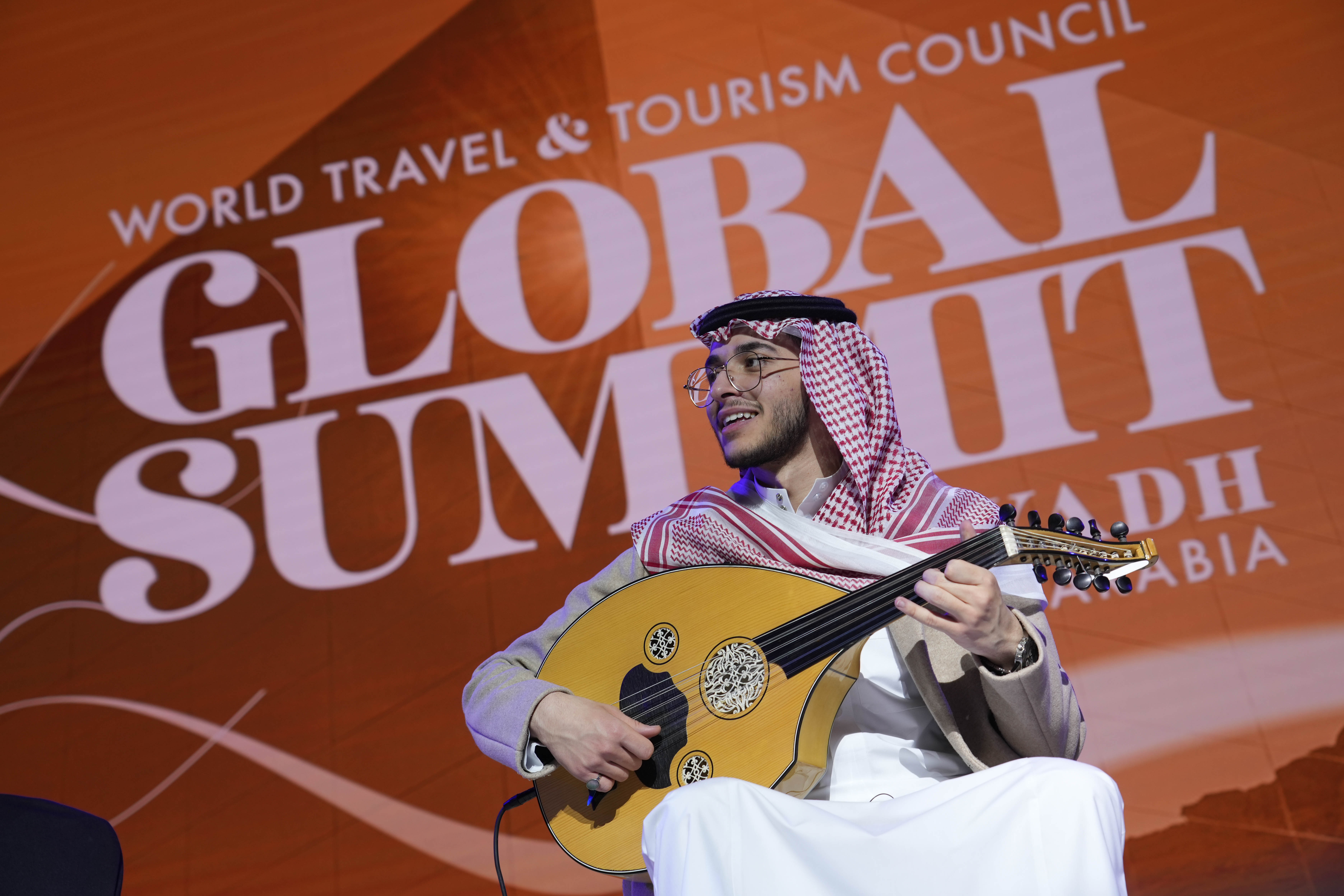
A Saudi male musician performing at the World Travel and Tourism Council's Global Summit Saudi Arabia 2022

The music of Saudi Arabia includes both Western and traditional music.

== Overview ==
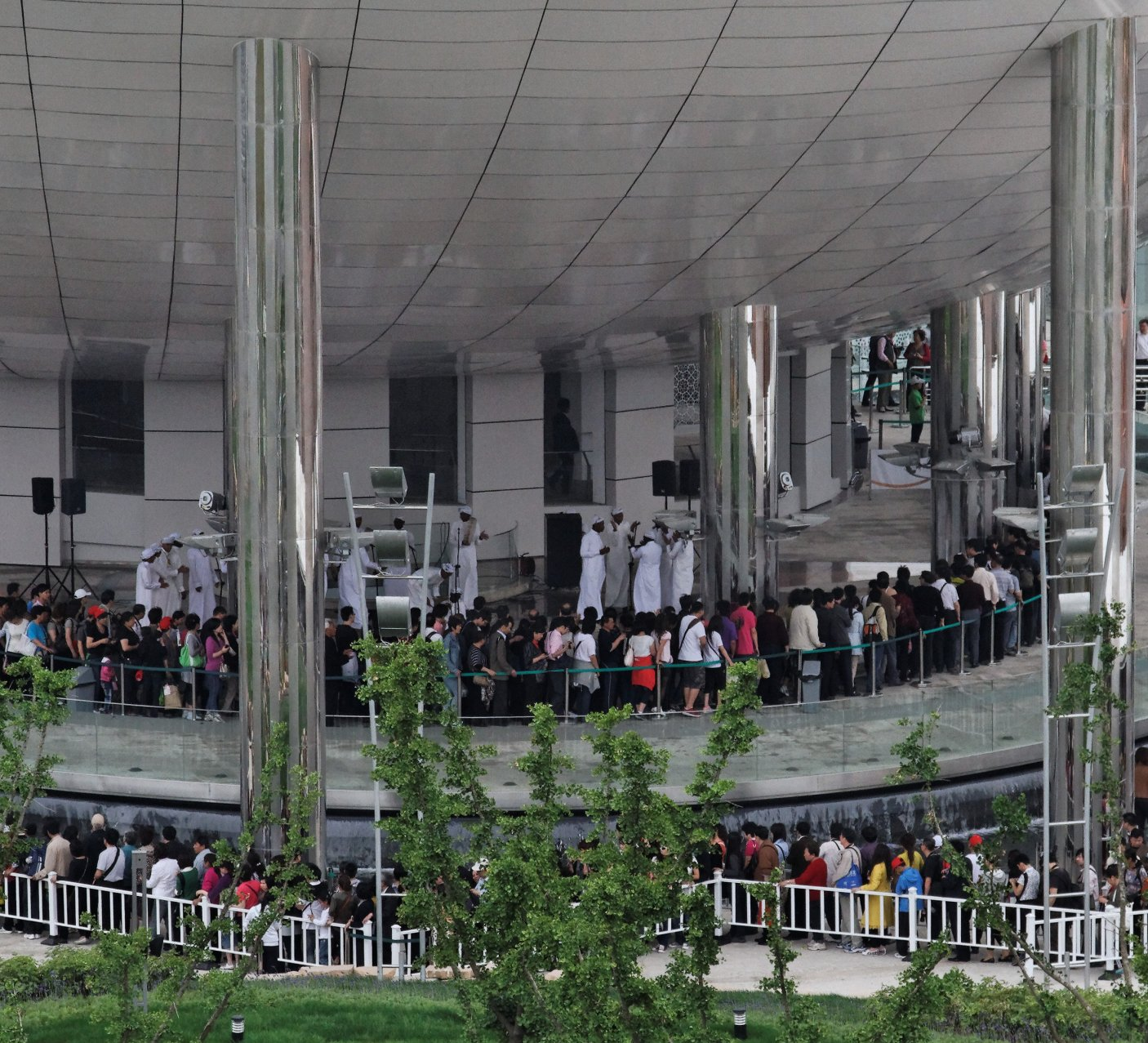
A musical performance at the Saudi Arabia Pavilion during Expo 2010

Saudi traditional music is quite limited. However, the migratory lifestyle of the bedouin militated against carrying excess baggage, including musical instruments. Simple rhythms, with the beat counted by clapping or striking together everyday implements formed the basis of the music. Instruments like the double-reeded ney or the stringed rababa were sometimes used, after being obtained in cosmopolitan cities such as Jeddah.

However, music is considered "sinful" or "haram" by Wahhabi Muslims, including Salah Al Budair who is the Imam of the Grand mosque in Medina. This is based in part on certain Ahadith which speak negatively of non-percussion musical instruments and the idea that music and art are distractions from God. Some Muslims also believe it is sinful for songs to make any mention of women and for women to be involved in the composition of music. Particularly in the early days of the current Saudi state, religious authorities were quick to repress music other than the rhythmic percussion that still dominates contemporary Saudi music.

Ibtisam Lutfi and Etab were among the first two female singers from Saudi Arabia, with 1979 being a pivotal year for the emergence of female musicianship in the kingdom.

Omar Basaad was chosen as the best Saudi DJ and Electronic Dance Music Producer in 2012, by Saudi Gazette. He became the first official Saudi EDM (Electronic Dance Music) producer to represent Saudi Arabia internationally.

Samri is a popular traditional music and dance style in Najd Region.

In 2023, the first Saudi Idol competition was held in Riyadh, with judges Aseel Abu Bakr, Ahlam, Assala, and Maged al Mohandes. 29-year-old Hams Fekri, a singer from Jeddah, won the title.

== Dance ==
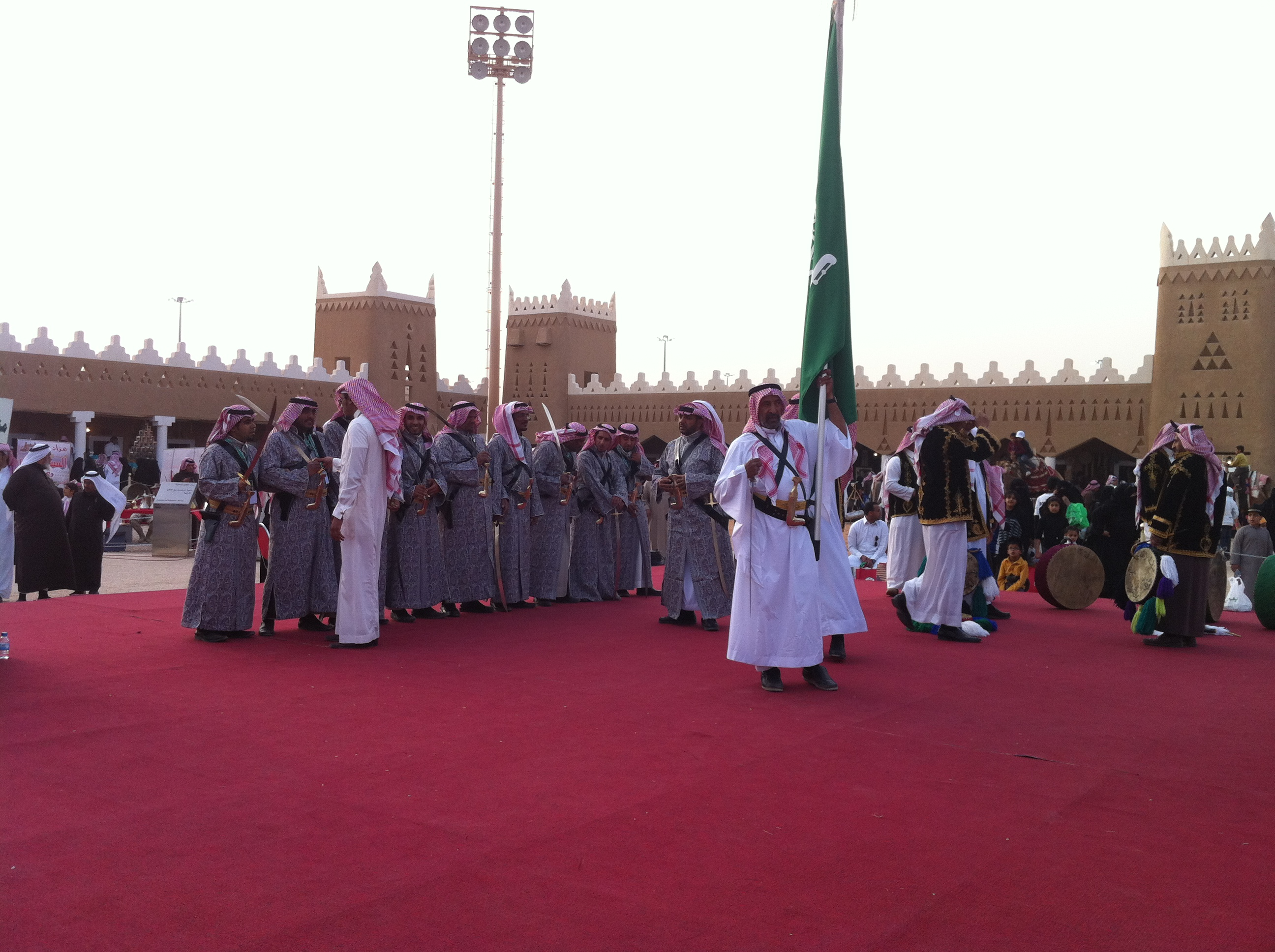
Ardah at Jenadriyah

=== Ardah ===
Ardah, a type of folkloric dance, is the most popular dance in Saudi Arabia, and also the national dance. It is performed with two rows of men opposite of one another, each of whom may or may not be wielding a sword or cane, and is accompanied by drums and spoken poetry.

Najdi ardah is the most common variant of ardah in Saudi Arabia. It is also the most practiced and highly televised male folkloric dance in the entire country. The Saudi government changed its name to 'Saudi ardah' in the 21st century. However, there are numerous variations of ardah distinct from Najdi ardah throughout the country, notably in the regions of Najran, Asir and Jizan.

== Rock/metal music ==
Rock and metal artists from Saudi Arabia include The AccoLade and Al-Namrood.

== Music institutions ==
Pursuant to the order of the Saudi Crown Prince, the first music teaching institute was established in Riyadh in 2019. The Institute was launched by the Egyptian violinist Mahmoud Sorour. Sorour plans to train around 50 violinists to enable them to perform in Jeddah opera house that is planned to be launched in 2022.

== See also ==
- Arabic music
- Arabic pop music
- The Saudi National Orchestra and Choir

== Sources ==
- Urkevich, Lisa (2015). Music and Traditions of the Arabian Peninsula: Saudi Arabia, Kuwait, Bahrain, and Qatar. New York: Routledge
- Badley, Bill (2000). "Sounds of the Arabian Peninsula". In Broughton, Simon and Ellingham, Mark with McConnachie, James and Duane, Orla (Ed.), World Music, Vol. 1: Africa, Europe and the Middle East, pp 351–354. Rough Guides Ltd, Penguin Books. ISBN 1-85828-636-0
