= ACFF =

ACFF may refer to:

- ACF Fiorentina, an Italian football club
- American Conservation Film Festival
- Azerbaijani Culture Friends Foundation, a charity foundation in Azerbaijan
