= Abdulbari ath-Thubaity =

Imam and Khatib at Prophet's Mosque Medina

Fadhilat al-Shaykh Abdulbari ath-Thubaity
- عبدالباري بن عوض الثبيتي
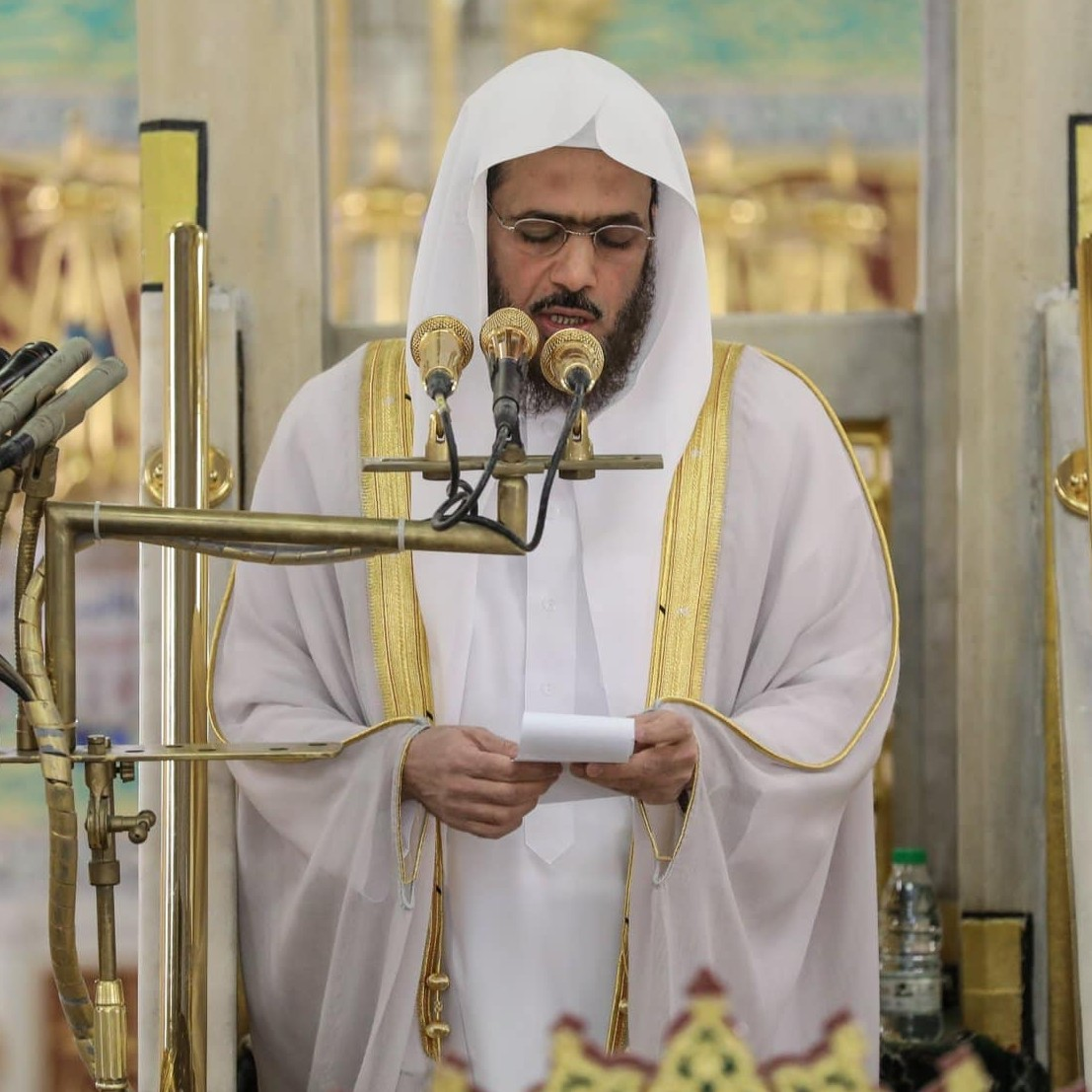

Imam and Khatib at Prophet's Mosque
- Incumbent
- Assumed office 1994

Guest Imam at Masjid al-Haram
- In office 1990–1994

Personal life
- Born: 1960 (age 65–66) Mecca, Saudi Arabia
- Education: Umm al-Qura University, Islamic University of Madinah
- Occupation: Imam; Khatib; Islamic Scholar

Religious life
- Religion: Islam
- Abdulbari ath-Thubaity recitation Recitation of Al-Ala

Abdulbari bin Awad ath-Thubaity (Arabic: عبدالباري بن عوض الثبيتي) is an Imam and Khatib at the Prophet's Mosque, Medina. And former guest imam for taraweeh at Masjid al-Haram.

== Birth ==
Abdulbari bin Awwaad ath-Thubaity was born in the year 1960 (1380 AH) in Mecca, Saudi Arabia.

== Education ==
Sheikh Abdul Bari Al thubaity completed his early education in the schools of Mecca. He also memorized the Quran at an early age.

He earned bachelor's degree in 1984 and Master's degree in Sharia Law in 1995 from King Abdulaziz University. He then achieved Ph.D in Fiqh(Islamic jurisprudence) in 2001, from the Islamic University of Madinah.

== Imam and Khatib at the two holy Mosques ==
=== At Masjid al-Haram ===
Abdulbari ath-Thubaity was appointed as a guest imam for 4 years at Masjid al-Haram, Mecca from 1990 to 1993 for Tarawih Prayers during the month of Ramadan. He also participated in the 1990 and 1992 completion night, with Ali al-Hudhayfi and Abdullah Khulaifi in 1990, and al-Sudais in 1992 completion night. After his tenure ended, for the next few years Tarawih was only led by al-Sudais and Saud al-Shuraim

=== At Prophet's Mosque ===
He was appointed as the Imam and Khatib of the Prophet’s Mosque in Medina in 1994. He regularly led the Tarawih prayers until 2007, when he stepped down due to health reasons (thyroid cancer). Since then, during the month of Ramadan, he is typically scheduled to lead the Fajar and Maghrib prayers throughout the month, unless health conditions prevent him from doing so.
