= Muslim women political leaders =

Women leaders of Muslim countries

Movements for Muslim women to seek roles in national leadership have increased rapidly. Greater opportunities for women in education have further encouraged their involvement in politics. The most prominent and important Muslim female leaders are former prime minister of Pakistan Benazir Bhutto (1988–1990 and 1993–1996), Indonesian president Megawati Sukarnoputri (2001–2004), former Turkish prime minister Tansu Çiller (1993–1996), former Senegalese prime minister Mame Madior Boye (2001–2002), Bangladeshi prime ministers Khaleda Zia (1991–1996 and 2001–2006) and Sheikh Hasina Wajed (1996–2001 and 2009–2024), former Iranian vice president Masoumeh Ebtekar (1997–2005), former Malian prime minister Cissé Mariam Kaïdama Sidibé (2011–2012), Kosovan president Atifete Jahjaga (2011–2016), former president of Mauritius Ameenah Gurib (2015–2018), former president of Singapore Halimah Yacob (2017–2023) and current president of Tanzania Samia Suluhu Hassan (vice president that ascended to presidency after the sudden death of John Pombe Magufuli in March 2021)

Dar al-Ifta al-Misriyyah, an Islamic institute that advises Egypt's ministry of justice, issued a fatwa stating that female rulers and judges are allowed in Islam. The Qur'an contains verses that appear to support the role of women in politics, such as its mention of the Queen of Sheba, who represented a ruler who consulted with and made important decisions on behalf of her people. The Hadith provides numerous examples of women having public leadership roles. Muhammad's first wife, Khadija bint Khuwaylid, was his chief adviser as well as his first and foremost supporter. His third wife, Aisha Bint Abu Bakr, a well-known authority in medicine, history, and rhetoric, often accompanied him to battles, even leading an army at the Battle of the Camel. In the context of this battle a hadith is ascribed to Muhammad where he said, "Never will succeed such a nation as makes a woman their ruler. During the battle of Al-Jamal, Allah benefited me with a Word (I heard from the Prophet). When the Prophet heard the news that the people of the Persia had made the daughter of Khosrau their Queen (ruler), he said, "Never will succeed such a nation as makes a woman their ruler." However, contemporary scholars have cast doubt on the authenticity of this Hadith, citing the odd timing of the Hadith's first release, its contradiction with the verses of the Quran, and the most likely use of the Hadith for a specific person at the time (Queen of Persia) rather than as a general rule or advice.

Though leadership opportunities for Muslim women are cemented in religious text and continue to expand today, earlier generations had different understandings of women's roles.

Despite modern developments and greater inclusion of Muslim women in political life, there are Muslims in certain countries who maintain that the ideal Muslim woman should confine herself to the role of mother and wife.

== Quranic views ==
Islamic scholars argue that the Qur'an gives women the right to participate in public affairs, as there are examples of women who took part in serious discussions and argued even with Muhammad. In addition, during the Caliphate of Omar, a woman argued with him in the mosque, proved her point, and caused him to declare in the presence of many people: "A woman is right and Omar is wrong". However, one of the major problems with the ability for women to lead in Muslim-majority countries stems from differences in interpretation of the textual foundations for Islam, the Qur'an and Hadiths. This problem is exacerbated by the complexity of the Arabic language, the different sectors of Islam, such as the differences between Shia Islam and Sunni Islam, and the differences that occur across the different regions. There is not a singular interpretation of the Qur'an that defines Islam. Therefore, the role of women as leaders cannot be definitively found in the Qur'an. The role of female leaders is constantly evolving depending on interpretation. Through new modern interpretations from the "progressive Islam" movement, women have gained more freedom and power as leaders.

Sections of the Qur'an used to limit women's power:

Men are the caretakers of women, as men have been provisioned by Allah over women and tasked with supporting them financially.

— Surah An-Nisa 4:34

This verse, however, is often misinterpreted.

In Chapter 27, verses 27:29–44, the Qur'an references female leadership with the Queen of Sheba (Bilqis) who had a role similar to head of state.

Sections of the Qur'an used to equate women's power:

And do not crave what Allah has given some of you over others. Men will be rewarded according to their deeds and women ˹equally˺ according to theirs. Rather, ask Allah for His bounties. Surely Allah has ˹perfect˺ knowledge of all things

— Surah An-Nisa 4:32

Surely ˹for˺ Muslim men and women, believing men and women, devout men and women, truthful men and women, patient men and women, humble men and women, charitable men and women, fasting men and women, men and women who guard their chastity, and men and women who remember Allah often—for ˹all of˺ them Allah has prepared forgiveness and a great reward.

— Surah Al-Ahzab 33:35

== History ==
The female role has been constructed throughout history. Historically in Islamic societies, the women's role has been within the home, which has limited and created obstacles for female leaders. During the time of Muhammad and throughout the early and per-Islamic period, women were given a great sense of freedom and power. The wives of Muhammad, referred to as the Mothers of the Believers, were considered the ideal way for women in Islam to behave. Many of his wives and women within the early Islamic period were widely important in different leadership areas. Khadija bint Khuwaylid was not only economically successful prior to her marriage to Muhammad, but she is also considered the first convert to Islam, aiding Muhammad during the revelations and the tumultuous history of the early Islamic period. His wife Hafsa bint Umar was entrusted with safeguarding the Qur'an, and his wife Aisha bint Abi Bakr led an army in the Battle of the Camel. Muhammad also appointed Umm Waraqa as a female imam of both men and women. However, the role of women in all of Islam is difficult to generalize, as there are many different sectors of Islam and different interpretations of Qur'an verses which place the role of women in Islamic societies in different ways.

Overall, women became regulated to positions within the household, becoming protected through seclusion, with men dictating the major decisions of their lives. Therefore, a separate movement for the rights and freedoms of females in Islam began to stir in the early 20th century. Two major figures who called for the liberation and education of women in Islamic societies were Rifa 'a al-Tahtawi and Qasim Amin. Qasim Amin is considered the father of women's reform in the Muslim Middle East, challenging societal norms in his book The Liberation of Women. Amongst these two male leaders were also three Egyptian women, Maryam al-Nahhas, Zaynab Fawwaz, and Aisha al-Taymuriyya, who worked for the Islamic feminism movement in the late 19th century. In 1956, Doria Shafik led a suffrage movement in Egypt. The movement for women as political leaders in modern-day Islamic society was spearheaded by these modern day activists for gender equality. However, the progress of this movement varies in different Arab countries and within different sectors of Islam, as new interpretations shape the gender construction for women in Islamic societies.

== Political leaders ==
There are many twentieth and twenty-first century examples of women leading Muslim-majority countries. The majority of all Muslims in the world live in countries that have, at some time, elected women as their leaders. The three most populous Muslim-majority countries have had women as leaders including Indonesia, Pakistan, and Bangladesh. As of 2007, women still face many pressures as political leaders, including arrests, imprisonments, and assassination attempts.

=== Afghanistan ===
- Kubra Noorzai

First female minister of Afghanistan. The third Afghan Constitution (in 1964 under King Zahir Shah) gave women the right to vote and enter parliament as elected candidates for the first time. As a result, in elections the following year three women were elected as members of the parliament and two were appointed as members of the senate. Kubra Noorzai was appointed Minister of Public Health in 1965 and re-appointed in 1967.

- Shafiqa Ziayee

Shafiqa Ziayee became the second female minister when appointed Minister without Portfolio in 1971.

- Massouda Jalal

After graduating medical school in Kabul in 1988, she practiced as a physician until 1999 when the rule of the Taliban made this impossible. She began working for the women-led UN World Food Programme (WFP) in 1999. After the Taliban was removed from power in 2002 she was one of 200 women who participated in the loya jirga. She ran for president in 2002, becoming the first woman to run for this position in Afghanistan. She won 171 votes (the second most ballots received) in the 2002 presidential election against Karzai. She lost the election to Hamid Karzai but served within his cabinet as the Women's Affairs Minister from 2004 to 2006. Jalal was later nominated to study in Washington, D.C., at the Center for Development and Population Activities (CEDPA), which teaches women how to advance their leadership roles.

- Azra Jafari

One of 200 women who participated in the loya jirga after the fall of the Taliban in 2002. She is the first female mayor in Afghanistan. She was the mayor of Nili a town in Daykundi Province of Afghanistan from 2008 till 2014. She is a member of the Hazara ethnic group, a religious and ethnic minority in Afghanistan. During her term she worked on receiving funds to build infrastructure in Nili. Before taking office she had left to Iran due to the civil war in the early 1990s. There she ran a school for Afghan children. In 2001 she returned to Afghanistan to participate in a peace jirga.

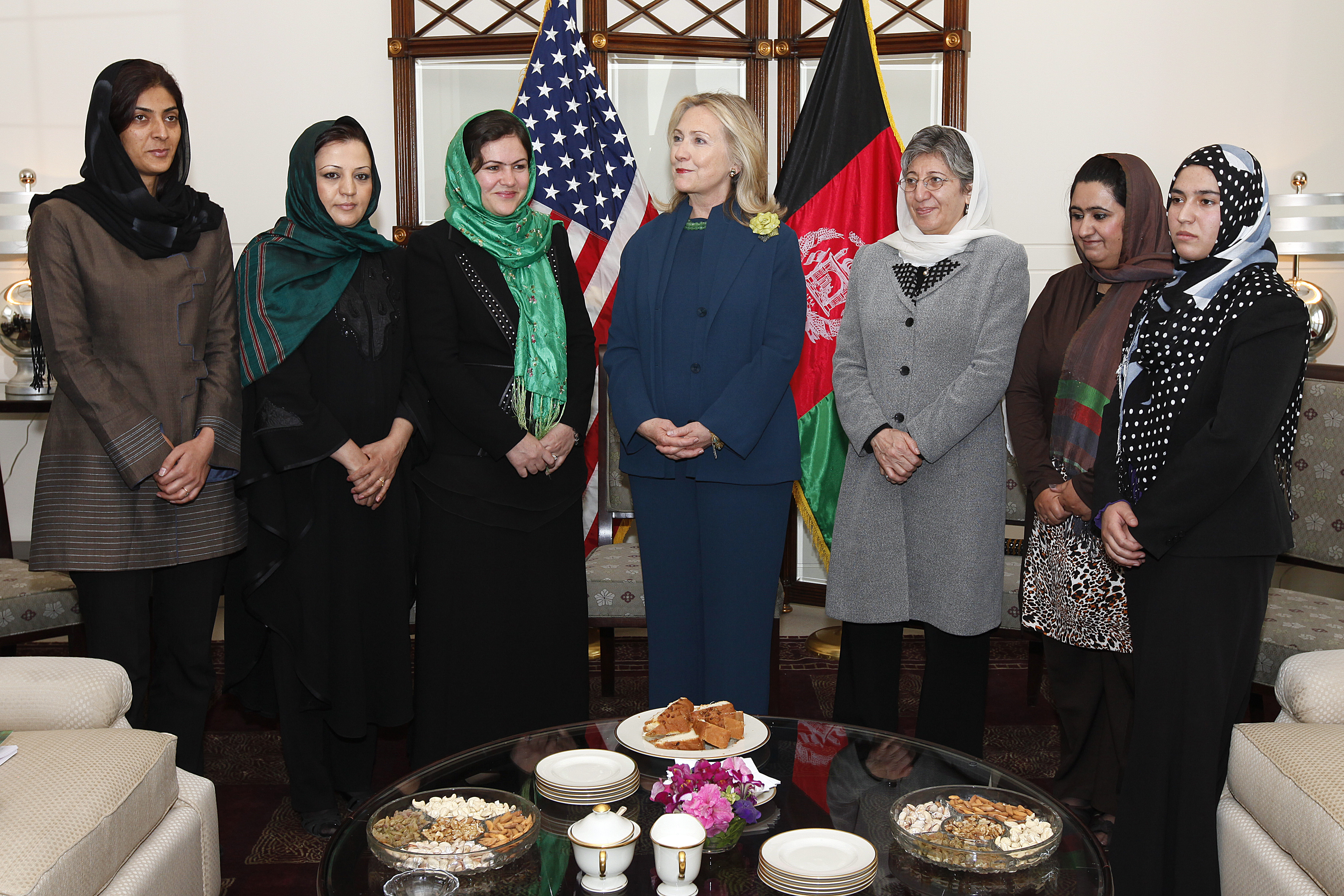
U.S. Secretary of State Hillary Clinton standing with Afghan female politicians, including Fauzia Koofi on her right and Sima Samar to her left.

- Fawzia Koofi

In 2014, she became a candidate for President of Afghanistan after being elected as the vice president of the National Assembly of Afghanistan in 2005. As vice president she became the first female second deputy speaker of Parliament. She was one of the few women selected to take part in a U.S. backed negotiation talk with the Taliban. On her way back from on one of the meetings she survived an assassination attempt. In August 2021 she fled Afghanistan to Qatar on one of the last evacuation flights. She managed to leave despite being under house arrest by the Taliban. Since leaving Afghanistan she went to the United Nations with a delegation of Afghan women. Urging the United Nations to not compromise on inclusion and equal rights in Afghanistan.

- Sima Samar

She served as the Afghanistan Ministry of Women's Affairs from 2001 to 2003. From 2004 to 2019, she chaired the Afghanistan Independent Human Rights Commission that holds human rights violators accountable. Her work on this commission lead to her receiving death threats. She is the founder of the Shuhada Organization which operates schools for boys and girls, in 2012 it managed more than 100 schools. Shuhada also worked on providing healthcare and managed ran fifteen clinics and hospitals. Sima Samar was appointed as a member of the United Nations Secretary-General's High-Level Panel on Internal Displacement in December 2019.

- Frozan Fana

Ran in the Afghan Presidential Election of 2009.

- Shahla Atta

Ran in the Afghan Presidential Election of 2009.

=== Azerbaijan ===
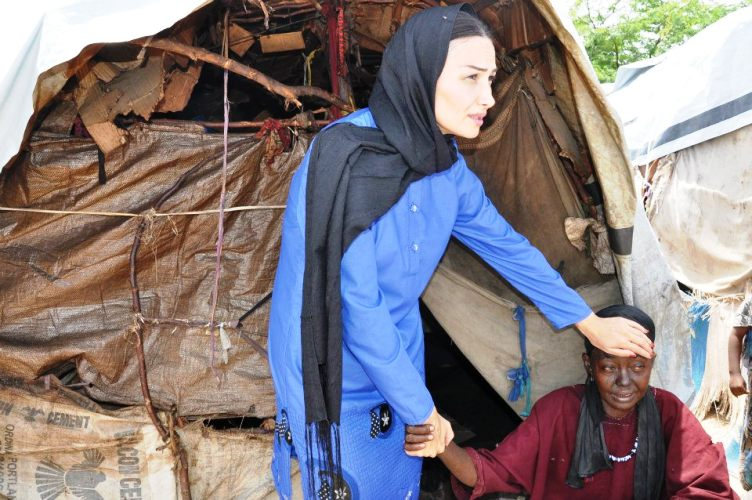
Ganira Pashayeva

Popular Azerbaijani female political leader
- Tahira Tahirova

She was a Soviet politician and diplomat. She served as Foreign Minister of the Azerbaijani Soviet Socialist Republic from 1959 to 1983.

- Elmira Gafarova

She was Speaker of the National Assembly of Azerbaijan and Minister of Foreign Affairs of Azerbaijan.

- Lala Shevket

Lala Shevket is the world's first female Secretary of State. Her specialities are Professor and Doctor of medicine. She became the first female ambassador in Azerbaijan in 1993. She served as the Secretary of State in Azerbaijan from 1993 to 1994. She chose to resign from this position because of her dissatisfaction with corruption within the government. She founded the Azerbaijan Liberal Party in 1995 and has conducted Presidential runs as the head of this party.

On 7 June 2003, in the Liberal Party Congress, Shevket resigned from the party in order to start her presidential campaign as an independent candidate. Thus, she has laid another cornerstone in the political tradition of Azerbaijan. As leader of the National Unity Movement and the Liberal Party of Azerbaijan, Shevket participated in the 2005 Parliamentary Election at the head of the list of 70 Liberal Party candidates. She won a decisive victory in her constituency, which was officially recognised by the Central Election Commission. As the result of total falsification, however, the victory of at least 11 Liberal Party candidates was not officially recognized. On 17 February 2006, the "Azadliq" Political Bloc was created. In 2010, before the parliamentary elections, "Azadliq" Political Bloc has been disbanded due to the decision of the Popular Front Party to join a coalition with the Musavat Party.

- Mehriban Aliyeva

She is the Vice President and First Lady of Azerbaijan, the head of Heydar Aliyev Foundation, the chairperson of Azerbaijani Culture Friends Foundation, the president of Azerbaijani Gymnastics Federation, the goodwill ambassador of UNESCO and ISESCO. In 1995, she established the Azerbaijani Culture Friends Foundation. In 1996, with financial support from Chevron, the foundation gave lifetime awards to six representatives of Azerbaijani art and culture. In Azerbaijan's 2005 parliamentary elections, she was elected to the National Assembly of Azerbaijan. She had previously broken with tradition to help campaign for her husband in 2003, when he ran for President of Azerbaijan. On 24 November 2006, Aliyeva was awarded the title of Goodwill Ambassador of ISESCO for her attention to the children in need and help to improve their living conditions and education.

- Leyla Yunus

She is an Azerbaijani human rights activist who serves as the director of Institute of Peace and Democracy, a human rights organisation. She is particularly known for her work helping citizens affected by forced evictions in Baku, on whose behalf she organized several small protests. Yunus is a historian by training and wrote her dissertation on "English-Russian Rivalry on the Caspian Sea and Azerbaijan in the First Part of the 18th Century". In the last years of the Soviet Union, Yunus was active in pro-reform circles. In 1988, she founded the "Popular Front of Azerbaijan in Support of Perestroika", together with a small group of moderate intellectuals. Early on, this Popular Front of Azerbaijan was deliberately modeled on the example of the Popular Front of Estonia.

- Ganira Pashayeva

She is a Member of the National Assembly of Azerbaijan. Since 1998, she worked as a reporter, correspondent, editor, leading editor, senior leading editor, deputy editor-in-chief, and deputy editor-in-chief of the news service and deputy editor-in-chief of the news section at the ANS Group of Companies Television Company. On 6 November 2005 she was elected Member of Parliament from Tovuz Constituency No. 105. She is also a member of the Azerbaijan-India, Azerbaijan-Turkey and Azerbaijan-Japan working groups on interparliamentary relations.

=== Bahrain ===
- Lateefa Al Gaood

First female elected to the Council of Representatives of Bahrain in 2006 and is the only female to ever have been a council member.

- Nada Haffadh

First ever female cabinet minister when she was appointed as the minister of health in 2004. She also served within the upper house of parliament in the Consultative Council in 2007.

=== Bangladesh ===
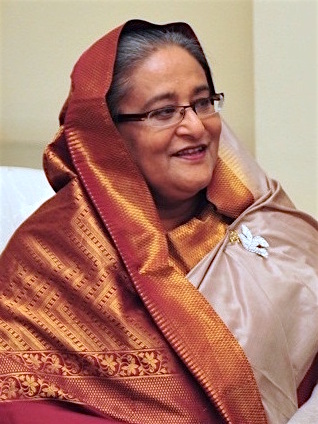
Sheikh Hasina

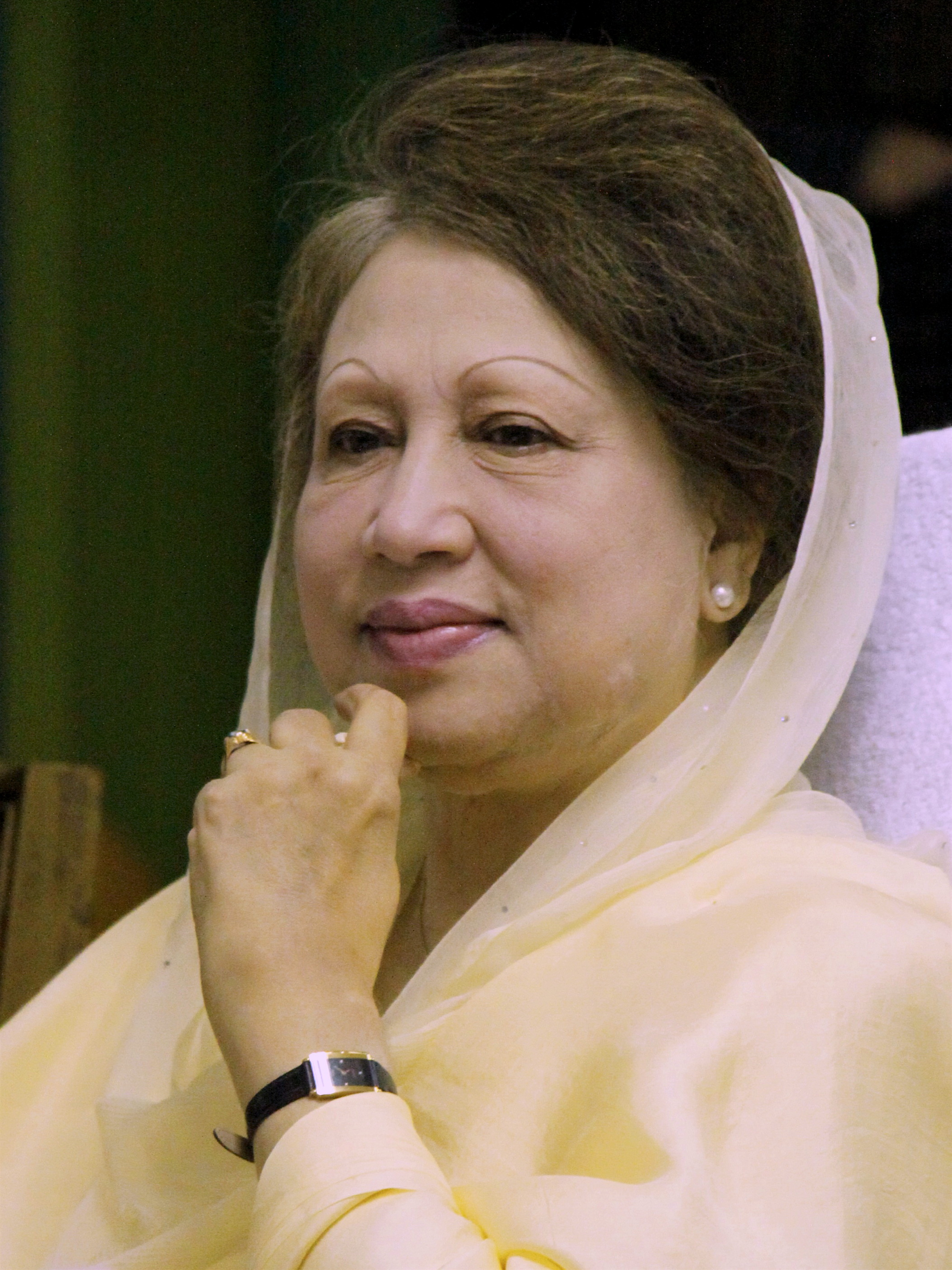
Khaleda Zia

The two women have ruled Bangladesh as prime ministers since 1991.

As the third most populous Muslim-majority country, Bangladesh has been ruled, as of 2023, for the last 32 years by female prime ministers by electing Khaleda Zia and Sheikh Hasina as prime ministers.

- Sheikh Hasina

Prime Minister of Bangladesh from 1996 to 2001 and 2009–2024. She is a member of the Council of Women World Leaders.

- Khaleda Zia

Prime Minister of Bangladesh from 1991 to 1996 and 2001–2006. When elected in 1991 she became the first female prime minister of Bangladesh and the second female leader in the Muslim world to be a leader of a democratic government. She is also the chairperson and leader of the Bangladesh Nationalist Party. Zia has been ranked by Forbes three times as one of the "100 Most Powerful Women in the World".

=== Egypt ===
Nearly one-third of the Parliament of Egypt – the fifth most populous Muslim majority nation – also consists of women.

- Rawya Ateya

In 1956 she became the first woman to be commissioned as an officer in the Liberation Army of Egypt. She is considered to be a pioneer for female leaders in Muslim-majority countries. She was the first female Parliamentarian in the Arab world when in 1957 she served in the Parliament of Egypt. She was an advocate for women's right and managed to implement a two-month materntity leave. She lost her bid for relelcetion two years later but was able to get elected to the People's Assembly in 1984.

- Farida El Choubachy

She is the first woman in 42 years to preside over the opening session of the Egyptian parliament. She is part of the newly elected Egyptian parliament.

- Nadia Ahmed Abdou Saleh

Her political career started in 2010 when she was elected to the parliament as part of the National Democratic Party. In February 2017 she became Egypt's first female governor. She was apportioned governor of the Baheira Governorate.

- Eva Habil

She became the Egypt's first female mayor of Kom Buha in 2008. She won against five other male candidates, one of the candidates was her brother. Her father was the previous mayor there until 2002. She has worked on ending female circumcision and increasing literacy rates for women.

- Anissa Hassouna

In 2016 she was elected to the Egyptian Parliament. She has advocated for women's and children's rights. One of her initiatives was to create playgrounds for children in every district. In 2019 she also worked on creating a law that would ban the use of plastic bags.

=== Indonesia ===
The most populous Muslim-majority country.

- Megawati Sukarnoputri

She is the daughter of the first president of Indonesia Sukarno. She was elected to the People's Consultative Assembly in 1987. She later served as the head of the Indonesian Democratic Party in 1993. She served as president of Indonesia from 2001 to 2004, becoming the first female president of Indonesia and the fourth female to lead a Muslim-majority nation.

=== Jordan ===
There are 15 seats reserved in the lower house for women.

- Toujan al-Faisal

She became Jordan's first female member of Parliament when elected in 1993. She faced much backlash as a female in this position, including arrests and mistreatment while imprisoned, causing global outcry and the assistance of Amnesty International. She was denied her request to stand as a candidate in the parliamentary elections of 17 June 2003 by the Elections Committee.

=== Kosovo ===
- Atifete Jahjaga

In the Muslim majority territory of Kosovo, President Atifete Jahjaga was unanimously elected by the Assembly of Kosovo on April 7, 2011.

- Vjosa Osmani

Vjosa Osmani served as chairwoman of the Assembly of Kosovo from 2020 to 2021, and was elevated to acting president of Kosovo in November 2020, following the resignation of Hashim Thaçi. She was elected in her own right as president in April 2021.

=== Kyrgyzstan ===
- Roza Otunbayeva

Kyrgyzstan has a Muslim majority. Otunbayeva was sworn in as President on 3 July 2010, after acting as interim leader following the Tulip Revolution.

=== Morocco ===
- Mbarka Bouaida

In July 2019 Mbarka Bouaida was elected as the president of the Guelmim-Oued Noun region. Making her the first woman elected as a regional leader in Morocco. Her political career first began when she was elected in 2007 to the House of Representatives. She served on many committee during her time in the House of Representatives including the Finance and Economic Affairs Committee, the Islamic Affairs Committee, and the National Defense committee.

- Latifa Jbabdi

She is a feminist activist fighting for human rights and women's rights. In 1977 she was arrested and held for three years as a political prisoner for her involvement with leftist political activity. After leaving prison she resumed her fight for humans right and was one of the founding members of the Moroccan Association for Human Rights. She worked on leading the initiative on reforming Moroccan family law called the Moudawana. Latifa Jbabdi was led the women's rights group known as the Women's Action Union (UAF). This group in collaboration with others launched the one million signature campaign to reform the Moudawana. The final reforms were implemented in 2004 and gave women new rights such as the right to divorce and the right to child custody. She gained political office in 2007 as a member of the Moroccan Parliament and later left in 2011.

=== Pakistan ===
Pakistan is the world's second most populous Muslim-majority country.

- Fatima Jinnah

She was the sister of Quaid-e-Azam Muhammad Ali Jinnah, the founder of Pakistan. She played a fierce role for the independence of Pakistan. After independence, she played her part for women empowerment. In 1965, upon the request of unified opposition, she ran a presidential campaign against the then military dictator. She is considered the mother of the Pakistani nation. She is buried at Mazar-e-Quaid Mausoleum.

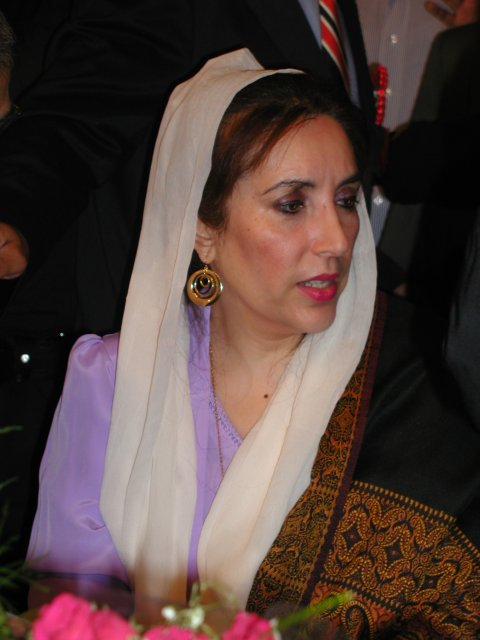
The late Benazir Bhutto, former prime minister of Pakistan.

- Benazir Bhutto

In 1982 Bhutto became the first female in Pakistan to lead a political party, the Pakistan People's Party. Her father, Zulfiqar Ali Bhutto, founded the Pakistan People's Party in 1968. She was elected twice as the prime minister of Pakistan. Her first election to prime minister in 1988 made her the first woman to lead a Muslim-majority country. She served in this position from 1988 to 1990 and from 1993 to 1996. She was assassinated as a candidate in the 2008 election for prime minister.

=== Romania ===
- Sevil Shhaideh

She was nominated, but never served, as Prime-Minister in the country with by contrast, more than 80 percent of Romanians are Orthodox Christians, while fewer than 1 percent are Muslims.

=== Saudi Arabia ===
- Reema bint Bandar bin Sultan bin Abdulaziz Al Saud

She was appointed as the country's ambassador to the United States on 2019. She is the first woman ever appointed as ambassador in Saudi Arabia. She grew up in the United States attended George Washington University. Her father served as the previous country's ambassador to the United States previously. She was featured on Forbes list of the top 200 Most Powerful Arab Women. Before she became ambassador she was Vice President of Women's Affairs at the Saudi General Sports Authority in 2016. In 2018 she became President of the Mass Participation Federation and served in that position until becoming ambassador.

=== Senegal ===
- Mame Madior Boye

She was elected as the minister of justice in 2000 and was prime minister from 2001 to 2002. She is the first female in Senegal to hold this position.

=== Tunisia ===
- Najla Bouden

On 11 October 2021, Bouden became the first female prime minister in the Arab world. Before becoming prime minister she was director general in charge of quality at the Ministry of Higher Education and Scientific Research. Where she was in charge of overseeing World Bank programs. Additionally she was a professor of geosciences at the National Engineering School in Tunisia. She was appointed after the president Kais Saiedth removed the former prime minister and suspended the parliament in July 2021.

=== Turkey ===
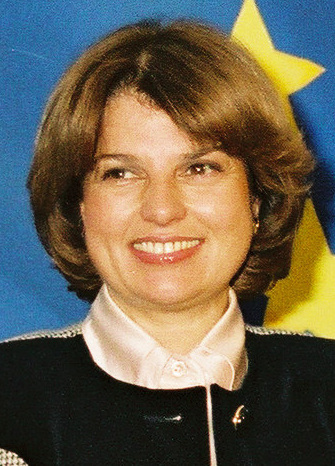
Tansu Çiller is the first and only female prime minister of Turkey.

- Tansu Çiller

Became Prime Minister of Turkey in 1993. Four Muslim countries have been or are currently led by women because of successions after deceased fathers, husbands, etc. Çiller, however, won her position as prime minister entirely on her own. Çiller attended Robert College and later received her Master's and Ph.D. Çiller returned to Turkey and taught economics at Boğaziçi University after her husband was offered a good job. She entered politics in 1990 by joining the True Path Party (which she is now the president of) under Süleyman Demirel. Çiller quickly became assistant of the party, and then entered the 1991 election where she won and received the responsibility for ministry of economy in the government. President Turgut Özal died in 1993, so Demirel took his position as president. Çiller saw her chance and took it, for she won the position as prime minister in June 1993. Çiller's supporters favor her modernization/westernization ideas. Despite her followers, Çiller also had many people against her reforms. Çiller was forced to leave the government after she made some unpopular actions as prime minister. Her questionable decisions led to three different parliamentary investigations on her, so Çiller decided to leave office in 1996. Despite her mistakes, Çiller still remains powerful today.

Since 1996, the number of women in the parliament has been continually on the rise. Female representation rate did not fall below 10 percent after the 2007 elections.

=== Other ===
Other Muslim female national political leaders include Cissé Mariam Kaïdama Sidibé, Sitt al-Mulk (in eleventh century), Sibel Siber and Aminata Touré.

== Queens ==
There are several medieval queens, including the Arwa al-Sulayhi (1067–1138) of Yemen, Zainab Tari (1089–1098) of Sindh, Razia Sultan (1236–1240) of Delhi and Queen Badit in Ethiopia whose reign ended in 1063.

- Sitt al-Mulk, Regent of the Fatimid Caliphate
- Asma bint Shihab, Sulayhid Malika of Yemen
- Arwa al-Sulayhi, Sulayhid Sultana of Yemen
- Zainab Tari, Soomra Emira of Sindh
- Terken Khatun, Regent of Seljuk Empire
- Mama Hatun, Saltukid Bey of Erzurum
- Razia Sultan, Mamluk Sultan of Delhi
- Shajar al-Durr, Mamluk Sultan of Egypt
- Sati Beg, Il khan
- Khadijah, Theemuge Sultana of the Maldives

=== Jordan ===
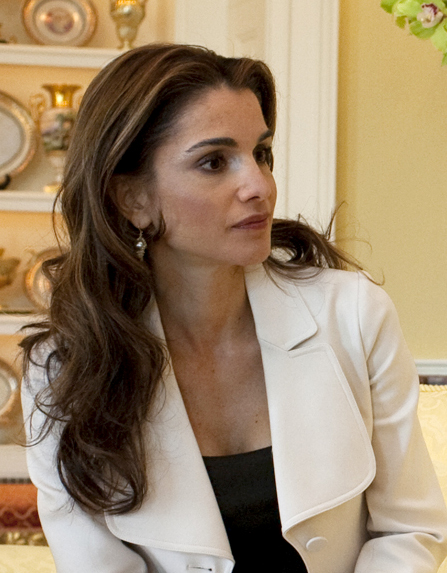
Queen Rania in Washington, DC

Queen Rania of Jordan

She was proclaimed Queen by her husband on 7 February 1999. She uses her position to advocate for better education, health, and tribal community empowerment. She attempts to empower women and the youth within her own country. Jordan has many laws which discriminate against women, this is at odds with the opinion of the Royal Family. Globally, she works with the United Nations Children's Fund and the United Nations Girls' Education Initiative, as well as promotes dialogues for tolerance between different cultures. She was also ranked in 2011 as one of the "World's Most Powerful Women" by Forbes.

== Political history by country ==
Muslim women's roles and opportunities in public office vary depending on the country/region and the type of government in power. For this reason, one cannot generalize the subject of Muslim female political leaders. It is best to look at the histories of each country to get a better understanding of how Muslim women's roles have evolved over time.

=== Afghanistan ===
Muslim women generally do not participate in public office in Afghanistan. However, there have been drastic changes and attempts throughout history to increase their participation in the government. King Amir Aman Allah (1919–29) was overthrown because he tried to liberate women, and Muhammad Dawud (1953–63) attempted public unveiling. In 1967, a delegated Afghan woman participated in a conference on Asian women in Ceylon, and in 1958 a female delegate was sent to the United States. King Zahir Shah (1933–73) formally announced voluntary end of female seclusion in 1959. During the constitutional period (1963–73), the liberal constitution accorded significant rights to women (i.e. right to vote and right to education). The king appointed two women to the Constitutional Advisory Commission, and the loya Jirga (Grand Assembly) included four women. Four women were elected in the 1965 elections, where Miss Kubra Nurzai became minister for Public Health (first female minister in Afghanistan), and Mrs. Shafiqa Ziayee became a minister who remained without portfolio in Etemadi's second cabinet (1969–71). The People's Democratic Party (PDPA) (a progressive agenda for women's rights) and the Democratic Organization of Afghan Women were established in 1965.

The Taliban then emerged in 1996 and enforced a drastic reduction of women's freedom. Women were not allowed to receive education or employment, and many women were fired from their government positions. Overall, it was very hard for women to work under Taliban rule. In December 2001 after the fall of the Taliban, the Bonn Process worked to make Afghan women a more active political force. The 2002 Loya Jirga endorsed the Transitional Administration, which included three women out of twenty-one commissioners. 12.5% of the delegates in the loya Jirga were women, and one woman was even elected as vice chair of the loya Jirga. The Ministry of Women's Affairs (MOWA) was established in 2002. The government of Afghanistan signed the Convention for the Elimination of all forms of Discrimination Against Women (CEDAW) in 2003. In 2004, Afghanistan reserved seats for female candidates in legislative elections for the first time. As a result, almost 30% of the women won their seats on their own (not because they were reserved), and 68 women (27%) were also elected to parliament. Although there has been significant improvement of women's participation in public office, men are still the majority in the government and therefore still tend to make the final decisions.

=== Arab States ===
In 2005, women occupied 5.7% of all parliamentary seats in the region, as compared to 12-15% in other regions. Some Arab countries have tried to adopt legislation to increase women's participation, but the laws are never usually enforced. Some Arab countries have also adopted quotas that guarantee the representation of women. For example, Morocco reserves 30 seats of 325 and Jordan reserves 6 of 110 seats for women. Although women are still underrepresented, their participation is rising. For example, the number of female politicians elected in Morocco in 2003 rose from 84 to 127 (out of 22,944 elected officials, though). The king of Morocco appointed Zoulikha Nasri as first female royal counselor. The Arab states employ more women in key positions at a ministerial level. For example, Lebanon ranks fourth in the world and Jordan ranks eighth for most women employed at this level. The United Arab Emirate's Ministry of education (UAE) reported that there were more female than male workers in more than 25 federal ministries. In 2001, there were 16,223 women versus only 9,518 men.

Although women are gaining more opportunities in public office, 68% of Arab women in political life now are dissatisfied with the current level of female political participation. Women want to continue to progress and eventually hold key decision-making positions. Female candidates also have to put gender issues second and national issues first in order to get the male vote. Laws regarding women and their right to vote in office are still weak and not well-enforced. Many Arab people continue to exclude women from public/political positions and some political regimes promote this as well. Many familial dynamics still promote male over female political participation in the current century as well.

=== Azerbaijan ===
In Azerbaijan, placing women in government has progressed better than in other Islamic countries. Universal suffrage was introduced in Azerbaijan in 1918 by the Azerbaijan Democratic Republic, thus making Azerbaijan the first Muslim-majority countries ever to enfranchise women. Now, 28 women are members in the Azerbaijan Parliament (Milli Məclis). As of 2015, there were 21 women in the 125-seat parliament. The percentage of female members of parliament increased from 11 to 17 percent between 2005 and 2015. Traditional social norms and lagging economic development in the country's rural regions continued to restrict the role of women in the economy, and there were reports that women had difficulty exercising their legal rights due to gender discrimination. As of May 2009, women held the positions of Deputy Chairman of the Constitutional Court, Deputy Chairman of the Nakhchivan AR Cabinet of Ministers, four Deputy Ministers, an Ambassador, and Ombudsmen of Azerbaijan and Nakhchivan AR. Women constituted 4 of the 16 members of the Central Election Commission and chaired of 3 of the 125 district election commissions. Though a secular country, Azerbaijan requires certification and registration for people performing religious rites. Muslim women in Azerbaijan can study to become certified mullahs and lead women-only gatherings, a tradition that goes back centuries. In 2000, Azerbaijan signed up to the Optional Protocol of CEDAW, recognizing the competence of the Committee on the Elimination of Discrimination against Women, after which it can receive and consider complaints from individuals or groups within its jurisdiction. A new domestic violence law went into force in 2010, which criminalized spousal abuse, including marital rape. Rape is illegal in Azerbaijan and carries a maximum 15-year prison sentence.

=== Central Asia ===
During the Russian Empire, the participation of women in public office was not possible in Muslim territories. The Communist Party of the Soviet Union ruled after the Russian Empire, and the first women were elected to local and central governing bodies because of its new policies. This representation was low, however, until the end of the 1930s. In Turkestan, fewer than half of the elected female delegates in 1926 represented the Muslim population. In 1925, Soviets worked to create more opportunities for women to participate at all levels of public and political life. The Communist Party took steps to enable Muslim women to be active in public and political life. One requirement was increasing female representation in public office. Throughout Soviet history, only two women were appointed to the position of minister (culture and health). The Communist Party gave women secondary positions rather than top positions, so although their participation was increasing, their roles were not as important as their male counterparts. Only Yadgar Nasretddinova was able to achieve the highest levels of power in the Soviet system from the 1940s to 1970s. Yagar occupied Chair of Supreme Soviet in Uzbek SSR and Chair of Upper Chamber of Supreme Soviet of USSR. Women appointed by the Soviet government were not appointed for their educational or professional abilities, but rather by their social origin. This led to many non-professional women and men in positions of power, and as a result, women in politics and in power were seen in a negative light. Women in general were stereotyped as incapable of making decisions. Actual equality never was achieved, but the goal of changing historical traditions where women were not allowed in power was met. Despite its successes, this process, called Sovietization, had a lot of hidden barriers and regulations for women. The quota system practiced by the Soviet regime was abolished in 1989 and as a result many women lost their positions in the government. 26% of the members in the Turkish parliament during the post-Soviet period were women. 9.9% of the parliament in Uzbekistan was also women. 14.9% of the Tajikistan parliament was women in 2000. Equal rights and opportunities laws have been drafted in most Muslim countries of Central Asia; however, women are still stuck in secondary positions because of traditional patriarchal views of women.

=== Egypt ===
Women have been active participants since the 1919 Egyptian revolution, demanding the liberation of Egypt. However, when the 1923 constitution was ratified, it did not give men and women equal rights. This led to the formation of the Egyptian Women's Union and the Muslim Women's Society. Their aim was to establish equal rights in the social and political domain. In 1952, after the fall of the monarchy, feminist movements advocated for women's right to be included in the new Egyptian constitution. In the 1956 constitution women were given the right to vote and stand for elections. In 1957, for the first time, seven women ran for elected office. Amina Shokry and Rawya Ateya then became the first women elected to the Egyptian parliament. Although women were granted political rights, women's activists were still fighting for equal social rights. During Abdel Nasser's reign, legislation was introduced that all civil society organizations were now under state control. This period is referred to as "State-feminism". In 1979, President Anwar Al Sadat issued a law allocating thirty parliamentary seats for women, which increased the number of women in parliament from eight to thirty-five. This law was later rescinded in 1986 due to a revision of electoral laws. During the Mubarak era, the number of women's organizations increased from 10,000 to 30,000. In 2000, the National Council for Women was established. New laws were established giving women the right to divorce without her husbands consent (Khul'). Additionally new measures were added to facilitate access to court for 'urfi marriages, religious marriages not officially registered with the state. A new marriage contract was also enacted that included a list for conditions in the appendix. Women were granted a quota of 64 seats for the 2010 election. This quota lasted until the 25th of January 2011 Egyptian revolution. The following elections had an unprecedented turnout rate but less than two percent of women were elected. For the 2020 elections, a new constitutional amendment was passed allocating 25 percent of seats for women in parliament. Women won 162 out of the 596 seats, making them 27 percent of the Egyptian parliament for the 2021 to 2026 term.

=== Iran ===
Women actively participated in the Iranian Constitutional Revolution of 1905–06, which recognized all citizens as equal. The electoral law of 1906, however, denied women the right to vote. Women voted for the first time in the 1963 referendum on the White Revolution (reform introduced by Mohammad Reza Shah). The government did not allow women's participation in the 1963 vote, but they also did not deny them the right to set up their own ballots and vote. Women also voted in the September 1963 parliamentary elections. For the first time, six women were elected to parliament, and the Shah appointed two other women to the senate. The number of women deputies also increased in the following parliamentary elections. In 1978, on the eve of the Islamic Revolution, 22 women were in the parliament. Women retained the right to vote after the Islamic Revolution, and four were elected to parliament under the Islamic Republic. In the 2000 Majlis elections, 13 women were elected to parliament. In the 1960s and 1970s, Farrukhru Parsa was elected as minister of education and Mahnaz Afkhami as minister of state for women's affairs. The position of minister of state for women's affairs was abolished in 1978. Today, Iranian women are still working to gain more rights in the political sphere.

=== Tunisia ===
Tunisia gained its independence from France in 1956. In the same year the Code of Personal Status (CPS) was enacted, reforming family law and aiming to establish equality between women and men. The CPS banned the practice of polygamy, required consent from both sides for marriage, and set a minimum age for marriage. It also gave women the ability to initiate divorce and mandated that divorce procedures must be done in secular courts. Women gained the right to vote in 1957 and the ability to run for political office in 1959. However, it wasn't until twenty years later, in 1983, that women were elected political office. Fethia Mzali and Souad Yaacoubi were the first women to hold political office. In 1985, Tunisia ratified the Convention on the Elimination of All Forms of Discrimination Against Women. However, there were some reservations made. In 1983, changes to the CPS continued to expand women's rights such as the passage of citizenship matrilineally and custody of children following divorce. Following the Jasmine revolution, women's movements fought to insure the existence of the CPS in the new government and that women would be guaranteed equal rights in the constitution. In 2011 a quota was passed requiring parties using parliamentary lists to alternate between men and women. In 2016 an additional provision was made to the quota stating that the parties using parliamentary lists also had to have their list headed by women.

=== Turkey ===
Women's formal political participation began with the Turkish Republic. A group of women attempted to establish a women's party after the rise of the Turkish Republic but were denied. The legal status of women changed between 1920 and 1935. Turkish women were granted political rights much earlier than women in other Islamic or European countries. They were allowed to vote for local elections in 1930 and national elections in 1934. There was also a lot of support from single party leaders for more women's participation in government between 1930 and 1946. In the 1935 national elections, 18 women (4.6%) were elected to parliament. There was, however, a decline in the participation of women after the multi-party regime. Until 1984, the percentage of women in parliament was between .61 and 1.76. After 1984, there was a slight increase, but the percentage of women still never surpassed that of 1935. For example, in the 2002 election, 24 (4.5%) were women. Thirteen of 365 women were in the Justice and Development Party (AKP) and eleven of 177 were in the social-democratic Republican People's Party (CHP). Between 1935 and 2004, 126 women were members of the parliament, but 48.9% of them did not get the opportunity for a second term. Therefore, of 8,517 seats, only 183 (2.1%) women occupied them.

Women in Turkish government are generally concentrated in areas associated with traditional women's roles (i.e. education and health). Only 14 women have taken part in 16 cabinets occupying 28 ministerial posts since 1971. Tansu Çiller, leader of the True Path Party (DYP) became the first female prime minister in Turkey and served until 1996. It is statistically proven that the total number of women working in public office has been increasing at a faster rate than males.

Prime Minister office abolished in Turkey in 2018.

Since 1995, the number of women in the parliament has been continually on the rise. Female representation rate did not fall below 10 percent after the 2007 elections.

== Movements ==
By the nineteenth century, Muslim women began creating women's organizations aimed at including women as public leaders. During this time, women began to advocate for higher education, along with protesting the full veiling they were forced to wear. Debate on such issues gave certain women access to public roles, specifically women of higher classes. Western ideals may be responsible for influencing certain women to become activists and obtain public leadership roles. The nineteenth century also marked the reformation of certain social restrictions and oppression toward women, specifically regarding education, polygamy, and the arranged marriage of a young girl to a much older man.

Wardah al-Yaziji and Wardah al-Turk, two educated women in Syria, began writing Aishah al-Taymuriyah of Egypt during the 1860s and 1870s. The women discussed potential reforms for their gender in hopes of raising awareness of gender inequality. Around the same time, and in contribution to this publication, Hind Nawfal, an immigrant from Syria to Alexandria, published a monthly women's piece in Arabic called Al-fatah. In 1891, Zaynab Fawwaz, also an immigrant to Alexandria, published the newspaper Al-nil. Such actions are considered some of the first marks of Muslim feminism.

At the beginning of the twentieth century, women began participating in national movements and campaigns. Women in Iran participated in the Tobacco Rebellion and the Constitutional Revolution in 1908. As a result, upper-class women founded political societies that aimed at increasing rights for women in education and politics. Such national participation helped counter female seclusion in Muslim society.

Following World War I, gender issues were highlighted as an area to reform. Iran, Tunisia, and Egypt all addressed controversial topics of women's rights in divorce and child custody while reforming amendments. Iran and Turkey began strongly opposing the need of head scarfs. Such reformations have continued through the twenty-first century.

== See also ==
- Female figures in the Quran
- Sultana (title), the female title parallel to a sultan; a Muslim woman leader
- Women in Islam
- Sex segregation in Islam
- Women as imams
