= List of the first women heads of state and government in Muslim-majority countries =

This is a chronological list of the first women to be heads of state and heads of government in Muslim-majority countries, excluding those who held the role in a temporary capacity.

== List ==
In office

Entries in italics indicate states with limited international recognition.

Portrait	Head of government or state	Country	Status	In office
	Elizabeth II	Pakistan	Queen of Pakistan	6 February 1952 – 23 March 1956
	Elizabeth II	Nigeria	Queen of Nigeria	1 October 1960 – 1 October 1963
	Elizabeth II	Sierra Leone	Queen of Sierra Leone	27 April 1961 – 19 April 1971
	Elizabeth II	The Gambia	Queen of the Gambia	18 February 1965 – 24 April 1970
	Benazir Bhutto	Pakistan	Prime Minister of Pakistan	2 December 1988 – 6 August 1990; 18 October 1993 – 5 November 1996
	Khaleda Zia	Bangladesh	Prime Minister of Bangladesh	20 March 1991 – 30 March 1996; 10 October 2001 – 29 October 2006
	Tansu Çiller	Turkey	Prime Minister of Turkey	25 June 1993 – 6 March 1996
	Mame Madior Boye	Senegal	Prime Minister of Senegal	3 March 2001 – 4 November 2002
	Megawati Sukarnoputri	Indonesia	President of Indonesia	23 July 2001 – 20 October 2004
	Roza Otunbayeva	Kyrgyzstan	President of Kyrgyzstan	3 July 2010 – 1 December 2011
	Cissé Mariam Kaïdama Sidibé	Mali	Prime Minister of Mali	3 April 2011 – 22 March 2012
	Sibel Siber	Northern Cyprus	Prime Minister of Northern Cyprus	13 June 2013 – 2 September 2013
	Atifete Jahjaga	Kosovo	President of Kosovo	7 April 2011 – 7 April 2016
	Najla Bouden	Tunisia	Prime Minister of Tunisia	11 October 2021 – 1 August 2023
	Željka Cvijanović	Bosnia and Herzegovina	Serb Member of the Presidency	16 November 2022 – present
	Borjana Krišto	Bosnia and Herzegovina	Chairwoman of the Council of Ministers	25 January 2023 – present
	Fatima Ezzahra El Mansouri	Morocco	Prime Minister of Morocco	29 September 2026 – present

== See also ==
- List of Muslim women heads of state and government
- List of elected and appointed female heads of state and government
- Muslim women political leaders
- Council of Women World Leaders
- Women in government
- Lists of women politicians
- Society-related timelines
