= Sheikh Muhammad (disambiguation) =

Sheikh Muhammad (1560–1650) was a Muslim saint-poet who is venerated by Hindus.

Sheikh Muhammad or alternatively Sheikh Muhammed, Sheikh Mohammad, Sheikh Mohammed may also refer to (in chronological birth order):

- Sheikh Muhammad ibn Abd al-Wahhab (1703–1792), religious leader and theologian from Najd in central Arabia who founded the movement now called Wahhabism
- Sheikh Mohammed Abdullah (1905–1982), Kashmiri politician
- Sheikh Mohamed Siddiq El-Minshawi (1920–1969), Egyptian Qur'anic reciter
- Sheikh Mohammed bin Rashid Al Maktoum (born 1949), Vice President and Prime Minister of the United Arab Emirates (UAE), and ruler of the Emirate of Dubai
- Sheikh Mohammed Karakunnu (born 1950), Indian Islamic scholar and author
- Sheikh Muhammad Tahir Rasheed (born 1954), also known as Tahir Rashid, Pakistani politician who is affiliated with the Pakistan Muslim League
- Sheikh Muhammad Nuru Khalid (born 1960), Nigerian Islamic cleric
- Sheikh Mohamed bin Zayed Al Nahyan (born 1961), president of the United Arab Emirates and ruler of Abu Dhabi
