= List of Muslim women heads of state and government =

This is a list of female Muslim heads of state and heads of government. Some countries do not have a Muslim-majority. The list is chronological.

== List ==
In office

Portrait	Head of government or state	Country	Status	In office (first time)
	Benazir Bhutto	Pakistan	Prime Minister of Pakistan	2 December 1988 – 6 August 1990; 18 October 1993 – 5 November 1996
	Khaleda Zia	Bangladesh	Prime Minister of Bangladesh	20 March 1991 – 30 March 1996; 10 October 2001 – 29 October 2006
	Tansu Çiller	Turkey	Prime Minister of Turkey	25 June 1993 – 6 March 1996
	Sheikh Hasina	Bangladesh	Prime Minister of Bangladesh	23 June 1996 – 15 July 2001; 6 January 2009 – 5 August 2024
	Mame Madior Boye	Senegal	Prime Minister of Senegal	3 March 2001 – 4 November 2002
	Megawati Sukarnoputri	Indonesia	President of Indonesia	23 July 2001 – 20 October 2004
	Roza Otunbayeva	Kyrgyzstan	President of Kyrgyzstan	7 April 2010 – 1 December 2011
	Atifete Jahjaga	Kosovo	President of Kosovo	7 April 2011 – 7 April 2016
	Cissé Mariam Kaïdama Sidibé	Mali	Prime Minister of Mali	3 April 2011 – 22 March 2012
	Sibel Siber	Northern Cyprus	Prime Minister of Northern Cyprus	13 June 2013 – 2 September 2013
	Aminata Touré	Senegal	Prime Minister of Senegal	3 September 2013 – 8 July 2014
	Ameenah Gurib-Fakim	Mauritius	President of Mauritius	5 June 2015 – 23 March 2018
	Halimah Yacob	Singapore	President of Singapore	14 September 2017 – 13 September 2023
	Samia Suluhu	Tanzania	President of Tanzania	19 March 2021 – Incumbent
	Vjosa Osmani	Kosovo	President of Kosovo	4 April 2021 – 4 April 2026
	Najla Bouden	Tunisia	Prime Minister of Tunisia	29 September 2021 – 1 August 2023
	Sara Zaafarani	Tunisia	Prime Minister of Tunisia	21 March 2025 – Incumbent
	Fatima Ezzahra El Mansouri	Morocco	Prime Minister of Morocco	29 September 2026 – Incumbent

== See also ==
- List of the first women heads of state and government in Muslim-majority countries
- List of elected and appointed female heads of state and government
- Muslim women political leaders
- Council of Women World Leaders
- Women in government
- Lists of women politicians
- Society-related timelines
