= List of Marathi Muslims =

This is a list of notable Marathi Muslims categorized by their professions. Marathi Muslims are defined as Muslims whose native language is Marathi and who are culturally integrated into Maharashtra.

== Historical Figures ==
=== Mughal Era ===
==== Shivaji Trusties ====
- Siddi Hilal
- Daulat Khan
- Ibrahim Khan
- Kazi Haider
- Siddi Ibrahim
- Siddi Wahwah
- Noorkhan Beg
- Shama Khan
- Hussain Khan Miyani
- Siddi Mistri
- Sultan Khan
- Dawood Khan
- Madari Mehetar
- Shaikh Muhammad (1560–1650) – Marathi Muslim saint-poet from Shrigonda in Ahmednagar district. He is known for his spiritual and devotional poetry written in Marathi, especially his most famous work, Yoga-samgrama. He was deeply influenced by the Nath tradition and propagated unity between Hindu and Muslim spiritual paths.
- Haji Malang – A 12th-century Sufi saint whose shrine is located in Kalyan, Maharashtra. The shrine is a popular symbol of syncretic culture and is visited by both Hindus and Muslims.
- Hazrat Turabul Haq Shah – also known as Turatpeer Baba, was a revered Sufi saint of Parbhani. His dargah is a center of pilgrimage and is known for its annual Urs that promotes communal harmony in Maharashtra.
- Abdul Qadir Bawazeer – Islamic scholar and reformer from Maharashtra, known for being a close associate of Mahatma Gandhi during his stay in South Africa. Gandhi referred to him as "sahodar" (brother).
- Hamid Dalwai (1932–1977) – noted social reformer, writer, and thinker who advocated for women's rights and modern reforms within the Muslim community. He founded the Muslim Satyashodhak Mandal and wrote extensively in Marathi.
- Shahir Amar Shaikh – prominent Marathi folk poet and performer who used the traditional form of powada to address social injustice and promote unity. He is recognized as one of the key cultural voices of the working class.
- Aziz Khan Pathan – contemporary Marathi poet and lyricist known for blending traditional Marathi expression with themes relevant to the Muslim experience in the state.

== Politics ==
- Husain Dalwai – Social worker, politician (Indian National Congress), and Rajya Sabha member.
- Abu Asim Azmi – Politician (Samajwadi Party), Member of the Maharashtra Legislative Council.
- Nawab Malik – Politician (Nationalist Congress Party), former Maharashtra Cabinet Minister.

=== British era ===
- Abdul Karim Naik – Freedom fighter and leader in the Indian independence movement.

== Literature and arts ==
- M. F. Husain – Widely known as the "Picasso of India," Husain was instrumental in shaping modern Indian art with his fusion of traditional themes and contemporary techniques.
- Ismail Abdul Rahiman Undre (Azad) – Poet and writer in Marathi.
- S. M. Ibrahim – Freedom fighter and Marathi writer.

== Saints ==
- Shaikh Muhammad (1560–1650) – Marathi Muslim saint-poet from Shrigonda in Ahmednagar district. He is known for his spiritual and devotional poetry written in Marathi, especially his most famous work, Yoga-samgrama. He was deeply influenced by the Nath tradition and propagated unity between Hindu and Muslim spiritual paths.
- Haji Malang – 12th-century Sufi saint whose shrine is located in Kalyan, Maharashtra. The shrine is a popular symbol of syncretic culture and is visited by both Hindus and Muslims.
- Hazrat Turabul Haq Shah – also known as Turatpeer Baba, was a revered Sufi saint of Parbhani. His dargah is a center of pilgrimage and is known for its annual Urs that promotes communal harmony in Maharashtra.
- Abdul Qadir Bawazeer – Islamic scholar and reformer from Maharashtra, known for being a close associate of Mahatma Gandhi during his stay in South Africa. Gandhi referred to him as "sahodar" (brother).

== Sports ==
=== Cricketers ===
- Zaheer Khan – Former Indian cricketer and fast bowler.
- Aavishkar Salvi
- Wasim Jaffer

== Arts and entertainment ==
- Salim Arif – Theatre director and filmmaker.

== Social work and academia ==
- Sabah Khan – Social activist and co-founder of Parcham Collective (works with Marathi Muslim women).

== Diospora ==
=== Uttrakhand ===
- Ra'ana Liaquat Ali Khan

=== UAE ===
- Zulekha Daud – UAE's first woman doctor

== See also ==
- Marathi people
- Islam in India
