= List of Muezzins of the Two Holy Mosques =

Muezzins of Masjid al-Haram and Prophet's Mosque

This article provides the list of the Muezzins of the Two Holy Mosques (Arabic: مؤذنو الحرمين). They are responsible for calling the adhan (call to prayer) and the iqama (call to commence prayer) at the Masjid al-Haram in Mecca and the Prophet's Mosque in Medina. Muezzins are officially appointed by the General Presidency for the Affairs of the Two Holy Mosques under the authority of the King of Saudi Arabia.

== Masjid al-Haram ==
=== Current Muezzins ===
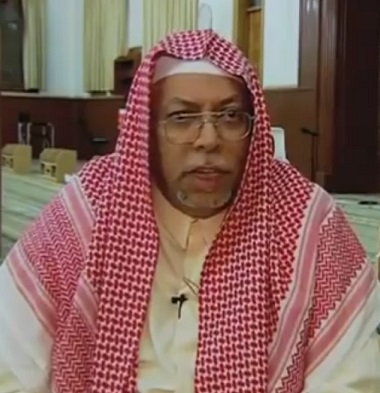
Ali Ahmed Mullah; the chief Muezzin at Masjid al-Haram

- Ali Ahmed Mullah (Arabic: عَلِي أَحْمَد مُلَّا), He began performing the adhan at the Masjid at the age of 14 in the absence of Abdul Hafeez Khoja, although he was appointed as a Muezzin at Masjid al-Haram in 1975.
- Muhammad Ali Shakir (Arabic: محمد علي شاكر)
- Majid Ibrahim Al-Abbās (Arabic: ماجد إبراهيم العباس), Appointed as a Muezzin during 2001.
- Ahmed Ali Nahhas (Arabic: أحمد علي نحاس), Appointed as Muezzin during July 2009.
- Saeed bin Omar Fallatah (Arabic: سعيد عمر فلاته), Appointed as Muezzin during 2013 Ramadan.
- Ahmed Younis Khoja (Arabic: أحمد يونس خوجه), Appointed as Muezzin during July 2009.
- Essam Ali Khan (Arabic: عصام علي خان), Appointed as Muezzin during July 2009.
- Hussain Shahat (Arabic: حسين حسن شحات), Appointed as a Muezzin during 2015.
- Hashim Saqqaf (Arabic: هاشم محمد السقاف), Appointed as a Muezzin during 2015.
- Muhammad BaSa'ad (Arabic: محمد أحمد باسعد), Appointed as a Muezzin during 2017.
- Sohail Hafiz (Arabic: سهيل عبدالمالك حافظ), Appointed as a Muezzin during 2017.
- Sami Rayes (Arabic: سامي عبدالرحيم الريس), Appointed as a Muezzin during 2017.
- Turki Hassani (Arabic: تركي طلال الحسني), Appointed as Muezzin during Ramadan 2018.
- Sheikh Muhammad ‘Amry (Arabic: محمد علي العمري), Appointed as Muezzin during Ramadan 2018.
- Abdullah Ba’Afeef (Arabic: عبدالله أحمد باعفيف), Appointed as Muezzin during Ramadan 2018.
- Naif Faydah (Arabic: نآيف فيده), Appointed as a Muezzin during Ramadan 1988.
- Atef Ali Mulla (Arabic: عاطف علي ملا) Appointed as a Muezzin during 2022.
- Towfeeq Khoj (Arabic: توفيق خوج)
- Emad Baqree (Arabic: عماد بقري), Appointed as a Muezzin during 2015.
- Ahmad Basnawi (Arabic: أحمد بصنوي)
- Hamd Daghreeree (Arabic: حمد دغريري), Appointed as Muezzin during 2013 Ramadan

=== Former Muezzins ===
- Mohammed Siraj Ma'arof (Arabic: محمد سراج معروف), Appointed as Muezzin at 1403 AH and continued until his death at December 2015.
- Abdullah bin Asaad Reis (Arabic: عبدالله بن أسعد ريس), Appointed as Muezzin during 1365 AH and continued until 1430 AH where he stopped due to illness and old age.
- Farooq Hadrawi (Arabic: فاروق حضراوي)
- Abdul Hafeez Khoj (Arabic: عبدالحفيظ خوج)
- Abdullah Basnawi (Arabic: عبد الله بصنوي)
- Ibrahim Al-Abbas (Arabic: إبراهيم العباس)
- Ibrahim Adil Al Madani (Arabic: إبراهيم عادل المدني), Appointed as Muezzin during Ramadan 2018; died 2026.
- Muhammad Muadhin (Arabic: محمد مؤذن), Appointed as Muezzin in 1970 and retired in 2025.
- Abdul Malik Mulla (Arabic: عبد الملك ملا), cousin of Sheikh Ali Ahmed Mulla and former Chief Muezzin before him.
- Abdul Lateef Mulla (Arabic: عبد اللطيف ملا), cousin of Sheikh Ali Ahmed Mulla.
- Muhammad Khalil Raml (Arabic: محمد خليل رمل)
- Salih Faydah (Arabic: صالح فيده), father of Sheikh Naif Faydah.
- Abdulrahman Basmaji (Arabic: عبد الرحمن بصمجي)

== Prophet's Mosque ==
=== Current Muezzins ===
- Abdulrahman bin Abdul-Ilah Khashoggi (Arabic: عبدالرحمن بن عبدالإله خاشقجي), The Chief Muezzin of the Mosque. At the age of 14 he decided to become an assistant of the senior muezzins until he was appointed as a muezzin.
- Essam bin Hussein Bukhari (Arabic: عصام بن حسين بخاري), Appointed as a Muezzin during 1965.
- Adil bin Abdulrahman Kaatib (Arabic: عادل بن عبدالرحمن كاتب), Appointed as a Muezzin during 2015.
- Mahdi Bin Youssef Barri (Arabic: مهدي بن يوسف بري), Appointed as a Muezzin during 2015.
- Umar bin Nabil Sunbul (Arabic: عمر بن نبيل سنبل), Appointed as a Muezzin during 2011.
- Muhammad bin Majid Hakim (Arabic: محمد بن ماجد حكيم), Appointed as a Muezzin during 2000.
- Osama bin Ibrahim Al-Akhdar Ali Al-Qayyim (Arabic: أسامة بن إبراهيم الأخضر علي القيم), Appointed as a Muezzin during 2015.
- Abdullah bin Hattab Al-Hunaini (Arabic: عبدالله بن خطاب الحنيني), Appointed as a Muezzin during 2015.
- Anas bin Nazih Al-Sharif (Arabic: أنس بن نزيه الشريف), Appointed as a Muezzin during 2015.
- Ahmed bin Mohammed Afifi (Arabic: أحمد بن محمد عفيفي), Appointed as a Muezzin during 2015.
- Saud bin Abdulaziz Bukhari (Arabic: سعود بن عبدالعزيز بخاري), Appointed as a Muezzin during 2011.
- Abdulmajid bin Salama Al-Suraihi (Arabic: عبدالمجيد بن سلامة السريحي), Appointed as a Muezzin during 2011.
- Ashraf bin Muhammad Afifi (Arabic: أشرف بن محمد عفيفي), Appointed as a Muezzin during 2011.
- Iyaad bin Ahmed Shukri (Arabic: إياد بن أحمد شكري), Appointed as a Muezzin during 2011.
- Muhammad bin Marwan Qassas (Arabic: محمد بن مروان قصاص), Appointed as a Muezzin during 2018.
- Hassan bin Abdul Rahman Khashoggi (Arabic: حسن بن عبدالرحمن خاشقجي), Appointed as a Muezzin during 2018.
- Ahmad ibn Muhammad al-Ansari (Arabic: أحمد بن محمد الأنصاري), Appointed as a Muezzin during 2018.
- Sami bin Mohammed Diouli (Arabic: سامي بن محمد ديولي), First gave Adhan in the Mosque during 1394 on behalf of his father.. Appointed during 1402 AH.
- Umar bin Youssef Kamal (Arabic: عمر بن يوسف كمال), Appointed as a Muezzin during 1401 AH.

=== Former Muezzin ===
- Faisal Abdul Malik Numan (Arabic: فيصل عبد الملك نعمان), appointed as Muezzin during 2001 and continued until his death at late 2025.
- Abdul Malik Numan (Arabic: عبد الملك نعمان), father of Faisal Abdul Malik Numan.
- Kamil Najdi
- Abdulazeez Bukhari
- Mustafa Nawman
- Abdul Mutalib Najdi
- Husain Afeefee
- Hussein Rajjab

== See also ==
- List of Imams of the Two Holy Mosques
