= The AccoLade =

- Origin: Jeddah, Saudi Arabia
- Genres: Alternative rock
- Years active: October 2008 - present
- Members: Dina, Lamia, Dareen, Amjaad

The AccoLade is the first all-female alternative rock band from Saudi Arabia. The band consists of four college students of King Abdulaziz University. The band's name comes from Edmund Leighton's painting The Accolade of a princess knighting a warrior.

The band's first single, Pinocchio, has become an underground hit with a quarter of a million downloads from the group's page on MySpace.

== Controversy ==
American pop culture magazine, Venus Zine, featured The AccoLade in its “25 under 25” list for 2009 for bringing “progressiveness and greater promise” to Saudi Arabia.
