= 'Ali al-Hudhayfi =

Imam in Medina

His Excellency Sheikh Ali bin Abdur Rahman Al Hudhaify
- علي بن عبد الرحمن الحذيفي
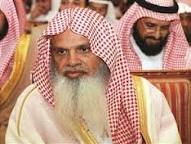

Personal life
- Born: 22 May 1947 (age 79) Al-Qarn Al-Mustaqim, Mecca Province, Saudi Arabia
- Children: Muhammad; Ahmed Ali; Abdul Rahman; Abdullah; Abdul Aziz
- Parent: Abdul Rahman Al-Hudhaify (father)
- Education: Imam Muhammad ibn Saud Islamic University; Al-Azhar University
- Occupation: Imam

Religious life
- Religion: Islam
- Jurisprudence: Hanbali
- Creed: Athari
- Movement: Sunni

Ali Bin Abdur Rahman Al Hudhaify (born 22 May 1947; Arabic: علي بن عبد الرحمن الحذيفي) is the chief Imam of Al-Masjid an-Nabawi, Medina. A former Imam of Quba Mosque, his style of reciting the Qur’an in a slow, deep tune is widely recognised. In 2026, he delivered the Hajj sermon to a multitude of pilgrims gathered at Arafat after prayers.

== Life and career ==
In 1972, he graduated with a Bachelor of Laws degree from the Imam Muhammad bin Saud Islamic University. In 1975, he received a master's degree in Islamic law from Al-Azhar University, and then he took his doctorate from the same university.

In 1979, he became an imam of Al-Masjid al-Nabawi. In 1981, during the month of Ramadan, he was appointed as imam for the Tarawih prayers in Masjid al-Haram and then he went back to the Great Mosque of Medina where he continues to lead prayers.

He briefly served as an imam and Khateeb of Quba Mosque in 1987.

He was also appointed as Imam for Taraweeh prayers in Masjid al Haram from 1985-1986 and again from 1988-1991.
