= Salah Al Budair =

Imam at Masjid al-Nabawi

Salah bin Muhammad Al-Budair
- صلاح بن محمد البدير
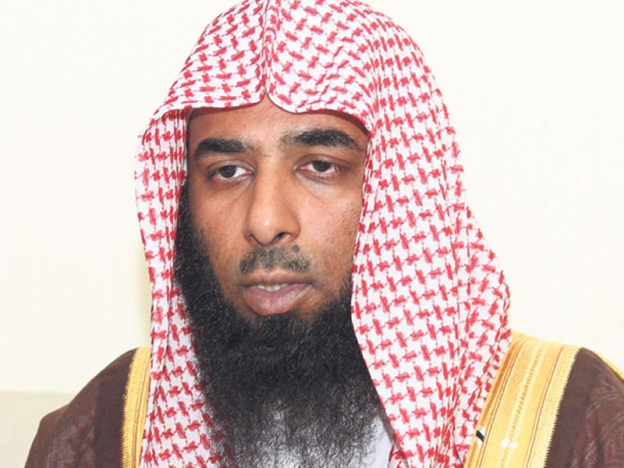

Imam and Khatib at Prophet's Mosque
- Incumbent
- Assumed office 1998

Guest Imam at Masjid al-Haram
- In office 2005–2006
- Title: Sheikh, Imam, Khatib, Qari

Personal life
- Born: 7 January 1970 (age 56) Hofuf, Eastern Province, Saudi Arabia

Religious life
- Religion: Islam

Salah Al-Budair (Arabic: صلاح البدير) is a Saudi imam of the Prophet's Mosque and Judge of the High Court of Medina. He led Tarawih prayers in Masjid al-Haram from 2005 to 2006. Sheikh Budair is appointed to perform Tarawih and Tahajjud on the 29th Ramadan of every year in Masjid al-Nabawi.

== Early life ==
He was born in 1970, in Hofuf, Eastern Province, belonging to the Banu Tamim tribe.

== Education ==
Salah Al-Budair was first appointed as an imam in Dammam, then in Riyadh, before assuming office at the Prophet’s Mosque in Medina.

He continued his studies of Sharia at Imam Mohammad Ibn Saud Islamic University in the Higher Institute of Judiciary in Riyadh, where he obtained a master's degree in comparative jurisprudence and graduated as a judge in 1994.

In March 2023, he obtained a Ph.D. from the Department of Islamic Studies at King Faisal University in Fiqh. The title of his thesis was "Facilitation of the Meanings of the Great Compilation by Ali bin Khalil bin Ali al-Damashqi al-Hanafi" (التيسير لمعاني الجامع الكبير لعلي بن خليل بن علي الدمشقي الحنفي).

== Works ==
His most famous work is a book on Tawhid (Islamic monotheism) entitled "Attaining Happiness from the Evidences of the Oneness of Worship" (بلوغ السعادة من أدلة توحيد العبادة), which includes approximately 1186 hadiths.

He has delivered sermons, lectures, and educational courses both within and outside Saudi Arabia.

== Visits ==
In 2025, in a visit to the Maldives, he led the Friday prayer in the Islamic Centre as part of a program organised by the Ministry of Islamic Affairs, Dawah and Guidance to promote global cultural and religious communication.
