= List of British Muslim politicians =

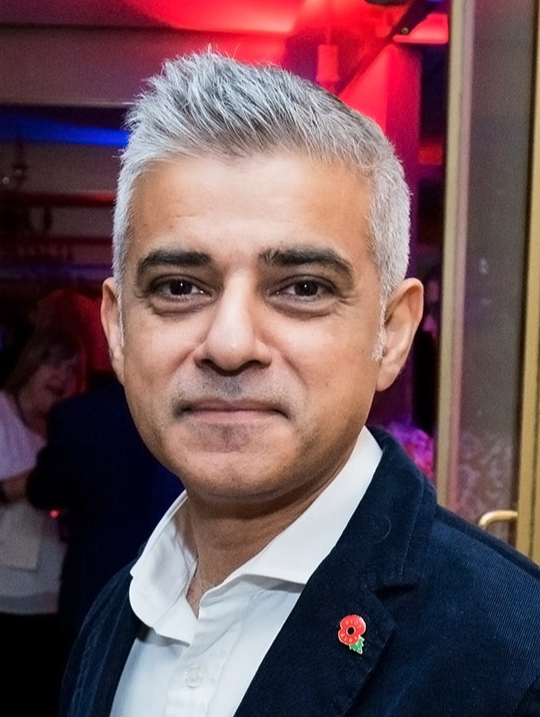
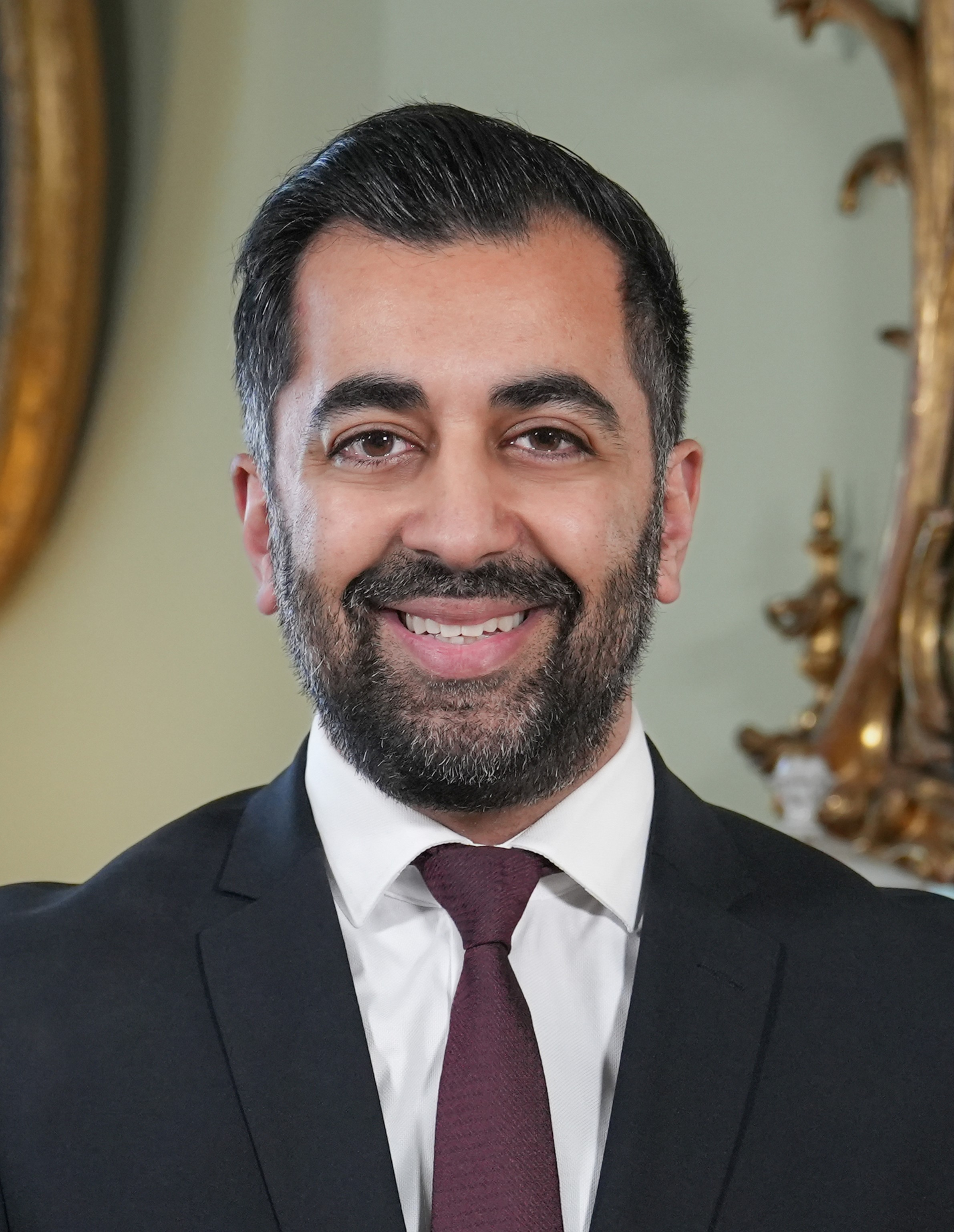
- Left: Sadiq Khan serving as Mayor of London from 2016.
- Right: Humza Yousaf served as First Minister of Scotland from 2023 to 2024.

List of British Muslim politicians:

== House of Commons ==
=== Members of the Cabinet in the House of Commons ===
Party	Portrait	Name	Constituency	First office held	Year appointed	Ethnicity
Conservative		Sajid Javid	Bromsgrove	Secretary of State for Culture, Media and Sport	2013	British Pakistani
Labour		Shabana Mahmood	Birmingham Ladywood	Secretary of State for Justice Lord Chancellor	2024	British Pakistani

=== Ministers in the House of Commons ===
Party	Portrait	Name	Constituency	First office held	Year appointed	Ethnicity
Labour		Shahid Malik	Dewsbury	Parliamentary Under-Secretary of State for International Development	2007	British Pakistani
Labour		Sadiq Khan	Tooting	Parliamentary Under-Secretary of State for Communities and Local Government	2008	British Pakistani
Conservative		Sajid Javid	Bromsgrove	Economic Secretary to the Treasury	2012	British Pakistani
Conservative		Nus Ghani	Wealden	Parliamentary Under-Secretary of State for Aviation and Maritime	2018	British Pakistani
Conservative		Rehman Chishti	Gillingham and Rainham	Parliamentary Under-Secretary of State for North America, Sanctions and Consular Policy	2022	British Pakistani
Conservative		Saqib Bhatti	Meriden	Parliamentary Under-Secretary of State for Tech and the Digital Economy	2023	British Pakistani
Labour		Rushanara Ali	Bethnal Green and Stepney	Parliamentary Under-Secretary of State for Housing, Communities and Local Government	2024	British Bangladeshi
Labour		Feryal Clark	Enfield North	Parliamentary Under-Secretary of State for Science, Innovation and Technology	2024	British Kurdish
Labour		Tulip Siddiq	Hampstead and Highgate	Economic Secretary to the Treasury	2024	British Bangladeshi

=== Members of Parliament ===
Party	Portrait	Name	Constituency	Year elected	Year left	Reason for tenure ending	Ethnicity
Labour		Mohammad Sarwar	Glasgow Central	1997	2010	Retired	British Pakistani
Labour		Khalid Mahmood	Birmingham Perry Barr	2001	2024	Defeated	British Pakistani
Labour		Sadiq Khan	Tooting	2005	2016	Resigned to become Mayor of London	British Pakistani
Labour		Shahid Malik	Dewsbury	2005	2010	Defeated	British Pakistani
Labour		Rushanara Ali	Bethnal Green and Bow & Bethnal Green and Stepney	2010		Serving	British Bangladeshi
Conservative		Rehman Chishti	Gillingham and Rainham	2010	2024	Defeated	British Pakistani
Conservative		Sajid Javid	Bromsgrove	2010	2024	Retired	British Pakistani
Labour		Shabana Mahmood	Birmingham Ladywood	2010		Serving	British Pakistani
Labour		Yasmin Qureshi	Bolton South East & Bolton South and Walkden	2010		Serving	British Pakistani
Labour		Anas Sarwar	Glasgow Central	2010	2015	Defeated	British Pakistani
Conservative		Nus Ghani	Wealden & Sussex Weald	2015		Serving	British Pakistani
Labour		Imran Hussain	Bradford East	2015		Serving	British Pakistani
Labour		Rupa Huq	Ealing Central and Acton	2015		Serving	British Bangladeshi
Labour		Naz Shah	Bradford West	2015		Serving	British Pakistani
SNP		Tasmina Ahmed-Sheikh	Ochil and South Perthshire	2015	2017	Defeated	British Pakistani/White British/Other White (Mixed)
Labour		Tulip Siddiq	Hampstead and Kilburn & Hampstead and Highgate	2015		Serving	British Bangladeshi
Labour		Rosena Allin-Khan	Tooting	2016		Serving	British Pakistani/Other White (Mixed)
Labour		Afzal Khan	Manchester Gorton & Manchester Rusholme	2017		Serving	British Pakistani
Labour		Faisal Rashid	Warrington South	2017	2019	Defeated	British Pakistani
Labour		Mohammad Yasin	Bedford	2017		Serving	British Pakistani
Conservative		Imran Ahmad Khan	Wakefield	2019	2021	Suspended and later expelled from Conservatives, became an independent	British Pakistani/White British (Mixed)
Independent		Imran Ahmad Khan	Wakefield	2021	2022	Resigned	British Pakistani/White British (Mixed)
Labour		Tahir Ali	Birmingham Hall Green & Hall Green and Moseley	2019		Serving	British Pakistani
Labour		Apsana Begum	Poplar and Limehouse	2019		Serving	British Bangladeshi
Conservative		Saqib Bhatti	Meriden & Meriden and Solihull East	2019		Serving	British Pakistani
Labour		Feryal Clark	Enfield North	2019		Serving	British Turkish (Kurdish)
Labour		Zarah Sultana	Coventry South	2019		Serving	British Pakistani
SNP		Anum Qaisar	Airdrie and Shotts	2021	2024	Defeated	British Pakistani
Labour		Nesil Caliskan	Barking	2024		Serving	British Cypriot (Turkish)
Independent		Shockat Adam	Leicester South	2024		Serving	British Indian
Labour		Zubir Ahmed	Glasgow South West	2024		Serving	British Pakistani
Labour		Sadik Al-Hassan	North Somerset	2024		Serving	British Arab
Independent		Adnan Hussain	Blackburn	2024		Serving	British Pakistani
Labour		Adam Jogee	Newcastle-under-Lyme	2024		Serving	Black British/White British (Mixed)
Independent		Ayoub Khan	Birmingham Perry Barr	2024		Serving	British Pakistani
Labour		Naushabah Khan	Gillingham and Rainham	2024		Serving	British Pakistani
Labour		Abtisam Mohamed	Sheffield Central	2024		Serving	British Yemeni
Independent		Iqbal Mohamed	Dewsbury and Batley	2024		Serving	British Indian

== House of Lords ==
=== Members of the Cabinet in the House of Lords ===
Party	Portrait	Name	First office held	Year appointed	Ethnicity
Conservative		Sayeeda Warsi, Baroness Warsi	Minister without Portfolio (attending Cabinet)	2010	British Pakistani

=== Ministers in the House of Lords ===
Party	Portrait	Name	First office held	Year appointed	Ethnicity
Conservative		Nosheena Mobarik, Baroness Mobarik	Baroness-in-waiting	2016	British Pakistani
Conservative		Zahida Manzoor, Baroness Manzoor	Baroness-in-waiting	2018	British Pakistani
Conservative		Syed Kamall, Baron Kamall	Parliamentary Under-Secretary of State for Technology, Innovation and Life Sciences	2021	British Indian
Labour		Wajid Khan, Baron Khan of Burnley	Parliamentary Under-Secretary of State at the Ministry of Housing, Communities and Local Government	2024	British Pakistani

=== Members of the House of Lords ===
Party	Portraitl	Name	Year entered	Year left	Reason for tenure ending	Ethnicity
Crossbench		Henry Stanley, 3rd Baron Stanley of Alderley	1869	1903	Died	White British
Labour		Waheed Alli, Baron Alli	1998		Serving	British Pakistani
Labour		Pola Uddin, Baroness Uddin	1998	2010 (Crossed the floor)	Resigned from the Labour Party, now a Crossbencher	British Bangladeshi
Crossbench		Pola Uddin, Baroness Uddin	2010		Serving	British Bangladeshi
Labour		Nazir Ahmed, Baron Ahmed	1998	2007 (Crossed the floor)	Expelled from the Labour Party, became a Crossbencher	British Pakistani
Crossbench		Nazir Ahmed, Baron Ahmed	2007	2020	Resigned under threat of expulsion	British Pakistani
Labour		Adam Patel, Baron Patel of Blackburn	2000	2019	Died	British Indian
Labour		Amir Bhatia, Baron Bhatia	2001	2010 (Crossed the floor)	Resigned from the Labour Party, now a Crossbencher	British Indian
Crossbench		Amir Bhatia, Baron Bhatia	2010	2023	Removed	British Indian
Liberal Democrats		Kishwer Falkner, Baroness Falkner of Margravine	2004	2019 (Crossed the floor)	Resigned from the Liberal Democrats, now a Crossbencher	British Pakistani
Crossbench		Kishwer Falkner, Baroness Falkner of Margravine	2019		Serving	British Pakistani
Conservative		Mohamed Sheikh, Baron Sheikh	2006	2022	Died	British Indian
Crossbench		Khalid Hameed, Baron Hameed	2007		Serving	British Indian
Conservative		Sayeeda Warsi, Baroness Warsi	2007		Serving	British Pakistani
Crossbench		Haleh Afshar, Baroness Afshar	2007	2022	Died	British Iranian
Liberal Democrats		Meral Hussein-Ece, Baroness Hussein-Ece	2010		Serving	British Turkish
Conservative		Tariq Ahmad, Baron Ahmad of Wimbledon	2011		Serving	British Pakistani
Liberal Democrats		Qurban Hussain, Baron Hussain	2011		Serving	British Pakistani
Labour		Gulam Noon, Baron Noon	2011	2015	Died	British Indian
Liberal Democrats		Zahida Manzoor, Baroness Manzoor	2013	2016 (Crossed the floor)	Resigned from the Liberal Democrats, now a Conservative	British Pakistani
Conservative		Zahida Manzoor, Baroness Manzoor	2016		Serving	British Pakistani
Conservative		Arminka Helic, Baroness Helic	2014		Serving	British Bosnian
Conservative		Nosheena Mobarik, Baroness Mobarik	2014		Serving	British Pakistani
Liberal Democrats		Shas Sheehan, Baroness Sheehan	2015		Serving	British Pakistani
Conservative		Zameer Choudrey, Baron Choudrey	2019		Serving	British Pakistani
Crossbench		Minouche Shafik, Baroness Shafik	2020		Serving	British Egyptian
Conservative		Aamer Sarfraz, Baron Sarfraz	2020		Serving	British Pakistani
Conservative		Syed Kamall, Baron Kamall	2021		Serving	British Indian
Labour		Wajid Khan, Baron Khan of Burnley	2021		Serving	British Pakistani
Crossbench		Shaista Gohir, Baroness Gohir	2022		Serving	British Pakistani
Labour		Ayesha Hazarika, Baroness Hazarika	2024		Serving	British Indian

== Scottish Parliament ==
=== First Ministers of Scotland ===
Party	Portrait	Name	Constituency	First office held	Year appointed	Ethnicity
SNP		Humza Yousaf	Glasgow	First Minister of Scotland	2023	British Pakistani

=== Members of the Scottish Cabinet in the Scottish Parliament ===
Party	Portrait	Name	Constituency	First office held	Year appointed	Ethnicity
SNP		Humza Yousaf	Glasgow	Cabinet Secretary for Justice	2018	British Pakistani

=== Scottish Government Junior Ministers in the Scottish Parliament ===
Party	Portrait	Name	Constituency	First office held	Year appointed	Ethnicity
SNP		Humza Yousaf	Glasgow	Minister for External Affairs and International Development	2012	British Pakistani
SNP		Kaukab Stewart	Glasgow Kelvin	Minister for Culture, Europe and International Development	2024	British Pakistani

=== Members of the Scottish Parliament ===
Party	Portrait	Name	Constituency	Year elected	Year left	Reason for tenure ending	Ethnicity
SNP		Bashir Ahmad	Glasgow	2007	2009	Died in office	British Pakistani
Labour		Hanzala Malik	Glasgow	2011	2016	Defeated	British Pakistani/White British (Mixed)
SNP		Humza Yousaf	Glasgow	2011	2026	Retired	British Pakistani
Labour		Anas Sarwar	Glasgow	2016	2026	Resigned to join the Burnham ministry and the House of Lords	British Pakistani
Labour		Foysol Choudhury	Lothian	2021		Serving	British Bangladeshi
SNP		Kaukab Stewart	Glasgow	2021		Serving	British Pakistani

== Senedd ==
=== Members of the Senedd ===
Party	Portrait	Name	Constituency	Year elected	Year left	Reason for tenure ending	Ethnicity
Plaid Cymru		Mohammad Asghar	South Wales East	2007	2009 (Crossed the floor in 2009)	Left Plaid Cymru, joined Conservative Party	British Pakistani
Conservative		Mohammad Asghar	South Wales East	2009	2020	Died in office	British Pakistani
Conservative		Altaf Hussain	South Wales West	2015	2016	Defeated	British Indian
Conservative		Altaf Hussain	South Wales West	2021		Serving	British Indian
Conservative		Natasha Asghar	South Wales East	2021		Serving	British Pakistani

== Greater London Authority ==
=== Mayors of London ===
Party	Portrait	Name	Constituency	Year elected	Year left	Reason for tenure ending	Ethnicity
Labour		Sadiq Khan	Mayor of London	2016		Serving	British Pakistani

=== London Assembly ===
==== London Assembly Members ====
Party	Portrait	Name	Constituency	Year elected	Year left	Reason for tenure ending	Ethnicity
Labour		Murad Qureshi	Additional member	2004	2016	Defeated	British Bangladeshi
Labour		Marina Ahmad	Lambeth and Southwark	2021		Serving	British Bangladeshi
Liberal Democrats		Hina Bokhari	Additional member	2021		Serving	British Pakistani
Labour		Sakina Sheikh	Additional member	2021	2024	Defeated	British Pakistani

== Local authorities ==
Party	Portrait	Name	Ward	Borough	Year elected	Year left	Reason for tenure ending	Ethnicity
Labour Party		Rizwan Jalil	Oldbury	Sandwell Metropolitan Borough Council	2021		Serving	British Pakistani

=== Directly elected mayors ===
Party	Portrait	Name	Constituency	Year elected	Year left	Reason for tenure ending	Ethnicity
Independent		Lutfur Rahman	Mayor of Tower Hamlets	2010	2014 (Crossed the floor in 2014)	Created Tower Hamlets First	British Bangladeshi
Tower Hamlets First		Lutfur Rahman	Mayor of Tower Hamlets	2014	2015	Election court found corrupt or illegal practices and removed from office	British Bangladeshi
Aspire		Lutfur Rahman	Mayor of Tower Hamlets	2022		Serving	British Bangladeshi
Labour		Rokhsana Fiaz	Mayor of Newham	2018		Serving	British Pakistani
