= American Conservation Film Festival =

Annual film festival (2003-)

- Location: Shepherdstown, West Virginia
- Founded: 2003
- Website: https://conservationfilmfest.org/

The American Conservation Film Festival (ACFF) is an annual film festival established in 2003 and based in Shepherdstown, West Virginia. Its stated mission is to present "conservation-focused films and programs that engage, inform, and inspire". Its current director is Hilary Lo.
