= Sheikh Muhammad Nuru Khalid =

Nigerian Islamic cleric

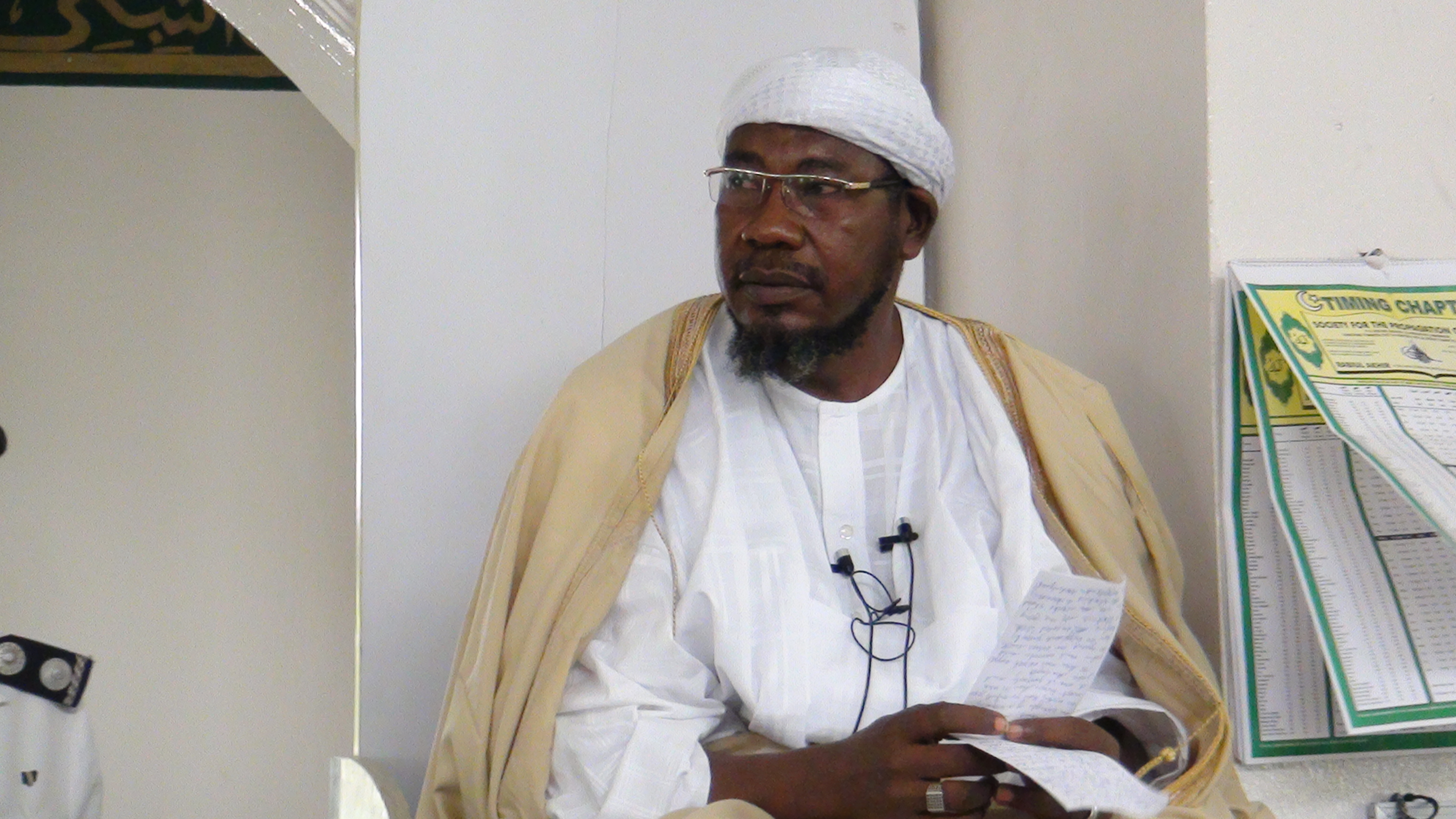
- Sheikh Muhammad Nuru Khalid
- Born: 1 October 1960 (age 65); Nigeria
- Occupations: Islamic Scholar. Imam. Public speaker

Sheikh Muhammad Nuru Khalid (born October 1, 1960 in Jos Plateau State ) is a Nigerian Islamic cleric, and was the Chief Imam of Apo Legislative Quarters Juma'at Mosque in Federal Capital Territory before his suspension on 2 April 2022 by the mosque's committee, following his criticism of APC government over the state of insecurity in the country. He was the founder of Islamic Research and Da’awah Foundation IRDF and a leader of FCT Imam delegation 2014.

== Early life and education ==
Nuru Khalid was born on 1 October 1960 in Jos Plateau State. He was brought up in a Middle Class Family, his father is an Islamic scholar. Before he went to Primary School He was taught by his father how to read and write Arabic. At the age of six, he memorized The Quran with some Arabic Poems. He attended LA Primary school which is now LGE Primary School in Jos Plateau State. After the death of his father and the background he has. He did not attend a Public Secondary School. But his mother supported him to join the School of Higher Islamic Studies of the Jamatul Izalatul Bidia Wa Ikhamatul Sunnah popularly called Izala. After his graduation he went and studied Islamic Studies in University of Jos.

== Early career ==
In his youth age, while studying in University Of Jos he worked as a teacher in School of Higher Islamic Studies in Jos. He became an Imam of Jumu'at Mosque at Congo Junction in Jos. He was appointed as an imam of Jumu'ah at Nyanya Jumuat Mosque in Abuja. In 2007 he was appointed Chief Imam of Apo Legislative Quarters Juma'at Mosque in Abuja. Because the Mosque is influential he became a Public Speaker, addressing over 5,000 People in his Friday Congregational Prayer Khutbah and his annual Ramadan Digital Tafseer which is aired on Television, Radio stations and internet live stream broadcasting with viewers in Nigeria and across the world. He was the founder of Islamic Research Da'awah Foundation IRDF.

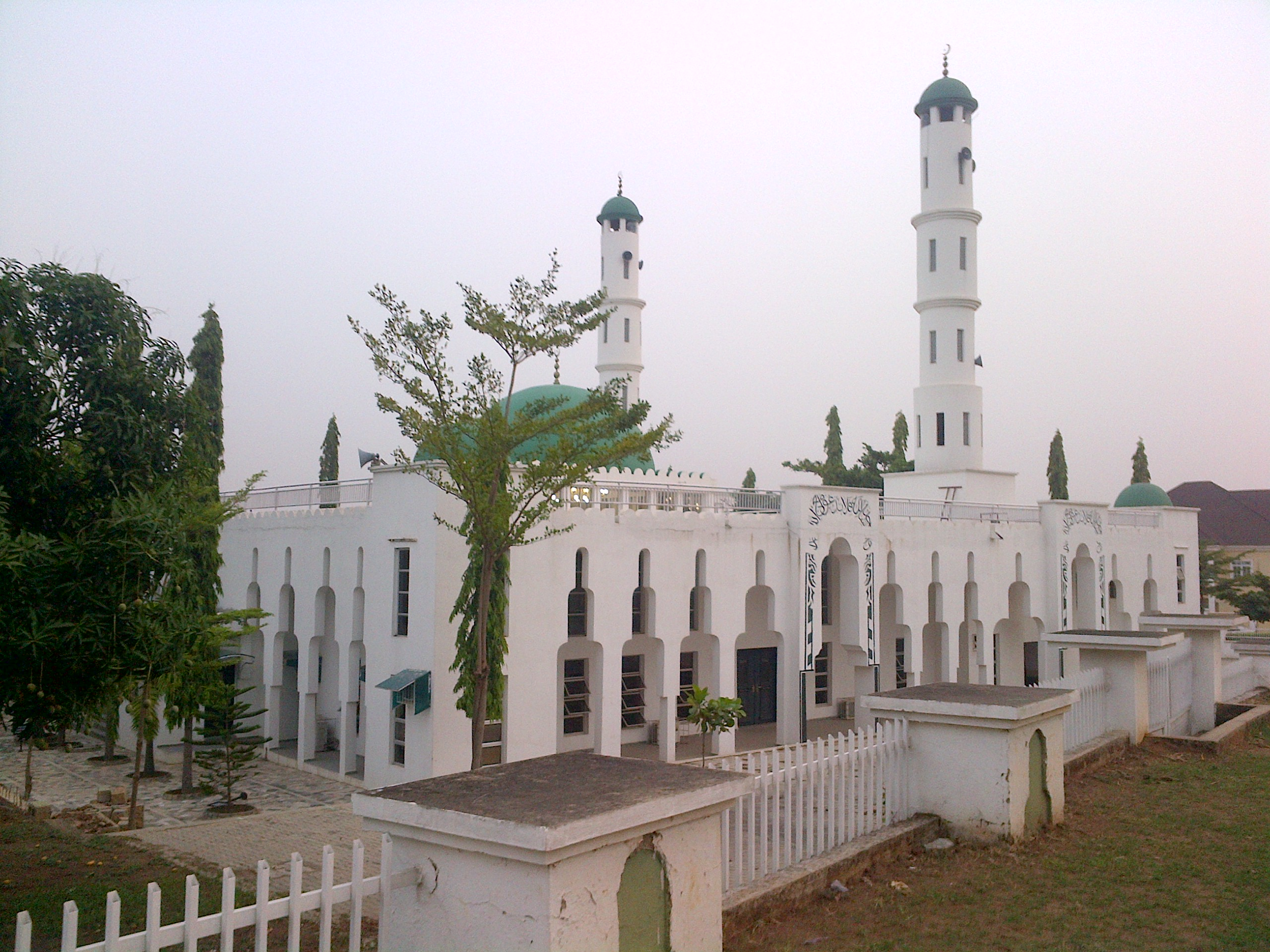
Apo legislative Quarters Juma'at Mosque

== Anti Gay Legislation ==
He commended the Nigerian Legislation and the President for refusing to legalize the gay marriage in the Country, which he said is against the teaching of Islam and Christianity and also against the norms and value of the Nigerian people. He pointed out that same sex marriage will destroy the natural Reproduction system. He hails Nigerian Government for prohibition of gay marriage and advised them to keep working together on issues in peace, unity and understanding.

== Delegation ==
In 2014 Nyanya Bomb blast he led the delegation of FCT Imams to Hospitals and donated relief materials to the victims on behalf of Muslim Community in Abuja and he condemned the incident.

“We thank Almighty Allah for sparing the lives of those who are alive; we encourage them to be steadfast in their faith. Abuja Muslim Community is not happy with this incident, we pray that God will expose all those who participated in such evil act and that justice will prevail. We are all one in Nigeria, be it Christian or Muslim, and we also appreciate the Federal Government for looking into the situation”

== Insurgency and Terrorism ==
Sheikh Khalid condemned terrorism and insurgency of islamic fundamentalism. He stated that unemployment and corruption are the major causes of insecurity in Nigeria and called the Government to increase job opportunities for the youth.

== Personal life ==
Sheikh Muhammad Nura Khalid is a family man.

== See also ==
- Islam in Nigeria
- Abubakar Gumi
- Ja'afar Mahmud Adam
- Izala
