= Lisa Urkevich =

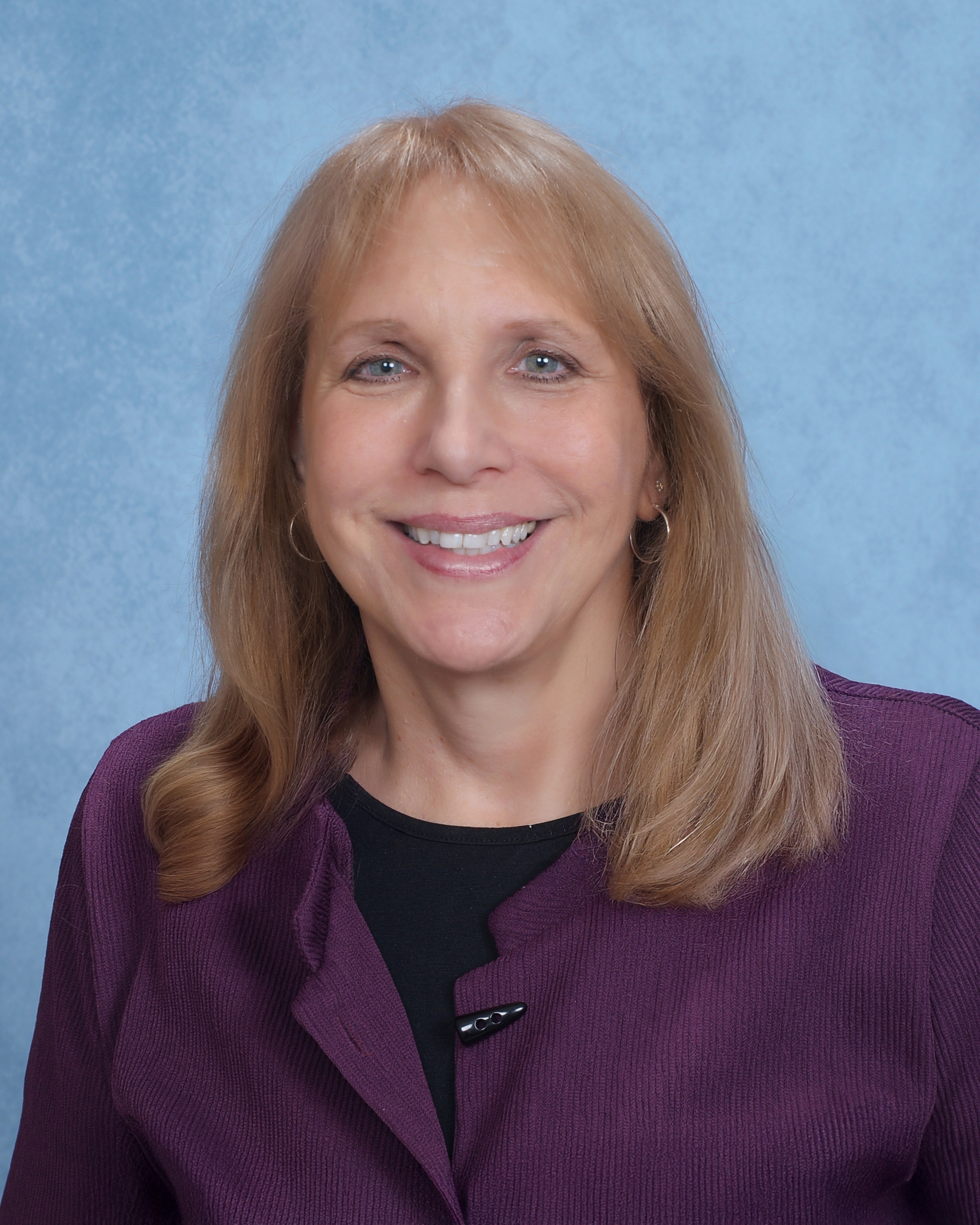
Dr. Lisa Urkevich

Dr. Lisa Urkevich is an executive leader, cultural strategist, and scholar specializing in the heritage, music, and traditions of Saudi Arabia, Kuwait, and the greater Arabian Peninsula and Gulf States. She has also undertaken significant scholarship on Northern European Renaissance music. She is a Georgetown University Fellow, and has advised governments, cultural authorities, and major development initiatives. She has led the establishment of research, educational, and public institutions, including serving as founding director of two regional heritage centers.

Urkevich holds the rank of full professor of musicology and ethnomusicology and was the inaugural Head of the College of Arts and Humanities and Chair of the Music and Drama Department at the American University of Kuwait. Previously, she was a full-time professor at Boston University. Since 2017 she has been the General Editor of Symposium: Journal of the College Music Society, the largest consortium of college, conservatory, university, and independent musicians and scholars. Urkevich is a former Harvard University Fellow, a two-time Senior Fulbright Scholar, recipient of the University of Maryland Alumna of the Year Award, and the author of numerous publications including the "pioneering work," Music and Traditions of the Arabian Peninsula: Saudi Arabia, Kuwait, Bahrain, and Qatar (Routledge, 2015).

== Education ==
Urkevich holds four degrees: PhD from the University of Maryland, Master of Music from Florida State University, Bachelor of Science from Towson University, and a Bachelor of Arts from the University of Maryland, Baltimore County--under the direction of Mantle Hood, a founder of the field of ethnomusicology.

== Career ==
Urkevich has served in several senior academic, advisory, and institution-building roles. She was the founding director of two heritage centers: the Tariq Abdulhakim Center (with museum) in Jeddah, and the Arabian Heritage Project in Kuwait, which she directed for seven years. Her work includes developing strategies, research, archives, exhibits, performances, programs, and initiatives to safeguard and promote intangible heritage.

She is a Georgetown University Fellow, and was previously a visiting fellow at Harvard University. She was twice appointed a Senior Fulbright Scholar, and was named Alumna of the Year by the University of Maryland.

As a full-time professor at Boston University, she held a joint faculty position in the College of Fine Arts, the College of Arts and Sciences, and the Graduate School of Arts and Sciences. Urkevich also has been a visiting professor at Bucknell University, the University of Maryland, and Millersville University. She moved to Kuwait in 2003 as a United States Senior Fulbright Scholar, after which she was invited to help lead the newly opened American University of Kuwait. She served as the first Head of the College of Arts and Humanities and played a pivotal role in launching the new university, including establishing the Department of Music and Drama, the first of its kind in a liberal arts institution in the Arabian Peninsula.

Throughout her career, Urkevich has advised governments, corporations, institutions, and development initiatives on cultural policy, strategic planning, education, heritage, and performing arts. She remains active in think tanks, scholarly and professional organizations, and international conferences, and is an alumna of the Aspen Institute Executive Seminar.

== Research and scholarship ==
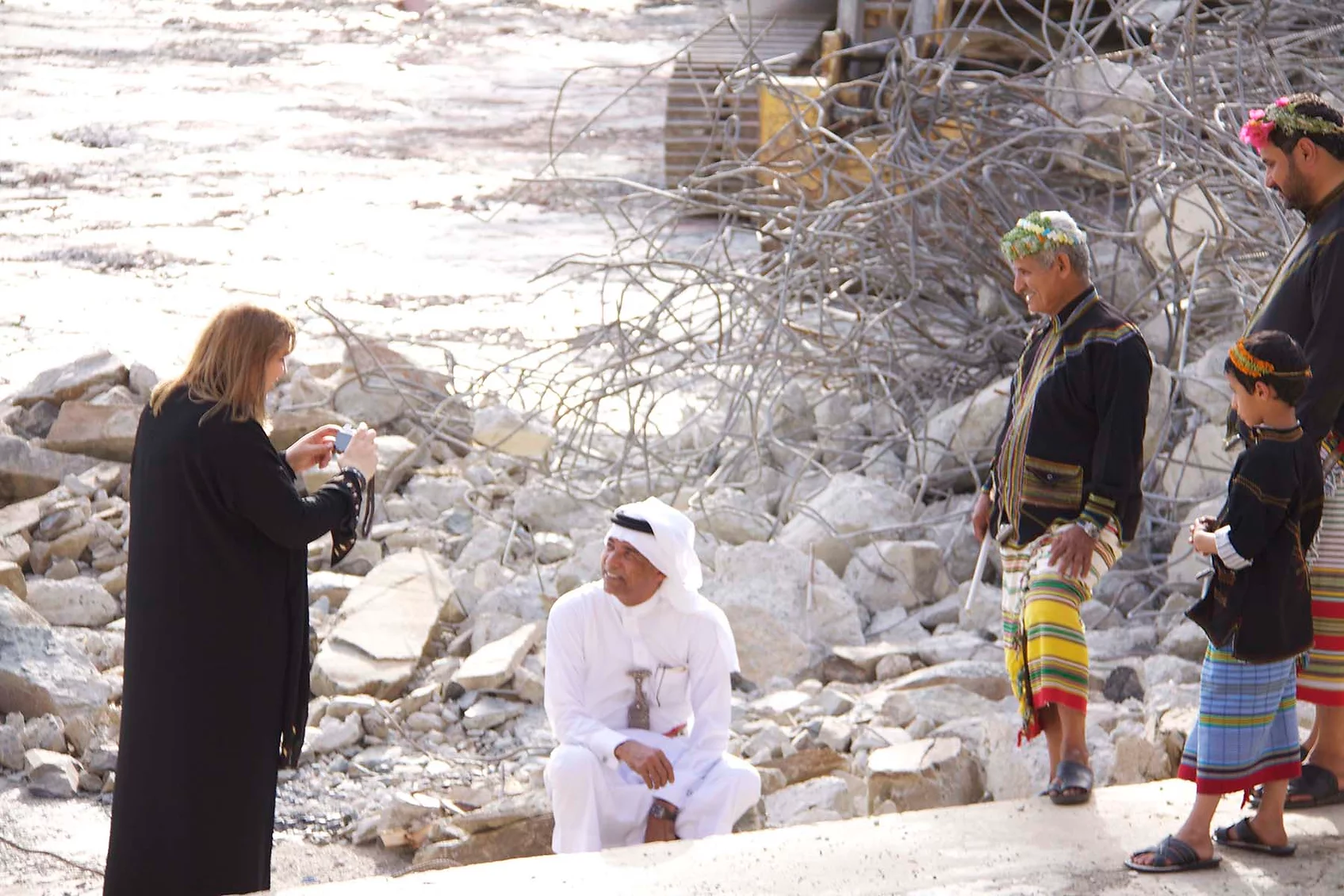
Urkevich discussing regional performing arts with locals in southwest Saudi Arabia

For over 30 years Urkevich has conducted research and fieldwork throughout the Arabian Peninsula. From 1994 to 1998 she lived in several regions of Saudi Arabia during a time when the country was widely regarded as one of the most socially restrictive in the world and many viewed music as haraam, or religiously impermissible. Women were not permitted to drive, their activities and mobility were heavily restricted, and travel required the escort of a male "guardian." Such adversity made music research challenging.

Despite the constraints, Urkevich conducted fieldwork across thousands of kilometers, documenting traditions of diverse communities throughout the Saudi Kingdom and Gulf States. Her investigation covers both men and women, the privileged and disadvantaged, badu and hadhar (Bedouin and settled), peoples of the mountains, villages, deserts, and cities. Her work has concerned musical traditions that are undergoing rapid change or are at risk of disappearing.

Drawing on this research, she has published scholarship and developed unique courses on Arabian Peninsula heritage and music. She has regularly taught and lectured on Arab music and culture, along with Western music.

Among her publications, Urkevich is the author of Kuwait: Sea Songs of the Arabian Gulf, "a rigorous work and valuable contribution," and Music and Traditions of the Arabian Peninsula, "the most comprehensive [music] book anywhere in the Middle East and North Africa."

RENAISSANCE MUSIC

Urkevich is also well known for her work on Renaissance music. For four years she was the director of the Boston University Collegium Musicum Early Music Ensemble, and the group performed her transcriptions of the Anne Boleyn Music Book, perhaps the first performance of the pieces in over 500 years. As a musicologist, she debunked the hypothesis, presented by Edward Lowinsky, that the so-called Anne Boleyn Music Book MS 1070 of the Royal College of Music] was prepared in England in the 1530s for Boleyn [Lowinsky, "A Music Book for Anne Boleyn," in Florilegium historiale, 1971]. Urkevich's research asserts that Boleyn owned the book and likely performed from it, but that it was not commissioned for her and instead was given to her while she was a girl in France.

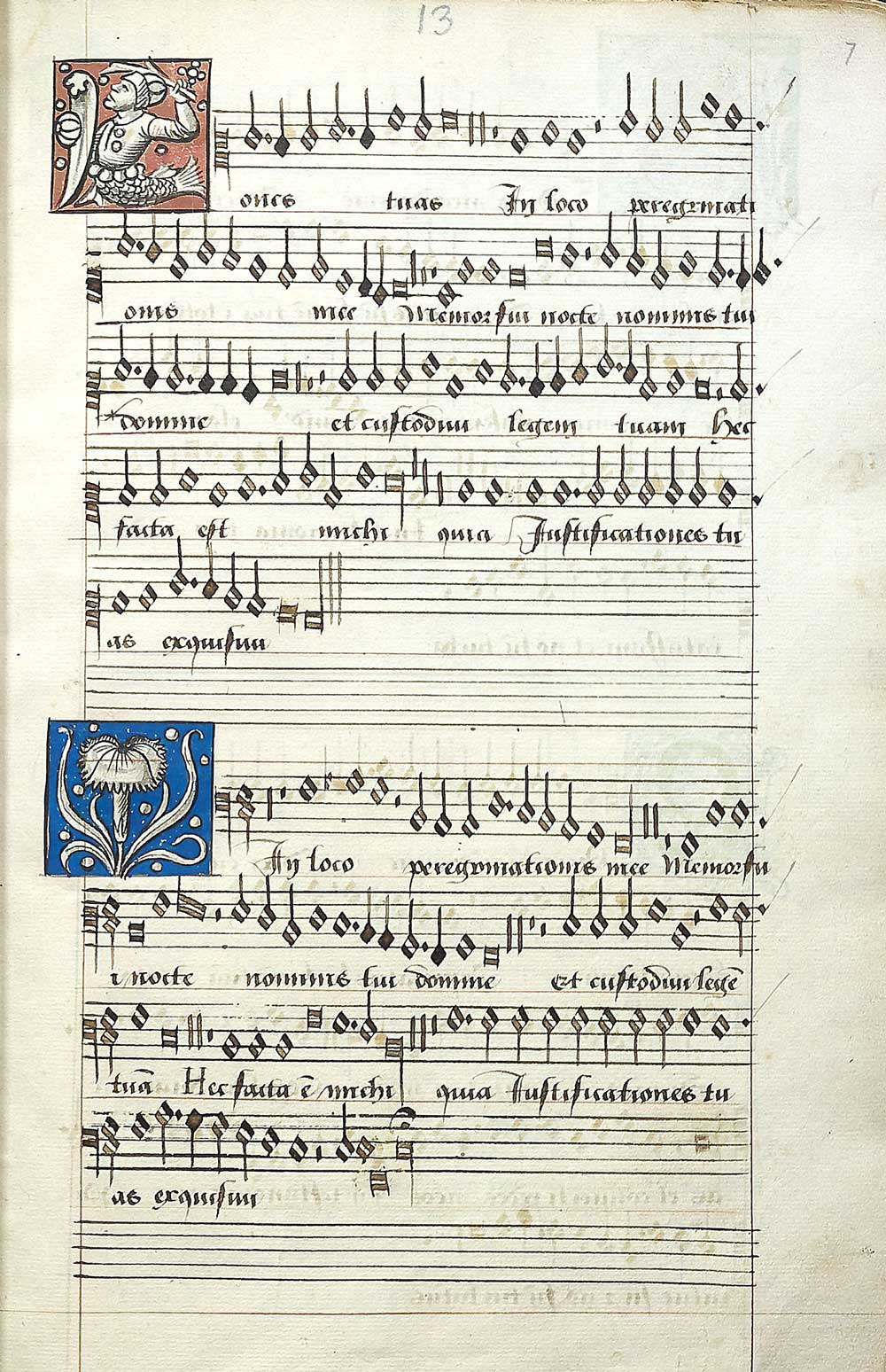
Page 13, MS 1070, RCM, a Renaissance motet book that Urkevich contends was given to Anne Boleyn while she was a girl in France. The complex polyphonic sacred music it contains was ordinarily performed by professional male musicians in religious settings. Urkevich demonstrates that the music book was owned and performed by amateur women and girls, revealing a previously unrecognized high level of skill among women at certain royal courts.

"Urkevich presents a compelling narrative (and in many ways more interesting than Lowinsky's) that proposes, on paleographical and reportorial evidence, that the motet book was prepared in France ca. 1505–09, and was owned and prepared for a woman, possibly Marguerite d'Angoulême (sister of Francis I), or her mother, Louise of Savoy, and given to Anne, while she was in their service in France as a young girl. ...Urkevich's dating of the manuscript is convincing. [On her suggested provenance]...I find the many connections intriguing...."

Urkevich also re-established the provenance of the important music manuscript London, British Library, Ms. Royal 20 A. XVI, proving that it was prepared for Anne de Beaujeu (Anne of France) and her husband Pierre de Bourbon around 1488 when they gained their positions as duke and duchess of Bourbon—and was not prepared for Louis d'Orléans and Anne of Brittany as was previously purported.

== Selected publications ==
- Music and Traditions of the Arabian Peninsula: Saudi Arabia, Kuwait, Bahrain, and Qatar. New York/London: Routledge, 2015 ISBN 9780415888721
- Kuwait: Sea Songs of the Arabian Gulf: Hamid Bin Hussein Sea Band. CD and Booklet issued separately. MCM 3051. Barre, VT: Multicultural Media, 2014 ISBN 978-0-9904737-4-9
- "Anne Boleyn's French Motet Book: A Childhood Gift," in Ars musica septentrionalis. Eds. Frédéric Billiet and Barbara Haggh. Paris: Presses de l'université Paris-Sorbonne (PUPS), 95–120, 2011.
- "The Wings of the Bourbon: The Early Provenance of the Chansonnier London, British Library, Ms. Royal 20 A. XVI," Journal of the Alamire Foundation Vol. 4/1 (2012): 91-113.
