= Farida El Choubachy =

Egyptian journalist

- Born: Farida
- Citizenship: Egypt
- Occupations: Journalist, political writer
- Employer: Nile News Channel
- Notable work: member of the Parliament of Egypt

Farida El Choubachy (also transliterated as Fariday al-Shoubashy) is a member of the Parliament of Egypt, journalist and political writer.

In 2021, at the age of 83, she was the first woman in 42 years to address the opening session of Parliament.

As a journalist, she worked as the host of the Nile News Channel current affairs show Wanted for Comments and a newspaper columnist.

== Religion ==
Born Christian but a convert to Islam, she was very critical of the Muslim Brotherhood. During their rule after the death of Hosni Mubarak, El Choubachy said "In this era, there is no room for anyone saying that women are less or cannot enter political life or that their voices should not be heard."
