= Azerbaijani Culture Friends Foundation =

Azerbaijani charity foundation

Azerbaijani Culture Friends Foundation (ACFF) - is a charity foundation of Azerbaijan. The foundation is non-governmental.

== History ==
Azerbaijani Culture Friends Foundation was founded in 1995. Mehriban Aliyeva, goodwill ambassador of UNESCO and ISESCO, and Member of Parliament, is the chairperson of the foundation.

== The object of the foundation ==
The foundation's object is to popularize and publicize the national culture, introduce the culture to foreign countries, integrate Azerbaijani people into the global culture, and make new international relations. The work of the Foundation is divided into 3 sectors: cultural events, charity actions, and publication.

== Activity ==
Organizing jubilee nights for famous art figures of Azerbaijan, publish several magazine and CDs for art of Azerbaijan. Foundation organizes concerts, theater performances, presentations. Among the famous events that foundation held is "Great Silk Road" International Classical Music Festival and Days of Korean Culture held together with SEBA (Seoul-Baku) Azerbaijan-Korean Cultural Exchange Association. The main objective of the foundation is to popularize Azerbaijan Mugham on the world-scale. "Baku Mugham Center" was founded as a step in this direction. The music album "Karabakh khanendeleri", "Baku Fall" international festival IX East-West International Film Festival in Baku, "Advertisement Greedy Night" are also held within the framework of the foundation's activity plan.
