= List of contemporary Islamic scholars =

Modern-era (20th to 21st century) Islamic scholars include the following, referring to religious authorities whose publications or statements are accepted as pronouncements on religion by their respective communities and adherents.

Geographical categories have been created based on commonalities in culture and across the Islamic World.

== Africa ==
=== Algeria ===
- Abdel-Hamid ibn Badis (1889–1940)
- Abdul Baqi Miftah (born 1952)
- Abu Bakr al-Jazaeri (1921–2018)
- Brahim Boushaki (1912–1997)
- Mohamed Bachir El Ibrahimi (1889–1965)
- Muhammad al-'Arabi al-Tabbani (1897/1898-1970)
- Muhammad al-Hashimi al-Tilimsani (1881–1961)

=== Egypt ===
- Abd al-Hamid Kishk (1933–1996)
- Ahmad al-Tayyeb (born 1946)
- Ahmad Muhammad Shakir (1892–1958)
- Ali Gomaa (born 1952)
- Muhammad Metwalli al-Sha'rawi (1911–1998)
- Muhammad Sayyid Tantawy (1928–2010)
- Yusuf al-Qaradawi (1926–2022)
- Zainab al Ghazali (1917–2005)

=== Gambia ===
- Sheikh Musa Drammeh (born 1962)

=== Ghana ===
- Abdul Wahab Adam (1938–2014)
- Ahmad Bamba (1940–2022)
- Ibrahim Basha
- Osman Nuhu Sharubutu (born 1919 or 1923)
- Saeed Abubakr Zakaria
- Yusuf Soalih Ajura (1890–2004)

=== Libya ===
- Sadiq Al-Ghariani (born 1942)

=== Mali ===
- Chérif Ousmane Madani Haïdara
- Mahmoud Dicko (born c.1954)
- Hammad al Ansari (1925-1997)
- Shaykh Muhammad Shareef bin Farid (born 1959)

=== Mauritania ===
- Abdallah Bin Bayyah (born 1935)
- Mohammad Al-Hasan Al-Dido (born 1963)
- Mohamed Fadel Bin Mohamed El-Amin (Born, 19..)

=== Morocco ===
- Abd al-Aziz al-Ghumari (1920–1997)
- Abdullah al-Ghumari (1910–1993)
- Abu Chataa al-Jamaï (1904/1905–1990)
- Ahmad al-Ghumari (1902–1961)
- Asma Lamrabet (born 1951)
- Fatima al-Kabbaj (born 1932)
- Hassan Kettani (born 1972)
- Muhammad Abu Khubza (1932–2020)
- Muhammad Taqi-ud-Din al-Hilali (1893–1987)
- Allal al-Fassi (1910–1974)

=== Nigeria ===
- Shehu Uthman Dan Fodio (Born 1754) Sokoto Caliphate
- Dahiru Usman Bauchi (1927–2025)
- Adam Abdullah Al-Ilory (1917-1992)
- Ibrahim Ahmad Maqary (born 1976)
- Isa Ali Pantami
- Ja'afar Mahmud Adam (1960–2007)
- Kabir Ahmad Azare (1960–2023)
- Kabiru Gombe (born 1960)
- Muhammad Auwal Albani Zaria (1960–2014)
- Muyideen Ajani Bello (1940–2024)
- Nasiru Kabara
- Usman Idris Kusfa (1968 or 1969 - 2026)
- Sani Yahaya Jingir
- Sulaiman Muhammad Adam (born 1962)

=== Senegal ===
- Ibrahim Niass (1900–1975)
- Hassan Cisse (1945–2008)

=== Sierra Leone ===
- Ahmad Tejan Sillah
- Mohamed Sanusi Tejan (1950–2016)

=== Somalia ===
- Abdinasir Haji Ahmed (1957–2022)
- Abdulkadir Nur Farah (1940–2013)
- Ahmed Haji Abdirahman (1957–2011)
- Ali Dhere
- Ali Warsame (1939/1940-2022)
- Mohamoud Sheikh Dalmar
- Sheikh Omar Farouk (1939–2011)

=== South Africa ===
- Abdalqadir as-Sufi (1930–2021)
- Ahmed Deedat (1918 - 2005)
- Ebrahim Desai (1963–2021)
- Taha Karaan (1969–2021)
- Yusuf Karaan (1935–2015)
- Muhsin Hendricks (1967–2025)

=== Tunisia ===
- Mohamed Abdelaziz Djaït (1886–1970)
- Othman Battikh (1941–2022)

=== Uganda ===
- Muhammad Galabuzi (born 1962)
- Nuhu Muzaata (1955 - 2020)
- Shaban Ramadhan Mubaje (born 1955)

=== Zimbabwe ===
- Ismail ibn Musa Menk (born 1975)

== Asia ==
=== Afghanistan ===
- Abdul Ali Deobandi (1938–2009)
- Abdul Hakim Haqqani (born 1967)
- Abdul Malik
- Abdul Rauf
- Anwar Badakhshani (1932-2024)
- Asif Mohseni (1935–2009)
- Fazal Hadi Shinwari (1927–2011)
- Fazel Ahmed Manawi
- Hibatullah Akhundzada (born 1967)
- Jameel Ur Rahman (1939–1991)
- Mohammad Nabi Mohammadi (1920–2002)
- Mohammad Qasim Rasikh (born 1971)
- Muhammad Atta-ullah Faizani (born 1923 - ?)
- Muhammad Muhsin Khan (1919-2022)
- Muhammad Ayaz Niazi (1964–2020)
- Mujib Rahman Ansari (1982–2022)
- Mullah Omar (1960–2013)
- Mufti Nemat
- Rahimullah Haqqani (died 2022)

=== Bahrain ===
- Abdul Amir al-Jamri (1938-2006)
- Ali Salman (born 1965)
- Isa Qassim (born 1937)

=== Iran ===
- Abd al-A'la al-Sabziwari (1910–1993)
- Abdulrahman Fattahi (born 1950s)
- Abdollah Javadi-Amoli (born 1933)
- Ahmad Jannati (born 1927)
- Ahmad Mojtahedi Tehrani (1923–2008)
- Ali Akbar Ghoreishi (born 1928)
- Ali Mohammad Dastgheib Shirazi (born 1935)
- Ali Movahedi-Kermani (born 1931)
- Ali Khamenei (1939–2026)
- Fakhraddin Mousavi (1930–2021)
- Hassan Hassanzadeh Amoli (1928–2021)
- Hossein Mazaheri (born 1933)
- Hossein Wahid Khorasani (1921–2026)
- Hussein-Ali Montazeri (1922–2009)
- Iftikhār al-Tujjar (1912–1977)
- Ja'far Sobhani (born 1929)
- Jawad Tabrizi (1926–2006)
- Lotfollah Safi Golpaygani (1919–2022)
- Mohammad Ali Gerami Qomi (born 1938)
- Mohammad Ali Mousavi Jazayeri (born 1941)
- Mohammad Ebrahim Jannaati (1933–2026)
- Mohammad Kazem Shariatmadari (1904–1986)
- Mohammad Khamenei (born 1935)
- Mostafa Hosseini Tabatabaei (born 1936)
- Muhammad Husayn Tabatabai (1903–1981)
- Mohammad Sadeq Rouhani (1926–2022)
- Mohammad Sadeqi Tehrani (1926–2011)
- Mohammad Sadoughi (1909–1982)
- Mohammad Taghi Mesbah Yazdi (1935–2021)
- Mohammad-Taqi Bahjat Foumani (1916–2009)
- Mohammad Yazdi (1931–2020)
- Mousa Shubairi Zanjani (1928–2026)
- Naser Makarem Shirazi (born 1927)
- Ruhollah Khomeini (1900–1989)
- Taqi Tabatabaei Qomi (1923–2016)
- Yasubedin Rastegar Jooybari (born 1940)
- Yousef Saanei (1937–2020)
- Zīnah al-Sādāt Humāyūnī (1917–2016)
- Zohreh Sefati (born 1948)

=== Iraq ===
- Abbas Modaresi Yazdi (1943–2020)
- Abu al-Qasim al-Khoei (1899–1992)
- Ahmad Hassani Baghdadi (born 1945)
- Ali al-Milani (born 1948)
- Ali al-Sistani (born 1930)
- Allaedin Ghoraifi (born 1945)
- Fazel Maleki (born 1953)
- Hassan al-Shirazi (1935–1980)
- Hussein Esmaeel al-Sadr (born 1952)
- Kamal al-Haydari (born 1956)
- Kazem al-Haeri (born 1938)
- Mahmoud al-Sarkhi (born 1964)
- Mohammad al-Sadr (1943–1999)
- Mohammad al-Shirazi (1928–2001)
- Mohammad Ali Tabatabaei Hassani (1945–2017)
- Mohammad Hussaini Shahroudi (1925–2019)
- Mohammed Ridha al-Shirazi (1959–2008)
- Mohammad Taher Khaqani (born 1940)
- Mohammad Taqi al-Modarresi (born 1945)
- Mohammad Yaqoobi (born 1960)
- Morteza Hosseini Fayaz (1929–2014)
- Muhammad Baqir al-Sadr (1935–1980)
- Sadiq al-Shirazi (born 1942)
- Shamsodin Vaezi (born 1936)
- Shahab ud-Din Mar'ashi Najafi (1897–1990)

=== Jordan ===
- Abdul Karim Khasawneh (born 1944)
- Nuh al-Qudah (1939–2010)
- Nuh Ha Mim Keller (born 1954)
- Sa'id Foudah (born 1967)
- Umar Sulayman al-Ashqar (1930–2012)

=== Kuwait ===
- Muhammad Baqir al-Muhri (1948-2015)
- Muhammad Hisham at-Tahiri (born 1969)
- Nabil Al Awadi (born 1970)
- Yasser Al-Habib (born 1979)

=== Lebanon ===
- Abdullah al-Harari (1910–2008)
- Gibril Haddad (born 1960)
- Hisham Kabbani (born 1945)
- Mohammad Hussein Fadlallah (1935–2010)
- Musa al-Sadr (1928–1978)
- Sobhi Mahmassani (1909–1986)

=== Oman ===
- Ahmed bin Hamad al-Khalili (born 1942)
- Zohurul Hoque (1926–2017)

=== Palestine ===
- Abd Al Aziz Awda (born 1946 or 1950)
- Abdel Latif Moussa (1959–2009)
- Abdullah Yusuf Azzam (1941–1989)
- Amin al-Husseini (1897–1974)
- Ekrima Sa'id Sabri (born 1939)
- Issam Amira
- Muhammad Ahmad Hussein (born 1966)
- Raed Salah (born 1958)
- Taissir Tamimi
- Taqiuddin al-Nabhani (1909–1977)

=== Saudi Arabia ===
- Abu Abd al-Rahman Ibn Aqil al-Zahiri (born 1938)
- Abd al-Aziz al-Tarifi (born 1976)
- Abd Al-Aziz Fawzan Al-Fawzan (born 1964)
- Abd al-Aziz ibn Abd Allah ibn Baaz (1910–1999)
- Abdulbari ath-Thubaity (born 1960)
- Abdul-Rahman al-Barrak (born 1933 or 1934)
- Abdul Aziz al-Harbi (born 1965)
- Abdulaziz Al Sheikh (born 1940)
- Abdulmohsen Al-Qasim (born 1967)
- Abdul Rahman Al-Sudais (born 1960)
- Abdullah Awad Al Juhany (born 1976)
- Abdullah al-Ghudayyan (1926–2010)
- Abdullah al-Muhaysini
- Adil al-Kalbani (born 1959)
- Ahmad ibn Umar al-Hazimi
- Al-Shu'aybi (died 2001)
- Al-Uthaymin (1925–2001)
- Ali al-Khudair
- Ali Bin Abdur Rahman Al Huthaify (born 1947)
- Assim Al-Hakeem (born 1962)
- Bakr Abu Zayd (1944–2008)
- Bandar Baleela (born 1975)
- Fahd Al-Qadi (1957–2019)
- Hatim al-Awni (born 1966)
- Ibn Humaid (1908–1981)
- Ibn Jibrin (1933–2009)
- Ibrahim ibn Muhammad Al ash-Sheikh
- Maher Al-Mu'aiqly (born 1969)
- Mohamad al-Arefe (born 1970)
- Muhammad ibn Alawi al-Maliki (1944–2004)
- Muhammad Al-Munajid (born 1960)
- Muhammad Ayyub (1952–2016)
- Muhammad bin Abdul Karim Issa (born 1965)
- Muhammad Muhsin Khan (1927–2021)
- Nasir al-Fahd (born 1968)
- Rabee al-Madkhali (1931–2025)
- Saad al-Ateeq (born 1969)
- Saad al Ghamdi (born 1967)
- Safar al-Hawali (born 1950)
- Salah Al Budair (born 1970)
- Saleh Al-Fawzan (born 1933)
- Salih al Sheikh (Born 1959)
- Saleh Al-Maghamsi (born 1963)
- Saud Al-Shuraim (born 1964)
- Saleh Al-Talib (born 1974)
- Sulayman al-Ruhayli (born 1966)
- Sulaiman Al-Alwan (born 1969)
- Sheikh Mahmoud Khalil Al-Qari (death 2022)
- Usama bin Abdullah Khayyat (born 1956)
- Yasser Al-Dosari (born 1980)
- Ziya-ur-Rahman Azmi (1943–2020)

=== Syria ===
- Abd al-Fattah Abu Ghudda (1917–1997)
- Adnan al-Aroor (born 1948)
- Ahmad Badreddin Hassoun (born 1949)
- Ahmed Kuftaro (1915–2004)
- Ali Al-Tantawi (1909–1999)
- Muhammad Ajaj Al-Khatib (1932–2021)
- Muhammad 'Awwamah (born 1940)
- Mohammed Rateb al-Nabulsi (born 1939)
- Muhammad Ali al-Sabuni (1930–2021)
- Muhammad al-Yaqoubi (born 1963)
- Muhammad bin Yahya al-Ninowy (born 1966)
- Muhammad Nasiruddin al-Albani (1914–1999)
- Muhammad Said Ramadan al-Bouti (1929–2013)
- Munira al-Qubaysi (1933–2022)
- Shuaib Al Arna'ut (1928–2016)

=== Turkey ===
- Ahmet Mahmut Ünlü (born 1965)
- Ali Bardakoğlu (born 1952)
- Ali Erbaş (born 1961)
- Cemalnur Sargut (born 1962)
- Hidayet Şefkatli Tuksal (born 1963)
- Hüseyin Hilmi Işık (1911–2001)
- Mahmud Esad Coşan (1938–2001)
- Mahmut Ustaosmanoğlu (1929–2022)
- Metin Balkanlıoğlu (1958-2018)
- Mehmed Fatih Çıtlak (born 1967)
- Mehmet Görmez (born 1959)
- Mustafa Çağrıcı (born 1950)
- Muzaffer Ozak (1916–1985)
- Nazim Al-Haqqani (1922–2014)
- Osman Nuri Topbaş (born 1942)
- Ömer Tuğrul İnançer (1946–2022)
- Said Nursi (1877-1960)
- Süleyman Ateş (born 1933)
- Yaşar Nuri Öztürk (1951–2016)

=== United Arab Emirates ===
- Ahmed al Haddad

=== Yemen ===
- Abdul Majeed al-Zindani (born 1942)
- Habib Ali al-Jifri (born 1971)
- Habib Umar bin Hafiz (born 1963)
- Mohammed bin Ismail Al Amrani (1921–2021)
- Muqbil bin Hadi al-Wadi'i (1933–2001)
- Yahya al-Hajuri

=== South Asia ===
==== Bangladesh ====
- Abdul Latif Chowdhury Fultali (1913–2008)
- Abdul Halim Bukhari (1945–2022)
- Abdul Hamid Khan Bhashani (1880–1976)
- Abdul Haque Faridi (1903–1996)
- Abdul Jabbar Jahanabadi (1937–2016)
- Abdul Khaleque Mondal (1944–2023)
- Abdul Malek Halim
- Abdul Matin Chowdhury (1915–1990)
- Abdur Rahim (1918–1987)
- Abdur Rahman (scholar) (1920–2015)
- Abdur Rahman Kashgarhi (1912–1971)
- Abdus Salam Chatgami (1943–2021)
- Abdus Sobhan (1936–2020)
- Abu Zafar Mohammad Saleh (1915–1990)
- A F M Khalid Hossain (born 1959)
- Ahmed Ali Enayetpuri (1898–1959)
- Belayet Hossain Birbhumi (1887—1984)
- Ashraf Ali Bishwanathi (1928–2005)
- Athar Ali Bengali (1891–1976)
- Azizul Haq (1903–1961)
- Azizul Haque (1919–2012)
- Deen Muhammad Khan (1900–1974)
- Delwar Hossain Sayeedi (born 1940)
- Farid Uddin Chowdhury (born 1947)
- Farid Uddin Masood (born 1950)
- Fazlul Karim (1935–2006)
- Fazlul Haque Amini (1945–2012)
- Gulamur Rahman (1865–1937)
- Hafezzi Huzur (1895–1997)
- Ibrahim Chatuli (1894–1984)
- Ibrahim Ujani (1863–1943)
- Izharul Islam
- Khandaker Abdullah Jahangir (1961–2016)
- Khwaja Yunus Ali (1886–1951)
- Mahfuzul Haque (born 1969)
- Mahmudul Hasan (born 1950)
- Mohammad Akram Khan (1868–1969)
- Muhammad Asadullah Al-Ghalib (born 1948)
- Muhammad Faizullah (1892–1976)
- Muhammad Shahidullah (1885–1969)
- Muhammad Wakkas (1952–2021)
- Muhibbullah Babunagari (born 1935)
- Muhiuddin Khan (1935–2016)
- Mushahid Ahmad Bayampuri (1907–1971)
- Nur Hossain Kasemi (1945–2020)
- Nur Uddin Gohorpuri (1924–2005)
- Nurul Islam Farooqi (died 2014)
- Nurul Islam Jihadi (1948–2021)
- Nurul Islam Olipuri (born 1955)
- Obaidul Haque (1934–2008)
- Obaidullah Hamzah (born 1972)
- Ruhul Amin (born 1962)
- Sayed Muhammad Amimul Ehasan Barkati (1911–1974)
- Syed Najibul Bashar Maizbhandari (born 1959)
- Syed Rashid Ahmed Jaunpuri (1889–2001)
- Sajidur Rahman (born 1964)
- Sayed Kamaluddin Zafree (born 1945)
- Sheikh Ahmadullah (born 1981)
- Shah Ahmad Hasan (1882–1967)
- Shah Ahmad Shafi (1916–2020)
- Shahidul Islam (1960–2023)
- Shahinur Pasha Chowdhury (b. 1985)
- Shamsul Haque Faridpuri (1896–1969)
- Shamsul Huda Panchbagi (1897–1988)
- Syed Fazlul Karim (1935–2006)
- Syed Mohammad Saifur Rahman (born 1916)
- Syed Rezaul Karim (born 1971)
- Ubaidul Haq (1928–2007)
- Zia Uddin (born 1941)

==== India ====
- Abdul Hakkim Azhari (born 1971)
- Abdul Ghani Azhari (1922 - 2023)
- Abdul Hamid Qadri Badayuni (1898–1970)
- Abdul Haq Azmi (1928–2016)
- Abdul Jalil Choudhury (1925–1989)
- Abdul Khaliq Sambhali (1950–2021)
- Abdul Rashid Dawoodi (born 1979)
- Abdul Razzaq (1932–2021)
- Anzar Shah Kashmiri (1927–2008)
- Ameen Mian Qaudri (born 1955)
- Ahmed Ali Badarpuri (1915–2000)
- Ahmed Raza Khan Barelvi (1856 - 1921)
- Atiqur Rahman Usmani (1901–1984)
- Bashir al-Najafi (born 1942)
- Bashir-ud-din Farooqi (1934–2019)
- E. K. Aboobacker Musliyar (1914–1996)
- E Sulaiman Musliyar (born 1942)
- Faizul Waheed (1966–2021)
- Fuzail Ahmad Nasiri (born 1978)
- Habibur Rahman Khairabadi (born 1933)
- Hafizur Rahman Wasif Dehlavi (1910–1987)
- Hamid al-Ansari Ghazi (1909–1992)
- Hashmi Miya (born 1947)
- Hassan Raza Khan (1859–1908)
- Jaleel Ahmad (1941-1996)
- Kafilur Rahman Nishat Usmani (1942–2006)
- Kaif Raza Khan (born 2001)
- Kalbe Abid (1923–1986)
- Kalbe Sadiq (1939–2020)
- Kanthapuram A. P. Aboobacker Musliyar (born 1939)
- Kanniyath Ahmed Musliyar (1900–1993)
- Khalid Saifullah Rahmani (born 1956)
- Mohammad Najeeb Qasmi
- Masroor Abbas Ansari (born 1975)
- Muhammad Salim Qasmi (1926–2018)
- Muhammad Sufyan Qasmi (born 1954)
- Muhammad Taqi Amini (1926–1991)
- Muhammad Yunus Jaunpuri (1937–2017)
- Minnatullah Rahmani (1913–1991)
- Muhammad Madni Ashraf Ashrafi Al-Jilani (born 1938)
- Mujahidul Islam Qasmi (1936–2002)
- Mustafa Raza Khan Qadri (1892–1981)
- Nazir Ahmad Qasmi (born 20 June 1964)
- Nizamuddin Asir Adrawi (1926–2021)
- Noor Alam Khalil Amini (1952–2021)
- Qamaruzzaman Azmi (born 1946)
- Rafiq Ahmad Pampori (born 1956)
- Rahmatullah Mir Qasmi (born 1956)
- Safi-Ur-Rahman Mubarakpuri
- Saeed Ahmad Akbarabadi (1908–1985)
- Sa'id Akhtar Rizvi (1927–2002)
- Salman Mazahiri (1946–2020)
- Sayyid Abdurahman Imbichikoya Thangal Al-Aydarusi Al-Azhari (1922–2015)
- hah Alam Gorakhpuri (born 1969)
- Shihabuddeen Ahmed Koya Shaliyathi (1884–1954)
- Shakir Ali Noori (born 1960)
- Shams Naved Usmani (1931–1993)
- Syed Ahmad Hashmi (1932–2001)
- Syed Aqeel-ul-Gharavi (born 1964)
- Syed Hamidul Hasan
- Sayyid Ibraheem Khaleel Al Bukhari (1964 - )
- Syed Mohammed Mukhtar Ashraf (1916–1996)
- Sayed Muhammed Ali Shihab Thangal (1936–2009)
- Tauqeer Raza Khan (Islamic Cleric)
- Usman Mansoorpuri (1944–2021)
- Wahiduddin Khan (1925–2021)
- Wasiullah Abbas (born 1948)
- Yasin Mazhar Siddiqi (1944–2020)
- Zayn al-Abidin Sajjad Meerthi (1910–1991)
- Zeeshan Haider Jawadi (1938–2000)
- Ziauddin Madani (1877–1981)
- Ziaul Mustafa Razvi Qadri (born 1935)

==== Indonesia ====
- Abdul Somad (born 1977)
- Abdullah Gymnastiar (born 1962)
- Abdurrahman Wahid (1940–2009)
- Abdul Qadir Djaelani (1938–2021)
- Abdullah Wasi'an (1917–2011)
- Adi Hidayat (born 1984)
- Adian Husaini (born 1965)
- Ahmad Bahauddin Nursalim (born 1970)
- Ahmad Muhtadi Dimyathi (born 1953)
- Ali Alwi (born 1967)
- Ali Yafie (1926–2023)
- Bachtiar Nasir (born 1967)
- Bahar bin Smith (born 1985)
- B.J. Habibie (1936–2019)
- Budhy Munawar Rachman (born 1963)
- Fakih Usman (1904–1968)
- Felix Siauw (born 1984)
- Hamka (1908–1981)
- Hasyim Muzadi (1944–2017)
- Ilyas Ruhiat (1934–2007)
- Jefri Al Buchori (1973–2013)
- Khalid Basalamah (born 1975)
- Mamah Dedeh (born 1951)
- Maria Ulfah (born 1955)
- Ma'ruf Amin (born 1943)
- Mas Mansoer (1896–1946)
- Miftachul Achyar (born 1953)
- Mohammad Natsir (1908–1993)
- Muhammad Hanif Alatas (born 1993)
- Muhammad Luthfi bin Yahya (born 1947)
- Muhammad Murtadho Dimyathi (born 1958)
- Muhammad Yahya Waloni (1970-2025)
- Mustofa Bisri (born 1944)
- Munzir Al-Musawa (1973–2013)
- Noer Muhammad Iskandar (1955–2020)
- Quraish Shihab (born 1944)
- Rizieq Shihab (born 1965)
- Saggaf bin Muhammad Aljufri (1937-2021)
- Sahal Mahfudh (1937–2014)
- Said Aqil Siradj (born 1953)
- Shamsi Ali (born 1967)
- Siti Noordjannah Djohantini (born 1958)
- Siti Chamamah Soeratno (born 1941)
- Syafiq Riza Basalamah (born 1977)
- Uci Turtusi (1964–2021)
- Ustadz Solmed (born 1983)
- Wijayanto (born 1968)
- Yahya Cholil Staquf (born 1966)
- Yazid bin Abdul Qadir Jawas (1963–2024)
- Yusuf Mansur (born 1976)
- Zainuddin M. Z. (1952–2011)

==== Malaysia ====
- Abdul Hadi Awang (born 1947)
- Asri Zainul Abidin (born 1971)
- Asyraf Wajdi Dusuki (born 1976)
- Burhanuddin al-Helmy (1911–1969)
- Fathul Bari Mat Jahya (born 1980)
- Haron Din (1940–2016)
- Harussani Zakaria (1939–2021)
- Hassan Azhari (1928–2018)
- Hussain Yee (born 1950)
- Juanda Jaya (born 1972)
- Kazim Elias (born 1972)
- Khairuddin Razali (born 1973)
- Mohd Na'im Mokhtar (born 1967)
- Muhammad Nur Manuty (1949–2025)
- Nik Abdul Aziz Nik Mat (1931–2015)
- Osman Bakar (born 1946)
- Rusni Hassan (born 1968)
- Syed Muhammad Naquib al-Attas (born 1931)
- Syeikh Abdullah Fahim (1869–1961)
- Tuan Ibrahim Tuan Man (born 1960)
- Yusof Rawa (1922–2000)
- Zailan Morris (died 2021)
- Zulkifli Mohamad Al-Bakri (born 1969)

==== Pakistan ====
- Abdul Rashid (1964-2007)
- Abdul Sattar Khan Niazi (1915–2001)
- Abu Salman Shahjahanpuri (1940–2021)
- Abu Yahya (born 1969)
- Abul A'la Maududi (1903–1979)
- Adil Khan (1957–2020)
- Ahmad Nurani (1926–2003)
- Ameer Muhammad Akram Awan (1934–2017)
- Amin Ahsan Islahi (1904–1997)
- Aqeel Turabi (1934–2009)
- Badi' ud-Din Shah (Born 1936)
- Ehsan Elahi Zaheer (1945–1987)
- Fateh Muhammad Panipati (1905–1987)
- Ghulam Ahmed Perwez (1903–1985)
- Ghulam Ali Okarvi (1919–2000)
- Ghulam Mohi-ud-Din Ghaznavi (1902–1975)
- Ghulam Rasul Sa'idi (1937–2016)
- Hakeem Muhammad Akhtar (1928–2013)
- Ilyas Qadri (born 1950)
- Israr Ahmed (1932–2010)
- Javed Ahmad Ghamidi (born 1952)
- Jawad Naqvi (born 1952)
- Khadim Hussain Rizvi (1966–2020)
- Khalid Masud (1935–2003)
- Khurshid Ahmad (born 1932)
- Manzur Ahmad Chinioti (1931-2004)
- Muhammad Abdullah (1935-1998)
- Muhammad Alauddin Siddiqui (1936–2017)
- Muhammad Ali Mirza (1977)
- Muhammad Hanif Nadvi (1908–1987)
- Muhammad Raza Saqib Mustafai (born 1972)
- Muneeb-ur-Rehman (born 1945)
- Nasir al-Din Nasir Hunzai (1917–2017)
- Nizamuddin Shamzai (1952– 2004)
- Rafi Usmani (1936–2022)
- Rasheed Turabi (1908–1973)
- Sanaullah Amritsari (1868-1948)
- Shah Turab-ul-Haq (1944–2016)
- Shehanshah Hussain Naqvi (born 1974)
- Syed Adnan Kakakhail (born 1975)
- Syed Shujaat Ali Qadri (1941–1993)
- Talib Jauhari (1939–2020)
- Taqi Usmani (born 1949)
- Tariq Masood (born 1975)
- Uzair Gul Peshawari (1886–1989)
- Zar Wali Khan (1953–2020)
- Zubayr 'Ali Za'i (1957–2013)

=== Central Asia ===
==== Kazakhstan ====
- Absattar Derbisali (1947–2021)
- Ratbek hadji Nysanbayev (1940-2026)

==== Uzbekistan ====
- Muhammad Sadik Muhammad Yusuf (1952–2015)
- Usmankhan Alimov (1950–2021)

=== East Asia ===
==== China ====
- Du Shuzhen (born 1924)
- Muhammad Ma Jian (1906–1978)

==== Philippines ====
- Ahmad Bashir (1919–1989)
- Said Ahmad Basher (born 1951)

== Europe ==
=== Albania ===
- Al-Albani (1914–1999)
- Hafiz Sabri Koçi (1921-2004)
- Haxhi Faik Hoxha (1930-2011)
- Haxhi Xhaferr Shkodra (1931-2016)
- Vehbi Sulejman Gavoçi (1923–2013)

=== Belarus ===
- Ismail Alieksandrovič (1929-2024)

=== Bosnia ===
- Husein Kavazović (born 1964)
- Jusuf Barčić (1967–2007)
- Mustafa Cerić (born 1952) Bosnia and Herzegovina

=== Croatia ===
- Ševko Omerbašić (born 1945)

=== Cyprus ===
- Nazim Al-Haqqani (1922–2014)

=== Kosovo ===
- Ali Jakupi (1913-1988) Kosovo
- Abdul Qader Arnaoot (1928–2004) Kosovo
- Ajni Sinani (born 1962)
- Mulla Idriz Gjilani (1901–1949) Kosovo
- Shefqet Krasniqi (born 1966) Kosovo
- Sherif Ahmeti (1920–1998) Kosovo
- Nexhat Ibrahimi (born 1959) Kosovo

=== North Macedonia ===
- Hafiz Idriz Idrizi (1936-2005)
- Jakup Asipi (1951-2006)
- Taxhedin Bislimi (1961)

=== Poland ===
- Tomasz Miśkiewicz (born 1977)

=== Romania ===
- Murat Yusuf (born 1977)

=== Russia ===
- Anas Pshikhachev (1967-2010)
- Ahmad Afandi Abdulaev (born 1959)
- Akhmad Kadyrov (1951–2004)
- Ildus Fayzov (born 1963)
- Ismail Berdiyev (1954–2024)
- Kamil Samigullin (born 1985)
- Rawil Ğaynetdin (born 1959)
- Said Afandi al-Chirkawi (1937–2012)
- Shamil Alyautdinov (born 1974)
- Talgat Tadzhuddin (born 1948)
- Valiulla Yakupov (1963 - 2012)

=== Serbia ===
- Muamer Zukorlić (1969-2022)

=== Ukraine ===
- Said Ismagilov (born 1978)

=== Western Europe ===
==== Austria ====
- Adnan Ibrahim (born 1966)
- Muhammad Asad (1900–1992)

==== Ireland ====
- Umar Al-Qadri (born 1982)

==== United Kingdom ====
- Abd al-Haqq Turkmani
- Abu Talhah Dawud Burbank
- Abu-Abdullah Adelabu London
- Abu Yusuf Riyadh ul Haq (born 1971) Leicester
- Ajmal Masroor (born 1971) London
- Ahmed Saad Al-Azhari (born 1978) London
- Haifaa Jawad Birmingham
- Haitham al-Haddad (born 1971) London
- Ibrahim Mogra (born 1965) Leicester
- Joel Hayward (born 1964) Cambridge
- Khurshid Ahmad (scholar) (born 1932) Leicester
- Martin Lings (1909–2005) Manchester
- Mohammad Akram Nadwi (born 1964) Oxford
- Muhammad Abdul Bari (born 1953) London
- Muhammad ibn Adam Al-Kawthari, Leicester
- Mohammed Hijab (born 1991), London
- Musharraf Hussain (born 1962) Nottingham
- Abu Layth (born 1979), Birmingham
- Ruqaiyyah Waris Maqsood (born 1942) London
- Shabbir Akhtar (born 1960) Bradford
- Timothy Winter (born 1960) London
- Yasser al-Habib (born 1979)
- Yusuf Motala (1946–2019) Lancashire

==== Switzerland ====
- Frithjof Schuon (1907–1998)
- Tariq Ramadan (born 1962) Geneva

== North America ==
=== Canada ===
- Ahmad Kutty (born 1946), Toronto
- Faraz Rabbani, Ontario
- Farhat Hashmi (born 1957)
- Ingrid Mattson (born 1963), Ontario
- Jamal Badawi, Halifax, Nova Scotia
- Muzaffar Iqbal (born 1954), Edmonton
- Reza Hosseini Nassab (born 1960), Toronto
- Shabir Ally (born 1953)

=== Jamaica ===
- Abdullah el-Faisal (born 1963)
- Bilal Philips (born 1947)

=== Trinidad ===
- Imran N. Hosein (born 1942)

=== United States ===
- Aminah McCloud (born 1958)
- Amina Wadud (born 1952)
- Amir Hussain Los Angeles, CA
- Asifa Quraishi
- Asma Barlas (born 1950)
- Azizah Y. al-Hibri (born 1943) Virginia
- Caner Dagli
- Dalia Mogahed
- Fazlur Rahman Malik (1919–1988) Illinois
- Fetullah Gulen (born 1941) Pennsylvania
- Hamza Yusuf (born 1958) Berkeley, CA
- Hamid Algar (born 1940) Berkeley, CA
- Hassan Hathout (1924–2009) Pasadena. CA
- Ismail al-Faruqi (1921–1986)
- Jonathan A.C. Brown (born 1977) Washington DC
- Kecia Ali (born 1972) Massachusetts
- Khaled Abou El Fadl (born 1963) California
- Khalid Yahya Blankinship (born 1949) Philadelphia, PA
- Laleh Bakhtiar (1938–2020)
- Louay Safi (born 1955)
- Maria Massi Dakake (born 1968)
- Mohammed Adam El-Sheikh (born 1945) Virginia
- Mohammad Hassan Khalil Michigan
- Muqtedar Khan (born 1966) Delaware
- Muzammil H. Siddiqi (born 1943)
- Omar Khalidi (1953–2010)
- Omar Suleiman Texas
- Omid Safi North Carolina
- Ovamir Anjum Ohio
- Riffat Hassan (born 1953)
- Seyyed Hossein Nasr (born 1933)
- Sherman Jackson California
- Umar Faruq Abd-Allah (born 1948) Chicago
- Wael Hallaq (born 1955) New York
- Warith Deen Mohammed (1933–2008) Illinois
- Yasir Qadhi (born 1975) Texas
- Yasir Nadeem al Wajidi (born 1982) Chicago
- Zaid Shakir (born 1956) California

== Oceania ==
=== Australia ===
- Charis Waddy (1909–2004)
- Fehmi Naji (1928–2016)
- Ibrahim Abu Mohamed
- Taj El-Din Hilaly (born 1941)

=== New Zealand ===
- Joel Hayward (born in Christchurch in 1964), lives in Abu Dhabi

== See also ==
- Education in Islam
- Islamic studies by author (non-Muslim or academic)
- Islamic studies
- List of Muslim comparative theologians
- List of female Islamic scholars
- List of Islamic historians
- List of Islamic jurists
- List of Islamic philosophers
- List of Muslim astronomers
- List of Muslim mathematicians
- List of Muslim scientists
- List of contemporary Sufi scholars
- List of Muslim writers and poets
