= Sinani =

Sinani is an Albanian surname. Notable people with the surname include:

- Ajni Sinani (born 1962), Albanian theologian, imam, alim and professor
- Ardita Sinani (born 1980), Serbian politician
- Danel Sinani (born 1997), Luxembourgish footballer
- Dejvid Sinani (born 1993), Serbian footballer
- Gazmend Sinani (1991–2018), Kosovo Albanian basketball player
- Ismet Sinani (born 1999), Kosovan footballer
- Mevlud Sinani, Albanian politician
- Sehid Sinani (born 1982), Swiss footballer
- Tahir Sinani (1964–2001), Albanian insurgent
- Vioresin Sinani (born 1977), Albanian footballer
