= Nuhu =

Nuhu is a given name. Notable people with the name include:

- Nuhu Abdullahi (born 1991), Nigerian actor and producer
- Nuhu Bajoga, Nigerian politician
- Nuhu Bamalli (1917–2001), Nigerian foreign minister
- Nuhu Bature (died 2021), Nigerian traditional ruler
- Nuhu Gidado (born 1958), Nigerian politician
- Nuhu Aliyu Labbo (born 1941), Nigerian politician
- Nuhu Mbogo Kyabasinga (1835–1921), prince of the Buganda Kingdom
- Nuhu Muzaata (1955–2020), Ugandan Muslim leader and spokesperson
- Nuhu G. Obaje (born 1961), Nigerian professor
- Nuhu Ribadu (born 1960), Nigerian politician and police officer
