= Syed Mukhtaruddin Shah =

Pakistani Islamic scholar (1950–2025)

Mufti Syed Mukhtaruddin Shah
- سید مختار الدین شاہ

Personal life
- Born: 1950 Karbogha Sharif, NWFP, West Pakistan
- Died: 29 December 2025 (aged 74–75) Shifa International Hospital, Islamabad, Pakistan
- Children: 3
- Citizenship: Pakistani

Religious life
- Religion: Islam
- Denomination: Sunni
- Order: Chishti
- Philosophy: Sufism
- Jurisprudence: Hanafi
- Movement: Deobandi

Muslim leader
- Students: Syed Adnan Kakakhail
- Influenced by: Zakariyya Kandhlawi
- Influenced: Mohammad Rizwan

Syed Mukhtaruddin Shah (1950 – 29 December 2025) was a Pakistani Islamic scholar and spiritual leader, who served as the Sheikh Al Hadith of Jamia Darul Uloom Karbogha Sharif in District Hangu and Patron of Wifaq ul Madaris Al-Arabia.

He was the disciple of Zakaria Kandhalvi and Shah's devotees included Syed Adnan Kakakhail and Pakistani cricketer Muhammad Rizwan.

Shah died at Shifa International Hospital in Islamabad on 29 December 2025.

== Writings ==
Shah was the author of many books, including:

- ʻAṣr-i ḥāzi̤r men̲ dīnī ik̲h̲tilāfāt aur maslak-i iʻtidāl
- Musalmānon̲ ke bāhamī ik̲h̲tilāfāt men̲ rāh-i maḥabbat
- Dahrīyat se Islām tak
- Z̲ikr-i Allāh ke faz̤āʼil va masāʼil
- Bilā sūd bainkārī ke k̲h̲ilāf baʻz̤ ʻulamāʼ ke fatvaʹ kī ḥaqīqat is kā pas manẓar va pesh manẓar

• Kitabuz Zakaat

• Kitabus Soum

• Kitab ul Aqaid

• Kitabut Talaq

• Israr ul Urooj

• Maslak e Aitdal

• Zikrullah Kay Fazail wa Masail

• Islahi Majalis
