= Wasiullah =

Wasiullah is a given name. Notable people with the name include:

- Wasiullah Abbas (born 1948), Indian Islamic scholar
- Wasiullah Khan (fl. 1978), founder and chancellor of East-West University
