= Modarresi =

Modaressi may refer to:

- Al-Modarresi family
- Abbas Modaresi Yazdi (1943–2020), Iraqi Shi'a Marja'
- Golnaz Modarresi Ghavami (born 1966), Iranian linguist
- Hadi al-Modarresi (born 1947), Iraqi-Iranian Ayatollah
- Hossein Modarressi (born 1952), Iranian jurist
- Koorosh Modaressi (born 1950), Iranian communist
- Mohammad-Reza Modarresi Yazdi (born 1955), Iranian Ayatollah
- Mohammad-Taqi al-Modarresi (born 1945), Iraqi-Iranian Marja' (Grand Ayatollah)
- Taqi Modarressi (1931–1997), Iranian writer and child psychiatrist
- Yahya Modarresi (born 1945), Iranian linguist
