= Ghulam Rasul Sa'idi =

Pakistani Islamic scholar (1937–2016)

Personal life
- Born: 14 September 1937
- Died: 5 February 2016 (aged 78)

Religious life
- Religion: Islam
- Denomination: Sunni
- Jurisprudence: Hanafi
- Creed: Maturidi
- Movement: Barelvism

Ghulam Rasul Sa'idi (Note: Urdu: غلام رسول سعیدی, romanized: Ghulām Rasūl Saʿīdī) (14 September 1937–5 February 2016) was a Pakistani Islamic scholar. A leading figure of the Barelvi movement of Sunni Islam, Sa'idi is known for his major books Tafsir Tibyan-ul-Qur'an, Nemat ul Bari shara Sahi Bukhari, Shara Sahi muslim.

== Early life and background ==
He was born in 1937 in the town of Sa'idabad, which is located in the Azad Kashmir region of present-day Pakistan.

He began his formal education at local madrasas (Islamic schools) in Azad Kashmir. He studied under scholars in various cities in the Indian subcontinent. He studied Arabic, Persian, and Islamic jurisprudence (Fiqh) extensively and also studied of hadith and tafsir (Quranic exegesis).

=== Education ===
Sa'idi's teachers include Mawlana Abdul Ghafur Qadri and Ustaz al Ulama Allama Mufti Muhammad Husayn Nayimi Ashrafi, Founder of Jamia Naeemia, Lahore Khalifa of Shabiha Ghawth al Azam Sayyid Ali Husayn Ashrafi Jilani Kichochavi and Mufti Aziz Ahmad Qadri Badayuni.

== Life ==
He began teaching in 1966 at Jamia Naeemia Lahore, where in 1970 he started teaching Sahih al Bukhari. In 1978 he was hired by Sunni Jurist Mufti Sayyid Shujaat Ali Qadri to teach at Jamia Naeemia Karachi.

He then returned to his position as Shaykh al Hadith at Jamia Naeemia lahore. In 1983, he began to suffer from diabetes, along with severe back pain that prevented him from teaching while sitting on the floor to teach in the traditional way. He temporarily left his teaching post but returned in 1985. From 1985 to 2016 he served as the Shaykh al Hadith of Jamia Naeemia Karachi.

== Selected works ==
Saeedi authored several significant books, particularly in the fields of Hadith, Fiqh, and Quranic exegesis. These include:

- Sharah Sahih Muslim (Urdu): A comprehensive commentary on Sahih Muslim, one of the six major Hadith collections. Available in 7 volumes in Urdu.
- Naimat ul Bari, Sharah Sahhih Bukhari (Urdu): A comprehensive commentary on Sahih Bukhari, toppest of the six major Hadith collections (Sihah Sitta). Available in 16 volumes in Urdu
- Tibyanul Quran: An esteemed interpretation (Tafsir) of the Quran in Urdu. Provides insights into the meanings and context of Quranic verses and available in 13 volumes.
- Tibyan ul Furqan: An esteemed interpretation (Tafsir) of the Quran in Urdu with different style from Tibyan-ul-Quran and available in 6 volumes.
- Tazkiratul Muhaddiseen: A biographical work that profiles Hadith scholars. Offers valuable information about the lives and contributions of Hadith experts.
- Maqalat-i-Saeedi: A collection of scholarly essays and discourses. Covers various topics related to Islamic jurisprudence, theology, and spirituality.
- Tauzeehul Bayan: A concise commentary on the Quranic text. Focuses on explaining the verses in a straightforward manner.
- Maqam-i-Wilayat-o-Nabuwat: Explores the concept of sainthood (wilayat) and prophethood (nabuwat) in Islam.
