= Haitham al-Haddad =

British Muslim television presenter and preacher

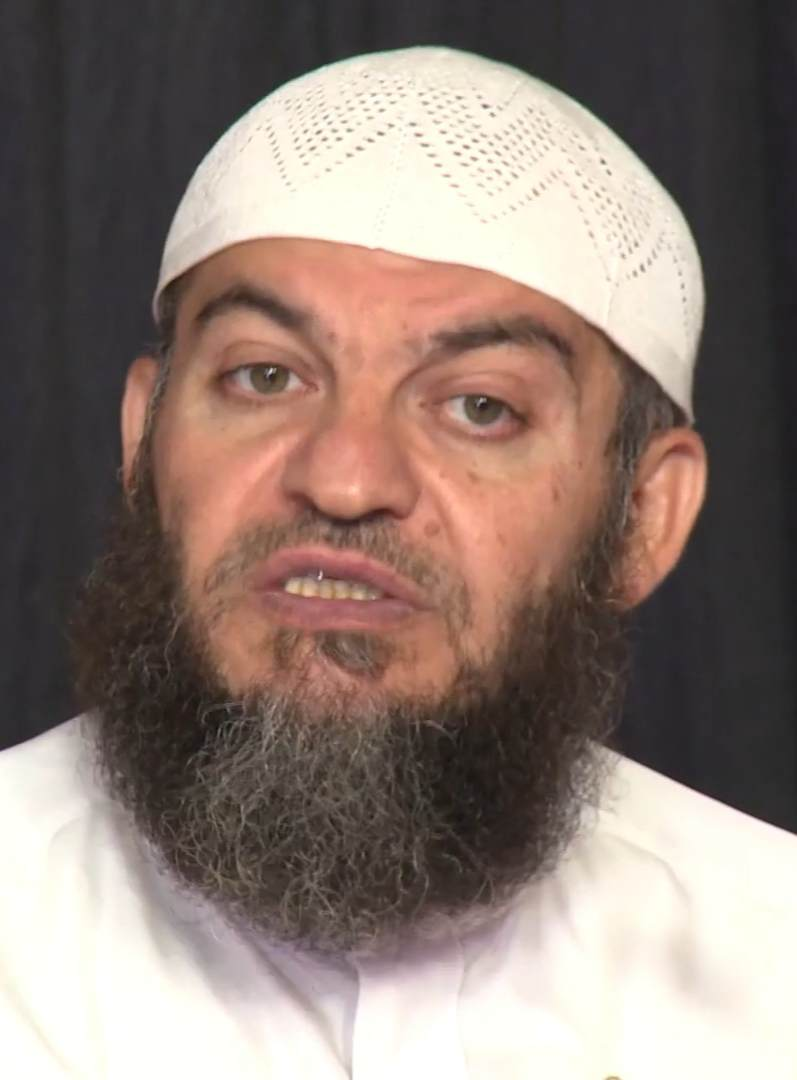
- Title: Sheikh, Imam

Personal life
- Occupation: Islamic Scholar

Religious life
- Religion: Islam
- Denomination: Sunni

Haitham al-Haddad is a British Muslim television presenter, and Islamic scholar of Palestinian origin. Al-Haddad sits on the boards of advisors for Islamic organisations in the United Kingdom, including the Islamic Sharia Council. He is the chair and operations advisor and a trustee for the Muslim Research and Development Foundation. Some of his views have been considered controversial, including remarks on Jews, sodomy and female circumcision.

== Education ==
Haitham al-Haddad gained a PhD at SOAS, University of London and is a Saudi-trained Imam. In Medina he studied with a student of the influential Salafi scholar ibn al Uthaymeen, while he also obtained a civil engineering degree in Sudan. His PhD thesis from SOAS, submitted in 2010, was on Islamic law and entitled "A critical analysis of selected aspects of Sunni Muslim minority fiqh, with particular reference to contemporary Britain."

== Controversial remarks ==
In 2001, Haitham al-Haddad allegedly said "I will tell you the truth about the fight between us and Jews who are the enemies of God and the descendants of apes and pigs". He later said that "this is the translation of what has been attributed to me" and that it had been incorrectly translated from Arabic to English.

A journalist for Radio Netherlands Worldwide wrote, "Strikingly, the cleric omits the definite article "the" before "Jews." In the Arabic language, this omission could be taken to mean he was not speaking about Jews in general but only about those Jews who are enemies of God and descendants of apes and pigs.

Haddad was also accused of praising Osama bin Laden in 2011 following the latter's death; an allegation for which he successfully claimed libel and a retraction from The Times.

In an article called ‘Standing up against Homosexuality’, Haddad wrote of “the scourge of homosexuality”, which he calls a “criminal act”. On women, he declared that “a man should not be questioned why he hit his wife, because this is something between them”. In addition to this he has also claimed that “the most honourable and worthy role for a woman is striving to be a fine wife...this role does not only secure the best for a woman in the hereafter, but also fits perfectly with her natural disposition” He has claimed that there is a "proper" way of performing FGM, further saying "it is consensus of all the scholars that female circumcision is sunnah [proper]".

== Controversial events ==
=== 2012 Netherlands visit ===
In February 2012, the Dutch parliament majority tried to prevent Haddad speaking at Vrije Universiteit Amsterdam. The university subsequently cancelled the event. Haddad blamed the opposition to him on a Jewish lobby.

=== London "mega-mosque" project ===
Haddad called for a 15,000-people march to put pressure on Newham council to permit building of a large mosque in West Ham, London Borough of Newham, which would have been three times the size of St Paul's Cathedral. Opposition to al-Haddad and the mosque project as a whole was led by a local councillor, Alan Craig, who eventually in 2014 would join UKIP.

=== University of Westminster ===
In February 2015, the University of Westminster postponed a talk by al-Haddad after it was revealed that Mohammed Emwazi, known as "Jihadi John", became radicalised at that university. Over 3,000 had signed a petition for him to be banned from campus, stating that his presence could endanger LGBT students.

=== University of Kent ===
In March 2015, the University of Kent postponed a talk by al-Haddad, hosted by the university's Islamic Society as part of "Discover Islam Week". The university's Vice-Chancellor cancelled the talk after controversy spread among some students regarding al-Haddad's messages.

== Cases against the media ==
=== Libel case against 'The Times' ===
In August 2015 al-Haddad successfully claimed for libel against The Times newspaper. Following the settlement the Sunday Times published a correction (16 Aug, 2015) clarifying amongst a number of false allegations, that al-Haddad had not praised Osama bin Laden, and neither had he been banned from speaking at the London School of Economics nor London Metropolitan University.

=== Libel case against 'Telegraph Media Group' ===
In June 2019 al-Haddad settled a claim against the Telegraph Media Group. The Sunday Telegraph had published a series of articles during 2015, which it continued to publish online, which variously claimed that Dr Al-Haddad had described Jews as “the descendants of apes and pigs”, and the “brethren of swine and pigs”.

As part of the terms of settlement, the Telegraph contributed £62500 towards al-Haddad's legal costs, published a statement withdrawing the allegations, and apologised.

== See also ==
- Islam21c
