= Rusni Hassan =

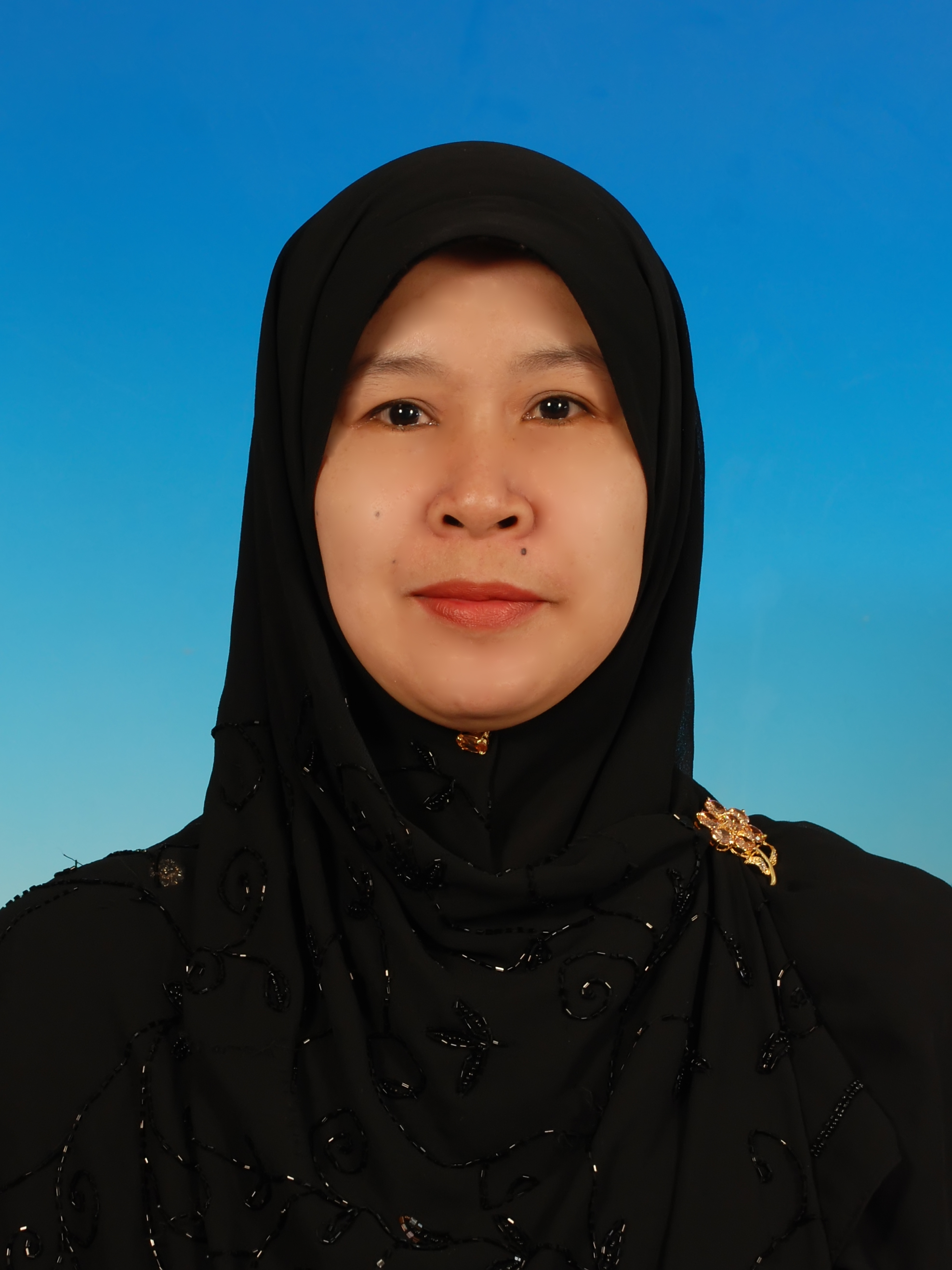
Prof. Dr. Rusni Hassan

Rusni Hassan currently is a Professor at IIUM Institute of Islamic Banking and Finance, International Islamic University Malaysia. Previously, she was a Deputy Dean at the Institute, a Coordinator for Research and Publication and Course Coordinator for Islamic Law of Transactions and Islamic Banking and Takaful. She was a Research Committee for Review of Islamic Banking Laws, Central Bank of Malaysia and an examiner for Financial Planner Association of Malaysia. Presently she is the examiner for the Chartered Institute of Management Accountants. She was a member of Shariah Advisory Council Bank Negara Malaysia and Shariah Advisor for Association of Islamic Banking Institutions Malaysia. She also served as Secretary for the Association of Shariah Advisors in Islamic Finance Malaysia for 8 years starting from 2012 until 2020.

In her capacity as Shariah Committee, she has advised numerous Islamic Financial Institutions locally and internationally on shariah compliance aspects on product development and structuring, legal documentations and Shariah audit. She has also presented papers for many international conference and seminars locally and abroad. She has spoken extensively in seminars, workshops, conferences and trainings on various Islamic Finance issues.

Her publication includes books on Islamic Banking and Takaful, Islamic Banking under Malaysian Law, articles of journals, Shariah Law Reports and other publications. She is also Shariah Committee for House Development Financing Corporation and Housing Development Corporation Maldives.

== Scientific Experience and Specialization ==
=== Previous Experience ===
- Shariah Committee for HSBC Amanah (M) Berhad (2005–2010)
- Shariah Committee for HSBC Amanah (Takaful) Berhad (2007–2010)
- Shariah Advisory Council for Bank Negara Malaysia (2010–2016)
- Shariah Committee for Housing Corporation Maldives (2013–2015)
- Board of Director for International Islamic University Malaysia Continuing Education, IIUM Holdings (2014–2016)
- Board of Director for IIUM Shariah Advisory, IIUM Holdings (2015–2019)

==== Current Position (2021) ====
- Shariah Advisory Council for Association of Islamic Banking Institutions Malaysia (AIBIM) (2012–present)
- Shariah Committee for Housing Development Financing Corporation Maldives (2014–present)
- Shariah Committee for Hong Leong Islamic Bank (2017–present)
- Shariah Committee for Etiqa Family Takaful (2017–present)
- Shariah Committee for Etiqa General Takaful (2017–present)
- Shariah Committee for Waqf An-Nur (2017–present)
- Shariah Committee for Export-Import Bank (EXIM Bank) (2018–present)
- Shariah Committee for Maruah Emas Sdn Bhd (2018–present)
- Board of Director for Etiqa General Takaful (2019–present)

== Education ==
She graduated with LLB (Honours) and LLB (Shariah) (First Class), Master of Comparative Laws and Ph.D. in Law from IIUM respectively.

Her area of specialization includes Islamic Banking, Finance and Islamic Documentations, Islamic Capital Market, Takaful and Islamic Law of Transactions.

== Books ==
- Islamic Banking and Takaful, Second Edition. Pearson. 2011. ISBN 978-967-349-173-5.
- Islamic Banking and Takaful. Third Edition. Pearson. 2015. ISBN 978-967-349-687-7
- Islamic Banking under the Malaysia Law, A.S. Noordeen, 2011, ISBN 978-983-065-318-1
- Islamic Banking and Takaful (Lecture Materials), Scholar Mind Publishing. ISBN 978-96-73491-73-5
- Islamic Banking in Malaysia: Cases and Commentaries. 2017.ISBN 978-967-457-125-2
- Remedies for default in Islamic banking: home and car financing. Sweet & Maxwell Asia/Thomson Reuters Malaysia. 2018. ISBN 978-967-2187-03-5
- Termination of contractual obligation in Islamic commercial Law. Essential Readings. CERT Publications Sdn Bhd, Malaysia. 2019. ISBN 978-967-0175-16-4
- Emerging issues in Islamic finance law and practice in Malaysia. Emerald Publishing Limited, United Kingdom. ISBN 978-1-78973-546-8
- Corporate Governance Practice in Islamic Financial Institutions (PDF). IBFIM. 2014. ISBN 978-967-0149-40-0.
- Shariah Governance Structure in Malaysia, Indonesia and Kuwait. LAP LAMBERT Academic Publishing:Germany. 2014. ISBN 978-3-659-57494-8.
