= Ahmed al Haddad =

Grand Mufti of Dubai since 2011

Ahmed al Haddad (Arabic: أحمد الحداد) has been the Grand Mufti of Dubai, United Arab Emirates since 2011. In his capacity, Haddad is a qualified religious cleric, Imam and jurist who is entitled as the country's most senior Islamic scholar. He serves as the head of Dubai's fatwa department and is primarily responsible for the regulation, edicts, and issuing all decisions concerning Islamic law and order in the emirate.

== Career ==
In 2009, Haddad declared that women reserved the authority under Islamic law to hand out and pass fatwas. According to him, "Women who have sufficient knowledge of Islamic teachings can become mufti and issue fatwas." He further went on to say that becoming a mufti always depended on knowledge, not gender, and cited in support a Quranic verse which urged those with knowledge of the law to share it. The ruling was generally in agreement with most Sunni sources and came as a response to questions raised about the validity of women as clerics.

Haddad was under attention later in 2010 when he gave out a controversial statement regarding mixed marriages in the country. According to statistical figures, the number of Emiratis (UAE nationals) marrying foreigners has risen by 10 percent in just four years. Officials blame the rising cost of dowries and wedding ceremonies as the prime reason that persuades local men to seek foreign wives, who cost much less to marry; the price of marrying native brides has risen to more than $500,000. The concept of mixed marriages is viewed by some as a risk for the demographics of the country's small and undersized local population which numbers below 1 million. Foreigners outnumber locals in Dubai by about nine to one and inter-ethnic marriages have grown accordingly; according to the Dubai Statistics Centre, almost one in three marriages in 2010 were conducted with foreign partners. In response to the changing patterns, Haddad called for a curb on marriages between locals and foreigners saying that while choosing a partner in Islam was a personal freedom, those freedoms could be "restricted for the benefit of the public interest." The proposals were not welcomed by some and were highly criticised, especially given that a number of the country's royals had foreign wives.
