= Mehmed Fatih Çıtlak =

Islamic scholar (born 1966)

Personal life
- Born: 1966 (age 59–60) Fatih, Istanbul, Turkey
- Main interest: Sufism
- Education: Marmara University
- Website: mehmetfatihcitlak.com

Religious life
- Religion: Islam
- Denomination: Sunni
- Jurisprudence: Hanafi
- Creed: Maturidi

Mehmed Fatih Çıtlak (born 1966 in Istanbul) is a composer and writer. He completed his secondary education at Fatih Imam Hatip High School in Istanbul.

While studying at Marmara University’s Department of Turkology, he studied Arabic and Islamic sciences. He wrote many books on Islam and Sufism. Çıtlak received his spiritual education from the masters with whom he attended lectures and conversation circles. He is the head of the dervishes of the Istanbul Historical Turkish Music Ensemble affiliated with the Turkish Ministry of Culture.

Çıtlak has taken part in many media productions on Sufism and Islamic history on private radio stations for many years. He has performed the duties of music director, art consultant and copywriter in many domestic and foreign audio and visual productions. He continues his radio and television programs. Mehmed Fatih Çıtlak gave talks on tafsir, sīrah and mysticism in private conversation circles by making use of the important works of Islamic civilization. He also participates as a speaker in many conferences, symposiums and panels on the subject of mysticism.

Masnavi talks at Yunus Emre Cultural Center, especially organized by the Pendik Municipality was the cultural event with the highest participation and the longest duration organized by local governments in the history of the Republic of Turkey. Mehmet Fatih Çıtlak participated in Ottoman Turkish and calligraphy classes at the Istanbul Science, Art, Education and Culture Association based in Sümbül Efendi. He writes in the journal Keşkul, which he founded, in addition to his contributions in many academic studies.

Çıtlak is married, has three daughters and one son.
