= Nexhat Ibrahimi =

Albanian Islamic teacher and Professor

- Title: Effendi

Personal life
- Born: June 10, 1959 (age 67) Dragash, AR Kosovo and Metohija, FPR Yugoslavia
- Home town: Prizren
- Citizenship: Kosovar
- Main interest(s): Fiqh, Aqidah, Islamic Studies
- Education: University of Sarajevo
- Occupation: professor

Religious life
- Religion: Islam
- Denomination: Sunni
- Jurisprudence: Hanafi
- Creed: Maturidi

Muslim leader
- Post: Representative of BIK in ICY,
- Period in office: 1991–1992

Nexhat Ibrahimi (born June 10, 1959) is an Albanian Islamic teacher, professor, alim and author from Kosovo. He is known for his writings on Islamic topics.

== Early life and education ==
Nexhat Ibrahimi was born on June 10, 1959, in the village of Zgatar, Opojë, near Prizren. In 1971, his family moved to Prizren, where he continued his elementary education. From 1974 to 1979, he attended the "Alauddin" Medresa in Prishtina. In 1980, he enrolled at the Faculty of Islamic Sciences in Sarajevo, graduating in 1984. During his studies, he was arrested on December 3, 1981, on charges of irredentism and nationalism and was imprisoned for 63 days in Sarajevo's Central Prison.

== Later Life and career ==
After completing his military service in Croatia (1985–1986), Ibrahimi began working at the Islamic Community in Prizren in 1987. He held various positions, including membership in the Assembly of the Association of Ulema in Prishtina and the Presidency of the Islamic Community of Yugoslavia in Sarajevo. On December 14, 1992, he was arrested for alleged political activities in the "affair of the imams" and sentenced to eight years in prison. He served time in Prizren, Dubrava, and Zaječar prisons before being released on December 15, 1999. He resumed his work at the Islamic Community in Prizren in 2000 and later became a teacher at the Medresa in Prizren in 2008. He also participated in various academic conferences and contributed to several Islamic publications.

== Personal life ==
Ibrahimi lives in Prizren with his family. He is married and has three children.

== Works ==
Ibrahimi has authored 36 original works and translated over 80 books on Islamic topics. He has written and translated hundreds of articles for various newspapers and magazines, including Edukata Islame and Dituria Islame in Prishtina. He has also managed the publishing library Mendimi Islam and overseen several Islamic websites.

His famous works include:

- Kontaktet e para të Islamit me popujt ballkanikë në periudhën paraosmane, Shkup, 1997
- Shkolla juridike hanefite dhe karakteristikat themelore të doktrinës së saj, Shkup, 1998
- Islami në trojet iliro-shqiptare gjatë shekujve, Shkup, 1998
- Islami dhe muslimanët në tokat shqiptare dhe në Ballkanin mesjetar (shek. IX-XIV), Shkup, 2003

== See also ==
- Islamic Community of Kosovo
- Islam in Kosovo
- Albanian Sunni Muslims
