= Syed Shujaat Ali Qadri =

First Grand Mufti of Pakistan (1941–1993)

- Born: Syed Shujaat Ali; January 1941; Uttar Pradesh, India
- Died: 27 January 1993 (aged 51–52); Jakarta, Indonesia
- Occupation: Islamic Scholar

Philosophical work
- Region: Pakistan
- School: Sunni, Hanafi
- Main interests: Fiqh, Islamic Philosophy, Hadith
- Notable ideas: Efforts to unite the ulema of Ahl as-Sunnah wa’l-Jamā‘ah in Pakistan

Syed Shuja’at Ali Qadri (Urdu: حضرت علامہ مفتی سید شجاعت علی قادری) (January 1941 – 27 January 1993) was the first Grand Mufti of Pakistan, judge of Federal Shariat Court, a member of the Pakistani Council of Islamic Ideology, and a scholar of Islamic Sciences and modern science. He was influenced by Mustafa Raza Khan Qadri.

He held various offices, authored books on Islamic fiqh, economics and inheritance, and also translated books from Arabic into Urdu.

== Birth and family ==
Shujaat Ali Qadri was born in Uttar Pradesh, India, in January 1941. He was the son of Syed Masood Ali Qadri, who served in the office of Afta (Islamic jurisprudence) at the Jamia Islamia Anwar-ul-Uloom, a madrasah in Multan, Punjab (Pakistan). Qadri was the second eldest child of his father; his brothers are:

- Syed Saadat Ali Qadri
- Syed Tariq Ali
- Syed Khushnood Ali
- Syed Shafaat Ali

Qadri was the father of three sons and a daughter.

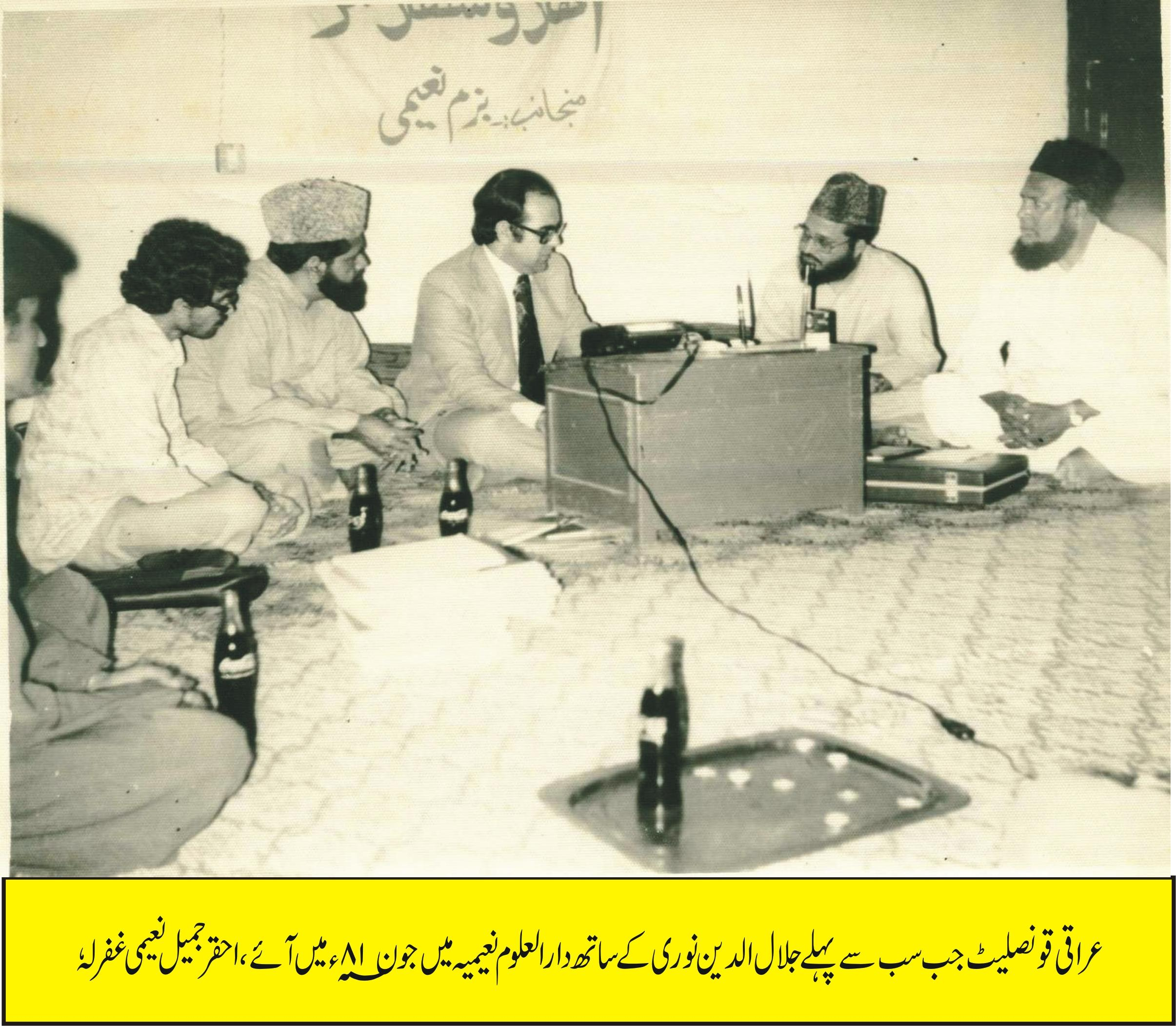
Visit of Iraqi Council General Jalal ud Din Noori at Darul ulum Naeemia, June 1981

== Education ==
Qadri got his initial education from Madrasa-e-Arabia Hafizia Saadiya, District Dadu, Aligarh. He learned the Quran from Ghulam Rabbani and Shah Ahmad Noorani Siddiqi. He then, at the age of 10, migrated with his parents in 1951 to Multan, Pakistan, and began his education in Madersah Anwar-ul-Ulum and eventually completed his Dars-i Nizami from this institute. He also received Ijaza or authority in the Qadri tariqa of Sufism from Pir Kifayat Ali Shah. He graduated from the Jamia Islamia Anwar-ul-Uloom, Multan, at the age of eighteen. Besides this he achieved the following qualifications:

- M.A Islamiyat, University of Karachi, 1971
- M.A Arabi, University of Karachi, 1974
- Course on Arabic Literature, University of Riyadh, Saudi Arabia, 1984
- PhD, University of Karachi, 1984

== Didactic services ==
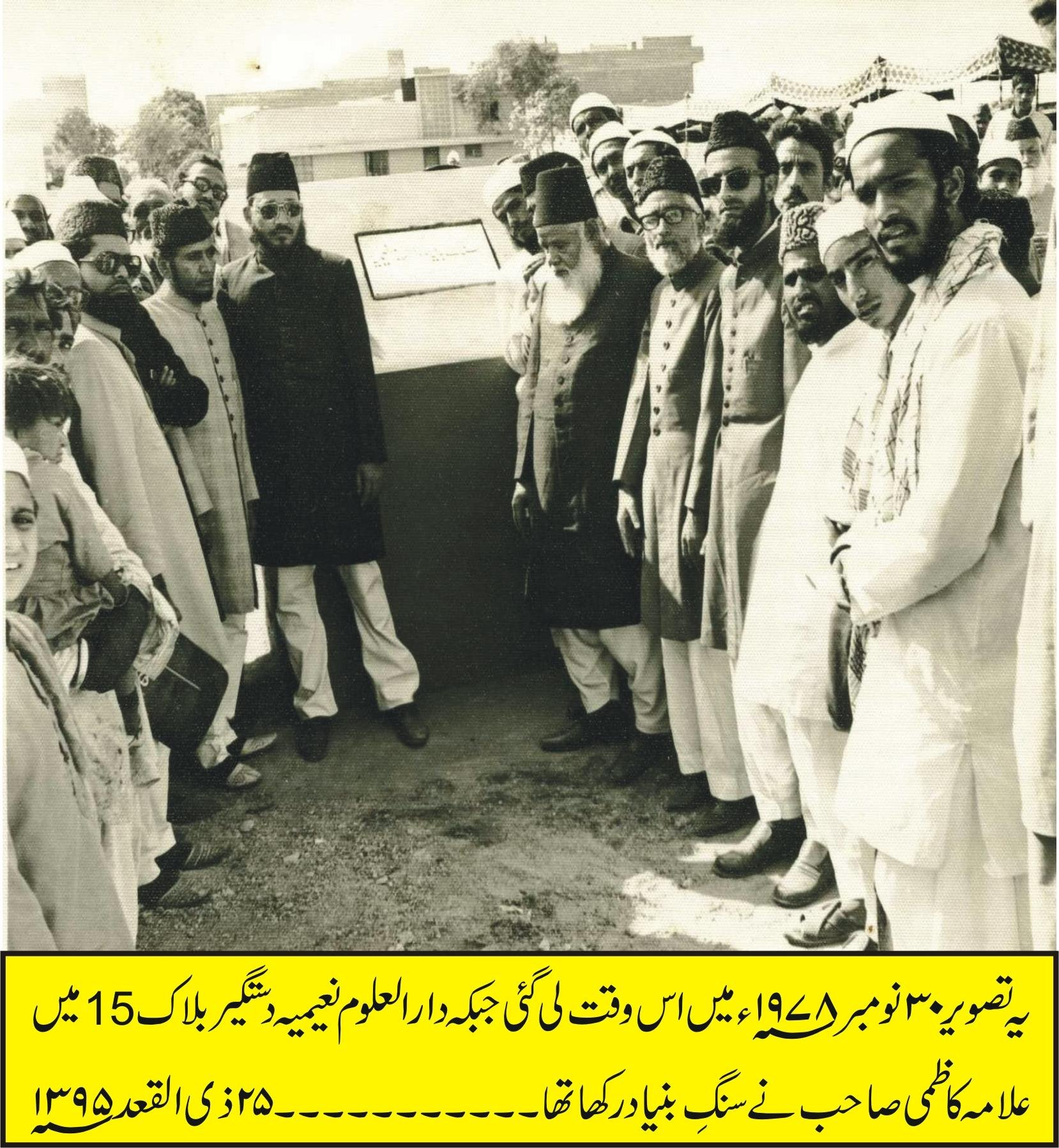
Justice Syed Shujaat Ali Qadri at the foundation stone laying ceremony of Darul ulum Naeemia

Qadri worked as a teacher and mufti in different institutes or madaris of Muslims. He served as the Head of Department and Mufti in Darul Uloom Amjadiya from 1960 to 1973. Thereafter he established Darul Uloom Naeemia. Thereafter, from 1973 till his death, he held the offices of Sheikh ul Hadith and Mufti in Darul Uloom Naeemia, Karachi. Qadri also served as a lecturer in Liaqat Government College, Karachi, for 12 years and as a member of University of Karachi Syndicate for two years.

== Ranks and offices held ==
Besides serving the offices of Sheikh-ul-Hadith and Afta at Darul Ulum Naeemia, for ten years, from 1973 to 1983; he remained as a judge of Federal Shariat Court, Pakistan for six years from 1983 till 1989. He was appointed as Aalim Judge of the Federal Shariat Court on 2 July 1983 and performed his duties till 1 July 1989. He also served as a member of Council of Islamic Ideology, Pakistan and as a member of the Karachi University Syndicate.

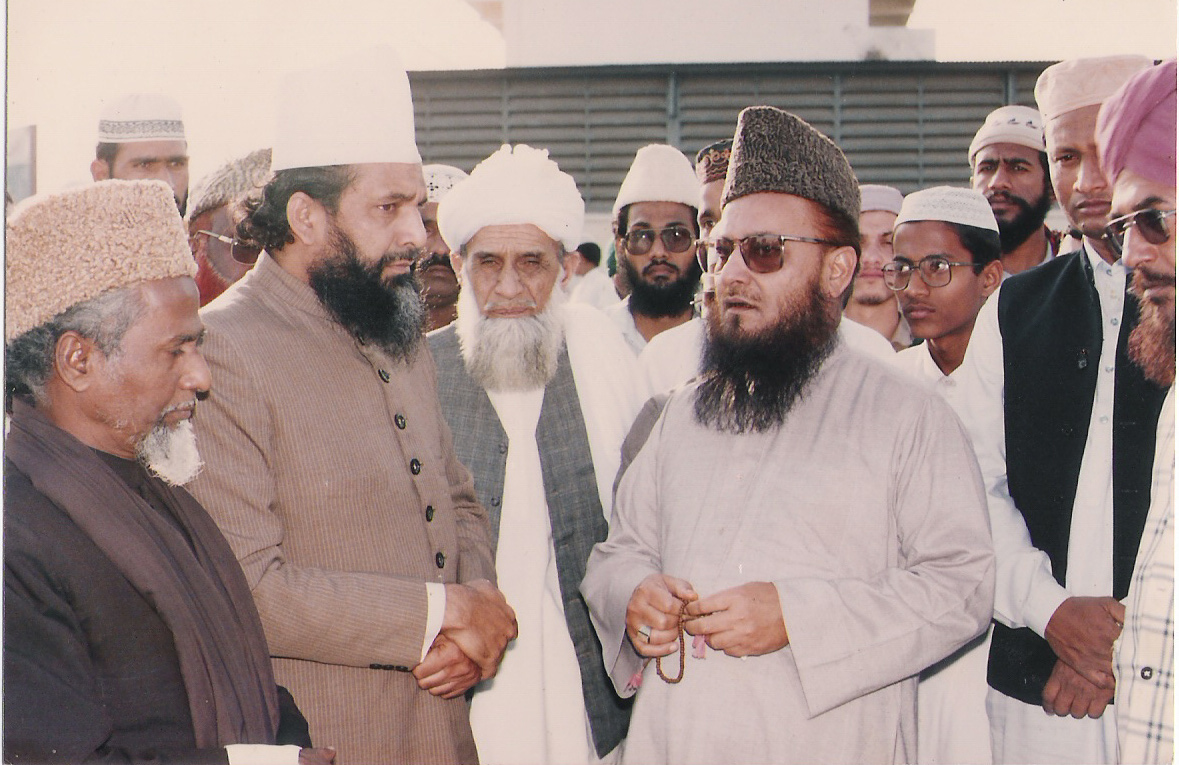
Prominent Sunni scholars waiting for the arrival of coffin of Syed Shujaat Ali Qadri, February 1993.

== Books, texts and translations ==
His scholarship includes:

- Translation of Tafseere Mazhari (fifteen sections)
- Translation of Mowahib-al-Luduniya
- Translation of Sharah-as-Sadur
- Translation of Al-Khairat-al-Hissan
- Translation of Al-Shifae Sheikh Al-Raees (some parts)
- Insha-al-Arabiya (four parts)
- Translation of Khatme Nabuwat Magazine from Arabic to Urdu
- Magazine on Khatme Nabuwat in Arabi
1. Islam mein Murtid ki Saza (Punishment of an apostate in Islam)
- Islam ka Maashi Nizam (Islamic Economic System)
- Aqaid o Aamal (Beliefs and Actions)
- Teen Talaqain (Three divorces)
- Translation and Commentary of Surah Bani Israeel with a biography of the Blessed Prophet Sallalahu Alihay Wassalam
- Fiqahe Ahle Sunnat (Jurisprudence of Ahle Sunnat)
- Adalate Islamia (Islamic Court)
- Man huwa Ahmed Raza? (Who is Ahmed Raza?) – A biography of Aala Hazrat Imam Ahmed Raza Khan, in Arabic Language
- Mujaddid-al-Mata – Some articles on Aala Hazrat Imam Ahmed Raza Khan, in Arabic Language
- Fatawae Rizwiya (Translation of Arabic terms)
- Rasail-e-Aala Hazrat (Collection of booklets written by Aala Hazrat Imam Ahmed Raza Khan with explanatory footnotes, introductions and translation of Arabic and Persion texts)
- Arbaeen
- Composition of the last part of Bahare Shariat (Fiqh Ahle Sunnat, foreword, Madina Publishing, Karachi)
- Phd Thesis – An Academic Movement in Arabic Language-Valley of Sindh in Twelfth-Thirteenth A.D
- Series of articles on the history of Islam, published in the monthly magazine Tarjumaan-e-AhleSunnat (Voice of Ahle Sunnat)

== Critical acclaim ==
Shujaat was a prominent scholar of the Barelvi Movement and was respected by the scholars of major sects of Islam and the people of Pakistan.

== Death ==
On 24 January 1993 Qadri went on an official tour of Indonesia with a delegation of the Ministry of Population Control. It was during this tour that on the fourth Shabaan 1413 Hijri, 27 January 1993 he died of a heart attack in Jakarta. Qadri's funeral procession was led by Hamid Saeed Kazmi, who was at that time the MNA of JUP, in Jakarta. It was estimated that approximately fifty thousand people attended the procession along with the ambassadors and religious scholars from Islamic countries, Indonesian officials, and Pakistan's foreign delegation in Indonesia. His body was brought back to Pakistan on 1 February 1993, by Singapore Airlines, where he was buried in Darul Uloom Naeemia, Karachi. Qadri's funeral procession, in Karachi, was led by his brother, Syed Saadat Ali Qadri, in the presence of a large number of people, journalists, politicians, and scholars from all schools of thought. An estimated crowd of fifteen thousand attended his funeral procession. His tomb is located inside the Daru Uloom Naeemia.

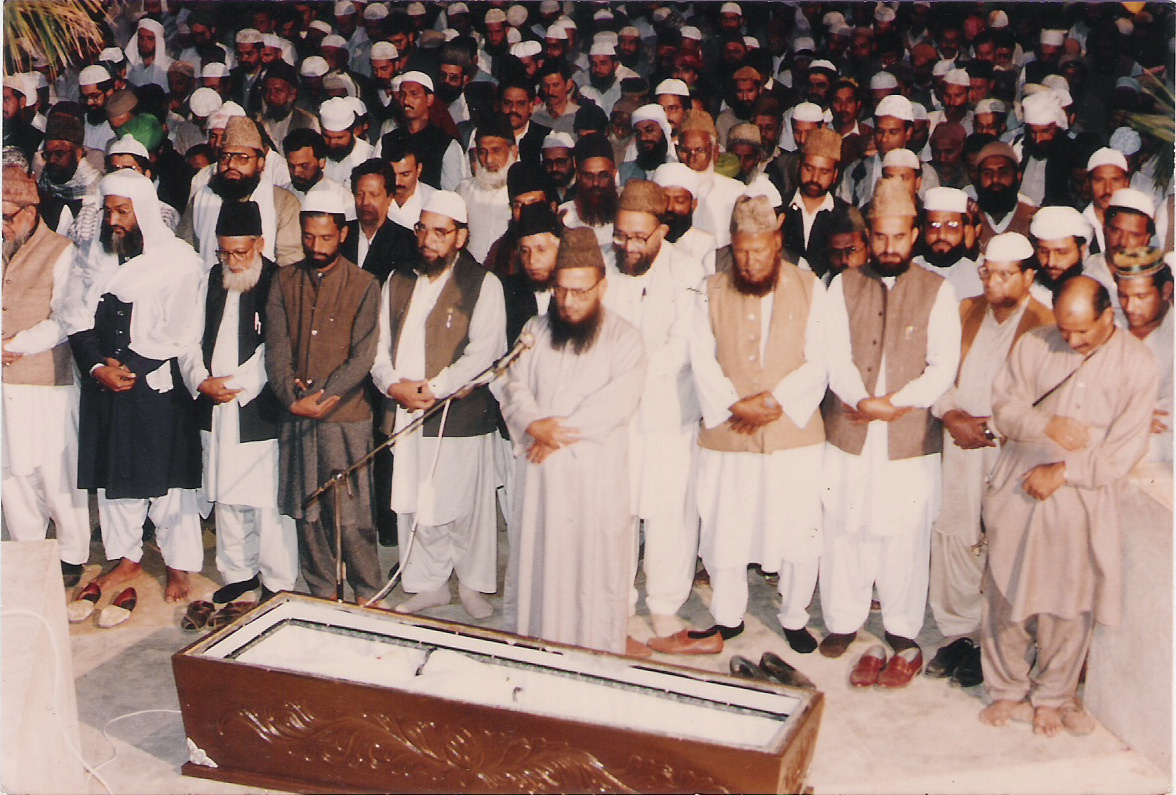
Funeral procession of Justice Mufti Syed Shujaat Ali Qadri led by Sa'adat Ali Qadri.

== Condolences ==
Syed Shujaat Ali Qadri's death was termed as a national tragedy and a great loss of an eminent religious scholar of Islam for the people of Pakistan. Former Prime Minister of Pakistan, Muhammad Nawaz Sharif, expressed his shock and grief over Qadri's death in the following manner:

Mufti Syed Shujaat Ali Qadri was a devout Muslim, with a kind heart.

Former Prime Minister of Pakistan and the opposition leader in the National Assembly of Pakistan at that time, Benazir Bhutto, expressed her deep sorrow and grief over his demise:

Mufti Syed Shujaat Ali Qadri was a great scholar who passed his entire life in preaching Islam and betterment of the Ummah.

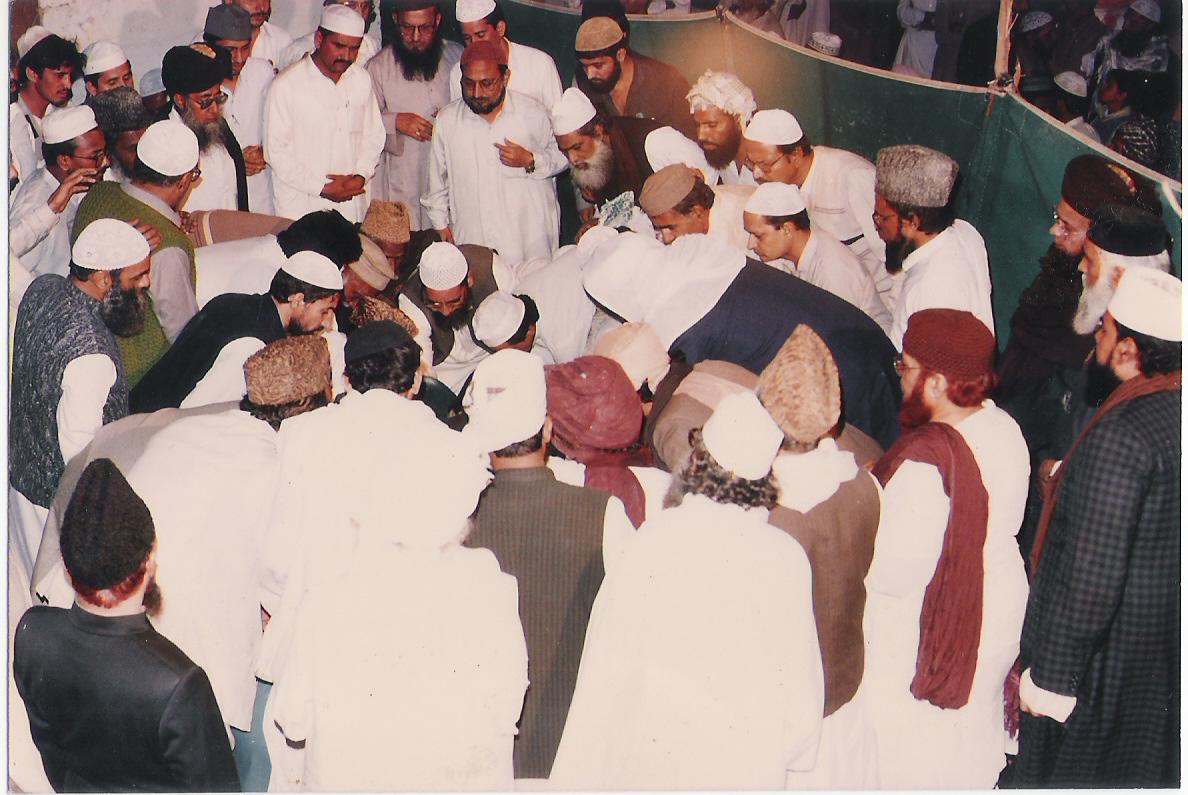
Burial inside Darul Ulum Naeemia.

The then Federal Minister for Religious Affairs, Abdul Sattar Khan Niazi expressed his condolences and said:

The country has lost a great scholar who rendered invaluable services for the cause of Islam. May Allah Almighty rest the departed soul and grant courage to the bereaved family to bear this irreparable loss.

Ahmed Noorani Siddiqui visited Qadri's home to offer his condolences to Qadri's family:

Mufti Syed Shujaat Ali Qadri was an adept cleric, scholar, and an excellent teacher. The people of Ahle Sunnah can never dis-remember his valuable services.

== See also ==
- Madrassas in Pakistan
- Ahmad Saeed Kazmi
- Hanafi
- Mufti
