= Zailan Moris =

Malaysian scholar of Islamic philosophy

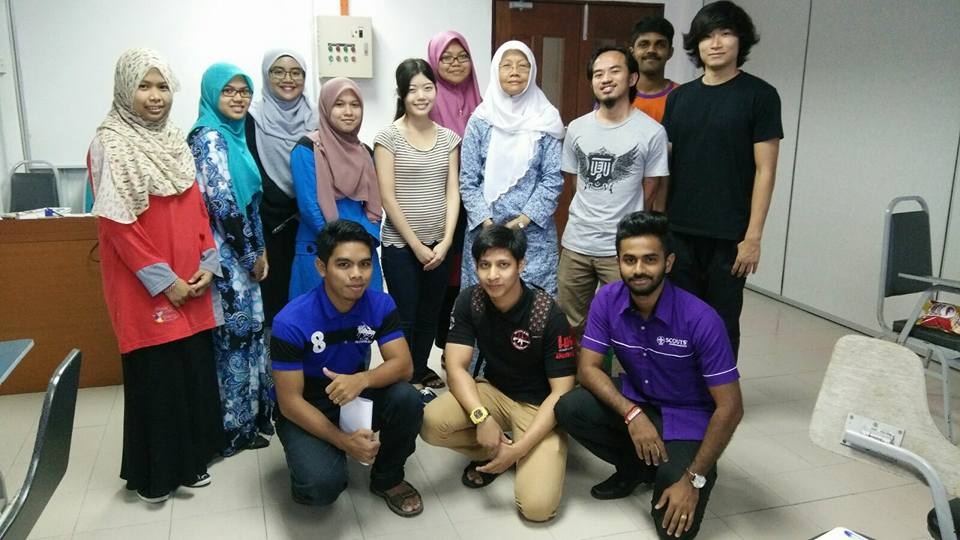
- Moris (white scarf in the middle) in 2015 with her students at Universiti Sains Malaysia
- Born: Zailan Moris

Academic background
- Education: University Sains Malaysia, Carleton University, The American University
- Influences: Seyyed Hossein Nasr

Academic work
- Institutions: University Sains Malaysia
- Notable works: Revelation, intellectual intuition and reason in the philosophy of Mulla Sadra : an analysis of the al-Hikmah al-arshiyyah (2013)

Zailan Moris is a Malaysian scholar of Islamic philosophy and former professor of the School of Humanities at the University Sains Malaysia. Her main interests are Islamic philosophy, comparative religion and Sufism.

== Biography ==
Zailan Moris graduated with a bachelor's degree from the University Sains Malaysia and completed her Master's from Carleton University in Ottawa, Canada. She became interested in Islamic philosophy after being inspired by Iranian philosopher Seyyed Hossein Nasr, and received a PhD in 1994 from the American University in Washington, DC, under his supervision. She wrote her dissertation on the philosophy of Mulla Sadra that has been published under the title Revelation, intellectual intuition and reason in the philosophy of Mulla Sadra: an analysis of the al-Hikmah al-arshiyyah. Being a devout student of Nasr, she shares many of his ideas and has discussed and commented upon different aspects of his philosophical thinking. She has helped promote the traditionalist perspective in Malaysia. Moris taught at the Department of Philosophy in the School of Humanities at the University Sains Malaysia until her retirement in 2017.

== Works ==
Moris has authored and co-authored several books and scholarly articles on different aspects of Islamic philosophy. Some of her publications include:

As author

- Al-Ghazali's Theory of happiness : an analysis of the Kimiya-yi-sa adat (1982)
- God and His Attributes: Lessons on Islamic Doctrine (Foundations of Islamic Doctrine) (1989)
- The Islamisation of the Malays : a philosophical analysis of Bahr Al-Lahut : a 12th-century Islamic metaphysical manuscript (2010)
- Revelation, intellectual intuition and reason in the philosophy of Mulla Sadra : an analysis of the al-Hikmah al-arshiyyah (2013)

As editor

- Knowledge is light : essays in Islamic studies presented to Seyyed Hossein Nasr by his students in honor of his sixty-sixth birthday (1999)
- Higher Education in the Asia Pacific: Emerging Trends in Teaching and Learning (2008)

== See also ==
- Haifaa Jawad
