= Nuhu G. Obaje =

Prof. Nuhu George Obaje

Head, NNPC professorial chair at IBBU Lapai, in Niger State.
- Incumbent
- Assumed office October 2019
- Preceded by: Pioneer

Personal details
- Born: December 15, 1961 (age 64) Ajaka village, Igalamela-Odolu, Kogi State Nigeria
- Education: University of Tuebingen; Ahmadu Bello University
- Occupation: Geologist, Academic

Professor Nuhu George Obaje (born 15 December 1961 and died 6 November 2024) was a professor and Director in the Centre for Applied Sciences and Technology Research (CASTER) at the Ibrahim Badamasi Babangida University Lapai, Niger State.

== Biography ==
Born and raised in Ajaka village in Igalamela local government area of Kogi state. In 1974, he attended Barewa College Zaria for his senior school leaving certificate and graduated in 1979. After-which he proceeded to study Geology at the Ahmadu Bello University Zaria graduating in 1984. By 1987, he received his M.Sc. degree and furthered for his PhD in 1994 at University of Tuebingen, Germany.

Professor Obaje was in 2019, appointed as pioneer head of the Nigerian National Petroleum Corporation (NNPC) professorial chair at Ibrahim Badamasi Babangida University Lapai (IBBUL), in Niger state. Prior, he had advocated the prospecting of oil in the seven hydrocarbon basins including Sokoto and Bida. Consequently, he was made the NNPC Chair in Basinal Studies.

== Awards and recognition ==
Awards:

- Royal Society of London (RSL) post-doctoral fellowship in Petroleum Geochemistry at the University of Aberdeen, Scotland, in 1997
- The German Academic Exchange Service (GAES) postdoctoral fellowship in biostratigraphy at the University of Tuebingen, in 1998.
- The Alexander von Humboldt research fellowship in organic geochemistry/organic petrology at the Federal Institute for Geosciences and Natural Resources in Hannover/Germany, on two separate occasions.
- Senior Research Fellow of the Alfried Krupp Foundation
- Assessor, Petroleum Technology Development Fund (PTDF) annual research grants competition programme

== Publications ==
Some publications by Obaje include:

- Geology and mineral resources of Nigeria, NG Obaje, Springer, 2009
- Hydrocarbon prospectivity of Nigeria's inland basins: From the viewpoint of organic geochemistry and organic petrology, NG Obaje, H Wehner, G Scheeder, MB Abubakar, A Jauro AAPG bulletin 88 (3), 325-353, 2004
- Petrographic composition and depositional environments of Cretaceous coals and coal measures in the Middle Benue Trough of Nigeria, NG Obaje, B Ligouis, SI Abaa International journal of coal geology 26 (3-4),233-260, 1994
- Coal petrography, microfossils and paleo environments of Cretaceous coal measures in the Middle Benue Trough of Nigeria, NG Obaje, Institut und Museum für Geologie und Paläontologie der Universität, 1994
- Geochemical evaluation of the hydro carbon prospects of sedimentary basins in Northern Nigeria, NG Obaje, DO Attah, SA Opeloye, A Moumouni Geochemical Journal 40 (3), 227-243, 2006
- Biostratigraphic and geochemical controls of hydrocarbon prospects in the Benue Trough and Anambra Basin, Nigeria, NG Obaje, Nigerian Association of Petroleum Explorationists (NAPE) Bulletin 14, 18-54, 1999
- Liquid hydrocarbon source-rock potential of mid-Cretaceous coals and coal measures in the Middle Benue Trough of Nigeria, NG Obaje, H Hamza, international Journal of Earth Sciences: Geologische Rundschau 89 (1), 130, 2000
- Description of soft-sediment deformation structures in the Cretaceous Bima Sandstone from the Yola Arm, Upper Benue Trough north-eastern Nigeria, NK Samaila, MB Abubakar, EFC Dike, NG Obaje Journal of African Earth Sciences 44 (1), 66-74, 2006
- Organic geochemistry of Cretaceous Lamza and Chikila coals, upper Benue trough, Nigeria, A Jauro, NG Obaje, MO Agho, MB Abubakar, A Tukur Fuel 86 (4), 520-532, 2007
- Onocerane and other triterpenoids in Late Cretaceous sediments from the Upper Benue Trough, Nigeria: tectonic and palaeo environmental implications, MJ Pearson, NG Obaje Organic Geochemistry 30 (7), 583-592, 1999
- A report on the occurrence of Albian-Cenomanian elater-bearing pollen in Nasara-1 well, Upper Benue Trough, Nigeria: Biostratigraphic and palaeo climatological implications, MB Abubakar, NG Obaje, HP Luterbacher, EFC, Dike, AR Ashraf, Journal of African Earth Sciences 45 (3), 347-354, 2 06
- New geochemical data from the Nigerian sector of the Chad basin: implications on hydro carbon prospectivity, NG Obaje, H Wehner, H Hamza, G Scheeder, Journal of African Earth Sciences 38 (5), 477-487, 2004
- Stratigraphic evolution and petroleum potential of middle cretaceous sediments in the lower and middle Benue Trough, Nigeria: insights from new source rock facies evaluation, SO Akande, OJ Ojo, OA Adekeye, SO Egenhoff, NG Obaje, BD Erdtmann Petroleum Technology Development Journal: An International Journal 1, 1-34, 2011
- Petroleum prospectivity of Cretaceous Formations in the Gongola Basin, Upper Benue Trough, Nigeria: an organic geochemical perspective on a migrated oil controversy, MB Abubakar, EFC Dike, NG Obaje, H Wehner, A Jauro, Journal of Petroleum Geology 31 (4), 387-407, 2008
- Nasara‐I well, Gongola Basin (Upper Benue Trough, Nigeria): Source‐rock evaluation, NG Obaje, H Wehner, MB Abubakar, MT Isah, Journal of Petroleum Geology 27 (2), 191-206, 2004
- POTENTIAL FOR COAL‐DERIVED GASEOUS/HYDROCARBONS IN THE MIDDLE BENUE/TROUGH OF NIGERIA, NG Obaje, SI Abaa, Journal of Petroleum Geology 19 (1), 77-94, 1996
- Hydrocarbon potential of Cretaceous sediments in the Lower and Middle Benue Trough, Nigeria: Insights from new source rock facies evaluation, SO Akande, SO Egenhoff, NG Obaje, OJ Ojo, OA Adekeye, BD Erdtmann, Journal of African Earth Sciences 64, 34-47, 2012
- Economic geology of Nigerian coal resources-a/brief review, NG Obaje, SI Abaa, T Najime, CE Suh, Africa Geo science Review 6, 71-82, 1999
- The Bida Basin in north-central Nigeria: sedimentology and petroleum geology, NG Obaje, MK Musa, AN Odoma, H Hamza, Journal of Petroleum and Gas Exploration Research 1 (1), 001-013, 2011
- Environmental Impact of Artesanal Mining of Barytes in Azara Area, Middle Benue Trough, Nigeria MS Chaanda, NG Obaje, A Moumouni, NG Goki, UA Lar Journal of Earth Sciences 4 (1), 38-42, 2010.
