= Shamil Alyautdinov =

Imam of Moscow

- Шамиль Аляутдинов
- Born: January 20, 1974 (age 52); Moscow, RSFSR, USSR
- Occupations: Author, Imam
- Writing career
- Genre: Religion. Theology
- Website: www.umma.ru

Shamil Alyautdinov (Tatar: Шамиль Аляутдинов) (born 20 January 1974) is an imam of Moscow's Memorial Mosque on Poklonnaya Hill. He is a graduate of Al Azhar University. He is serving as a deputy mufti on the Clerical Muslim Board for the European part of the Russian Federation. He is considered one of the most influential Islamic scholars in Russian speaking world. His website umma.ru is the most popular Islamic website in Russian speaking world (over 1 mln views per month).
