= Mevlud Sinani =

Kosovar politician

Mevlud Sinani is a Kosovar Albanian politician, currently serving as deputy minister of communities and returns of the Republic of Kosovo.
