= Muhammad Ayaz Niazi =

Afghan Islamic scholar and Imam (1964–2020)

Muhammad Ayaz Niazi (محمد ایاز نیازی)
- دکتور محمد ایاز نیازی

Personal life
- Born: 1964 Yamgan
- Died: 2 June 2020 (aged 55–56) Kabul
- Cause of death: Assassination
- Education: Al-Azhar University; Darul Qurra Peshawar

Religious life
- Religion: Islam
- Institute: Kabul University
- Profession: Islamic scholar khatib university teacher

Muhammad Ayaz Niazi (born; 1964 - 2 June 2020) (مولانا ډاکټر محمد ایاز نیازی) was an Afghan Islamic scholar, Khatib and Imam.

He was a professor of Islamic Law at Kabul University and Khatib at Wazir Akbar Khan Mosque.

== Death ==
Niazi was killed on 2 June 2020 with three others in a bomb blast at Masjid Wazir Akbar Khan.
