= Sheikh Musa Drammeh =

- Born: Musa Drammeh; February 1, 1962 (age 64); Ndrammeh Joka, The Gambia and raised in Keur Matar Fatou, Senegal.
- Citizenship: American
- Occupations: Imam, educator, community organizer
- Years active: 1980s-present
- Website: www.nationalhealthequity.org/

Sheikh Musa Drammeh (born February 1, 1962, in Ndrammeh Joka, Gambia.) is a Gambian born Muslim cleric, educator, and community leader based in New York City, United States. He is associated with Islamic educational initiatives and community programs within African immigrant communities in the Bronx. Drammeh has also participated in interfaith dialogue activities involving Muslim, Jewish, and Christian organizations.

== Early life and education ==
Musa Drammeh was born in The Gambia, where he received his early Islamic education through traditional Qur’anic instruction. His studies included Qur’anic recitation and foundational Islamic sciences. He later continued religious learning while preparing for community leadership roles.

In the mid-1980s, Drammeh migrated to the United States and settled in New York City, where he became involved in religious and educational activities within local Muslim communities.

== Career ==
After relocating to New York, Drammeh became active in community-based religious leadership in the Bronx, particularly among West African immigrant communities. He later served as an imam and educator at the Islamic Cultural Center of North America, an institution providing religious instruction alongside youth and community programs.

His work has included teaching Islamic studies, organizing community programs, and supporting social and educational initiatives for immigrant families. These activities have focused on cultural integration, youth mentorship, and community development.

== Interfaith activities ==
Drammeh has participated in interfaith dialogue initiatives aimed at strengthening cooperation between religious communities in New York City. His involvement has included public discussions and collaborative community events addressing religious coexistence and social cohesion.

In 2025, he was reported to have participated in a delegation of Muslim leaders visiting Israel as part of interreligious engagement efforts.

== Community engagement ==
In addition to religious leadership, Drammeh has spoken on issues affecting immigrant communities, including education, social integration, and religious understanding. His work has largely centered on grassroots community programs within the African diaspora in New York City.
