= Haifaa Jawad =

Iraqi Muslim scholar

- Born: Haifaa Jawad

Academic background
- Education: University of Baghdad, University of Exeter

Academic work
- Institutions: University of Birmingham
- Notable works: The Rights of Women in Islam: An Authentic Approach; Women, Islam, and Resistance in the Arab World

Haifaa Jawad is an Iraqi Muslim scholar and Honorary Senior Lecturer of theology and religion at the University of Birmingham.

== Biography ==
Haifaa Jawad received her BA and MA degrees from Baghdad University and her PhD from the University of Exeter. She has held academic positions at various institutions including Westhill College (1993-1999), New England College (American University) (1990-1993), Trinity College, Dublin and University of Alabama. Since 2001, she has been a member of the Department of Theology and Religion at the University of Birmingham.

== Works ==
- The Rights of Women in Islam: An Authentic Approach (St. Martin's Press, 1998)
- Muslim Women and Sport (Routledge, 2010) (ed) with Gertrude Pfister and Tansin Benn
- Towards Building a British Islam: New Muslims' Perspectives (Continuum, 2011)
- Women, Islam, and Resistance in the Arab World (Lynne Rienner, 2013) with Maria Holt
- A Muslim Response to the Christian Theology of Religions (Brill, 2016)

== See also ==
- Zailan Moris
