= Aqeel Turabi =

Pakistani Islamic scholar

Aqeel Turabi, also known as Allama Aqeel Turabi (1934 - 2009), was a leading Pakistani Islamic scholar and orator. He was a member of the Council of Islamic Ideology from 2000 until 2006.

== Early life ==
Turabi was born in Hyderabad state, in British India. His father Allama Rasheed Turabi was a noted religious scholar, poet, and orator.

Aqeel Turabi received his early religious education from his parents who were keen to see one of their children becoming a religious scholar. After the partition, he moved to Karachi with his parents.

From 1952 to 1962, he received religious education in Hawza 'Ilmiyya Qom, Iran, where he studied under the personal patronage of the Grand Mujtahid Ayatullah Borujerdi. He spent more than a decade in religious seminaries in Qom and later in Najaf; during this period he acquired fluency in Persian and Arabic language. He received more than 13 Ijazahs from Iranian and Iraqi academies of: Ayatollah Mohammad Kazem Shariatmadari; Ayatollah Sheikh Abdun Nabi Iraqi; Ayatollah Imam Khomeini, Leader of the Islamic revolution in Iran; Shahab ud-Din Mar’ashi Najafi; Ayatollah Uzma Muhsin al-Hakim; Ayatollah Uzma Syed Abu al-Qasim al-Khoei; Ayatollah Sahib Zarya; Ayatollah Syed Abdullah Shirazee; Ayatollah Syed Jamal Hashmi; Ayatollah Syed Faani Ispahani; Ayatollah Muhammad Sharizi of Karbala; Ayatollah Hasan Qasmi; Ayatollah Syed Mohammad Shirazee; and Ayatollah Syed Muhammad Roohani.

In 1966, he was appointed and went to England as a representative of Grand Mujtahid Ayatollah Hakeem.

== Return to Pakistan ==
In 1970, on his father's advice, he returned to Pakistan. After his father's demise in 1973, Turabi assumed all his religious responsibilities; he addressed Muharram majlis at Nishtar Park, Karachi for a few years, Started addressing Sham-e-Ghariba majlis, aired on Radio Pakistan, at Hussainia Sajjadia, Karachi, and continued to do so for more than 30 years. Addressed Muharram majlis at Khaliqdinna Hall, Karachi continued to do so until the late 1980s.

He visited many countries to Address Majalis and deliver lectures including in the United Kingdom, the United States, the Middle East, and several countries in Africa.

He propagated Sunni-Shia unity through majalis and presented religious teachings in the light of contemporary politics and philosophy.

He was a founding member and convener of the Imamia Council of Pakistan when it was formed on 25 February 1982 in Lahore. The organization was active for a few years to protect and highlight issues pertaining to the rights of Fiqh Jaffariya.

Turabi promoted friendly ties between the people of Pakistan and Iran. After the revolution, he visited Iran several times in various capacities. His last visit to Iran was in 2006 when he led an official delegation of the Council of Islamic Ideology to Iran and Qatar.

During the 1980s, he was active in the political party ‘Tahrîk-i Istiqlâl” led by Air Marshall (retd.) Asghar Khan and served on the party's central committee. In later years, he left the party for personal reasons and decided to stay away from active politics.

He served as a member of the Islamic Ideology Council of Pakistan from 2000 until 2006. He was nominated member of both Provincial and Federal Zakat Councils.

He died in Karachi in April 2009.
