= Syed Adnan Kakakhail =

Pakistani Islamic scholar (born 1975)

Syed Adnan Kakakhail سید عدنان کاکاخیل
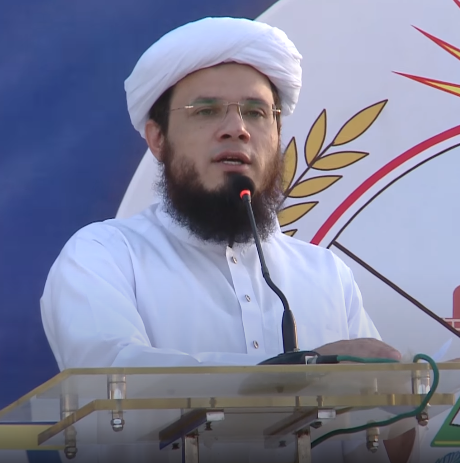
- Kakakhail at Jamia Tur Rasheed in Karachi, 2016

1st CEO of Al-Burhan Institute
- Incumbent
- Assumed office 2016
- Preceded by: Position established

Personal life
- Born: 27 September 1975 (age 51) Ziarat Kaka Sahib, North-West Frontier Province, Pakistan (Now, Khyber Pakhtunkhwa, Pakistan)
- Education: University of Karachi, Jamia Uloom-ul-Islamia, University of Peshawar
- Occupation: Mufti, author, columnist, mentor,
- Relatives: Uzair Gul Peshawari (Grandfather)
- Website: muftiadnankakakhail.com

Religious life
- Religion: Islam
- Denomination: Sunni
- Jurisprudence: Hanafi
- Movement: Deobandi

Muslim leader
- Teacher: Abdur Razzaq Iskander; Abu Lubaba Shah Mansoor

YouTube information
- Channel: Mufti Syed Adnan Kakakhail
- Years active: 2017–present
- Subscribers: 143 thousand
- Views: 10.3 million
- Last updated: 11 September 2024

Syed Adnan Kakakhail (Urdu: سید عدنان کاکاخیل; born 27 September 1975) is a Pakistani Sunni Muslim scholar, columnist and author. He is the founder and CEO of Al-Burhan Institute. He is a recipient presidential award for the "Best Debator of Pakistan".

== Career ==
He is also serving as a member of Iman Islamic Banking's Shariah Board and head of Shariah Compliance Department at Silkbank Limited. Since 2006, he has been teaching various Islamic subjects at some of the leading Islamic educational institutions in Pakistan. He has also served as the Director of the Faculty of Sharia at Jamia tur Rasheed, Karachi (which offers a four-year postgraduate degree program). He is currently a Shariah advisor to an Islamic bank. Prior to that, he was a Shariah Trainer (2008 to 2011) at Dubai Islamic Bank Pakistan Limited. He is a columnist for a weekly magazine.

Kakakhail is the founder of a Pakistani think tank called Center for Policy Research and Dialogue. In October 2016, he established Al-Burhan Institute, which has over 17 campuses in 14 cities across Pakistan.

== Reception ==
In 2017, Jamiat Ulama-e-Islam criticised Kakakhail as an agent of the military establishment for praising Imran Khan in one of his speeches.

== Literary works ==
Kakakhail's works include:

- Ḍākṭar Shāhid Masʻūd kī Muftī Taqī ʻUs̲mānī se guftugū
- Ḥudūd Ārḍīnans
- Ḥudūd tarmīmī bil kiyā hai
- Ḥuqūq-i Nisvān̲ Bil
- Protection of Women's Rights Bill.
- Ṣadr-i Pākistān Parvez Musharraf ke sāmne Maulānā ʻAdnān Kākā K̲h̲ail kā yādgār k̲h̲ut̤āb, 2007

== See also ==
- List of Deobandis
