= Abdullah Wasi'an =

Indonesian christology expert

- Born: 9 June 1917; Surabaya, Dutch East Indies
- Died: February 16, 2011 (aged 93); Surabaya, Indonesia
- Occupation: Islamic preacher
- Years active: 1936–2011
- Organization: Muhammadiyah
- Known for: Christology expert

Kyai Haji Abdullah Wasi'an (9 June 1917 – 16 February 2011) was an ustad, teacher and Christology expert from Indonesia.

Since 1936, when he was 19 years old, Wasi'an was active in organizations. He started through the Muhammadiyah Youth (Pemuda Muhammadiyah) in Surabaya. As a member of the education team, he was in charge of Taman Pustaka Pemuda Muhammadiyah, a library with a complete collection of books at that time.

He was later involved in the field of da'wah. In a short time he was appointed as the preacher of the Muhammadiyah Youth, to lecture at Muhammadiyah-owned schools and several state schools. Then, in the 1950s, Abdullah Wasi'an was appointed a member of the Muhammadiyah Surabaya Board, in the Tabligh Council.

Abdullah Wasi'an accidentally became a Christologist. At that time, Christology education was scarce; he was self-taught, rather than learning through formal education. At present Christology is taught at the Ushuluddin Faculty at the Islamic University. Abdullah Wasi'an's memorized the contents of the Bible and could understand them well.

He was fluent in English, French, German and Dutch, becoming a Christologist respected by pastors and other Christian figures. Wasi'an had a long experience of debating with many Christian priests and leaders. Wasi'an died on February 16, 2011, and was buried in his home town, Surabaya.
