= Karbogha Sharif =

Town in Khyber Pakhtunkhwa, Pakistan

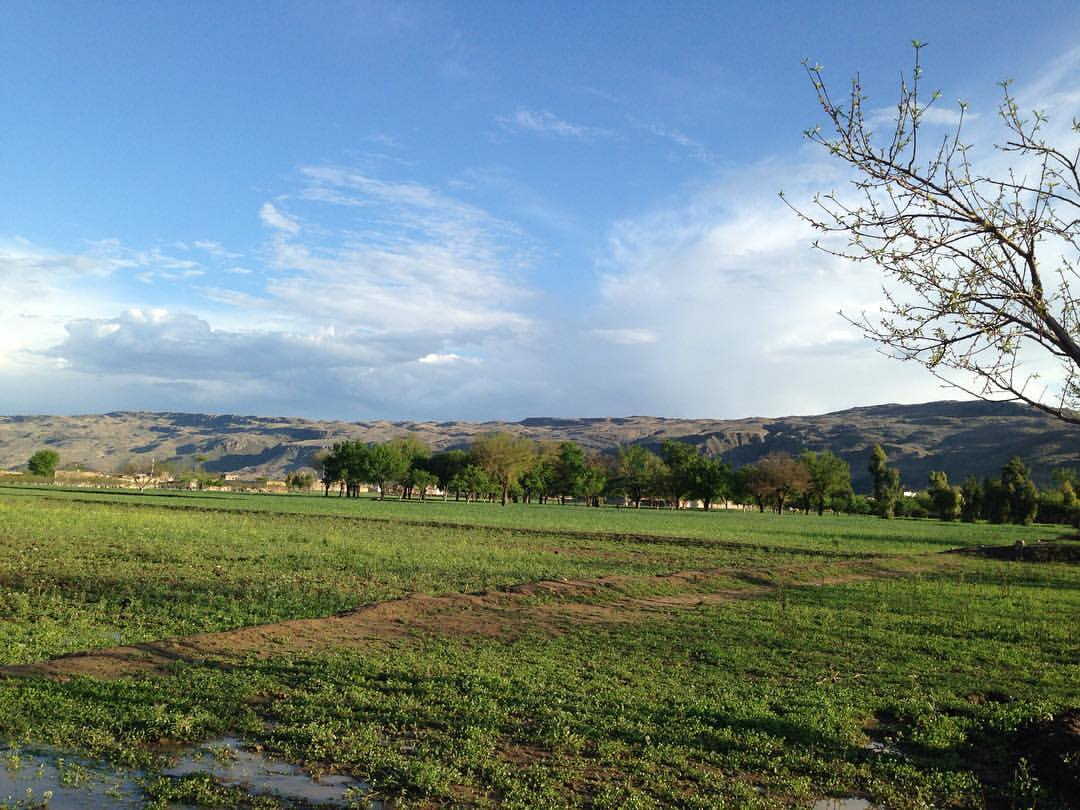
Green Color of Karbogha Sharif

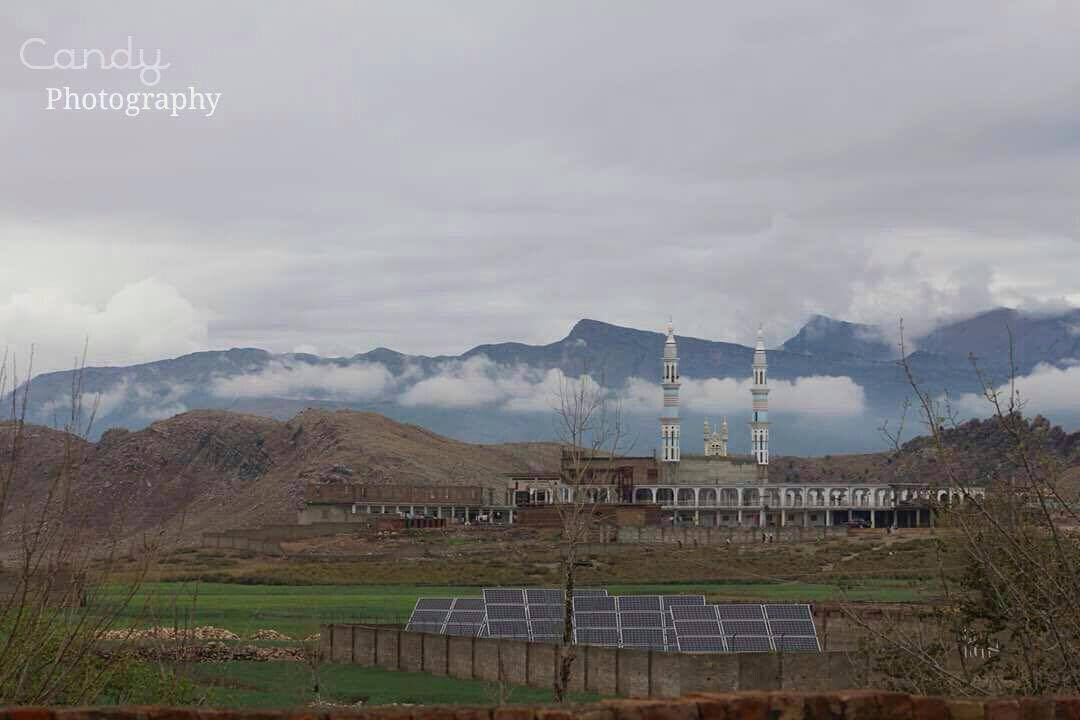
Karbogha Sharif

Karbogha Sharif is a village located in a mountainous area of Thall Tehsil, Hangu District, Khyber Pakhtunkhwa, Pakistan. It is located close to the border with Khost Province, Afghanistan. Karbogha's land lies between two opposite range of mountains called Sera and Pethow (meaning Southern and Northern mountains). The highest peak of the Southern mountains is called "Oot Sar".

The word Karbogha is derived from Kara and Bogh both words originally from the Pashto language meaning "sow" and "garden".

This village has been associated with the cultural icon of Pashtons, Khushal Khan Khattak. It's believed that the grand parents or parents of Khushal Khan Khattak migrated from Karbogha Sharif when it was a part of Teri.

Its population is about thirty four thousand, in 2773 households. But its population is usually confused with the population of union council of Karbogha Sharif, which includes neighborhoods of Darshi (Dashi: Approximately 5,000) and Matho Khel (Approximately 1,000).

The most common fruit of Karbogha is the peach. The area is famous for the production of peaches throughout Pakistan. The season of the same remains for only 20 days once a year between 20 July to 10 August.
