= Muhammad Ajaj Al-Khatib =

Islamic thinker and scholar

Muhammad Ajaj Al-Khatib (1932, Damascus - 11 October 2021) was an Islamic thinker and scholar in the science of Hadith.

== Scholarly life ==
He completed his undergraduate studies in Islamic Sharia with honors and as valedictorian in 1959 in the University of Damascus. His continued his higher studies and obtained his master's with distinction in 1962, and his thesis was on (Sunnah Before Transcription). Then, he obtained his PhD at the beginning with honors in 1966 from the University of Cairo, and his thesis was on (The Establishment of Hadith Science and Its Definition), alongside updating Ramahurmuzi's book Al-Muḥaddith al-Fāṣil bayn al-Rāwī wa al-Wāʻī.

Before continuing his higher studies, Al-Khatib finished high school in Damascus before starting university, from 1966 until 1980. He then studied in the Imam Mohammad Ibn Saud Islamic University in Riyadh, from 1966 until 1973.

Al-Khatib became a tenured professor in 1976 before teaching in Ummul Qura University in Mecca in 1979, University of United Arab Emirates from 1980 until 1997, and the University of Sharjah until 2002. He was the dean for the college of Sharia and Islamic studies, as well as a hadith and general Islamic studies professor at the University of Sharjah.

== Positions ==
- Vice dean of the faculty of Sharia at the University of Damascus and head of the department of Quran and Sunnah sciences at the University of Damascus
- Head of the department of Islamic studies at the United Arab Emirates University
- Dean of the college of Sharia and Islamic studies at the University of Sharjah
- Professor of hadith, biography and Islamic culture at Ajman University

== Publications ==
- Abu Hurairah, Narrator of Islam (1962).
- Sunnah Before Its Transcription (1963).
- The Origins of Hadith and Its Definition (1968).
- Extracts from the guidance of prophecy (1968).
- Glimpses in Library and Research (1971) - 24th edition (2005 AD).
- The Muhaddith separating the narrator from the conscious / Investigation (1971).
- Islamic Education: Its Objectives - Foundations - Methods - Teaching Methods (1975).
- Summary in Hadith Al-Ahkam (1975).
- Al-Wajeez in the Sciences of Hadith and its Texts (1978).
- Lights on Media in the Early Islam (1985).
- The family system in Islam / by participation (1985).
- Extracts from the guidance of the Qur’an and Sunnah / jointly (1980).
- In the Rehab of the Most Beautiful Names of God (1988).
- Islamic thought/By Participation (1990).
- Al-Jami' of the Ethics of the Narrator and the Ethics of the Hearer / Study and Investigation (1991).
- Summary of Hadith Al-Ahkam / By Participation (1998).
- Paths of sight in the kingdoms of Al-Amsar / Volume V (2002).
- Descriptive Index of the Hadith Books and Its Sciences (2002).

== Death ==
Sheikh Muhammad Ajaj Al-Khatib died on Monday, October 10 , 2021, at the age of 89. The Association of Palestine Scholars mourned him in a statement, saying "The Association of Palestine Scholars, represented by its president, A. Dr.. Nassim Yassin, the members of its board of directors and its general assembly, gives its deepest condolences and sympathy to the Syrian people for the death of His Eminence, Sheikh and scholar Dr.Muhammad Ajaj Al-Khatib Al-Hasani."
