= Abd al-Haqq Turkmani =

Iraqi-born English Islamic scholar and editor

ʿAbd al-Ḥaqq al-Turkmanī
- عبد الحق بن ملا حقي بن علي التركماني
- Born: December 8, 1969 (age 56); Kirkuk, Iraq
- Known for: Critical editions of works by Ibn Hazm; founding the Centre for Studies in the Interpretation of Islam
- Awards: Naif bin Abdulaziz Al Saud International Prize for the Prophet's Sunnah and Contemporary Islamic Studies (2010)

Academic work
- Institutions: Centre for Studies in the Interpretation of Islam (Leicester, UK)
- Notable works: Al-Dukhūl fī Amān Ghayr al-Muslimīn; Muqaddimah fī Tafsīr al-Islām; Critical editions of Ibn Ḥazm's works
- Website: turkmani.com

Abdul-Haqq ibn Mulla Haqqi ibn Ali al-Turkmani (born December 8, 1969) is a Muslim scholar who has written on creed, Hadith, jurisprudence, Islamic political thought, and contemporary Islamic issues. He has edited and published a corpus of works by Ibn Hazm al-Andalusi. He resides in the United Kingdom, where he founded the Center for Islamic Interpretation Studies in the city of Leicester.

== Early life and education ==
Al-Turkmani was born in the city of Kirkuk, northern Iraq, on 29 Ramadan 1389 AH (December 8, 1969). He belongs to the Iraqi Turkmen community. He joined the Faculty of Sharia at the University of Baghdad, but did not complete his studies due to political and health conditions. He later enrolled in the “Salafi University” in Islamabad, Pakistan, from which he obtained a bachelor's degree in Islamic Studies in 2003.

He faced political and social harassment in Iraq during the 1990s. In 1995, he migrated to Turkey, then to Sweden in 1996, where he settled and obtained Swedish citizenship.

== Religious and scholarly work ==
He moved from Iraq to Turkey in 1995, then to Sweden in 1996, where he worked as a preacher for 13 years and participated in Islamic outreach and translation projects. In 2011, he relocated to Britain, where he founded the Center for Islamic Interpretation Studies in Leicester. He focuses on editing and publishing the works of Ibn Hazm al-Andalusi and on studying the history of Islamic thought. He has published dozens of books, studies, and articles, and participated in academic conferences in several countries. He also serves as a legal consultant for a number of Islamic centers.

== Works ==
He has authored and edited many scholarly books. His notable works are:

1. Fadl al-Salat ‘ala al-Nabi ﷺ by Imam Isma‘il ibn Ishaq al-Qadi (d. 282 AH): Edited and studied, Dar Ramadi, Dammam, 1417 AH, 232 pages.
2. Al-Dukhul fi Aman Ghayr al-Muslimin wa Atharuhu fi al-Fiqh al-Islami, published within the Da‘wat al-Haqq series (No. 250), Muslim World League, Makkah, 1433 AH; 2nd ed. Dar al-Bashar al-Islamiyyah, Beirut, 1438 AH.
3. Al-Ta‘amul ma‘a Ghayr al-Muslimin fi al-Sunnah al-Nabawiyyah (co-authored), an award-winning paper in the 5th Naif ibn Abdulaziz International Prize for the Prophetic Sunnah and Contemporary Islamic Studies, 1431 AH / 2010 AD.
4. Muqaddimah fi Tafsir al-Islam, Center for Islamic Interpretation Studies, UK, 1st ed. 1438 AH, 2nd ed. 1439 AH, 280 pages.
5. Hal Ataka Naba’ al-Dustur?, Dar al-Sunnah, Riyadh, 1432 AH.
6. Da‘wat Jama‘at Qadi Zadah al-Islahiyyah fi al-Dawlah al-‘Uthmaniyyah, prepared by Muhammad Dawud Kuri, edited and presented by Abdul-Haqq al-Turkmani, Dar al-Lu’lu’ah, Beirut, 1438 AH, 164 pages.
7. Al-Tafsir al-Siyasi li al-Din fi Fikr Muhammad Shahrur, Center for Islamic Interpretation Studies, UK, 1441 AH.
8. Haqiqat Tawhid al-‘Ibadah bayn Shaykh al-Islam Ibn Taymiyyah, endorsed by Sheikh Ahmad Walad al-Murabit al-Shanqiti and others, Dar Ilaf al-Duwaliyah, Kuwait, 1st ed. 1443 AH / 2022 AD.

== Critical editions ==
He has edited several works by Ibn Hazm and other scholars, including:

1. Al-Taqrib li Hadd al-Mantiq, Ibn Hazm al-Andalusi – edited, revised, and studied with an introduction by Ibn Aqil al-Zahiri, Dar Ibn Hazm, Beirut, 1428 AH, 700 pages.
2. Hujjat al-Wada‘, Ibn Hazm al-Andalusi – study and edition, Dar Ibn Hazm, Beirut, 1429 AH, 888 pages.
3. Al-Durrah fima Yajibu I‘tiqaduh, Ibn Hazm – edited, Dar Ibn Hazm, Beirut, 1428 AH, 700 pages.
4. Al-Usul wal-Furu‘, Ibn Hazm – edited, Dar Ibn Hazm, Beirut, 1432 AH, 400 pages.
5. Tawq al-Hamamah wa Zill al-Ghamamah fi al-Ulfah wal-Alaf, Ibn Hazm – edited, Dar Ibn Hazm, Beirut, 1434 AH, 500 pages.
6. Al-Akhlaq wal-Siyar (also known as Risalah fi Mudawat al-Nufus wa Tahdhib al-Akhlaq), Ibn Hazm – edited jointly with Dr. Eva Riadh (Uppsala University), Dar Ibn Hazm, Beirut, 1421 AH, 3rd edition, 214 pages.
7. Al-Talkhis li Wujuh al-Takhlis, Ibn Hazm – edited, Dar Ibn Hazm, Beirut, 1423 AH, 204 pages.
8. Al-Luma‘ fi al-Hawadith wal-Bida‘, Idris ibn Baydakin al-Turkmani – study and presentation, Dar Ibn Hazm, Beirut, 1434 AH, 1000 pages.
9. Al-Tafsir al-Siyasi li al-Din li Wahid al-Din Khan wa al-Tafsir al-Siyasi li al-Islam li Abi al-Hasan al-Nadwi – study and commentary, Center for Islamic Interpretation Studies, UK, 1435 AH, 360 pages.
10. Ma‘na La Ilaha Illa Allah, by Sheikh Umar ibn Ahmad al-Malibari – introduction and commentary, Center for Islamic Interpretation Studies, UK, 1427 AH / 2016 AD.
11. Mu‘addil al-Salah, by Muhammad Effendi al-Barakawi – study and edition, Dar Sutoor, Madinah, 1444 AH / 2023 AD, 264 pages.

== Intellectual approach ==
He has been described as a scholar interested in Hadith studies and textual verification. He was influenced by the thought of Ibn Taymiyyah, Salih al-Luhaydan, and Muhammad ibn Uthaymin, and maintains scholarly ties with scholars from both East and West. His work reflects a Salafi approach with attention to classical Islamic sources alongside contemporary issues. His research focuses on:

- Highlighting the moral and social dimensions in Ibn Hazm's writings.
- Critiquing political Islamist movements, especially Qutbist and Maududian thought.
- Advocating for a balanced, academic presentation of Islam to Western audiences, free from extremism.

== Personal life ==
He has resided in Britain since 2010, where he continues his scholarly and religious work in cooperation with European Islamic centers, focusing on research, publication and the translation of Islamic sources.

== See also ==
- Ibn Hazm
- Abul A'la Maududi
- Sayyid Qutb
- Islam in Sweden
