= Abbas Modaresi Yazdi =

Iraqi Twelver Shi'a Grand Ayatollah (1943-2020)

Grand Ayatollah Sayyid Abbas Modaresi Yazdi
- Born: 1943; Najaf, Iraq
- Died: 19 November 2020 (aged 76–77); Qom, Iran
- Other name: Persian: آيت الله السيد عباس مدرسي يزدي

Grand Ayatollah Sayyid Abbas Modaresi Yazdi (Arabic: سيد عباس مدرسي يزدي; 1943 – 19 November 2020) was an Iraqi Twelver Shi'a Marja. He died on 19 November 2020 in Qom, Iran at the age of 77 from a heart attack.

== Teachers ==
He had a famous teacher such as:

- Muhsin al-Hakim
- Abu al-Qasim al-Khoei
- Sayyid Mahmoud Husseini Shahroudi
- Mirza Hashem Amoli

== Works ==
He is the author of some Islamic books:

Namādhij al-Uṣūl fī Sharḥ Maqālāt al-Uṣūl (8 volumes), Namūdhaj al-ʿUrwah wa Takmīluhā (5 volumes), Risālah fī Furūʿ al-ʿIlm al-Ijmālī (notes from the lessons of Sayyid Hasan al-Bojnordi), Namūdhaj al-Fiqh al-Jaʿfarī, Ḥāshiyah ʿalā Taḥrīr al-Wasīlah, and Risālah fī Jawāʾiz al-Sulṭān.

== See also ==
- List of maraji
