= Sharia advisor =

A Shariah advisor is a person or institution, deemed acceptable in Islamic financial services industry (or the Muslim community at large) to advise on Islamic legal and wider Shariah matters related with structuring of Islamic financial products. A Shariah advisor can be an independent individual, a group of individuals, or an institution with adequate human and technical resources to advise on legal and Shariah matters in the context of financial product structuring. An example of an individual Shariah advisor is Sheikh Nizam Yaqubi, a Bahraini national, who advises scores of institutions around the globe.

Individual Shariah advisors are of two types: (1) those trained in the classical Islamic legal tradition; and (2) those with contemporary educational background but impressive expertise in structuring of Islamic financial products. The former is represented by the likes of Mufti Taqi Usmani, a Pakistani cleric, who is chairman of the Shari'a advisory board of Accounting and Auditing Organisation of Islamic Financial Institutions (AAOIFI). The latter is represented by the likes of Dr Humayon Dar, who is an Islamic economist, with widely respected expertise in structuring innovative Islamic financial products.

In a number of jurisdictions, it is a regulatory requirement for Islamic financial institutions to appoint a Shariah advisor (with Pakistan, for example, requiring at least one individual to serve as a Shariah advisor for Islamic banks operating in the country; and Malaysia requiring Islamic banks to appoint a Shariah advisory committee comprising at least five individuals). In case of non-banking institutions and transactions, the requirements of Shariah advisory vary. In Malaysia, for example it is sufficient to appoint a Shariah advisory firm (an independent institution) to seek advice on Islamic capital market transactions. In Dubai International Financial Centre (DIFC), the requirement is to appoint a Shariah advisory committee comprising at least three individuals.
