= Wasiullah Abbas =

Indian Islamic scholar and Hadith professor (b. 1948)

Sheikh Dr. Wasiullah Abbas

Personal life
- Born: Wasiullah ibn Muhammad Abbas ibn Ahmad Abbas; 11 March 1948 (age 78) Pipra Bhoj, Basti District, Uttar Pradesh, India
- Children: 10 (5 Sons, 5 Daughters)
- Education: Islamic University of Madinah, Umm al-Qura University
- Occupation: Cleric, Professor
- Website: wasiullahabbas.wordpress.com

Religious life
- Religion: Islam
- Denomination: Sunni
- Jurisprudence: Ghayr Muqallid
- Creed: Athari
- Movement: Salafi, Ahl-i Hadith

Muslim leader
- Influenced by: Ibn Baz, Syed Nazeer Husain Dehlawi, Ibn Taymiyyah, Ahmad ibn Hanbal, al-Uthaymin

YouTube information
- Channel: Dr Wasiullah Abbas
- Genre: Islamic
- Subscribers: 20,200
- Views: 1,440,290
- Last updated: 23 June 2026

Wasiullah Abbas (born 11 March, 1948) is an Indian Islamic scholar and teacher. He holds a PhD and master's degree in Hadith sciences, and currently resides and has taught in Mecca at Umm al-Qura University as a professor. He is regarded as one of the main Ahl-i Hadith scholars active in Mecca and Saudi Arabia as a whole.

== Early life ==
Wasiullah Abbas is an Indian Islamic scholar and teacher born on 11 March 1948. He began his Islamic education in a Madrasa in his local village. Later, he transferred to Darul Huda School in Yusufpur which was run by students of the Ahl-i Hadith scholar Syed Nazeer Husain Dehlawi. In these schools, he studied the Arabic language, fiqh, and issues of Aqeedah, including primary texts of the Māturīdī school, examined through a critical lens of their interpretation of the attributes of Allah. After completing his studies at Darul Huda, he was transferred to Jaamiah Rahmaniyyah in Banaras in 1963.

== Education and scholarship in Saudi Arabia ==
Later in his life, Abbas was selected by the administration of Jaamiah Rahmaniyyah to receive higher education in Saudi Arabia during the inauguration of a new school, Jaamiah Salafiyyah Banaras, where Ibn Baz directed his representative at the event, Abdul Qadir Shaibatul Hamd, to request that some exemplary students travel to Saudi Arabia and study at the Islamic University of Madinah. This led to Abbas going to Saudi Arabia in 1967 with him getting a high school degree in 2 years from the Islamic university and a bachelor's degree in the Dawah/Usool ad-Deen and Tafseer/Hadith Departments four years later. After this, he transferred to Umm al-Qura University, where he completed a master's degree and PhD on topics of the Hadith.

While completing his PhD, the Grand Mosque Institute of Masjid al-Haram was in need of a lecturer for Hadith and Tafsir and so chose him to teach at the institute starting from 1979. In 1989, he left and became an assistant professor at Umm al-Qura where he became a professor in 2011. In 1999, he was appointed as a lecturer inside the Grand Mosque by then President of the Affairs of the Two Holy Mosques, Sheikh Mohammad Al Subail. He has also taught classes and given lectures internationally, with Dawah trips in Egypt, Yemen, India, the United Kingdom, France, and Bahrain. Additionally, he teaches and publishes lessons and lectures in Arabic, Urdu, and English.

== Selection of major works ==
- Following and the Principles of Jurisprudence of the Salaf
- An Investigation into the Obligation of Reciting Behind the Imam
- Investigating Part of the Book “Lisan al-Mizan”
- Imitation and Its Ruling in Light of the Quran and Sunnah
- The Defects and Knowledge of Men
- The Science of Hadith Defects and Its Role in Preserving the Sunnah
- Redemption in Khula’
- The Virtues of the Companions
- Following and the Principles of the Jurisprudence of the Salaf (Urdu edition)
- Islam is the Solution for Humanity (Urdu edition)
- The Weak, the Unknown and the Abandoned in Sunan Al-Nasa’i (Master's Thesis)
- The Virtues of the Companions of Imam Ahmad Ibn Hanbal (Doctoral Thesis)
