= Ajni Sinani =

Albanian Imam

- Title: Imam

Personal life
- Born: November 13, 1962 (age 63) Dragash, SAP Kosovo, SFR Yugoslavia
- Home town: Prizren
- Main interest(s): Fiqh, Aqidah, Kalam, Islamic Studies
- Education: Al-Azhar University
- Occupation: Alim, Imam

Religious life
- Religion: Islam
- Denomination: Sunni
- Jurisprudence: Hanafi
- Creed: Maturidi

Muslim leader
- Post: Head of the Assembly of the Islamic Community of Kosovo
- Period in office: 2013-present

Ajni Sinani (born November 13, 1962) is an Albanian theologian, imam, alim, and professor from Kosovo. He is known for his active presence on Facebook, where he shares insights and statements about the geopolitical and religious issues in Kosovo.

== Life ==
Ajni ef. Sinani was born on November 13, 1962, in Zaplluxhe, Dragash. He completed his studies at Al-Azhar University in Cairo, Egypt, in 1998, graduating from the Faculty of Islamic and Arabic Studies. He earned a master's degree in International Law and Relations from the University of Prishtina in 2009, focusing on the Palestinian issue post-World War II (1948–2008). In 2016, he completed his doctoral studies at the International University of Novi Pazar, researching Sharia courts and muftiates in Kosovo between World War I and World War II (1918–1941).

Between 1997 and 1999, Sinani lectured on Islamic jurisprudence (fiqh) and the Arabic language at the "Haxhi Sheh Shamia" madrasa in Shkodër, Albania. After this period, he began serving as an imam in Prizren, a role that further connected him with the local community. Since 2010, he has been teaching Fiqh and the History of Sharia Law at the Faculty of Islamic Studies in Prishtina.

He has served as the president of the Assembly of the Islamic Community of Kosovo since 2013 and as the editor-in-chief of the magazine Dituria Islame since 2016.

Sinani has participated in conferences and symposiums, contributed to various publications, and worked on translations and reviews of Islamic texts. In 1994, he oversaw the reprint of the Quran translation into Albanian and Bosnian in Cairo.

== Works ==
Sinani has made works on Islamic law, history, and interfaith relations. Some of his notable works include:

- Islami: Fe, Ligj, Kulturë dhe Qytetërim (2007)
- Çështja Palestinese pas Luftës së Dytë Botërore (2009)
- Të Tjerët për Islamin (2015)
