= Nuhu Muzaata =

Ugandan Muslim Leader

- Born: Nuhu Muzaata Batte; 1955
- Died: December 4, 2020

Nuhu Muzaata Batte (1955 – December 4, 2020) was a Ugandan Muslim leader and spokesperson for the Kibuli-based Muslim faction. He was known for his outspokenness, ability to connect with people from all walks of life, and his contributions to the promotion of Islamic values in Uganda.

== Early life and education ==
Nuhu Muzaata Batte was born in Bwaise, Lufula Zone, near Kimombasa area, to the late Adam Muzaata, who was also a sheikh and an Islamic religious healer. Muzaata's grandfather, Kamadi Muzaata, originally hailed from Tanzania, and migrated to Uganda in the early 1800s, settling in the Buganda region.

Growing up in Bwaise, a congested and ghetto Kampala suburb, Muzaata inherited the area's character, including the abusive language he used, according to other Muslim sheikhs in Uganda. He began studying the Islamic religion and the Quran with his father teaching him at home. At age seven, his father moved him to Bilal Quran Islamic School, formerly Binyira, in Bwaise, where he studied for a short time.

Former students who attended the Bilal Quran Islamic School with Muzaata described him as a scarecrow who even teachers were careful about, given his body structure and language. They added that he was a cruel man who was feared by every student, including those in upper classrooms. When annoyed, he would act immediately with a slap or a kick without anyone intervening. However, the sheikhs who preferred anonymity also noted that Muzaata was a clever boy in class and could read Arabic words correctly.

Muzaata participated in various clubs at school, including debating clubs on politics and religion. In 1982, he finished his studies at Bilal and joined the University of Madina in Saudi Arabia, where he was ordained a Sheikh. Upon returning home, he combined preaching the word of Allah with running a tour and travel company that transported Muslim pilgrims to Mecca and Medina for Hajj and Umrah.

As the head of Dawa in Uganda, Muzaata stressed the importance of education in the field and required candidates to present papers and undergo interviews to assess their eligibility. He also noted that to be a leader, one must hold a degree in Sharia Laws, be aged between 40 and 70 years, and have no criminal record.

Muzaata married several wives, and his family has remained private. He died on December 4, 2020, at the International Hospital Kampala, Uganda, following complications from COVID-19.

== Career ==
Nuhu Muzaata Batte was a Ugandan Muslim cleric and the spokesperson of the Uganda Muslim Supreme Council (UMSC) from 2018 until his death. He was known for his controversial statements and criticism of other religious leaders, politicians, and social issues.

Muzaata was born in Kibuli, a suburb of Kampala, Uganda, in either 1969 or 1970. He attended various Islamic schools in Uganda and Saudi Arabia before pursuing a career in Islamic preaching. He was a well-known preacher in Uganda, delivering sermons at mosques and various Islamic events.

In 2018, Muzaata was appointed as the spokesperson of the UMSC, the highest Islamic religious body in the country. In this role, he was responsible for communicating the council's official positions on various issues affecting the Muslim community in Uganda. He was also known for using his platform to criticize other religious leaders and politicians, often drawing controversy.

One of Muzaata's most controversial statements came in 2019 when he referred to Yunus Kamoga, a convicted terrorist and former leader of the Tabliq sect in Uganda, as a hero. His comments were widely criticized by many Ugandans, who saw them as a glorification of terrorism. Muzaata later apologized for the statement.

Muzaata was also known for his outspokenness on social issues such as homosexuality, which he condemned as un-Islamic. His comments on the issue drew both support and criticism from different quarters.

On December 4, 2020, Muzaata died at the International Hospital Kampala, where he had been admitted for several weeks with respiratory complications. His death was widely mourned by members of the Muslim community in Uganda and beyond.

Muzaata's legacy as a controversial figure in Ugandan Islamic circles remains a topic of debate. While some see him as a defender of Islamic values and principles, others criticize him for his divisive comments and rhetoric.

== Controversies ==
One of the most notable incidents in Muzaata's career came in 2014 when he publicly criticized the Buganda kingdom, one of the most powerful cultural institutions in Uganda. His comments sparked a heated debate, with some people calling for his arrest, while others defended his right to free speech.

== Legacy ==
Muzaata's death on December 4, 2020, after a short illness was a great loss to the Muslim community and Uganda. However, his legacy lives on, and he is remembered as a passionate advocate for Islam and a champion of free speech and social justice.
