= Hindostan (ship) =

A number of ships have been named Hindostan or Hindustan, after the old name for the Indian subcontinent:

- Hindostan (1817 ship) was launched at Liverpool in 1817. initially, she traded with India under a licence from the British East India Company (EIC). She also traded with the United States, Singapore, Africa, and Central America. She was wrecked on 24 December 1838 near Omoa, Honduras.
- Hindostan (1819 ship) was launched at Whitby in 1819. She made one voyage, in 1821, transporting convicts to New South Wales. Later, she made two voyages transporting convicts to Van Diemen's Land, one with female convicts (1839), and one with male convicts (1840–1841). When not transporting convicts Hindostan was a general trader, sailing across the Atlantic, to India, and perhaps elsewhere as well. She was lost in 1841.
- SS Hindostan (1842) was a P&O side paddle-wheel steamer that sank in a cyclone in Calcutta in 1864 while employed as a storeship.
- SS Hindostan (1863) was built for British & Eastern Shipping Co., which sold her in 1873 to the New Zealand Shipping Co. That company renamed her Waitara. She sank in 1883 following a collision with Hurunui in the English Channel, with a loss of 20 lives.
- SS Hindostan (1869) was a P&O steamer that was wrecked on a reef near Madras in 1879.

== See also ==
- Hindostan (East Indiaman), several ships
- HMS Hindustan, several ships
- Hindostan (disambiguation)
