= Babakhan =

Babakhan or Babahan (Russian: Бабахан, Persian: باباخان, Uzbek: Boboxon) is a masculine given name found among various Muslim of Russia indigenous to North Caucasus, Tatarstan, and Central Asia. It consists of two parts of Persian origin: baba (Persian: بابا) + khan. "Baba" a form of respectful address, usually to an elder (father, grandfather), i.e., "babakhan" may mean "respected lord", "elder lord", etc. Also, "khan" may be used as an affix that increases the respectfulness of the address "baba". Patronymic surnames Babakhanov and Babakhanyan are derived from it.

It can also be a Turkish surname.

Notable people with the name include:

- Babakhan Babakhanov, a founder of the Lezgian Musical and Drama Theatre
- Babakhan Badalov, birth name of Babi Badalov (born 1959), Azerbaijani visual artist and poet
- Babakhan Garayev, musician from Azerbaijani band Yukhu
- Puthanparambil Babakhan Abdul Razzaq Saleh or P. B. A. Saleh, Indian footballer
- Ishan Babakhan ibn Abdulmajidkhan (1858–1957), Islamic religious figure, Grand Mufti of Soviet Central Asia
- Ergun Babahan (born 1960), Turkish journalist, columnist, and television personality

== See also ==
- Ali Baba
- Baba Khan
- Lady Babahan (八八罕妃子), a concubine of Kublai Khan
