= Hindustani =

Hindustani may refer to:

- something of, from, or related to Hindustan (another name of India)
- Hindustani language, an Indo-Aryan language, with Hindi and Urdu being its two standard registers
- Fiji Hindi, a variety of Eastern Hindi spoken in Fiji, and is known locally as Hindustani
- Caribbean Hindustani, a variety of Eastern Hindi spoken in the Caribbean, locally known as Hindustani
- Hindustani classical music, a major style of Indian classical music
- Hindustani (film) or Indian, a 1996 film starring Kamal Haasan and Manisha Koirala
- Muhammadjan Hindustani, Islamist teacher of Uzbekistan

== See also ==
- Hindustan (disambiguation)
- Hind (disambiguation)
- Hindi (disambiguation)
- Indo-Surinamese people
- South Asian ethnic groups
- Hindustani Lal Sena or Indian Red Army, formed 1939
- Hindoostane Coffee House, London, England
- Hindistani, a Saudi Arabian TV series set in India
- Communist Ghadar Party of India, a political group founded in 1970
- Raja Hindustani, a 1996 Indian film starring Aamir Khan and Karishma Kapoor
