= Ziyauddinkhan ibn Ishan Babakhan =

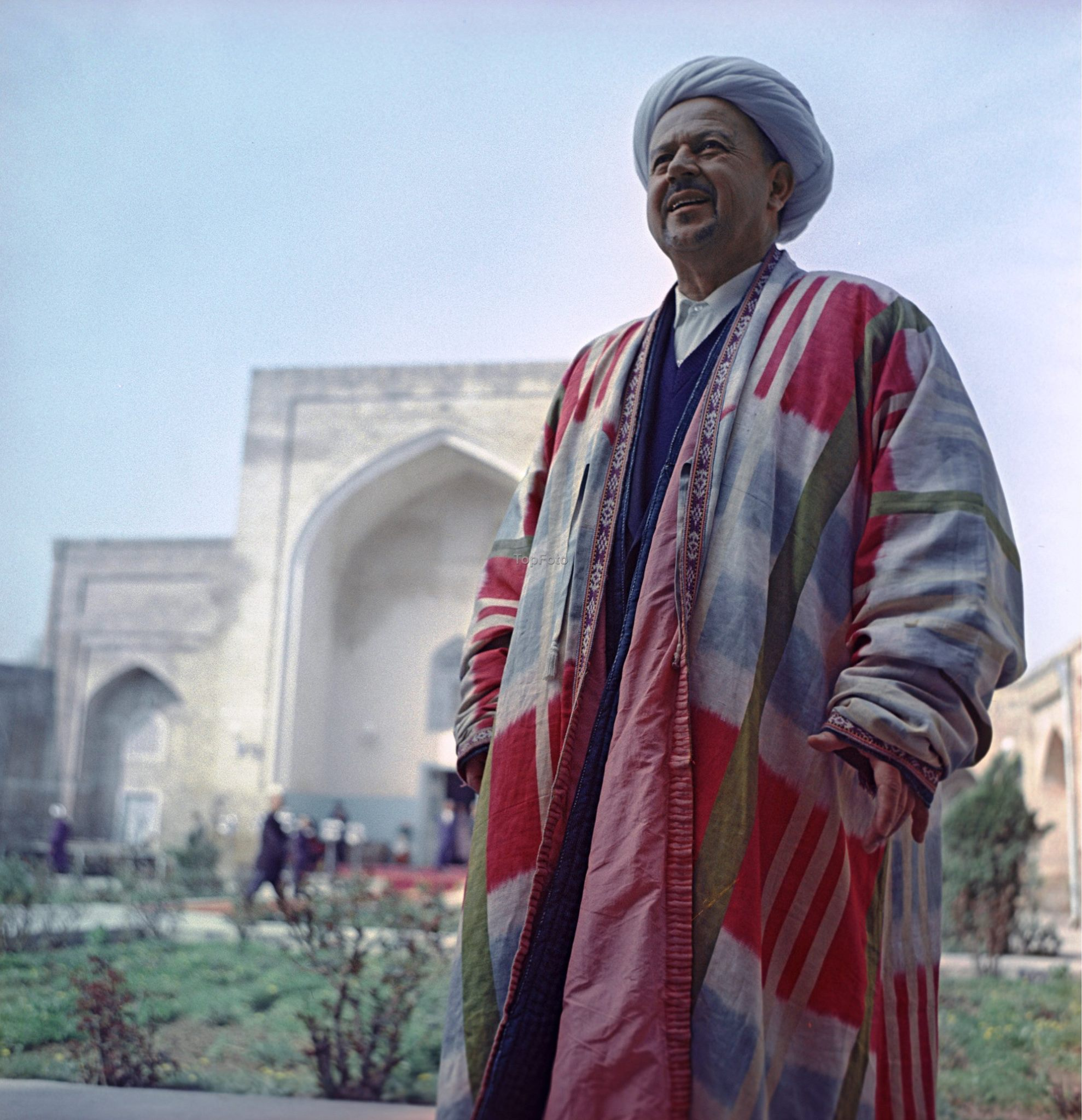
- Born: January 8, 1908; Tashkent
- Died: December 23, 1982 (aged 74); Tashkent
- Occupation(s): Chairman of Spiritual Administration of the Muslims of Central Asia and Kazakhstan

Ziyauddinkhan ibn Ishan Babakhan (Uzbek: Ziyovuddinxon ibn Eshon Boboxon, 1908–1982) was an Islamic religious figure, theologist, Shaykh al-Islām active in Soviet Union and leader of Spiritual Administration of the Muslims of Central Asia and Kazakhstan (SADUM) between 1957 and 1982.

Ziyauddin Babakhan's father, Ishan Babakhan ibn Abdulmajidkhan was elected mufti of SADUM when the latter was established in 1943. Ziyauddin was its secretary and the officially recognized qadi. He spent 1947–1948 studying in Egypt and Saudi Arabia.

Ziyauddin Babakhan succeeded him upon his death in 1957, although he had de facto been in charge already for several years. Over the years, Ziyauddin Babakhan issued numerous fatwas that were marked by their radical departure from the Hanafi consensus of the ulama of Central Asia. In their radical denigration of customary practices, and their appeal to the Quran and hadith, these fatwas were indicative of the influence of Shami Domla, but also of broader scripturalist currents common in the Muslim world at the time. The fatwas were also in a direct line of descent from the strident modernism of the Jadids.

Ziyauddin Babakhan was also the face of Soviet Islam to the rest of the world. He traveled widely and hosted delegations from all over the world. In 1980, he hosted an international Islamic conference in Tashkent to mark the advent of the fifteenth century of the Islamic calendar.

He died in 1982 and is buried next to his father near the mausoleum of Abu Bakr Kaffal-i Shashi.
