= List of shipwrecks in December 1838 =

The list of shipwrecks in December 1838 includes ships sunk, foundered, wrecked, grounded, or otherwise lost during December 1838.

== 1 December ==
List of shipwrecks: 1 December 1838
Ship	State	Description
Argonaut	Spain	The brig was wrecked on the Gingerbread Key with the loss of 47 lives. She was on a voyage from Havana, Cuba to Santander.
Bee	United Kingdom	The ship was driven ashore at South Shields, County Durham. She was later refloated.
Brothers	United Kingdom	The ship sank at Aberdeen. She was on a voyage from Port Dundas, Renfrewshire to Aberdeen.
Dauntless	United Kingdom	The ship was wrecked on the Jadder with the loss of a crew member. She was on a voyage from Pillau, Prussia to Aberdeen.
Frances	United Kingdom	The ship was driven ashore and wrecked at Cardiff, Glamorgan.
Gannell	United Kingdom	The smack was beached at Rhoscolyn, Anglesey. Her crew were rescued. She was on a voyage from Waterford to Falmouth, Cornwall. Gannell was refloated on 3 January 1839.
Germ	(United Kingdom of Great Britain and Ireland) British North America	The ship ran aground off Bermuda. She was refloated and towed into St. George's, Bermuda, where she was scuttled.
Mary Elliot	United Kingdom	The ship was driven ashore near Holyhead, Anglesey.Her crew were rescued. She was on a voyage from Cork to Newhaven, Sussex.
Naiad	United Kingdom	The ship was driven ashore at Sandhale, Lincolnshire. She was on a voyage from London to Goole, Yorkshire. Naiad was refloated the next day and resumed her voyage.
Robert Quail	United Kingdom	The ship was wrecked on the Altwen Rocks, in Carnarvon Bay with the loss of four of her crew.
Star	United Kingdom	The ship was driven ashore near Milford Haven, Pembrokeshire. All twelve people on board were rescued. She was on a voyage from Cuba to Swansea, Glamorgan. Star broke up on 3 December.

== 2 December ==
List of shipwrecks: 2 December 1838
Ship	State	Description
Alert	United Kingdom	The ship was abandoned in the English Channel off Boulogne-sur-Mer, Pas-de-Calais, France. She was on a voyage from Gloucester to London. Alert was later taken in to Calais.
Ann Worthington	United Kingdom	The ship was wrecked near Cape Wrath, Sutherland. She was on a voyage from Limerick to Stockton-on-Tees, County Durham She was refloated in May 1839 and taken into Greenock, Renfrewshire for repairs.
Brazil Packet	United Kingdom	The ship ran aground at Cowes, Isle of Wight. She was on a voyage from Montevideo, Uruguay to Cowes.
Don	United Kingdom	The ship ran aground on the Dorman Shoal, in the Irish Sea off the coast of County Down. She was on a voyage from Quebec City, Lower Canada, British North America to Liverpool, Lancashire. Don was refloated and put into Belfast, County Antrim.
Experiment	United Kingdom	The ship was driven ashore near Seaview, Isle of Wight and was abandoned. She was on a voyage from London to Liverpool. Experiment was later refloated and taken into Portsmouth, Hampshire.
Experiment	United Kingdom	The ship was driven ashore at Callantsoog, North Holland, Netherlands. Her crew were rescued. She was on a voyage from London to Sunderland, County Durham.
Hamburgh	United Kingdom	The schooner ran aground on the Hayley Sand, in the English Channel off the coast of Hampshire.
Mary Ann	United Kingdom	The ship was wrecked near Weymouth, Dorset with the loss of a crew member.
Migara	United Kingdom	The ship was wrecked at "Sand Sting", County Limerick with the loss of all hands.
Pembroke Castle	United Kingdom	The ship ran aground and was severely damaged at Milford Haven, Pembrokeshire. She was on a voyage from Milford Haven to Pembroke.
Prosperous	United Kingdom	The sloop was driven ashore 3 nautical miles (5.6 km) east of Wells-next-the-Sea, Norfolk. She was on a voyage from London to King's Lynn, Norfolk.
Sceptre	United Kingdom	The schooner was driven ashore and wrecked near Holyhead, Anglesey with the loss of five of her seven crew. She was on a voyage from Saint Domingo to Falmouth, Cornwall.
Trio	United Kingdom	The ship was wrecked on the Black Middens, in the North Sea off the coast of County Durham. Her crew were rescued.
Volant	United States	The ship was wrecked at Cape St. Mary's, Newfoundland, British North America.

== 3 December ==
List of shipwrecks: 3 December 1838
Ship	State	Description
Acorn	United Kingdom	The ship ran aground and was damaged at Blyth, Northumberland. She was on a voyage from Blyth to London. Acorn was refloated and put back to Blyth for repairs.
Augusta	United States	The steamboat was destroyed by a boiler explosion in the Mississippi River between Natchez and Vicksburg, Mississippi. Twenty of the 28 people on board were killed.
Elizabeth	United Kingdom	The ship was wrecked on Mainland, Shetland Islands with the loss of all hands.
Esther	United Kingdom	The barque was abandoned in the Atlantic Ocean (45°46′N 27°37′W). Her eight crew were rescued by Eliza Ann (United States).
L'Herminie	French Navy	The 60 gun Surviellante class frigate was wrecked at Bermuda.
Lively	United Kingdom	The ship was driven ashore and sank at Dartmouth, Devon. Her crew were rescued. She was on a voyage from London to Dartmouth.
Matilda	United Kingdom	The brig ran aground on the St. Lambert Rocks, in the Gironde near Pauillac, Nouvelle-Aquitaine France. She was later refloated.

== 4 December ==
List of shipwrecks: 4 December 1838
Ship	State	Description
Elizabeth	(United Kingdom of Great Britain and Ireland) New South Wales	The barque was driven ashore and capsized at Sydney. She was later refloated.
Fanny	United Kingdom	The ship was driven ashore at Beaumaris, Anglesey. She was on a voyage from Liverpool, Lancashire to Newry, County Antrim.
Margaret	United Kingdom	The ship was driven ashore at Cley-next-the-Sea, Norfolk. She was on a voyage from Hartlepool, County Durham to London. Margaret was later refloated and taken into Cley-next-the-Sea.
Reward	United Kingdom	The ship was driven ashore and wrecked at Salcombe, Devon.
Sarah	United Kingdom	The ship was driven ashore at Wells-next-the-Sea, Norfolk. She was on a voyage from Goole, Yorkshire to London. Sarah was later refloated and resumed her voyage.
Thames	(United Kingdom of Great Britain and Ireland) British North America	Battle of Windsor: The steamer was burned by members of the secret American Hunters Lodge organization at Windsor, Upper Canada.

== 5 December ==
List of shipwrecks: 5 December 1838
Ship	State	Description
Jules	France	The ship was wrecked near Alicante, Spain. She was on a voyage from Marseille, Bouches-du-Rhône to Havre de Grâce, Seine-Inférieure.
Robert Scourfield	United Kingdom	The ship was driven ashore in the Bosphorus. She was later refloated.
Schmit	Flag unknown	The ship departed from "Kivenhal" for Goole, Yorkshire, United Kingdom. No further trace, presumed foundered with the loss of all hands.
Sarah	United Kingdom	The ship ran aground and sank at Cemaes Bay, Anglesey. She was later refloated.
Wanderer	United Kingdom	The brig was run into by Aido (United States) at New York, United States and was wrecked.
William	United Kingdom	The ship was wrecked on Great Orme Head, Caernarfonshire.

== 6 December ==
List of shipwrecks: 6 December 1838
Ship	State	Description
Aimwell	United Kingdom	The ship was wrecked on Crooked Island, Bahamas with the loss of two of her crew. She was on a voyage from St. Jago de Cuba, Cuba to Swansea, Glamorgan.
James Samson	United Kingdom	The smack was wrecked on the coast of Ayrshire with the loss of all three crew. She was on a voyage from Belfast, County Antrim to Glasgow, Renfrewshire.
Lively	United Kingdom	The ship was driven ashore at Caister-on-Sea, Norfolk. She was on a voyage from Whitby, Yorkshire to London. Lively was later refloated and resumed her voyage.

== 7 December ==
List of shipwrecks: 7 December 1838
Ship	State	Description
Duchess of Gordon	United Kingdom	The ship foundered in the North Sea off Rattray Head, Aberdeenshire with the loss of all hands.
Emily	United Kingdom	The ship ran aground at Wood Island, Maine, United States and was wrecked. Her crew were rescued. She was on a voyage from St. Andrews, New Brunswick, British North America to Boston, Massachusetts, United States.
James Barnes	United Kingdom	The ship ran aground at Berbice, British Guiana.
HMS Lucifer	Royal Navy	The paddle steamer ran aground on Taylor's Bank, in Liverpool Bay. She was later refloated.
Margaret Thompson	United Kingdom	The ship ran aground at Berbice.
Neptunus	Sweden	The ship was wrecked near "Utwalnaas". Her crew were rescued. She was on a voyage from Malmö to Gävle.
St. Joachim	Portugal	The ship was driven ashore at Bearhaven, County Cork, United Kingdom. She was on a voyage from St. Ubes to Cork.

== 8 December ==
List of shipwrecks: 8 December 1838
Ship	State	Description
Enterprise	United Kingdom	The ship was driven ashore and wrecked at Cork.
Frans Wilkins	Netherlands	The ship was wrecked on Borkum, Kingdom of Hanover. She was on a voyage from Østerisør, Norway to Delfzijl, South Holland.
Isabella	United Kingdom	The ship ran aground on the Shipwash Sand, in the North Sea off the coast of Suffolk. She was on a voyage from Sunderland, County Durham to London. Isabella was later refloated and resumed her voyage.
Louisa	United Kingdom	The ship ran aground on the Shipwash Sand. She was later refloated and resumed her voyage.
Martha	United States	The new fishing schooner was lost in a gale off Brace's Cove between Essex and Gloucester. Lost with all hands.
Minerva	Netherlands	The ship was wrecked near Cherbourg, Seine-Inférieure, France. Her crew were rescued. She was on a voyage from Surinam to Amsterdam, North Holland.
Oratava	Spain	The brig was in collision with Janet (United Kingdom) in the English Channel and was abandoned by her crew, who were rescued by Janet. Orotava was on a voyage from Bremen to Tenerife, Canary Islands. She was subsequently taken into Newhaven, Sussex, United Kingdom.

== 9 December ==
List of shipwrecks: 9 December 1838
Ship	State	Description
Countess of Liverpool	United Kingdom	The ship was driven ashore at Gibraltar. She was on a voyage from Messina, Sicily to London. Countess of Liverpool was later refloated.
Didias	United Kingdom	The ship was driven onto the Shipwash Sand, in the North Sea off the coast of Suffolk. She was on a voyage from Newcastle upon Tyne, Northumberland to London. Didias was later refloated and resumed her voyage.
Ditto	United Kingdom	The ship was driven ashore near Gibraltar. She was on a voyage from Ancona, Papal States to Liverpool, Lancashire.
Frederick	France	The ship sailed from Marseille, Bouches-du-Rhône. No further trace, presumed foundered with the loss of all hands.
Glasgow	United Kingdom	The paddle steamer ran aground in Liverpool Bay. She was on a voyage from Dundalk, County Louth to Liverpool, Lancashire.
Jason	United Kingdom	The ship was wrecked on the coast of the Beylik of Tunis. She was on a voyage from Odesa to Falmouth, Cornwall.
Polytheme	France	The ship was driven ashore at Gibraltar. Her crew were rescued. She was on a voyage from Marseille, Bouches-du-Rhône to Île Bourbon.
Stad Lingen	Netherlands	The ship foundered off the Dutch coast. Her crew were rescued by Jacobus (Netherlands). Stad Lingen was on a voyage from Riga, Ottoman Empire to Rotterdam, South Holland.
Telemaque	France	The ship was wrecked on the Île de Batz, Finistère. She was on a voyage from Nantes, Loire-Inférieure to Morlaix, Finistère.
Triton	United Kingdom	The ship ran aground off Gibraltar. She was on a voyage from Smyrna, Russia to Liverpool. Triton was refloated with assistance from HMS Wasp (Royal Navy) and resumed her voyage.

== 10 December ==
List of shipwrecks: 10 December 1838
Ship	State	Description
Adventure	United Kingdom	The ship ran aground in the Shipwash Sand, in the North Sea off the coast of Suffolk, or the Cross Sand, off the coast of Norfolk. She was later refloated.
Henriette	Denmark	The ship was wrecked near Egersund, Norway with the loss of a crew member. She was on a voyage from Copenhagen to Liverpool, Lancashire, United Kingdom.
Roscoe	United Kingdom	The ship was driven ashore at Thurso, Caithness. She was on a voyage from Dalhousie, New Brunswick, British North America to Leith, Lothian. Roscoe was refloated on 18 December and taken into Scrabster, Caithness.
Roseway	(United Kingdom of Great Britain and Ireland) British North America	The ship was wrecked on Gibbon's Point, Saint Kitts.
Swift	United Kingdom	The ship ran aground on the Gunfleet Sand, in the North Sea off the coast of Essex. She was on a voyage from London to Great Yarmouth, Norfolk. Swift was later refloated and resumed her voyage.

== 11 December ==
List of shipwrecks: 11 December 1838
Ship	State	Description
Ceres	United Kingdom	The ship was severely damaged at Saint Petersburg, Russia.
Gertrude	United Kingdom	The ship was sunk by ice at Saint Petersburg. Her crew were rescued.
Julius	United Kingdom	The ship was driven ashore and damaged at Saint Petersburg.

== 12 December ==
List of shipwrecks: 12 December 1838
Ship	State	Description
Puella	United Kingdom	The ship ran aground on the White Dyke. She was on a voyage from Ramsgate, Kent to Glasgow, Renfrewshire. Puella was refloated and put back to Ramsgate.

== 13 December ==
List of shipwrecks: 13 December 1838
Ship	State	Description
Triton	United Kingdom	The ship was wrecked off Bornholm, Denmark. She was on a voyage from Liverpool, Lancashire to Stockholm, Sweden.

== 14 December ==
List of shipwrecks: 14 December 1838
Ship	State	Description
Blucher	United Kingdom	The ship was driven ashore at Scarborough, Yorkshire. She was on a voyage from Sunderland, County Durham to London. Blucher was later refloated and taken into Scarborough.
Coronation	United Kingdom	The ship was driven ashore in Dundalk Bay. She was on a voyage from London to Sligo. Coronation was refloated the next day and resumed her voyage.
Triton	United Kingdom	The ship was wrecked off Bornholm, Denmark. Her crew were rescued.

== 15 December ==
List of shipwrecks: 15 December 1838
Ship	State	Description
Ebenezer	United Kingdom	The ship departed from Seville, Spain for London.No further trace, presumed foundered with the loss of all hands.
Louise	France	The ship ran aground in the Auray. She was on a voyage from Riga, Russia to Nantes, Loire-Inférieure.

== 16 December ==
List of shipwrecks: 16 December 1838
Ship	State	Description
Charlotte	United Kingdom	The ship was driven ashore on Mainland, Orkney Islands.
Evergreen	United Kingdom	The ship was driven ashore in the River Mersey. She was on a voyage from Saint John's, Newfoundland, British North America to Liverpool, Lancashire. Evergreen was refloated the next day and taken into Liverpool.
Grenfell	United Kingdom	The ship departed from St. Jago de Cuba, Cuba for Swansea, Glamorgan. No further trace, presumed foundered with the loss of all hands.
Seraphine	France	The ship foundered off "Jarros". Her crew were rescued.

== 17 December ==
List of shipwrecks: 17 December 1838
Ship	State	Description
Anthony	United Kingdom	The ship was wrecked on the Seven Stones Reef with the loss of five lives. She was on a voyage from Gloucester to London.
Diligence	United Kingdom	The ship ran aground on the Woolmers, in the English Channel. Her crew were rescued. She was on a voyage from Shoreham-by-Sea, Sussex to Southampton, Hampshire. Diligence was refloated and taken into Langstone, Hampshire in a waterlogged condition.
Ditto	(United Kingdom of Great Britain and Ireland) Jersey	The ship departed from Gibraltar for Liverpool, Lancashire. She subsequently foundered off Fishguard, Pembrokeshire on or before 8 January 1839.
HMS Tyne	Royal Navy	The ship capsized off the Golden Horn, Ottoman Empire with the loss of four of the seven crew aboard.
Westmoreland	United Kingdom	The ship capsized at Cork.

== 18 December ==
List of shipwrecks: 18 December 1838
Ship	State	Description
Prins Carl	Denmark	The ship ran aground off "Berche Island" and was severely damaged. She was refloated and taken into Saint Croix, Virgin Islands.
Orontes	United Kingdom	The ship struck a rock and sank at Port Essington, New South Wales. Her crew were rescued. She was on a voyage from New South Wales to India.

== 19 December ==
List of shipwrecks: 19 December 1838
Ship	State	Description
Bethel	United Kingdom	The ship was driven ashore at Bideford, Devon. She was on a voyage from Prince Edward Island, British North America to Bridport.
Juliana	United Kingdom	The emigrant ship was wrecked at Green Point, Cape Town, Cape Colony. All on board, 244 passengers plus her crew, were rescued.
Macassar	Netherlands	The ship ran aground on the Goodwin Sands, Kent, United Kingdom. She was on a voyage from Rotterdam, South Holland to Batavia, Netherlands East Indies. Macassar was later refloated and taken into The Downs.
Marie	Netherlands	The ship ran aground on the Goodwin Sands. She was on a voyage from Rotterdam to Liverpool, Lancashire, United Kingdom. Marie was later refloated and anchored off Margate, Kent.
Nautilus	United Kingdom	The ship was driven ashore at Newbiggin-by-the-Sea, Northumberland. She was on a voyage from Boston, Lincolnshire to Leith, Lothian. Nautilus was later refloated and taken into Blyth, Northumberland.
Susan	United Kingdom	The ship struck rocks and sank at Seaton Sluice, County Durham. She was on a voyage from King's Lynn, Norfolk to Seaton Sluice.

== 20 December ==
List of shipwrecks: 20 December 1838
Ship	State	Description
Eleanor Jane	United Kingdom	The ship was lost near Deer Island, Newfoundland, British North America. Her crew were rescued. She was on a voyage from Saint John, New Brunswick, British North America to Boston, Massachusetts, United States.
Enterprise	France	The ship was wrecked at Île Bourbon.
George	United Kingdom	The sloop was driven ashore and wrecked at Eyemouth, Berwickshire. Her crew were rescued. She was on a voyage from Eyemouth to Newcastle upon Tyne, Northumberland.
Maria	Kingdom of Sardinia	The ship was driven ashore in the Dry Tortugas. She was on a voyage from Genoa to Veracruz, Mexico. Maria was refloated and taken into Key West, Florida Territory.

== 21 December ==
List of shipwrecks: 21 December 1838
Ship	State	Description
Hebe	United Kingdom	The ship ran aground on the Cross Sand, in the North Sea off the coast of Norfolk. She was later refloated and taken into Great Yarmouth.
Hercules	United Kingdom	The ship was driven ashore at Spurn Point, Yorkshire. She was on a voyage from South Shields, County Durham to London.
Magnet	United Kingdom	The ship was wrecked on the Kentish Knock. Her crew were rescued. She was on a voyage from Sunderland, County Durham to Cowes, Isle of Wight.
Mary Ann	United Kingdom	The ship was wrecked off Islay, Inner Hebrides with the loss of all but one of her crew. She was on a voyage from Maryport, Cumberland to the Nith.

== 22 December ==
List of shipwrecks: 22 December 1838
Ship	State	Description
Activité	France	The ship ran aground on the coast of Jersey, Channel Islands. Her crew were rescued. She was on a voyage from Regnéville-sur-Mer, Manche to Jersey.
Commerce	United Kingdom	The ship was driven ashore at Great Yarmouth, Norfolk. She was refloated on 26 December and taken into Great Yarmouth.
Defiance	United Kingdom	The ship was driven ashore at Blakeney, Norfolk. She was on a voyage from Blakeney to Alloa, Clackmannanshire.
Friends	United Kingdom	The ship was driven ashore near Dover, Kent. She was on a voyage from Havana, Cuba to Amsterdam, North Holland, Netherlands. Friends was consequently condemned.
John Craig	United Kingdom	The ship was wrecked at the mouth of the River Foyle. Her crew were rescued. She was on a voyage from Workington, Cumberland to Londonderry.
Lively	United Kingdom	The ship was driven on to the Foreness Rock, near Margate, Kent. She was on a voyage from Guernsey, Channel Islands to London. Lively was later refloated and taken into Margate.
Napoleon	United Kingdom	Carrying 2000 piculs of Antimony ore, heavy seas swamped and then broke up the ship off the entrance of the Santubong river, Sarawak. Three lost. Survivors given food and shelter at Kuching, thanks to Raja Muda Hassim. Survivors transported to Singapore by the Spanish brig Pronto 96 days later.
Ocean	Netherlands	The ship was driven ashore at Tjilatjap, Netherlands East Indies. She was on a voyage from Tjilatjap to Amsterdam. .
Sarah	United Kingdom	The ship ran aground at Bideford, Devon.
Weser	Bremen	The ship was driven ashore at Sea Palling, Norfolk. She was on a voyage from Bremen to La Guayira, Venezuela. Weser was later refloated and taken into Great Yarmouth.

== 23 December ==
List of shipwrecks: 23 December 1838
Ship	State	Description
Clasina Theodora Fin	Netherlands	The ship was collision with an American vessel and subsequently ran aground on the Goodwin Sands, Kent, United Kingdom. She was on a voyage from Amsterdam, North Holland to Marseille, Bouches-du-Rhône, France. Clasina Theodora Fin was later refloated and taken into Margate, Kent.
Domus	United Kingdom	The ship sank in the North Sea off Winterton Ness, Norfolk.
Hannah	United Kingdom	The ship was driven ashore on the Cork Sand, in the North Sea off the coast of Essex. She was on a voyage from Hamburg to Liverpool, Lancashire. Hannah was later refloated and taken into Harwich, Essex.
John	United Kingdom	The ship foundered in the North Sea off Scarborough, Yorkshire. Her crew were rescued. She was on a voyage from Stockton-on-Tees, County Durham to London.
Mary Agnes	United Kingdom	The ship was driven ashore south of Mundesley, Norfolk. She was on a voyage from Hamburg to London. Mary Agnes was later refloated and taken into Great Yarmouth, Norfolk.
Prins Christian	Netherlands	The ship was driven ashore and wrecked 4 nautical miles (7.4 km) west of Dover, Kent. She was on a voyage from Havana, Cuba to Amsterdam.
Shannon Packet	United Kingdom	The ship was driven ashore on Scattery Island, County Clare. She was on a voyage from Limerick to Portsmouth, Hampshire. Shannon Packet was refloated the next day and taken into Kilrush, county Cork.

== 24 December ==
List of shipwrecks: 24 December 1838
Ship	State	Description
Arcadia	United Kingdom	The barque was abandoned in the Atlantic Ocean. Her crew were rescued by Rhoda (United Kingdom). Arcadia was on a voyage from Fernando Po, Brazil to London.
Armestad	France	The ship was wrecked with the loss of all but two of her crew.
Dygden	Russia	The ship was driven ashore at Beachy Head, Sussex, United Kingdom. She was on a voyage from Newcastle upon Tyne, Northumberland, United Kingdom to Messina, Sicily. Dygden was refloated but had lost her rudder. She was taken in tow on 27 December by HMRC Victoria ( Board of Customs) and arrived at The Downs.
George IV	United Kingdom	The ship ran aground on the Herd Sand, in the North Sea off the coast of County Durham. Her crew were rescued by the South Shields Lifeboat. George IV was refloated on 1 January 1839 and taken into South Shields, County Durham.
Hindostan (or Hindustan)	United Kingdom	The ship was wrecked near Omoa, British Honduras. She was on a voyage from Omoa to Belize, British Honduras.
Hoppet	Netherlands	The ship was driven ashore and wrecked at "Aradsberg". She was on a voyage from Rotterdam, South Holland to Bergen, Norway.
San Francisco de Panlo	Spain	The ship was abandoned whilst on a voyage from Ferrol to Barcelona. Her crew were rescued by Sollertla(flag unknown).
Vrow Gelees	Belgium	The ship was driven ashore near "Bradenburg". She was on a voyage from London to Antwerp.
Watson	United Kingdom	The ship ran aground on the Arklow Bank, in the Irish Sea off the coast of County Wicklow and sank. Her crew were rescued. She was on a voyage from Whitehaven, Cumberland to Cardiff, Glamorgan.

== 25 December ==
List of shipwrecks: 25 December 1838
Ship	State	Description
Champlain	United States	The ship was driven ashore in the Delaware River. She was on a voyage from Philadelphia, Pennsylvania to Madras and Calcutta, India. Champlain was refloated on 5 January 1839.
Cork Packet	United Kingdom	The smack capsized off St. Agnes, Cornwall with the loss of all hands.
Despatch	United Kingdom	The ship departed from Ipswich, Suffolk for Kirkcaldy, Fife. No further trace, presumed foundered in the North Sea with the loss of all hands.
Dorothea	United Kingdom	The ship was wrecked in the Cape Verde Islands. She was on a voyage from Cowes, Isle of Wight to Montevideo, Uruguay.
Morvion	United Kingdom	The ship was abandoned in the Atlantic Ocean. She was on a voyage from Trieste, to Glasgow, Renfrewshire. Morvion was subsequently driven ashore on Île Guémènia, Finistère, France.
Virginia	United States	The ship was driven ashore near Hellevoetsluis, Zeeland, Netherlands. She was on a voyage from Baltimore, Maryland to Rotterdam, South Holland, Netherlands. She was later refloated and taken into Hellevoetsluis.

== 26 December ==
List of shipwrecks: 26 December 1838
Ship	State	Description
Duke of York	Royal Navy	The brigantine was wrecked at St. Rous, Guadeloupe. Her crew and 144 passengers survived. She was on a voyage from Antigua to Barbados.
Hero	United Kingdom	The ship ran aground on the Whiting Sand, in the North Sea off the coast of Essex. She was on a voyage from Stockton-on-Tees, County Durham to London. Hero was refloated and taken into Harwich, Essex.
Hilda	United Kingdom	The ship ran aground on the Grain Spit, in the Thames Estuary. She was on a voyage from Stockton-on-Tees to Chatham, Kent.
Louisa	United Kingdom	The schooner was driven ashore and severely damaged at Hastings, Sussex. She was subsequently condemned.
Morven	United Kingdom	The ship was abandoned in the Atlantic Ocean. Her crew were rescued by Henriette (United Kingdom). Morven was on a voyage from Trieste to Glasgow, Renfrewshire. She was driven ashore on Molène, Finistère, France on 9 January 1839.
Norval	United Kingdom	The sloop was lost in Bluemull Sound, Shetland Islands. Her crew were rescued. She was on a voyage from Leith, Lothian to Lerwick, Shetland Islands.
Ocean	United Kingdom	The ship was driven ashore at Lowestoft, Suffolk. She was refloated on 29 December and taken into Lowestoft.
Prosperous	United Kingdom	The ship was driven ashore at Shoreham-by-Sea, Sussex. She was on a voyage from London to Shoreham-by-Sea. Prosperous was later refloated.
Queen Victoria	United Kingdom	The brig was driven ashore and severely damaged at Hastings. She was later repaired.
Sussex	United Kingdom	The sloop was driven ashore and severely damaged west of Hastings. She was later repaired.
William and Mary	United Kingdom	The ship was driven ashore at Shoreham-by-Sea. She was later refloated but found to be severely damaged.
William Pitt	United Kingdom	The sloop was driven ashore and severely damaged at Hastings. She was later repaired.

== 27 December ==
List of shipwrecks: 27 December 1838
Ship	State	Description
Berezawka	Russia	The ship sprang a leak in the Black Sea and was beached at "Carabournou". She was on a voyage from Odesa to Marseille, Bouches-du-Rhône, France.
Donnes	United Kingdom	The ship foundered in the North Sea off the coast of Norfolk.
La Desirée	French Navy	The 16-gun corvette was wrecked near Saint-Clément-des-Baleines, Île de Ré, Charente-Maritime with the loss of all on board, at least 69 lives. She was on a voyage from Brest, Finistère to Toulon, Var.

== 28 December ==
List of shipwrecks: 28 December 1838
Ship	State	Description
Elizabeth	United Kingdom	The brig ran aground on the Rolling Rocks, in the River Shannon. She was on a voyage from Limerick to Liverpool, Lancashire. Elizabeth was later refloated and resumed her voyage.
Liverpool	United Kingdom	The ship was driven ashore at New Orleans, Louisiana, United States.

== 29 December ==
List of shipwrecks: 29 December 1838
Ship	State	Description
Eleanor	United Kingdom	The steam tug sprang a leak sank in Liverpool Bay off Crosby Point, Lancashire.
Europe	United Kingdom	The ship ran aground between Bedloe's Island and Ellis Island, New York, United States. She was on a voyage from Liverpool, Lancashire to New York.
Mary	United Kingdom	The ship departed from Lowestoft, Suffolk for Newcastle upon Tyne, Northumberland. No further trace, presumed foundered with the loss of all hands.
Olivia	United Kingdom	The ship was driven ashore in the Droogden. She was on a voyage from Danzig to an English port.
Providence	United Kingdom	The ship sprang a leak and was run ashore south of Whitby, Yorkshire. Her crew were rescued.
Two Brothers	United Kingdom	The ship departed from Great Yarmouth, Norfolk for Alloa, Clackmannanshire. No further trace, presumed foundered in the North Sea with the loss of all hands.

== 30 December ==
List of shipwrecks: 30 December 1838
Ship	State	Description
Adelaide	United Kingdom	The ship was driven ashore in "Wedavall Bay, Orkney Islands. She was on a voyage from Arbroath, Forfarshire to Liverpool, Lancashire.
Agnes	United Kingdom	The ship was driven ashore at "Buny", Orkney Islands. She was on a voyage from Newcastle upon Tyne, Northumberland to Galway.
James	United Kingdom	The sloop was driven ashore and wrecked in Lunan Bay. Her crew were rescued.
Leopoldine	Bremen	The ship was driven ashore between Amrum and Föhr, Duchy of Schleswig. She was on a voyage from Riga, Russia to Bremen. Leopoldine was refloated on 21 January 1839.
Norval	United Kingdom	The schooner was driven ashore and sank at Hawksley Point, Northumberland. Her crew were rescued.
Olive Branch	United Kingdom	The ship was driven ashore on Islay, Inner Hebrides. She was on a voyage from London to Drogheda, County Louth. She was wrecked there on 7 January 1839.
Rival	United Kingdom	The brig was driven ashore at St. Ives, Cornwall. Her five crew were rescued. She was on a voyage from Liverpool to London. Rival was refloated the next day and taken into St. Ives.
William Simpson	United Kingdom	The schooner was driven ashore at Low Hauxley, Northumberland. She floated off and sank. Her crew were rescued. William Simpson was on a voyage from Sunderland, County Durham to Aberdeen.

== 31 December ==
List of shipwrecks: 31 December 1838
Ship	State	Description
Adelaide	United Kingdom	The ship was driven ashore in Widewall Bay, Orkney Islands. She was on a voyage from Arbroath, Forfarshire to Liverpool, Lancashire.
Helen	Trieste	The ship was wrecked on the west coast of North Uist, Outer Hebrides, United Kingdom. Her crew were rescued. She was on a voyage from Newcastle upon Tyne, Northumberland, United Kingdom to Trieste.
Perseverance	United Kingdom	The ship ran aground and was damaged at Sunderland, County Durham.

== Unknown date ==
List of shipwrecks: Unknown date in December 1838
Ship	State	Description
Amity	United Kingdom	The ship was driven ashore near Beaumaris, Anglesey. She was later refloated and put back to Liverpool, Lancashire.
Arcadia	United Kingdom	The barque was abandoned in the Atlantic Ocean (45°55′N 9°44′W) on or before 25 December. She was on a voyage from Fernando Po, Brazil to London.
Baron de Rosetti	Russia	The ship departed from Odesa during December. No further trace, presumed foundered with the loss of all hands.
Chiaoa	(United Kingdom of Great Britain and Ireland) British North America	The ship was abandoned in the Atlantic Ocean on or before 21 December.
Clipper	United Kingdom	The ship was driven ashore near Glynn, County Antrim before 12 December. She was on a voyage from the Clyde to Porto, Portugal. Clipper was later refloated and taken into Tarbert, Argyllshire.
Commerce	United Kingdom	The ship was driven ashore at Cromer, Norfolk. She was later refloated and taken into Great Yarmouth, Norfolk.
Earl of Moira	United Kingdom	The ship was wrecked in the Atlantic Ocean (45°00′N 21°54′W) on or before 19 December. At least five crew were found dead on the wreck.
Grace	United Kingdom	The ship was driven ashore near Schull, County Cork. She was on a voyage from Virginia, United States to Liverpool.
Harriet	(United Kingdom of Great Britain and Ireland) New South Wales	The schooner was wrecked at the mouth of the Macleay River. Her crew survived.
Hermione	French Navy	The Consolante-class frigate was wrecked off Bermuda. Her crew were rescued.
James	United Kingdom	The ship was wrecked near St. Agnes, Cornwall with the loss of all hands. She was on a voyage from Waterford to Penzance, Cornwall.
Jane	United Kingdom	The ship was wrecked near Holyhead, Anglesey. She was on a voyage from Holyhead to Liverpool.
Joseph	Norway	The brig was driven ashore crewless on Ouessant, Finistère, France.
Julie	Belgium	The ship was driven ashore at "Capellan" between 7 and 10 December. She was on a voyage from Antwerp to Bordeaux, Gironde, France. Julie was later refloated and put back to Antwerp.
Loyalist	United Kingdom	The ship was driven ashore on Gotland, Sweden in early December. Her crew were rescued. She was on a voyage from Saint Petersburg, Russia to London.
Morven	United Kingdom	The brig was abandoned in the Atlantic Ocean on or before 29 December.
Navarin	France	The ship was wrecked on Saona Island, Saint Domingo with the loss of two of her crew. She was on a voyage from Havre de Grâce, Seine-Inférieure to Saint Domingo.
Prosperous	United Kingdom	The ship was driven ashore at Shoreham-by-Sea, Sussex. She was refloated on 30 December.
Robert	United Kingdom	The ship was wrecked on the Attevon Rocks.
Santa Anna	Portugal	The schooner was in collision with Victor (France) off the Cordouan Lighthouse, Gironde, France. All on board were rescued by Victor. Santa Anna was on a voyage from Viana do Castelo to Bordeaux, Gironde. She subsequently came ashore on the Île d'Oleron, Charente-Maritime, France.
Severn	United Kingdom	The ship was abandoned in the Atlantic Ocean. Her crew were rescued by Russell (United Kingdom). Severn was on a voyage from Miramichi, New Brunswick, British North America to Bristol, Gloucestershire.
Superior	United Kingdom	The ship was driven ashore at St. Agnes, Cornwall. She was refloated on 30 December and taken into St. Ives, Cornwall.
Symmetry	United Kingdom	The ship was driven ashore at Point Escuminac, New Brunswick. She was on a voyage from Miramichi to London. Symmetry was consequently condemned.
Thomas	United Kingdom	The ship was wrecked near Hull, Yorkshire with the loss of all hands. She was on a voyage from Nassau, Bahamas to Liverpool.
William and Mary	United Kingdom	The ship was driven ashore and severely damaged at Shoreham-by-Sea. She was refloated on 30 December.
Wohlfart	Danzig	The ship was lost near La Tremblade, Charente-Maritime, France. She was on a voyage from Danzig to Bordeaux, Gironde, France.
