= HMS Hindustan =

Five ships of the Royal Navy have been named HMS Hindustan or Hindostan, after the old name for the Indian subcontinent:

- HMS Hindostan (1795) was a former East Indiaman by the same name and launched in 1789. The Admiralty purchased her in 1795 and classed her as a 54-gun fourth rate. She was converted into a storeship in 1802 and burned in an accident in 1804.
- HMS Hindostan (1804) was another former East Indiaman, previously named Admiral Rainier. She was purchased in 1804 and classed as a 50-gun fifth rate. She was converted into a 20-gun storeship in 1811, renamed HMS Dolphin in 1819, and HMS Justitia in 1831, when she became a convict ship. She was sold in 1855.
- HMS Hindustan (1841) was an 80-gun ship of the line launched in 1841. She became a training ship in 1868 and was renamed Fisgard III in 1905. She was renamed Hindostan in 1920 and was sold in 1921. Her timbers were used in the construction of Liberty's in London.
- HMS Hindustan (1903) was an 18-gun twin propeller pre-dreadnought battleship of the King Edward VII class. She was launched in 1903, sold in 1921 and scrapped in 1923. In 1911, the Prince of Wales served 3 months aboard as a junior midshipman.
- HMIS Hindustan (L80) was a Hastings-class sloop of the Royal Indian Marine launched in 1930. She was involved in The Royal Indian Navy Mutiny in 1946. She was sold to the Pakistani Navy in 1948 and renamed Karsaz. She was broken up in 1951.

Hindostan is now the name traditionally given to the static training ship permanently moored at the Britannia Royal Naval College, although the ship is not in commission and thus not prefixed as HMS. The current Hindostan was previously HMS Cromer, a Sandown-class minehunter that became the static training ship in 2002.

== See also ==
- Hindostan (East Indiaman)
- Hindostan (ship)
