= Khariboli =

Khariboli or Khari Boli ("standing dialect") may refer to any of these Indo-Aryan language varieties of Delhi and surrounding regions of northern India:

- Old Hindi, also known as Khariboli, the earliest stage of the Hindustani language, spoken in the 10th–13th centuries
- Hindustani language, a Central Indo-Aryan language descended from Old Hindi, with Hindi and Urdu as its registers
- Kauravi dialect, also known as Khariboli, the Delhi dialect of Hindustani

== See also ==
- Hindi (disambiguation)
