= Hindostan (East Indiaman) =

Three East Indiamen of the East India Company (EIC), have borne the name Hindostan, after the old name for the Indian subcontinent:

- HMS Hindostan (1795) was a former East Indiaman by the same name built by William Barnard at Deptford and launched in 1789. The Admiralty purchased her in 1795 and classed her as a 54-gun fourth rate. She was converted into a storeship in 1802 and burned in an accident in 1804.
- Hindostan (1796 Indiaman) was launched in 1796 and made three trips to the Far East. She was wrecked while outbound in 1803.
- Hindostan was launched in 1813 and brought into the Royal Navy as HMS Buffalo that same year. She later served as a convict ship and as transport for immigrants to Australia before being wrecked in 1840.

== See also ==
- Hindostan (ship)
- HMS Hindustan
