= Islam in Turkmenistan =

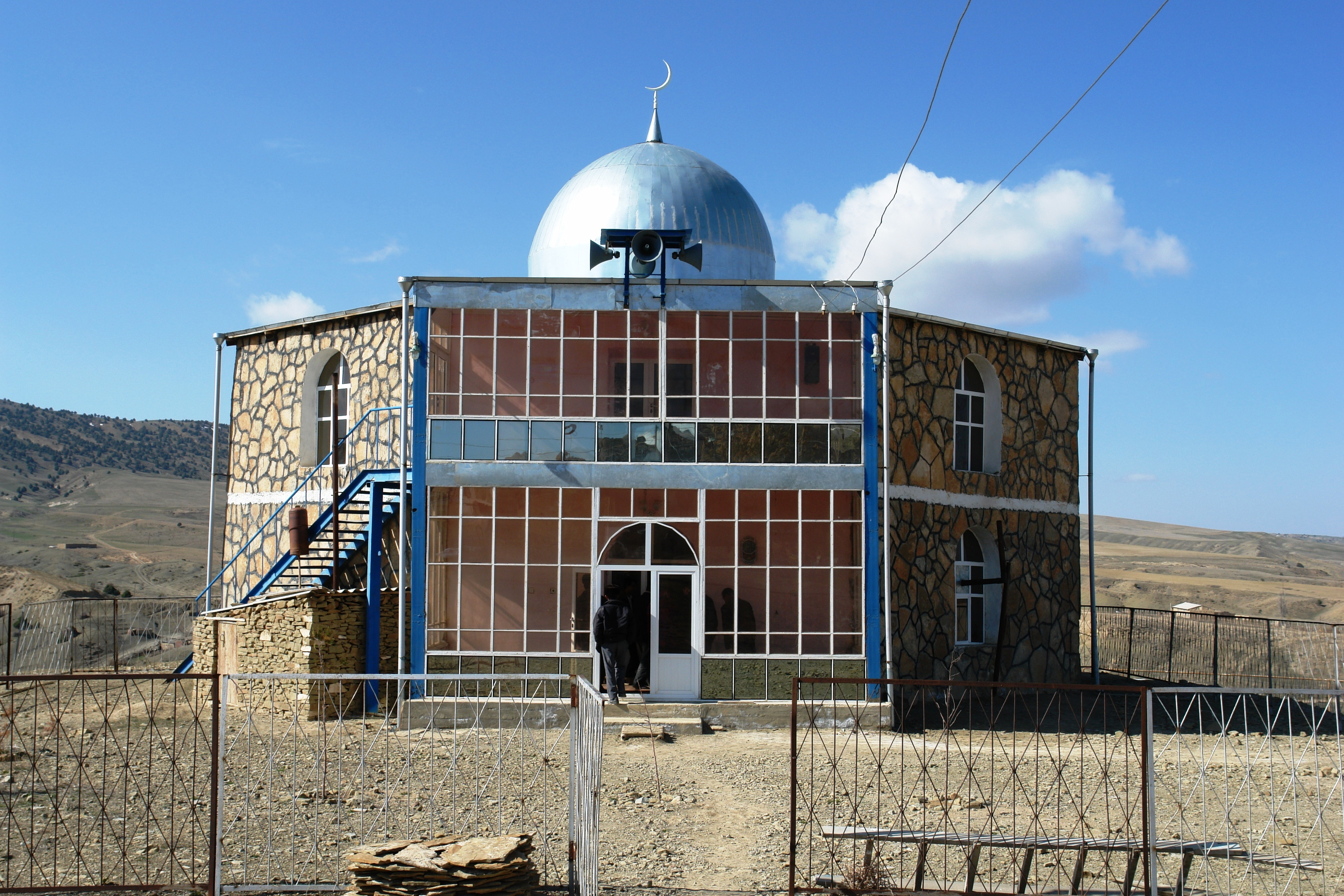
Central Mosque in Kone-Gummez village, Nohur area.

According to a 2020 report, 95.8% of Turkmenistan's population is Muslim. Traditionally, the Turkmen of Turkmenistan, like their kin in Uzbekistan and Afghanistan are Sunni Muslims. Shia Muslims, the other main branch of Islam, are not numerous in Turkmenistan, and the Shia religious practices of the Azerbaijani and Kurdish minorities are not politicized. The great majority of Turkmen readily identify themselves as Muslims and acknowledge Islam as an integral part of their cultural heritage, but some support a revival of the religion's status primarily as an element of national revival.

== History and structure ==
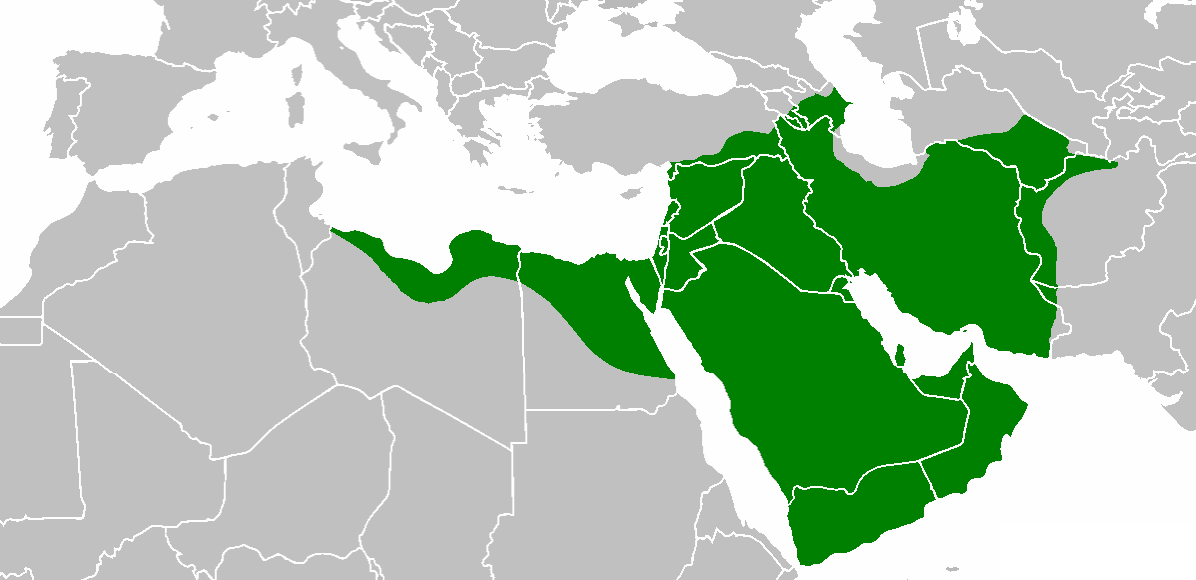
Caliph Umar's empire at its peak in 644

Islam was introduced to Turkmenistan during the period of Islamic conquest by the second and third Rashidun Caliphs, Umar and Uthman.

Integrated within the Turkmen tribal structure is the "holy" tribe called övlat. Ethnographers consider the övlat, of which six are active, as a revitalized form of the ancestor cult injected with Sufism. According to their genealogies, each tribe descends from Muhammad through one of the Four Caliphs. Because of their belief in the sacred origin and spiritual powers of the övlat representatives, Turkmen accord these tribes a special, holy status. In the eighteenth and nineteenth centuries, the övlat tribes became dispersed in small, compact groups in Turkmenistan. They attended and conferred blessings on all important communal and life-cycle events, and also acted as mediators between clans and tribes. The institution of the övlat retains some authority today. Many of the Turkmen who are revered for their spiritual powers trace their lineage to an övlat, and it is not uncommon, especially in rural areas, for such individuals to be present at life-cycle and other communal celebrations.

=== Islam in the Soviet Era ===
In the Soviet era, all religious beliefs were attacked by the communist authorities as superstition and "vestiges of the past." Most religious schooling and religious observance were banned, and the vast majority of mosques were closed. An official Muslim Board of Central Asia with headquarters in Tashkent was established during World War II to supervise Islam in Central Asia. For the most part, the Muslim Board functioned as an instrument of propaganda whose activities did little to enhance the Muslim cause. Atheist indoctrination stifled religious development and contributed to the isolation of the Turkmen from the international Muslim community. Some religious customs, such as Muslim burial and male circumcision, continued to be practiced throughout the Soviet period, but most religious belief, knowledge, and customs were preserved only in rural areas in "folk form" as a kind of unofficial Islam not sanctioned by the state-run Spiritual Directorate.

== Religion after independence ==
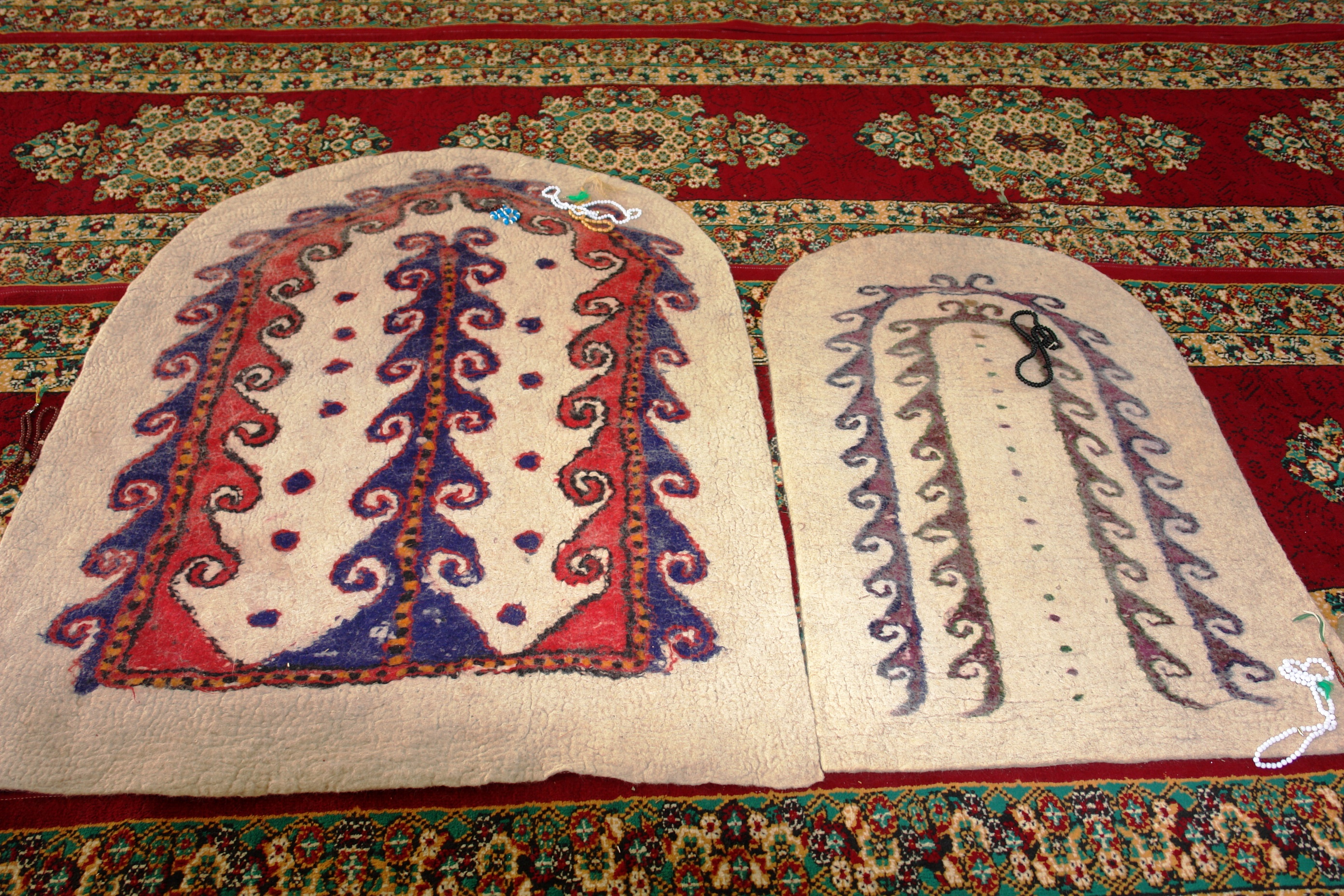
Prayer rugs inside a Nohur mosque.

The current government oversees official Islam through a structure inherited from the Soviet period. Turkmenistan's Muslim Religious Board, together with that of Uzbekistan, constitutes the Muslim Religious Board of Mavarannahr. The Mavarannahr Board is based in Tashkent and exerts considerable influence in appointments of religious leaders in Turkmenistan. The governing body of Islamic judges (Kaziat) is registered with Turkmenistan's Ministry of Justice, and a council of religious affairs under the Cabinet of Ministers monitors the activities of clergy. Individuals who wish to become members of the official clergy must attend official religious institutions; a few, however, may prove their qualifications simply by taking an examination.

Some Turkmen do not regularly attend mosque services or publicly demonstrate adherence, except through participation in officially sanctioned national traditions associated with Islam on a popular level, including life-cycle events such as weddings, burials, and pilgrimages. Since 1990, efforts have been made to regain some of the cultural heritage lost under Soviet rule. Former president Saparmurat Niyazov, who ruled Turkmenistan from 1991 until his death in 2006, issued orders that basic Islamic principles be taught in public schools. More religious institutions, including religious schools and mosques, have appeared including those built with the support of Saudi Arabia, Kuwait, and Turkey. Religious classes are held in both schools and mosques, with instruction in Arabic, the Qur'an and the hadith, and history of Islam.

The Ertuğrul Gazi Mosque in Ashgabat named after the founder of the Ottoman Empire.

Turkmenistan's government stresses its secular nature and its support of freedom of religious belief, as embodied in the 1991 Law on Freedom of Conscience and on Religious Organizations in the Turkmen Soviet Socialist Republic and institutionalized in the 1992 constitution. That document guarantees the separation of church and state; it also removes any legal basis for Islam to play a role in political life by prohibiting proselytizing, the dissemination of "unofficial" religious literature, discrimination based on religion, and the formation of religious political parties. In addition, the government reserves the right to appoint and dismiss anyone who teaches religious matters or who is a member of the clergy. Since independence, the Islamic leadership in Turkmenistan has been more assertive, but in large part it still responds to government control. The official governing body of religious judges gave its official support to President Niyazov in the June 1992 elections.

Some Muslim leaders are opposed to the secular form of government, especially one controlled by former Communists. Some official leaders and teachers working outside the official structure have vowed to increase the population's knowledge of Islam, its role in society, and broaden adherence to its tenets. Alarmed that such activism may alienate Orthodox Slavs, the government has drawn up plans to elevate the council of religious affairs to ministry status in an effort to regulate religious activities more tightly.

== See also ==
- Religion in Turkmenistan
- Islam in Central Asia
