= Hindawi =

Hindawi or Hindavi can refer to:

- Hindustani language (Hindi-Urdu), Central Indo-Aryan languages, or any language of the Hindi Belt
- Something of, from, or related to Hind or Hindustan (another name of India)
- Hindawi Programming System, a suite of open source Indic-text programming languages
- Hindawi (publisher), publisher of open access journals

== People ==
- David Hindawi (born 1944), American software entrepreneur
- Nezar Hindawi, Jordanian convicted for plotting to bomb an airplane, see Hindawi affair
- Khairi Al-Hindawi (1885–1957), Iraqi politician and poet
- Khalil al-Hindawi (1906– 1976), Syrian writer and poet
- Orion Hindawi (born 1980), American software entrepreneur

== See also ==
- Hindi (disambiguation)
- Hindavi Swarajya
