= Hindi (disambiguation) =

Hindi commonly refers to Modern Standard Hindi, an Indo-Aryan language spoken in North India.

Hindi may also refer to:

== Language ==
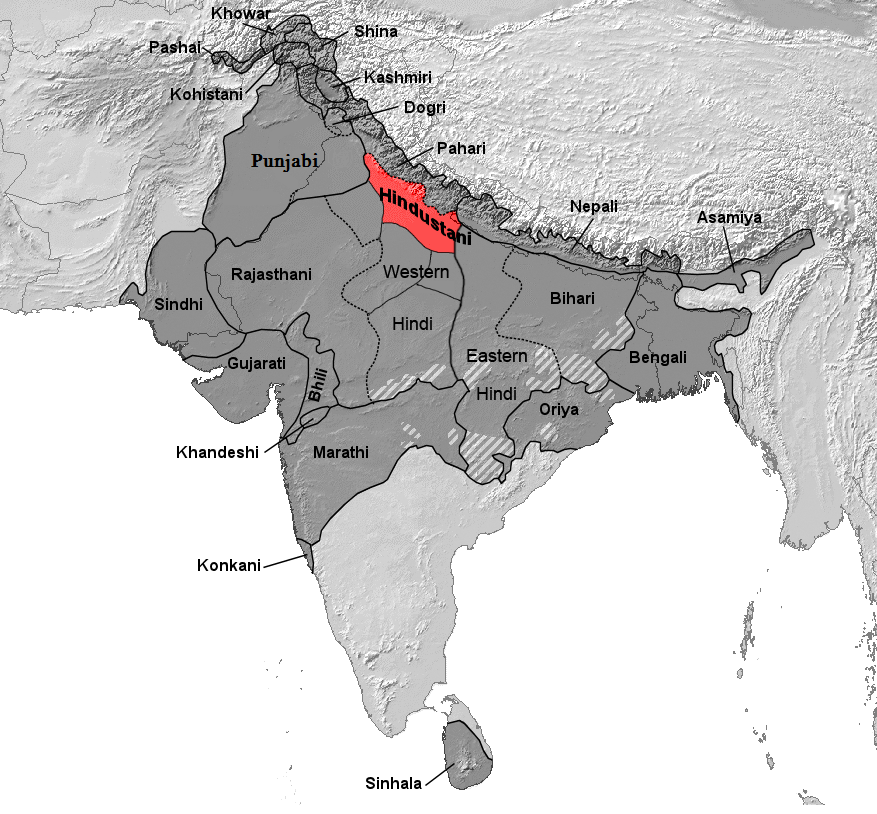
Hindustani proper (red). Dark grey are the other Indo-Aryan languages.

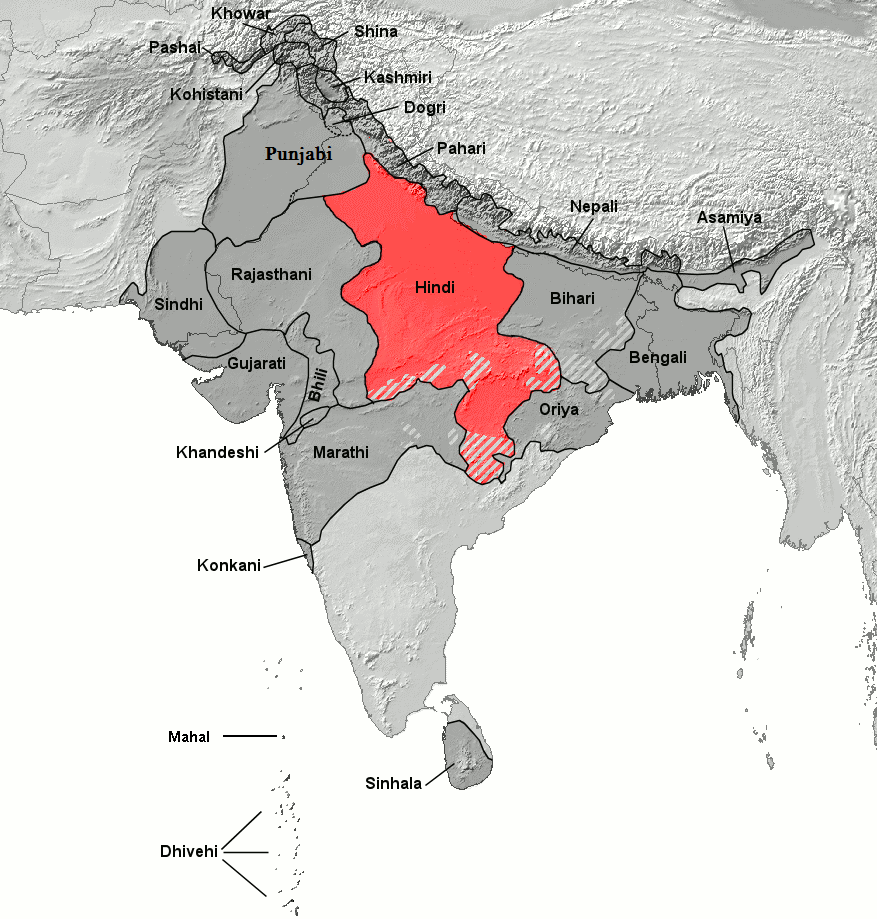
An intermediate scope: Central Indo-Aryan languages.

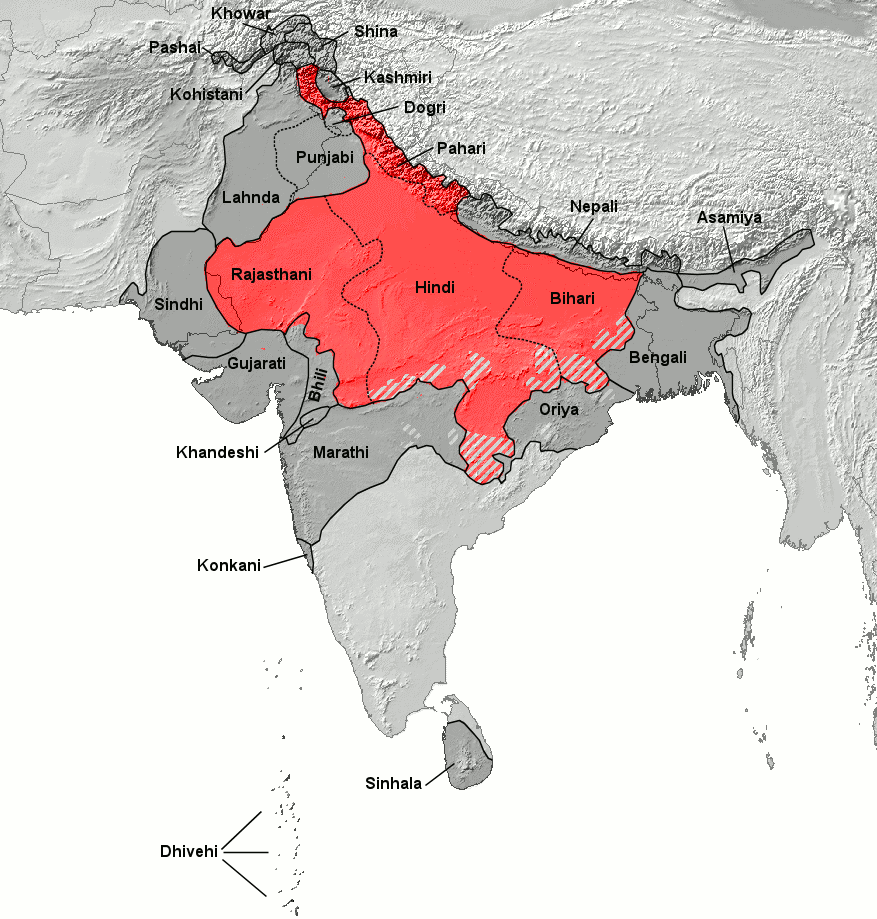
The broadest scope: the Hindi Belt.

- In a slightly broader sense, Hindustani language, the lingua franca of northern India and Pakistan
- In an intermediate sense, Central Indo-Aryan languages, also called Hindi languages
- In the widest sense, the languages of the Hindi Belt, including varieties of Bihari, Rajasthani, and Pahari
- Bombay Hindi, spoken in Mumbai
- Fiji Hindi, spoken by Indo-Fijians
- Caribbean Hindustani, spoken by Indo-Caribbean people and the Indo-Caribbean diaspora

== People with the name ==
- Abdulbasit Hindi (born 1997), Saudi Arabian football player
- Abdul-Ghaffar Hasan Al-Hindi (1913–2007), Pakistani scholar
- Ahmad Hindi (1800–1869), Iranian cleric
- Ahmad Hindi (athlete) (born 1995), Jordanian Paralympic athlete
- Amin al-Hindi (1940–2010), Palestinian intelligence chief
- Ayman Al-Hindi (born 1986), Palestinian football player
- Baba Ratan Hindi, legendary figure of early Islam
- Hanadi Zakaria al-Hindi (born 1978), Saudi Arabian pilot
- Hani al-Hindi (1927–2016), Syrian politician and activist
- Ibrahim Bu Hindi (born 1948), Bahraini journalist and writer
- Ignatius Simon II Hindi Zora (1754–1838), Syrian patriarch
- Joseph V Augustine Hindi (18th–19th c.), Chaldean Catholic patriarch
- Al-Muttaqi al-Hindi (1472–1567), Islamic scholar
- Nadia Al-Hindi (born 1972), Jordanian tennis player
- Safi al-Din al-Hindi, 13th-century scholar
- Steve Hindi (born 1950s), American activisit and businessman
- Wael El Hindi (born 1980), Egyptian squash player
- Yahya El Hindi (born 1998), Lebanese football player
- Hindi Zahra (born 1979), Moroccan singer and actress

== Other uses ==
- Turkish word for turkey (bird)

== See also ==
- Hind (disambiguation)
- Hindustan (disambiguation)
- Hindustani (disambiguation)
- Hindawi (disambiguation)
- Hindi literature
- Hindi cinema
