= Hindustan (disambiguation) =

Hindustan is a term currently used as an endonym for the modern day Republic of India, and historically used for parts of the subcontinent.

Hindustan or Hindostan may also refer to:

== Newspapers ==
- Hindustan (newspaper), also known as Dainik Hindustan, a Hindi-language daily newspaper
- Hindustan Times, an Indian English language daily newspaper, with focus on North India

== Places ==
- Republic of India, a South Asian country
- Hindustan, Indiana, United States, a town south of Martinsville, Indiana
- Hindostan Falls, Indiana

== Other uses ==
- Hindustan Motors, an Indian automotive manufacturer
- Hindostan (ship), several ships named Hindostan or Hindustan
- Hindoostan (Battle honour), a battle honour awarded to regiments of the British Army for their service during the conquest of British India between 1780 and 1823

== See also ==
- Aaj Ka Hindustan (lit. 'Today's India'), a 1940 Indian film by Jayant Desai
- Sher-E-Hindustan (disambiguation)
- Hindustani (disambiguation)
- Hind (disambiguation)
- Hindi (disambiguation)
