= Babakhanov =

Babakhanov is a surname derived from the name Babakhan. The feminine form transliterated from Russian is Babakhanova. The surname may refer to:

- Ari Babakhanov (born 1934), Uzbekistani musician
- Dzhurakhon Babakhanov, Kazakh footballer
- Yevgeny Yozhikov-Babakhanov (1942–2023), Soviet-Kazakh politician

== See also ==
- Babakhanyan
