= Babakhanyan =

Babakhanyan or Babakhanian is an Armenian surname derived from the Central Asian name Babakhan. It may refer to:

- Arakel Babakhanian, commonly known as Leo (1860–1932), Armenian historian, publicist, writer, critic and professor
- Armen Babakhanian, Armenian pianist
- David Babakhanyan (born 1975), Armenian film director, producer and screenwriter
- Hovhannes Babakhanyan (born 1968), Armenian-American actor and singer

== See also ==
- Babakhanov
