= Muhammad Sadik Muhammad Yusuf =

Uzbek Muslim scholar

Sheikh Muhammad Sadik Muhammad Yusuf
- Sheikh Muhammad Sodiq Muhammad Yusuf
- Born: 15 April 1952 (21 Rajab 1371 BH); Andijan, Uzbek SSR, Soviet Union
- Died: March 10, 2015 (aged 62); Tashkent, Uzbekistan
- Education: Mir-i Arab madrassa
- Scientific career
- Institutions: Spiritual Administration of the Muslims of Central Asia and Kazakhstan

Sheikh Muhammad Sadik Muhammad Yusuf (15 April 1952 - 10 March 2015) was an Uzbek Muslim scholar born in the region of Andijan.

== Life ==
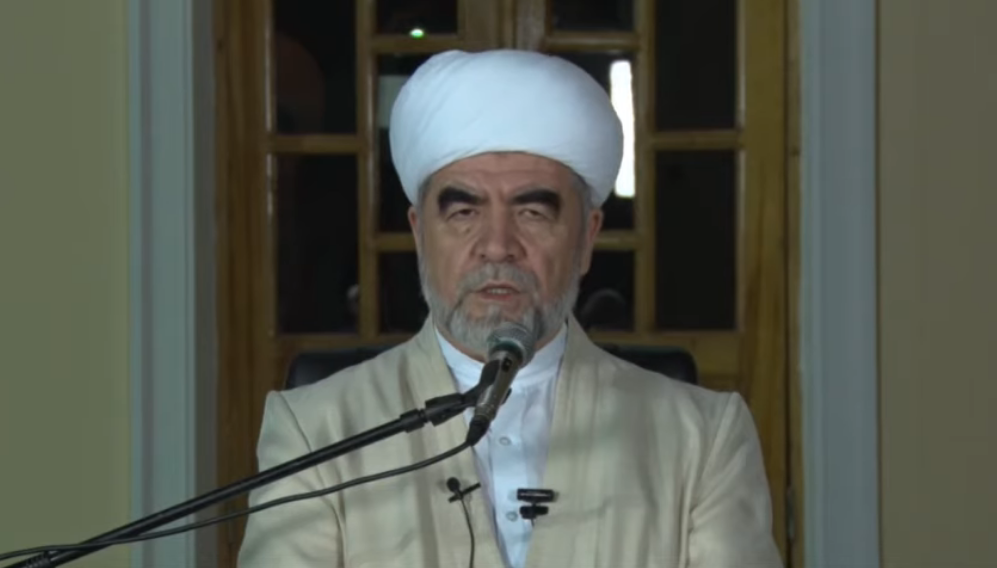
Sheikh Muhammad Sadik Muhammad Yusuf. 2014.

Sheikh Muhammad Sadik was the son of Muhammad-Yusuf (who died in 2004), who was the son of Muhammad-Ali, a scholar from Andijan. From 1989, he was the mufti of the Spiritual Administration of the Muslims of Central Asia and Kazakhstan. He was Uzbekistan’s first mufti after independence, until 1993.

Sheikh Muhammad Sadik was a member of the International Union of Muslim Scholars (IUMS), a non-governmental organization of Islamic scholars.

== Biography ==
Sheikh Muhammad Sadik received his primary religious education from his father. After finishing middle school in 1970, he attended the Mir-i Arab madrassa in Bukhara.

Sheikh Muhammad Sadik then studied at the Tashkent Islamic Institute in Tashkent, finishing with distinction in 1975. He then edited the journal, Muslims of the east of the Soviet Union.

In 1976, Sheikh Muhammad Sadik was admitted to ad-Dawa al-Islami National Islamic University in Libya, which he finished with distinction and a financial award. This period of study exposed him to a future generation of Muslim imams, mostly from the Arabic world but even reaching to places as far away as Japan.

Sheikh Muhammad Sadik served as deputy rector and then rector of the al-Bukhari institute in Tashkent, before being appointed mufti and head of the Spiritual Administration of the Muslims of Central Asia and Kazakhstan (SADUM) in February 1989, and in the same year he was elected as a deputy to the Supreme Soviet of the USSR. Sheikh presented a report to the former Soviet Union President Mikhail Gorbachev explaining the problems of Muslims rights in the protocol. He asked to return Muslims their rights to pray, to learn the religion.

In Sheikh Muhammad Sadik's meeting with Gorbachev, positive changes have been seen in the policy towards the religion in the communist regime. With Sheikh Muhammad Sodiq’s efforts, numerous mosques and madrassas were built in the Soviet Union. The Muslims were allowed to follow their religious traditions and ceremonies.

In 1997 Sheikh Muhammad Sadik was put in charge of Muslim countries and federations of the Commonwealth of Independent States within Rabita al-Alam al-Islami (Muslim World League), an international Islamic organization in Saudi Arabia. He was a permanent member of the governing council of this organization.

== Death ==
Sheikh Muhammad Sadik died on 10 March 2015 after suffering a heart attack.

== Writings ==
Writings include approximately 200 books covering almost all aspects of Islam. From 1994 to 2000, Sheikh Muhammad Sadik published approximately thirty popular articles and twenty-five books and pamphlets. Most were written in Uzbek, and some were translated into Russian. The main publisher was the Kara Su branch of the press of the Islamic cultural center in Osh.

Sheikh Muhammad Sadik's books include: Tafsiri Hilal (Translation and interpretation of the meanings of the Glorious Qur'an, in 6 volumes), Hadith wa Hayot (Hadith and life, series of books talking about the history and all details of Islam systematically in details, history of all prophets.., around in 40 volumes.), Ruhiy tarbiya (Spiritual attitude development/education, 3 volumes), Kifoya (books on fiqh (Islamic law) 3 volumes), and many other books, booklets, audio and video materials in Islam and translations of Imam Al-Bukhari's famous books into Uzbek language.

In his books since 2002, Sheikh Muhammad Sadik included the following credo at the beginning, in the style of an Islamic movement that is seeking to transcend the divisions within the faith:

Our motto: We aspire toward a true faith, toward a pure Islam, we desire to study the Qur'an and Sunna in order to follow them, and we want to spread the study of Islam. We want to follow the true mujtahids—the blessed ancestors (as-Salaf as-Salihun); we want to spread toleration and brotherhood (of Muslims). We also want to eradicate religious illiteracy and to put a stop to our contradictions and splits, to purge our fanaticism, and our sinful affairs.
