= Ibrahim Bu Hindi =

Bahraini poet and playwright

Ibrahim Buhindi
- إبراهيم بوهندي
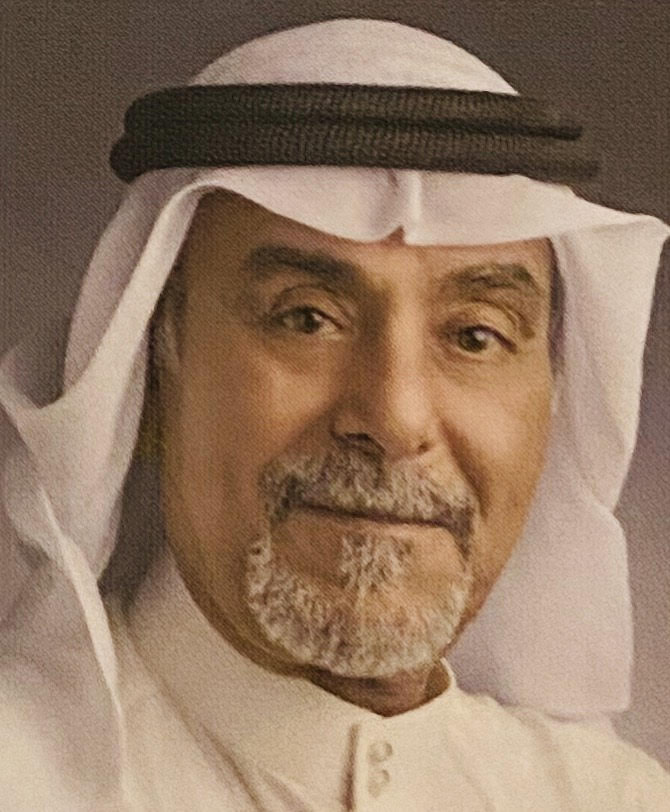
- Born: 1948 (age 77–78); Muharraq
- Education: diploma degree in commerce
- Notable work: hal yujifu alqalb, Srour
- Children: Rodaina , Juhayna, Muhannad, Munther, and Mohammed.

Ibrahim Buhindi (1948) (Arabic: إبراهيم بوهندي) is a Bahraini contemporary journalist, poet, and playwright. He was born in Muharraq. He obtained a diploma degree in commerce from Bahrain schools. He has worked as a banking employee since 1968. He held the position of Assistant general manager, Treasury and Investment, at the National Bank of Bahrain and Kuwait. He is a member of the Bahraini Family of Writers and the Bahraini Awal Theater. He has many collections and poetry plays, in addition to several newspaper articles.

== Early life ==
Ibrahim Bu Hindi was born in 1948 in Muharraq (or as it's said in Farij al-Fadel) and he grew up there. He studied in its schools until he completed his secondary education in the commercial department and obtained a diploma degree in commerce.

He has worked in the banking industry since 1968 and worked for the National Bank of Bahrain and Kuwait as Assistant Director for Treasury and Investment.

He is a member of the Bahraini Family of Writers and he was appointed as the president of the organization since 30 April 2018. He is also a member of the Bahraini Awal Theater. He began publishing his poems with the beginning of the expansion of the new Bahraini literary movement, and the rise of the Bahraini Family of Writers in it in the late 1960s. He wrote poetry in eloquent and colloquial forms, and newspapers in the Persian Gulf region published a lot of his poetry. He also participated in literary seminars. He was interested in vernacular poetry plays. He has also written many press articles in various Bahraini newspapers, expressing his social and political views, especially those related to the reality of life in Arab countries in the Persian Gulf region. He has expressed his objection to what has been called the Arab Spring because he believes that it contributed to the balkanization and fragmentation of the Arab countries.

== Personal life ==
His children are: Rudayna, Juhayna, Muhannad, Munther, and Mohammad.

== Awards ==
1978: He won the second prize for the poetry play, Ministry of Information, for his play “Does the heart dry” (original text: hal yujifu alqalb).

== Works ==
Collections of poetry:

Dreams of Najma Ghobsha Works Collections of poetry:

Dreams of Najma Ghobsha (original text: 'ahlam najmat alghabsha), in the Bahraini colloquial dialect, 1975 I testify that I love (original text: 'ashhad annny 'uhibu), 1978 Alwatisa, 1994 Ghazal altarida, 1994 The breakout of Mr. Slaughter (original text: qiam alsyd aldhabih)

Poetic plays: If time obey you, (original text: 'iidha ma taeak alzaman) 1973 pleasure (original text: Srour), 1974 Does the heart dry out, (original text: hal yujifu alqalb) 1987

Some of the biographies that he composed: Facilities: The Biography of Leadership and Brilliance,(original text: altashylat: sirat riadat wataluq), 2017
