= Muhammadjan Hindustani =

Muhammadjan Hindustani (born in 1892 in Chorbogh, Tajikistan) was an Islamist teacher in Uzbekistan during the Soviet era. He was a teacher of Abduvali qori Mirzayev, who taught Tohir Yoʻldosh and Juma Namangani. Yuldash and Namangani both became leaders of the Islamic Movement of Uzbekistan. Sayid Abdulloh Nuri and Muhammad Sharif Himmatzoda, who were leaders of the Islamic Renaissance Party of Tajikistan, were also students of Hindustani's. Hindustani was arrested by the Soviets, and he died in prison.

During the early 1970s, Hindustani founded a clandestine madrassa in Dushanbe. It was influenced by the ideology of Muslim Brotherhood founder Hassan al-Banna, as well as the Deobandi movement of India.

Hindustani considered some of his students "Wahhabist" — Hindustani used the term Wahhabist for anyone who introduces non-traditional interpretations of the Quran. He may denounced Ziyaudin Bobokhon as a Wahhabist for issuing fatwas that differed from traditional Hanafi interpretations; Bobokhon responded by removing Hindustani from the Council of Ulema of SADUM. Some scholars have used Wahhabist in this sense to describe the ulema in the Ferghana Valley and Tajikistan who diverged from the orthodox traditions of Hanafi Islam. One of these students, Rahmatullah Alloma from Kokand, Uzbekistan died in an automobile accident in 1981. Alloma and Abduvali Qori had both studied for six months under Hakimjan-Qori Marghiloni, who was considered the father of neo-Wahhabism by Hanafi scholars in the Ferghana Valley before studying under Hindustani for another year and a half.
