= Baba Khan =

Baba Khan باباخان
- Village
- Location within Iran
- Coordinates: 36°10′44″N 47°43′15″E
- Country: Iran
- Province: Kurdistan
- County: Bijar
- Bakhsh: Korani
- Rural District: Korani

Population (2006)
  - Total: 84
- Time zone: UTC+3:30 (IRST)
  - Summer (DST): UTC+4:30 (IRDT)

Baba Khan (Persian: باباخان, also Romanized as Bābā Khān) is a village in Korani Rural District, Korani District, Bijar County, Kurdistan province, Iran. At the 2006 census, its population was 84, in 16 families. The village is populated by Azerbaijanis.
