= Hindistani =

- Created by: Aws Al Sharqi
- Written by: Usama Al Sharqi
- Directed by: Aws Al Sharqi
- Starring: Bashir Al Ganem, Asad Zahrani, Malayeen
- Original language: Arabic
- No. of seasons: 2
- No. of episodes: 43

Production
- Producers: Khulud Abu Homos, Aws Alsharqi
- Running time: 30 minutes (1st series); 60 minutes (2nd series)

Original release
- Network: OSN YaHala!
- Release: 2011 – present

Hindistani is an Arabic-language comedy series telecast on OSN YaHala! during Ramadan. The series chronicles the efforts of a hapless Saudi Arabian youth to woo and marry a beautiful Indian woman, while also holding down a steady job. The series is inspired by Bollywood and much of it is shot in India.

== Characters ==
- Suiedan (Bashir Al Ganem)
- Asad (Asad Zahrani)
- Hind (Malayeen)
- Suiedan's father
- Obeid, Suiedan's brother
- Fawaz, Suiedan's cousin
- Samira
- Ghanem, the merchant
- Badr

== Awards ==
- 2012 Best Series Digital Studio Award
- 2012 Best Concept Digital Studio Award
