= Nohur =

Nohur Nohur obasy
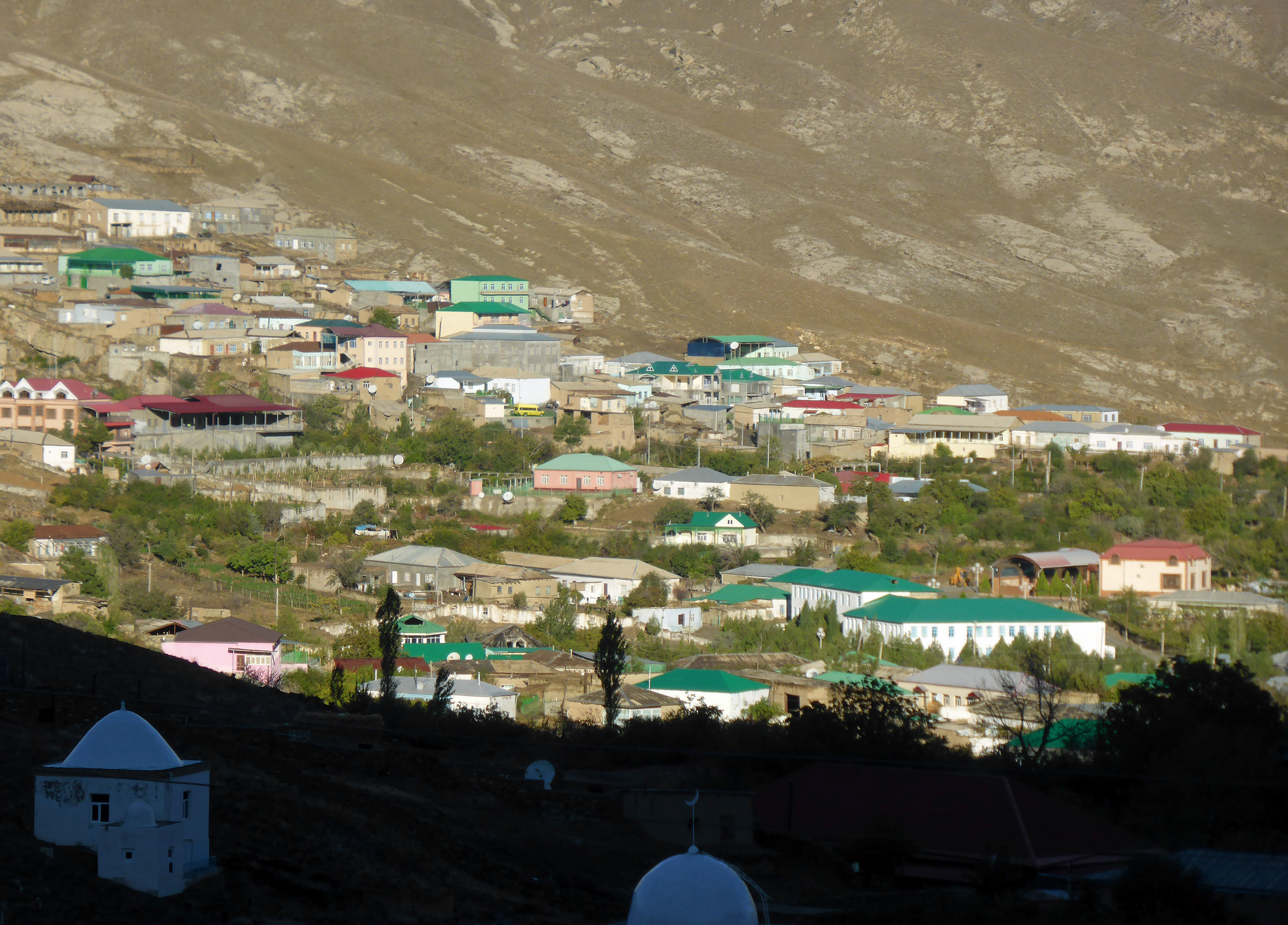

- Location in Turkmenistan
- Coordinates: 38°28′52″N 57°2′.5″E
- Country: Turkmenistan
- Province: Ahal Province
- District: Bäherden District
- Rural council: Nohur geňeşligi

Population (2022 official census)
  - Total: 6,258
- Time zone: UTC+5

Nohur (romanized Russian Cyrillic Nokhur) is a village in Bäherden District, Ahal Province, Turkmenistan. It is the only village and the seat of its rural council. The area is known for sacred places connected to the Persian legend of the Peri, most notably the Gyz-bibi cave. In 2022, it had a population of 6,258 people.

== Etymology ==
According to the Government of Turkmenistan, the etymological origin is disputed, with some locals believing it derived from Noah (many places in the region carry Biblical names) and some from the Peri themselves, as "no" and "hur" can be translated as "nine peri". Soltanşa Atanyýazow noted in his dictionary of Turkmen place names,

Nohur is an ethnic name. The local elders interpret the meaning of the word in two ways as "the place of the nine beauties" (in Persian no is "nine" and huri is "beautiful girl") and "the place of Noah's son Nohur". In Persian, the word nohur is a plural of the word nahr, meaning "throats".

Another source asserts that the name is derived from two Persian words meaning "ten donkeys", alluding to the putative arrival of the village's original settlers on donkeys.

== People ==
Far away from Turkmen mainland, Soviet modernization hardly penetrated into the village and traditional lifestyle flows unabated among the local tribe—Nohurli. They consider themselves to be descendants of the legionnaires of Alexander the Great — a stone is said to preserve the footprint of Alexander's horse.

=== Language ===
Nohur, a Turkmen dialect is spoken.

== Tourism ==
Nohur remains a popular destination for trekkers — the Çandybil Tourist Center is located halfway between Nohur and Garawul.

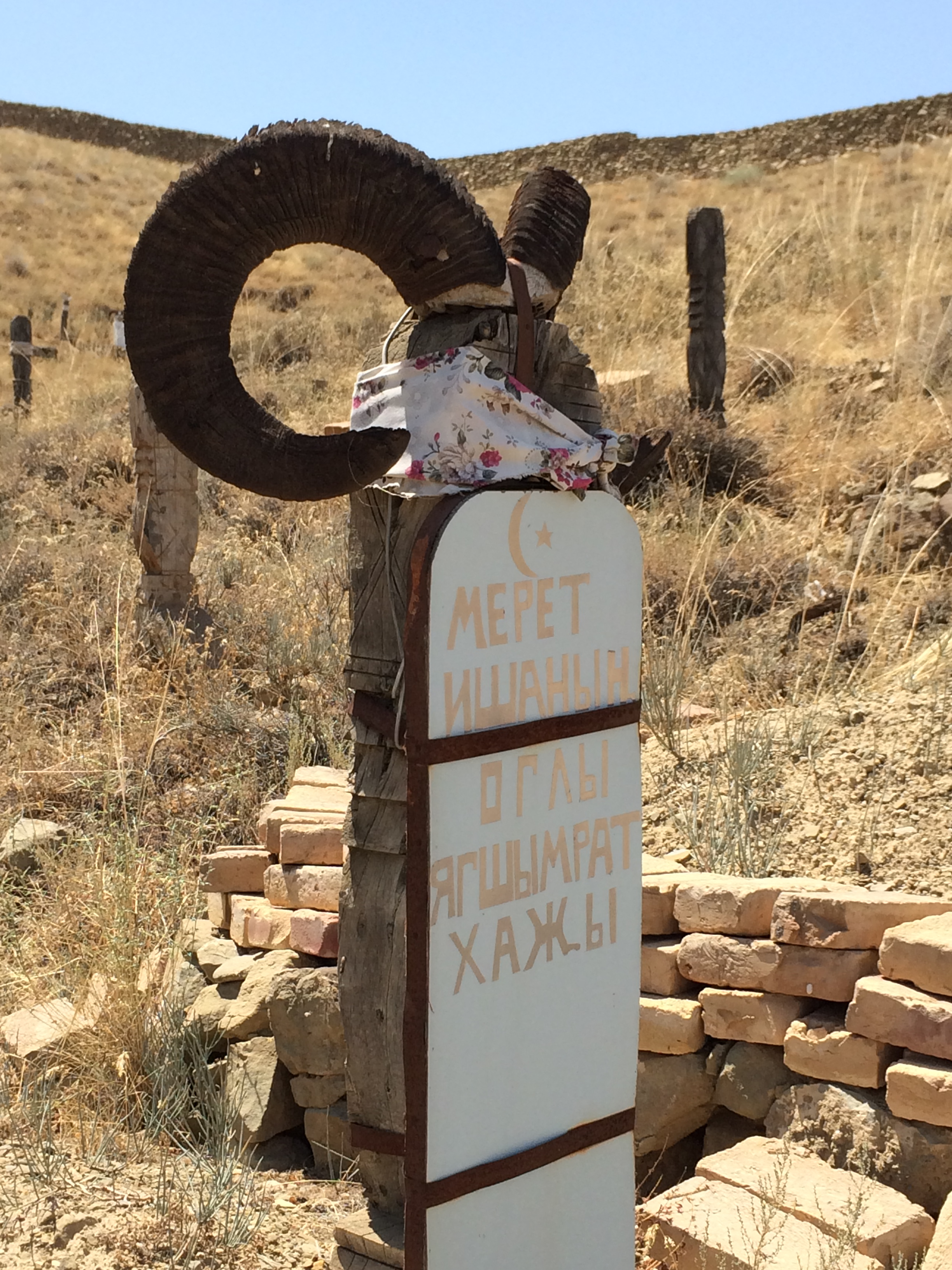
Headstone topped by ram's horns in Nohur, Turkmenistan

A graveyard with headstones decorated with the horns of rams is peculiar to Nohur. Just beyond, lies a cave-shrine dedicated to Kyz Bibi. About 5 kilometres (3.1 mi) from the Center, is the Khur-Khuri Waterfall flowing into a tree-filled gorge. The Ai Dere Canyon, some 7 kilometres (4.3 mi) from the Center, is a popular tourist spot with the many interspersing waterfalls generating plunge pools; the stream at the floor is a tributary of Sumbar River.

== Gallery ==
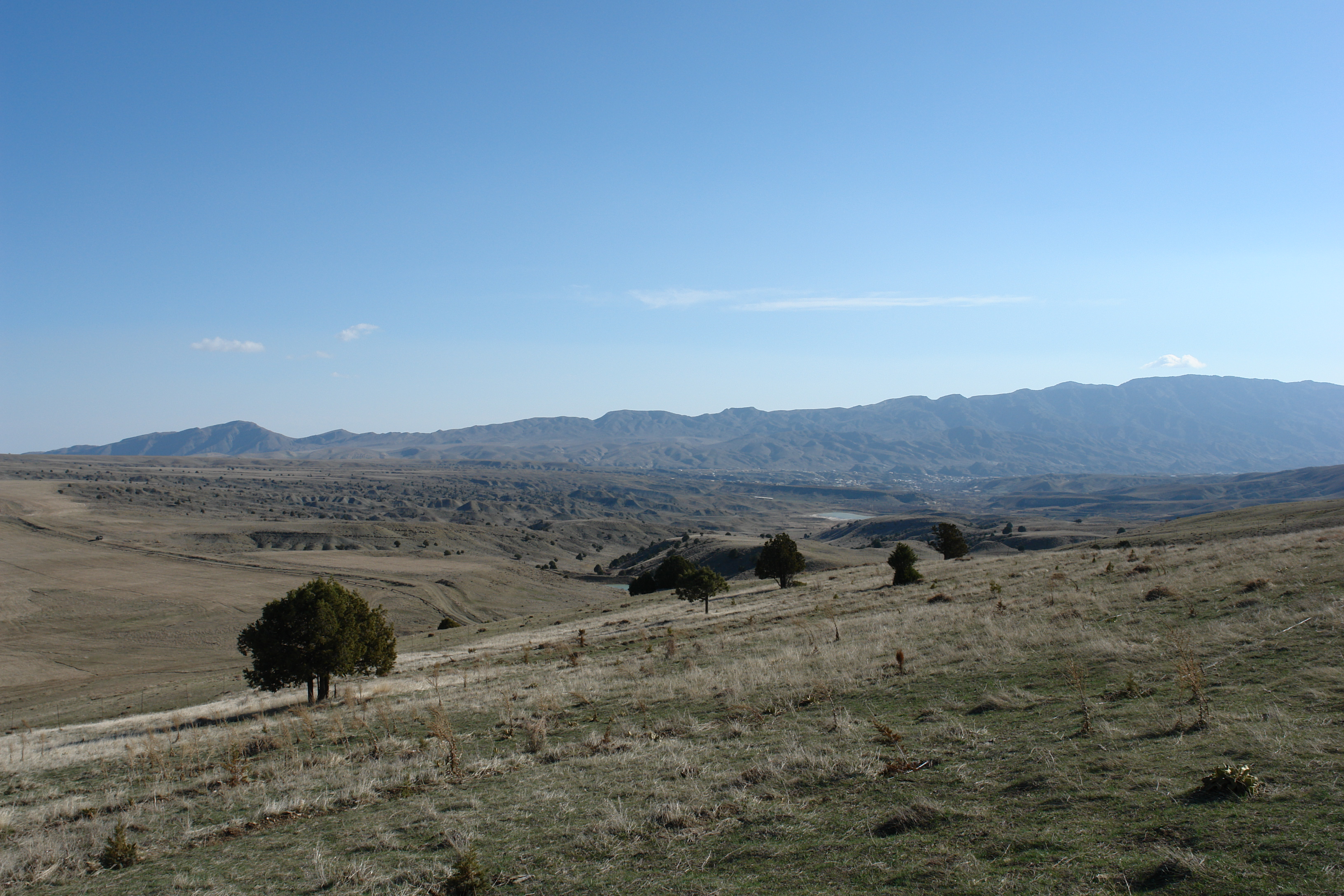
A view from Kone-Gummez village over Hohur-Garawul area, 15 March 2008.

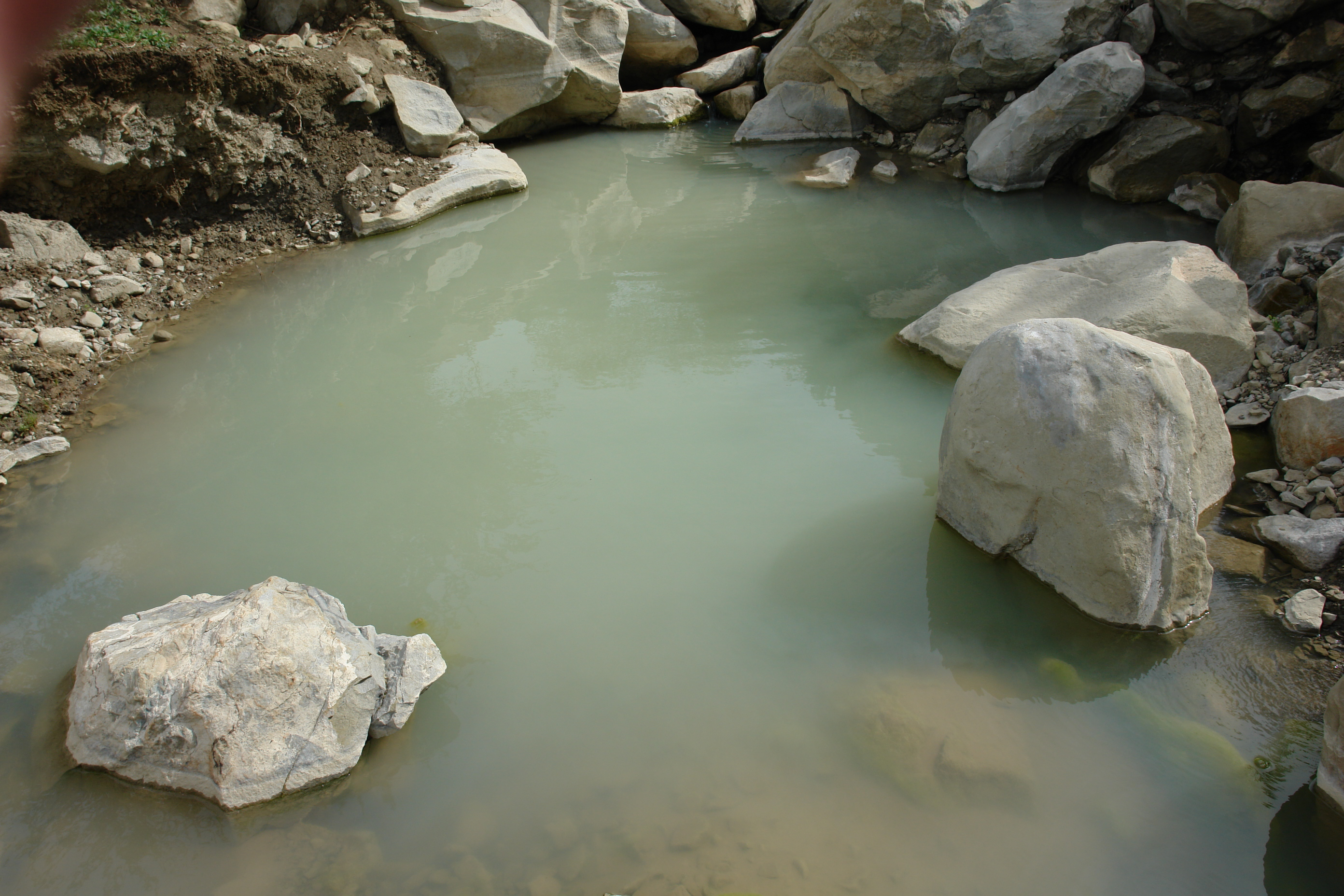
A small pond in Nohur area, Turkmenistan, 10 April 2008.
