= Spiritual Administration of the Muslims of Central Asia and Kazakhstan =

Government religious body in the Soviet Union

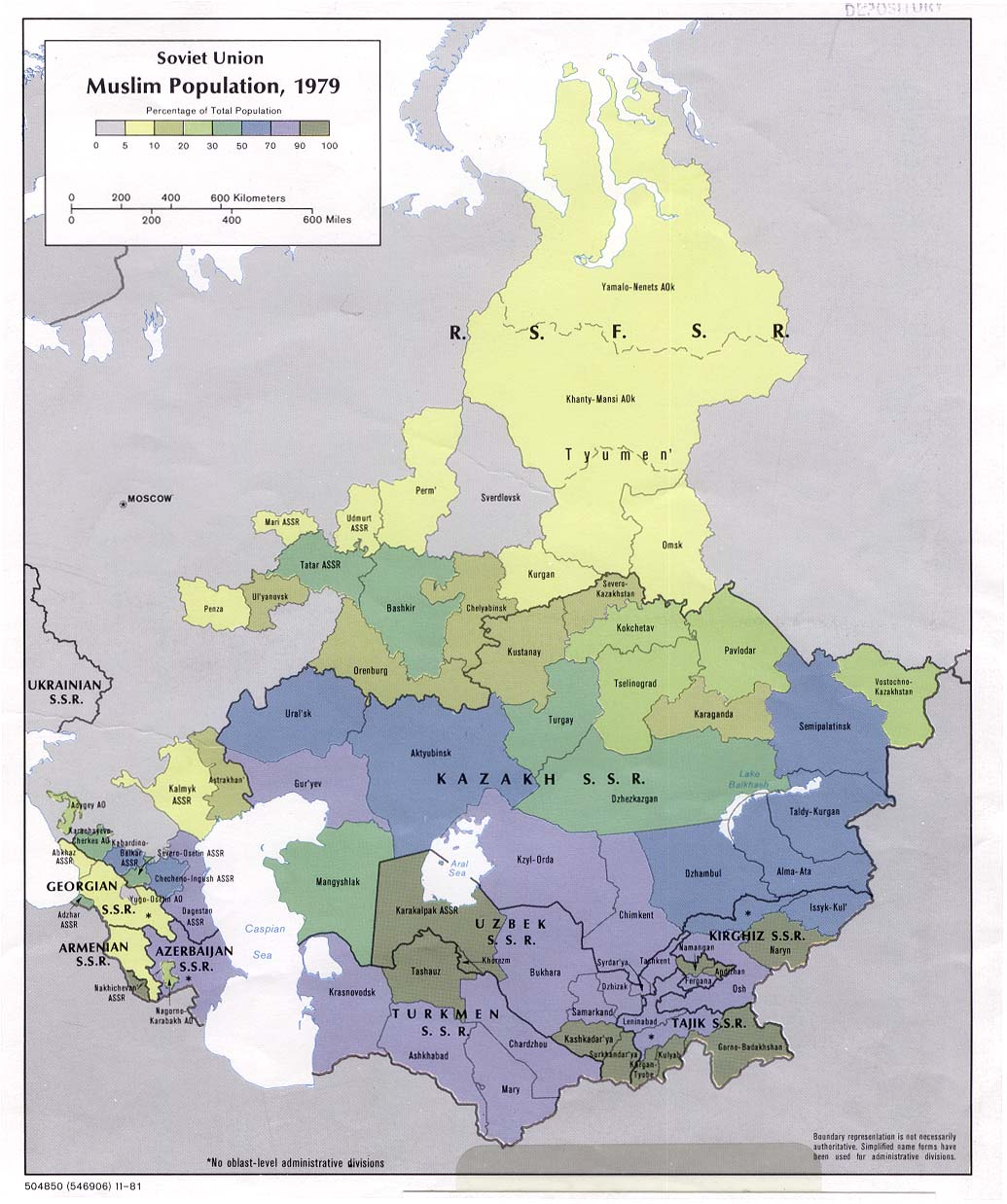
This map shows the 1979 demographic distribution of Muslims within the Soviet Union as a percentage of the population by administrative division.

The Spiritual Administration of the Muslims of Central Asia and Kazakhstan (SADUM) (Russian: Духовное управление мусульман Средней Азии и Казахстана (САДУМ); Uzbek: Ўрта Осиё ва Қозоғистон мусулмонлари диний бошқармаси) was the official governing body for Islamic activities in the five Central Asian republics of the Soviet Union. Under strict state control, SADUM was charged with training clergy and publishing spiritual materials, among other tasks. The organization was headquartered in Tashkent, Uzbekistan. Established in 1943, SADUM existed for nearly 50 years. With the dissolution of the Soviet Union, the five newly independent republics reformed their respective branches of SADUM into their own national Islamic institutions.

== History ==
=== Background ===
The first spiritual assembly in the Russian Empire was established in 1788 in Orenberg. Like SADUM, the Orenburg Muslim Spiritual Assembly was governed by a supreme mufti, and oversaw the appointment of imams and management of mosques throughout the empire.

Russian administrators had been involved in the religious hierarchy of Central Asia since the initial conquest in the 1860s, though the level of government interference varied throughout the region. Some district chiefs were directly responsible for the appointment of instructors at the local madrasahs, as well as naming the overseers of religious endowments (waqfs). Other chiefs retained oversight privileges, but allowed the local community to run affairs autonomously, stepping in only when disputes arose.

The official attitude towards religion changed drastically under the Soviets. Initially the Soviets supported religious activity, specifically that of the Jadids, young Muslim reformers who sought to "modernize" Islam - a goal which fit nicely into Soviet ideals. In 1922 the Soviets even allowed the creation of local religious boards throughout Central Asia. These boards had many of the same functions which SADUM would inherit (though on a more limited scale) in the 1940s. The boards also were charged to be "the link between the government and the people, to conduct the reform of religious affairs and to struggle with very unnecessary superstructures of Islam and the incorrect interpretations of Islam."

By the mid-1920s, however, the situation had changed. Having consolidated their power in the region, the Soviets began to show a changed attitude towards religion. Over the next several years hundreds of mosques were closed or destroyed. The year 1927 saw the initiation of the hujum, an effort to forcibly remove Muslim women's veils. By 1927 all madrasahs were shut down, and 1928 saw the elimination of waqfs. A 1929 law against religious practices effectively ended open religious activity in the country. Many Islamic leaders, including many Jadids, were "liquidated" during Joseph Stalin's Great Purge.

=== Creation of SADUM ===
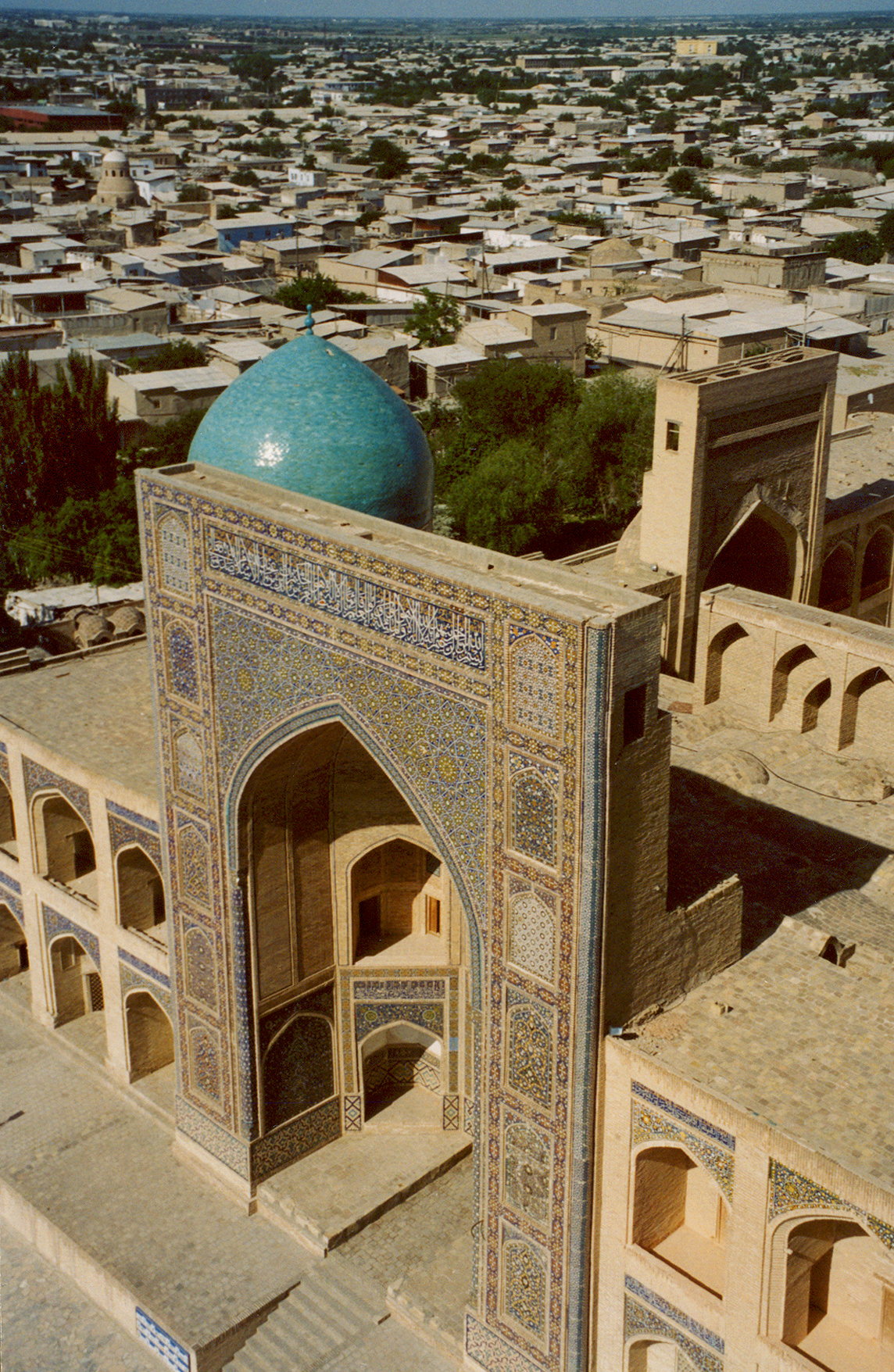
Mir-i-Arab madrasah in Bukhara

The creation of SADUM occurred in the midst of the Second World War (known in the Soviet Union as the Great Patriotic War). The Soviet government, fighting for its survival and requiring the support of all its citizens, relaxed restrictions against religion. As religious persecution subsided and mosques began to re-open, the Central Asian ulema saw an opportunity to push for concessions.

In June 1943, several prominent members of the ulema petitioned Mikhail Kalinin, the Chairman of the Presidium of the Supreme Soviet, to permit a conference of the Central Asian religious elite in Tashkent. At this conference they planned to lay the foundations for a central Islamic organization. The ulema argued that this organization would allow them to better organize the regional war effort. Desiring to shore up Muslim support for the war, the Presidium approved a plan for the creation of the Spiritual Administration of the Muslims of Central Asia and Kazakhstan, to be headquartered in Tashkent. For the first kurultai, a preparation committee was formed which included notable theologists of Uzbekistan, led by Eshon Babakhan ibn Abdulmajidkhan, of Kazakhstan, led by sheikh Abdul Gaffar Shamsutdin, of Tajikistan, led by sheikh Salekh Babakalon, of Kyrgyzstan, led by sheikh Olimkhon Tura Shakir and of Turkmenia, led by sheikh Anna Ishan.

The organization was formally established on October 20, 1943.

Its first chairman was Eshon Babakhan ibn Abdulmajidkhan.

SADUM moved quickly after its founding to re-open local Islamic institutions and re-establish ties with the wider Muslim world. In 1945 a meeting was held with the Saudi king Abdul Aziz ibn Saud, after which Soviet Muslims were allowed to participate in the Hajj. The following year, 1946, saw the reopening of the Mir-i-Arab madrasah in Bukhara.

A second center of Islamic learning, the Imam al-Bukhari Islamic Institute, was founded in Tashkent in 1971.

=== Fracture of SADUM ===
In 1990 Kazakhstan removed its qaziyat from SADUM and established an independent Muftiate for the Muslims of Kazakhstan. This new organization was renamed the Religious Administration of Kazakhstan's Muslims (Kazakh: Қазақстан мұсылмандары діни басқармасы; Russian: Духовное управление мусульман Казахстана). A kurultai (or meeting) of the Muslims of Kazakhstan was held in January 1990, at which time Ratbek hadji Nysanbayev, the top SADUM figure in Kazakhstan, was appointed Kazakhstan's new mufti. The president of Kazakhstan, Nursultan Nazarbayev, also opened an Islamic institute in Almaty to train mullahs.

Upon independence in 1991, Uzbekistan's branch of SADUM was renamed the Muslim Board of Uzbekistan. It was placed within the responsibilities of the Committee on Religious Affairs, which is under the Cabinet of Ministers.

== Structure ==
SADUM oversaw the Islamic activities in the five Soviet republics of Central Asia. The headquarters of SADUM was located in Tashkent, where the chairman of SADUM (known as the mufti) held office. The mufti was elected at a gathering of all the regional Islamic clergy, which was called a kurultai. At the kurultai a presidium was also elected, which was known as the Council of the Ulama.

SADUM was a strict hierarchical organization. Each republic had a SADUM representative office, which was headed by a qazi (except for Uzbekistan, which was headed by the mufti himself). Every qazi was appointed by and subordinate to the mufti in Tashkent, and within each republic all religious personal (such as imams and muezzins) were subordinate to their respective qazis. The four qaziyats were transformed into independent spiritual boards after the break-up of the Soviet Union in 1991.

Major theological questions were considered by the mufti and the Council of the Ulama, whose decisions were then related to the people through local mosques.

The directorate's economic department managed the organization's finances. It also saw to the management and upkeep of all mosques and Islamic architectural monuments of Islam.

SADUM's center in Tashkent also included a library. It was founded by Ishan Babakhan, the first mufti of SADUM, shortly after the organization's creation. He donated over 2,000 of his own books to the library, and by 1980 the library had more than 30,000 works, including 2,000 manuscripts. Notable works in the collection include the first word-by-word translation of the Qur'an from Arabic to Persian, completed in 1267, and an original draft of a collection of hadiths from the 10th century.

== Muftis of SADUM ==
The mufti of SADUM was the leader of the organization. Since SADUM was responsible for more Muslims than any other Muslim directorate in the USSR, their mufti was often referred to as the Supreme Mufti, or Grand Mufti. The Babakhan family held this role for three generations, spanning nearly the entire length of SADUM's existence.

Ziyaudin Babakhan removed Muhammadjan Hindustani from the Council of Ulema after Hindustani denounced him as a "Wahhabist". "Wahhabist" was a derogatory term used in the Ferghana Valley region for scholars whose fatwas deviated from traditional Hanafi interpretations.

In March 1989 an internal coup was organized against the last Babakhan mufti by Muhammad-Sodiq Muhammad Yusuf, a foreign-educated imam from Andijon. After the fall of the Soviet Union and the fracture of SADUM into independent state-run organizations, Muhammad Yusuf became the first mufti of Uzbekistan, but was removed from office in 1993.

=== List of Muftis ===
- Ishan Babakhan (1861–1957, as mufti 1943-1957)
- Ziyauddin Babakhan (1908–1982, as mufti 1957-1982)
- Shamsuddin Babakhan (1937-2003, as mufti 1982-1989)
- Muhammad Sodiq Muhammad Yusuf (1952-2015, as mufti 1989-1993)

== Publications ==
SADUM included a special publishing department which printed and distributed a variety of literature. A journal, Muslims of the Soviet East was consistently published in four languages (Arabic, French, English, and Uzbek) starting in 1969. The Council of the Ulama acted as the journal's editorial board.

SADUM also supported several printings of the Qur'an. The first printing was in 1957, while a second printing based on an Egyptian model, was published in 1960. From 1969 and 1970 another version, based on a local 1913 Qur'an written in the naskh script, was published. A fourth round of Qur'ans were published in 1977.

Publications by SADUM include:

- Historical Monuments of Islam in the USSR (1962)
- al-Adab al-Mufrad (1970)
- as-Sahih al-Bukhari (1974)
- Thulathiyyat al-Bukhari (1974)

== See also ==
- Islam in Central Asia
- Islam in the Soviet Union
- Islam in Kazakhstan
- Islam in Kyrgyzstan
- Islam in Turkmenistan
- Islam in Tajikistan
- Islam in Uzbekistan
- Muftiate
- List of Islamic Muftiates
- Central Spiritual Board of Buddhists of the USSR
