= Ishan Babakhan ibn Abdulmajidkhan =

Islamic religious figure, Grand Mufti of Soviet Central Asia (1858–1957)

- Eshon Boboxon ibn Abdulmajidxon

Chairman of Spiritual Administration of the Muslims of Central Asia and Kazakhstan
- In office 15 October 1943 – 5 June 1957
- Preceded by: Position established
- Succeeded by: Ziyauddinkhan ibn Ishan Babakhan

Personal life
- Born: 1858 Tashkent, Khanate of Kokand
- Died: 5 June 1957 (aged 98–99) Tashkent, Uzbek SSR
- Children: Ziyauddinkhan ibn Ishan Babakhan

Religious life
- Religion: Islam
- Denomination: Sunni
- Lineage: Direct descendant of Ahmad Yasawi
- Jurisprudence: Hanafi

–

Ishan Babakhan ibn Abdulmajidkhan (Uzbek: Eshon Boboxon ibn Abdulmajidxon, 1858–1957) was Islamic religious figure, Grand Mufti of Soviet Central Asia.

Born in Tashkent in a family of ulama who traced their lineage to Ahmad Yasawi, Babakhan studied at the Mu-yi Mubarak madrasa, where his father was mudarris. Among his other teachers was Shami Domla, who in the 1920s presided over regular gatherings of local ulama where hadith was discussed.

Shami Domla posited the supremacy of hadith over all other sources of authority in questions of theology and law. The teachings of Shami Domla were to have a lasting influence of Babakhan’s thought.

Ishan Babakhan was elected mufti of Spiritual Administration of the Muslims of Central Asia and Kazakhstan (SADUM) when the latter was established in 1943. His son Ziyauddin was its secretary and the officially recognized qadi.

He died on June 5, 1957, at the age of 99 and was buried in the mausoleum of Kaffal Shashi in Tashkent by the decision of the government of the Uzbek SSR.
