= Hindostan (1817 ship) =

UK merchant hip (1817–1838)

History

United Kingdom
- Name: Hindostan
- Launched: 1817, Liverpool
- Fate: Wrecked 24 December 1838

General characteristics
- Tons burthen: 364, or 380 (bm)

Hindostan was launched at Liverpool in 1817. initially, she traded with India under a licence from the British East India Company (EIC). She also traded with the United States, Singapore, Africa, and Central America. She was wrecked on 24 December 1838 near Omoa, Honduras.

== Career ==
Hindostan first appeared in Lloyd's Register (LR) in 1818.

Year	Master	Owner	Trade	Source
1818	Steward	J. Cropper & Co.	Liverpool–Calcutta	LR
1819	Steward; C.Kirkwood	J. Cropper & Co.	Liverpool–Calcutta	LR

In 1813 the EIC had lost its monopoly on the trade between India and Britain. British ships were then free to sail to India or the Indian Ocean under a licence from the EIC.

Hindostan, R.Stewart, master, sailed for Bombay on 31 January 1817. She arrived back at Liverpool from Bengal on 13 January 1819. She had sailed from the Cape on 8 December 1818.

On 25 January 1820, Hindostan, Kirkwood, master, sailed for Bombay.

Year	Master	Owner	Trade	Source & notes
1821	C.Kirkwood	J. Cropper & Co.	Liverpool–Calcutta; Liverpool–Savannah	LR
1822	C.Kirkwood	J. Cropper & Co.	Liverpool–Calcutta	LR
1823	C.Kirkwood; M'Callum	J. Cropper & Co.	Liverpool–Calcutta; Liverpool–Philadelphia	LR
1825	M'Cullum	J. Cropper & Co.	Liverpool–Calcutta	LR
1826	M'Cullum	J. Cropper & Co.	Liverpool–Straits [of Gibraltar]	LR
1827	M'Cullum; Renner	J. Cropper & Co.	Liverpool–Straits	LR
1828	Renner	J. Cropper & Co.	Liverpool–Sincapore	LR
1830	Renner	J. Cropper & Co.	Liverpool–Bombay	LR
1831	Renner; J.Pattison	J. Cropper & Co.	Liverpool–Bombay	LR; new wales and pitch pine deck, and large repair 1831
1832	J.Pattison	J. Cropper & Co.	Liverpool	LR; new wales and pitch pine deck, and large repair 1831
1834	J.Pattison	J. Cropper & Co.	Liverpool–New Orleans	LR; large repair 1833
1836	J.Pattison; C.Jackson	J. Cropper & Co. T.Harrison	Liverpool–New Orleans; Liverpool–Africa	LR; large repair 1833

Hindostan, C.Jackson, master, was among the British ships in the Bonny River in April 1837 when Commander Robert Craigie of the sloop HMS Scout overthrew the usurper Annah Pepple, to the Kingdom of Bonny, and reinstated Dappa Pepple. The British signed a new treaty on 9 April 1837.

Year	Master	Owner	Trade	Source & notes
1838	C.Jackson; J.Pearce	T.Harrison	Liverpool–Africa; Liverpool–Demerara	LR; large repair 1833

== Fate ==
Hindostan, Pearce, master, was on her way from Omoa, Honduras to Belize when she wrecked on 24 December 1838 near Omoa. Her materials, cargo, and crew were saved.

Hindostan was no longer listed in the volume of Lloyd's Register for 1839.
