= Hindustan =

Historic term for India

Coordinates: 23°59′40″N 67°25′51″E

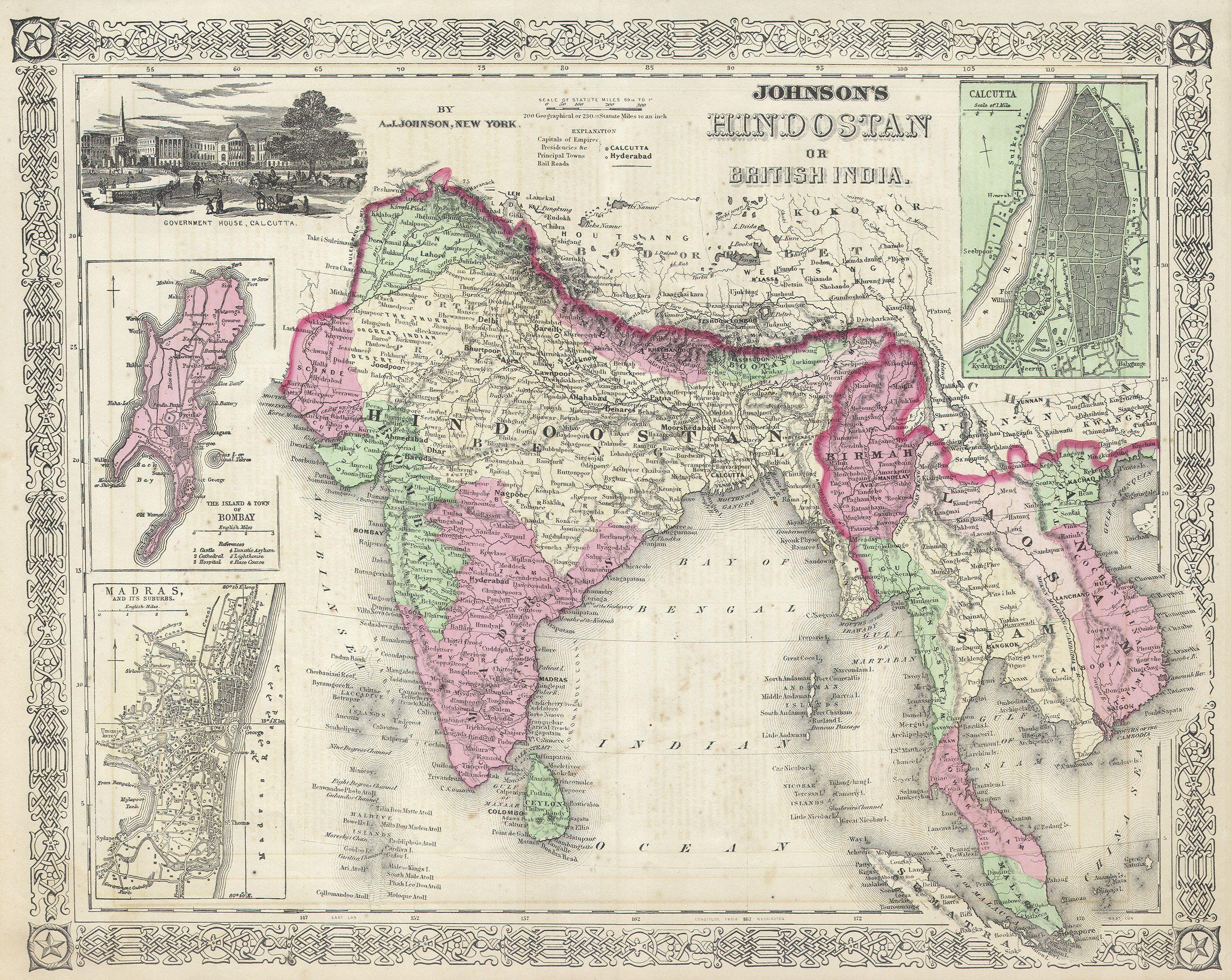
Alvin J. Johnson's map of Hindostan or British India, 1864

Hindustan (/ˈhɪn.du.stæn/ or /ˈhɪn.du.stɑn/, HIN-doo-stan;), along with its shortened form Hind, is the Persian-language name for India, broadly the Indian subcontinent, that later became commonly used by its inhabitants in Hindustani.

Historically the term was used simultaneously for both the northern Indian subcontinent and for the entire subcontinent.

Since the partition of India in 1947, Hindustan continues to be used to the present day as a historic name for the Republic of India.

The Arabic equivalent of the term is al-Hind. Hindustan was also commonly spelt as Hindostan or Hindoostan in English. The word was also used in Prakrit and Sanskrit languages widely.

== Etymology ==
Hindustan is derived from the Persian word Hindū, which is cognate with the Sanskrit word Sindhu (meaning "Indus River"). The Proto-Iranian sound change *s > h occurred between 850 and 600 BCE, according to Asko Parpola. Hence, the Rigvedic sapta sindhava (the land of seven rivers) became hapta hindu in the Avesta. It was said to be the "fifteenth domain" created by Ahura Mazda, apparently a land of 'abnormal heat'. In 515 BCE, Darius I annexed the Indus Valley including Sindhu, the present day Sindh, which was called Hindu in Persian. During the time of Xerxes, the term "Hindu" was also applied to the lands to the east of Indus.

In Middle Persian, probably from the first century CE, the suffix -stān was added, indicative of a country or region, forming the present word Hindūstān. Thus, Sindh was referred to as Hindūstān, in the Naqsh-e-Rustam inscription of Shapur I in c. 262 CE.

Historian B. N. Mukherjee states that from the lower Indus basin, the term Hindūstān got gradually extended to "more or less the whole of the subcontinent". The Greco-Roman name "India" and the Chinese name Shen-tu also followed a similar evolution.

The Arabic term Hind, derived from Persian Hindu, was previously used by the Arabs to refer to the much wider region from the Makran coast to the Indonesian archipelago. But eventually it too became identified with the Indian subcontinent.

== Current usage ==
=== Republic of India ===
"Hindustan" is often used to refer to the modern-day Republic of India. Slogans involving the term are commonly heard at sports events and other public programmes involving teams or entities representing the modern nation-state of India. In marketing, it is also commonly used as an indicator of national origin in advertising campaigns and is present in many company names. Muhammad Ali Jinnah, the founder of Pakistan, and his party the Muslim League, insisted on calling the modern-day Republic of India "Hindustan" in reference to its Hindu-majority population.

=== Language ===
The Hindustani language is the language of Hindustan and the lingua franca of the northern Indian subcontinent. Hindustani derives from the Old Hindi language of Western Uttar Pradesh and Delhi areas. Its literary standard forms—Modern Standard Hindi and Modern Standard Urdu—use different scripts. The Hindi register itself derives its name from shortened form, Hind (India).

== Historical usages ==
Babur Nama

The country of Hindustan is extensive, full of men and full of produce. On the east, south and even on the west it ends at its great enclosing ocean (muḥiṭ-daryā-sī-gha). On the north it has mountains that connect with those of Hindu-Kush, Kafiristan and Kashmir. North-west of it lies Kabul, Ghazni and Qandahar. Dihlī is held (aīrīmīsh) to be the capital of the whole of Hindustan...

— Babur Nama, A. S. Beveridge, trans., vol. 1, sec. iii: 'Hindustan'

Early Persian scholars had limited knowledge of the extent of India. After the advent of Islam and the Muslim conquests, the meaning of Hindustan interacted with its Arabic variant Hind, which was derived from Persian as well, and almost became synonymous with it. The Arabs, engaging in oceanic trade, included all the lands from Tis in western Balochistan (near modern Chabahar) to the Indonesian archipelago, in their idea of Hind, especially when used in its expansive form as "Al-Hind". Hindustan did not acquire this elaborate meaning. According to André Wink, it also did not acquire the distinction, which faded away, between Sind (roughly what is now western Pakistan) and Hind (the lands to the east of the Indus River); other sources state that Sind and Hind were used synonymously from early times, and that after the arrival of Islamic rule in India, "the variants Hind and Sind were used, as synonyms, for the entire subcontinent."

The 10th century text Hudud al-Alam defined Hindustan as roughly the Indian subcontinent, with its western limit formed by the river Indus, southern limit going up to the Great Sea and the eastern limit at Kamarupa, the present day Assam. For the next ten centuries, both Hind and Hindustan were used within the subcontinent with exactly this meaning, along with their adjectives Hindawi, Hindustani and Hindi. Indeed, in 1220 CE, historian Hasan Nizami described Hind as being "from Peshawar to the shores of the [Indian] Ocean, and in the other direction from Siwistan to the hills of Chin."

With the Turko-Persian conquests starting in the 11th century, an accurate meaning of Hindustan took shape, defining the land of the river Indus. The conquerors were liable to call the lands under their control Hindustan, ignoring the rest of the subcontinent. In the early 11th century a satellite state of the Ghaznavids in the Punjab with its capital at Lahore was called "Hindustan". After the Delhi Sultanate was established, north India, especially the Gangetic plains and the Punjab, came to be called "Hindustan". Scholar Bratindra Nath Mukherjee states that this narrow meaning of Hindustan existed side by side with the wider meaning, and some of the authors used both of them simultaneously.

In the time of the Delhi Sultanate (1206–1526) and the Mughal Empire (1526–1857), the ruling elite and its Persian historiographers made a further distinction between "Hindustan" and "Hind". Hindustan referred to the territories of northern India in the Doab and adjacent regions under Muslim political control, while "Hind" referred to the rest of India.

In the Delhi Sultanate, Hindustan referred to the territories of today's northern India, the Punjab and the lands of the Indus. The Mughals called their lands 'Hindustan'. The term 'Mughal' itself was never used to refer to the land. As the empire expanded, so too did 'Hindustan'. At the same time, the meaning of 'Hindustan' as the entire Indian subcontinent is also found in Baburnama and Ain-i-Akbari. The Mughals made a further distinction between "Hindustani" and "Hindu". In Mughal sources, Hindustani commonly referred to Muslims in Hindustan, while non-Muslim Indians were referred to as Hindus. This meaning was also employed in the Delhi Sultanate, for e.g. the army of Ghiyas ud din Balban was referred to as "Hindustani" troops, who were attacked by the "Hindus".

=== Kingdom of Nepal ===
The last Gorkhali King Prithvi Narayan Shah self proclaimed the newly unified Kingdom of Nepal as Asal Hindustan (real Hindustan) due to North India being ruled by the Islamic Mughal rulers. The self proclamation was done to enforce Hindu social code (Dharmashastra) over his reign and refer to his country as being inhabitable for Hindus. He also referred Northern India as Mughlan (Country of Mughals) and called the region infiltrated by Muslim foreigners.

=== Colonial India ===
The dual meanings of the terms "India," "Hindustan," and the "Mughal Empire" persisted with the arrival of Europeans. For instance, Rennel produced an atlas titled the Memoir of a Map of Hindoostan or the Mogul Empire in 1792, which actually depicted the Indian subcontinent. This conflation of terms by Rennel illustrates the complexity and overlap of these concepts during that period. J. Bernoulli, to whom Hindustan meant the Mughal Empire, called his French translation La Carte générale de l'Inde (General Map of India). This 'Hindustan' of British reckoning was divided into British-ruled territories (more often referred to as 'British India') and the territories ruled by native rulers. The British officials and writers, however, thought that the Indians used 'Hindustan' to refer to only North India. An Anglo-Indian Dictionary published in 1886 states that, while Hindustan means India, in the native parlance it had come to represent the region north of Narmada River excluding Bihar and Bengal.

During the independence movement, the Indians referred to their land by all three names: 'India', 'Hindustan' and 'Bharat'. Mohammad Iqbal's poem Tarānah-e-Hindī ("Anthem of the People of Hind") was a popular patriotic song among Indian independence activists:

Sāre jahāṉ se acchā Hindustān hamārā
(Better than the entire world, is our Hindustan)

=== Partition of India ===
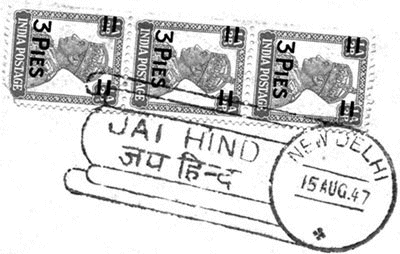
Jai Hind postmark, which was issued on 15 August 1947

The 1940 Lahore Resolution of the All-India Muslim League demanded sovereignty for the Muslim-majority areas in the northwest and northeast of British India, which came to be called 'Pakistan' in popular parlance and the Dominion of India came to be called 'Hindustan'. The British officials too picked up the two terms and started using them officially.

However, this naming did not meet the approval of Indian leaders due to the implied meaning of 'Hindustan' as the land of Hindus. They insisted that the new Dominion of India should be called 'India', not 'Hindustan'. Probably for the same reason, the name 'Hindustan' did not receive official sanction of the Constituent Assembly of India, whereas 'Bharat' was adopted as an official name. It was recognised however that 'Hindustan' would continue to be used unofficially.

The Indian Armed Forces use the salutary version of the name, "Jai Hind", as a battle cry.

== See also ==
- Asal Hindustan - Historical name Nepal (Gorkha) Kingdom
- Hindoestani, Dutch word for people of Indian origin in Suriname
- Al-Hindiya, city in Karbala, Iraq, named after an Indian noble
- Mainland India
- Names for India
  - Āryāvarta
  - Bharat
  - Jambudvīpa
- Ganga-Jamuni tehzeeb, fusion of Hindu-Muslim cultures in northern India
- -stan, Persian suffix meaning "land of"

== General sources ==
- Clémentin-Ojha, Catherine (2014). "'India, that is Bharat…': One Country, Two Names". South Asia Multidisciplinary Academic Journal. 10.
- Dhulipala, Venkat (2015), Creating a New Medina, Cambridge University Press, ISBN 978-1-107-05212-3
- Habib, Irfan (2011). "Hindi/Hindwi in Medieval Times: Aspects of Evolution and Recognition of a Language". In Ishrat Alam; Syed Ejaz Hussain (eds.). The Varied Facets of History: Essays in Honour of Aniruddha Ray. Primus Books. pp. 105–124. ISBN 978-93-80607-16-0 – via Google Books.
- Lipner, Julius (1998). Hindus: Their Religious Beliefs and Practices. Routledge. ISBN 0415051827.
- Parpola, Asko (2015). The Roots of Hinduism: The Early Aryans and the Indus Civilization. Oxford University Press. ISBN 978-0190226923.
- Mukherjee, Bratindra Nath (1989). The Foreign Names of the Indian Subcontinent. Place Names Society of India – via Google Books.
- Ray, Niharranjan; Chattopadhyaya, Brajadulal, eds. (2000), A Sourcebook of Indian Civilization, Orient Blackswan, ISBN 978-81-250-1871-1
- Sharma, Arvind (2002). "On Hindu, Hindustan, Hinduism and Hindutva". Numen. 49 (1): 1–36. doi:10.1163/15685270252772759. JSTOR 3270470.
- Wink, André (2002) [first published 1990]. Al-Hind: The Making of the Indo-Islamic World (Third ed.). Brill. ISBN 0391041738 – via Google Books.
