= List of Islamic muftiates =

This is a growing List of Islamic muftis and territorial muftiates. The mufti is the official head of the muftiate. The Grand Mufti is the official head of a board of regional muftis.

== Countries ==
=== Albanian muftiates ===
The Muslim Community of Albania
Grand Muftiate	Grand Mufti	Term of office	Headquarters
Grand Muftiate of Albania
Grand Muftiate of Albania	Grand Mufti Bujar Spahiu	2018–present	Tirana
Grand Mufti Albania	Grand Mufti Selim Muca	2004–2014	Tirana
Grand Muftiate of Albania	Grand Mufti Hafiz Sabri Koçi	1991–2004	Tirana
Albanian muftiates	Albanian Muftis	Term of office	Headquarters
Muftiate of Elbasan	Mufti Agim Duka		Elbasan
Muftiate of Krujë	Mufti Ledian Cikalleshi		Krujë
Muftiate of Shkodër	Mufti Muhamed Sytari		Shkodër
Muftiate of Dibra	Mufti Muis Kurtulla		Peshkopi
Muftiate of Devoll	Mufti Artur Vrenozi		Bilisht
Muftiate of Kavajë	Mufti Besnik Lecini		Kavajë
Muftiate of Mat	Mufti Valdrin Mera		Burrel
Muftiate of Mallakastër	Mufti Anis Qafa		Kuçovë
Muftiate of Delvinë	Mufti Bledar Ali		Delvinë
Muftiate of Sarandë	Mufti Bledar Mullaj		Sarandë
Muftiate of Skrapar	Mufti Jusuf Salkurti		Corovoda
Muftiate of Malësi e Madhe	Mufti Edmir Smajlaj		Koplik
Muftiate of Tropojë	Mufti Eduard Demiraj		Bajram Curri
Muftiate of Gjirokastër	Mufti Armand Asllani		Gjirokastër
Muftiate of Puka	Mufti Gëzim Kopani		Puka
Muftiate of Permet	Mufti Jemin Muça		Permet
Muftiate of Tirana	Mufti Ylli Gurra		Tirana
Muftiate of Lezhë	Mufti Agim Tereziu		Lezhë
Muftiate of Gramsh	Mufti Hasan Cekrezi		Gramsh
Muftiate of Vlorë	Mufti Hito Shahaj		Vlorë
Muftiate of Kukës	Mufti Islam Hoxha		Kukës
Muftiate of Peqin	Mufti Bilal Bodlli		Peqin
Muftiate of Fier	Mufti Karafil Manaj		Fier
Muftiate of Kuçovë	Mufti Kujtim Civeja		Kuçovë
Muftiate of Kolonjë	Mufti Edmond Ceni		Ersekë
Muftiate of Kurbin	Mufti Emiroj Vathaj		Laç
Muftiate of Berat	Mufti Murat Duro		Berat
Muftiate of Pogradec	Mufti Namik Mahmutllari		Pogradec
Muftiate of Korçë	Mufti Qazim Muçi		Korçë
Muftiate of Durrës	Mufti Redin Quku		Durrës
Muftiate of Has	Mufti Sadik Ukperaj		Has
Muftiate of Bulqizë	Mufti Sejdin Strazimiri		Bulqizë
Muftiate of Lushnjë	Mufti Gramos Blliku		Lushnjë
Muftiate of Librazhd	Mufti Taulant Bica		Librazhd

=== Algerian muftiates ===
The Muslim Community of Algeria
Algerian muftiates	Algerian Muftis	Term of office	Headquarters
Muftiate of Algiers	Mohamed Tahar Aït Aldjet	2010–present	Algiers

=== Office of the Grand Mufti of Australia ===
Office	Grand Mufti	Term of office	Headquarters
Office of the Grand Mufti	Grand Mufti Ibrahim Abu Mohamed Grand Mufti Abdel Aziem Al-Afifi Grand Mufti Ibrahim Abu Mohamed Grand Mufti Fehmi Naji Grand Mufti Taj El-Din Hilaly	2018–present 2018 2011–2018 2007–2011 1992–2007	Lakemba

=== Belarusian muftiates ===
The Muslim Religious Community of the Republic of Belarus
Muftiate	Mufti	Term of office	Headquarters
Muftiate of Belarus	Mufti Abu-Bekir Shabanovič	2005 – present	Minsk
Muftiate of Belarus	Mufti Ismail Mustafavič Aleksandrovič	1994–2005	Minsk

The Muslim Spiritual Board of the Republic of Belarus
Muftiate	Mufti	Term of office	Headquarters
The Muslim Spiritual Board of the Republic of Belarus	Mufti Ali Varanovič	2011 – present	Minsk
The Muslim Spiritual Board of the Republic of Belarus	Mufti Ismail Varanovič	2002 –2011	Minsk

=== Bosnian muftiates ===
The muftiates of Croatia, Sandžak, and Slovenia are under authority of the Grand Muftiate of Bosnia and Herzegovina

The Islamic Community of Bosnia and Herzegovina
Grand Muftiate	Grand Mufti	Term of office	Headquarters
Grand Muftiate of Bosnia and Herzegovina	Grand Mufti Husein Kavazović	2012 – present	Sarajevo
Grand Muftiate of Bosnia and Herzegovina	Grand Mufti Mustafa Cerić	1993–2012	Sarajevo
Grand Muftiate of Bosnia and Herzegovina	Grand Mufti Jakub Selimoski	1990–1993	Sarajevo
Grand Muftiate of Bosnia and Herzegovina	Grand Mufti Husein Mujić	1987–1989	Sarajevo
Grand Muftiate of Bosnia and Herzegovina	Grand Mufti Naim Hadžiabdić	1975–1987	Sarajevo
Grand Muftiate of Bosnia and Herzegovina	Grand Mufti Sulejman Kemura	1957–1975	Sarajevo
Grand Muftiate of Bosnia and Herzegovina	Grand Mufti Ibrahim Fejić	1947–1957	Sarajevo
Grand Muftiate of Bosnia and Herzegovina	Grand Mufti Salih Safvet Bašić	1942–1947	Sarajevo
Grand Muftiate of Bosnia and Herzegovina	Grand Mufti Fehim Spaho	1938–1942	Sarajevo
Grand Muftiate of Bosnia and Herzegovina	Grand Mufti Ibrahim Maglajlić	1930–1936	Sarajevo
Grand Muftiate of Bosnia and Herzegovina	Grand Mufti Mehmed Džemaludin Čaušević	1913–1930	Sarajevo
Grand Muftiate of Bosnia and Herzegovina	Grand Mufti Sulejman Šarac	1910–1913	Sarajevo
Grand Muftiate of Bosnia and Herzegovina	Grand Mufti Mehmed Teufik Azabagić	1893–1909	Sarajevo
Grand Muftiate of Bosnia and Herzegovina	Grand Mufti Mustafa Hilmi Hadžiomerović	1882–1893	Sarajevo
Bosnian muftiates	Bosnian Muftis	Term of office	Headquarters
Muftiate of Banja Luka	Mufti Ibrahim Halilović	2004 – present	Banja Luka
Muftiate of Banja Luka	Mufti Edhem Čamdžić	1988–1998	Banja Luka
Muftiate of Bihać	Mufti Mehmed Sabit Ribić		Bihać
Muftiate of Bihać	Mufti Hasan Makić		Bihać
Muftiate of Goražde	Mufti Hamed Efendić		Goražde
Muftiate of Mostar	Mufti Seid Smajkić		Mostar
Muftiate of Sarajevo	Mufti Husein Smajić		Sarajevo
Muftiate of Travnik	Mufti Nusret Abdibegović		Travnik
Muftiate of Tuzla	Mufti Husein Kavazović	1993–2012	Tuzla
Muftiate of Tuzla	Mufti Mehmet Tevfik		Tuzla
Muftiate of Zenica	Mufti Ejub Dautović		Zenica
Military Muftiate of Bosnia and Herzegovina	Military Mufti Ismail Smajlović		Sarajevo

==== Mešihat of Croatia ====
The Mešihat of Croatia is under the authority of the Grand Muftiate of Bosnia and Herzegovina

The Islamic Community of Croatia
Mešihat of Croatia	Grand Mufti	Term of office	Headquarters
Mesihat of Croatia and Muftiate of Zagreb	Mufti of Zagreb and Grand Mufti of Croatia Aziz Hasanović	2012–present	Zagreb

==== Mešihat of Sandžak ====
The Mešihat of Sandžak is under the authority of the Grand Muftiate of Bosnia and Herzegovina

Islamic Community in Serbia
Mesihat of Sandžak	Grand Mufti of Sandžak	Term of office	Headquarters
Mešihat of Sandžak	Chief Mufti Muamer Zukorlić	–	Novi Pazar
Sandžak muftiates	Sandžak Muftis	Term of office	Headquarters
Muftiate of Belgrade	Mufti Rešad Plojović		Belgrade
Muftiate of Novi Sad	Mufti Fadil Murati Mufti Rešad Plojović		Novi Sad
Muftiate of Preševo Valley	Mufti Mumin Tahiri		Preševo
Muftiate of Sandžak	Mufti Muamer Zukorlić		Sandžak

==== Mešihat of Slovenia ====
The Mešihat of Slovenia is under the authority of the Grand Muftiate of Bosnia and Herzegovina

The Islamic Community in Slovenia (ISRS)
Mešihat of Slovenia	Grand Mufti	Term of office	Headquarters
Mešihat of Slovenia	Nedžad Grabus	2006–present	Ljubljana

=== Bulgarian muftiates ===
The Muslim Denomination of Bulgaria
Grand Muftiate	Grand Mufti	Term of office	Headquarters
Chief Muftiate of Bulgaria	Chief Mufti Mustafa Alish Hadji	2008–present	Sofia
Bulgarian muftiates	Bulgarian Muftis	Term of office	Headquarters
Muftiate of Aytos	Mufti Ibrahim Kiorpe		Aytos
Muftiate of Dobrich	Mufti Bilial Mehmed		Dobrich
Muftiate of Gotse Delchev (town)	Mufti Dzemal Hamid		Gotse Delchev (town)
Muftiate of Haskovo			Haskovo
Muftiate of Kardzhali	Mufti Nasuf Nasuf		Kardzhali
Muftiate of Krumovgrad			Krumovgrad
Muftiate of Montana, Bulgaria			Montana, Bulgaria
Muftiate of Pazardzhik			Pazardzhik
Muftiate of Pleven	Mufti Basri Pechlivan		Pleven
Muftiate of Plovdiv	Mufti Ali Hadzhi Sadik		Plovdiv
Muftiate of Razgrad	Mufti Mehmed Allia		Razgrad
Muftiate of Ruse, Bulgaria			Ruse, Bulgaria
Muftiate of Shumen	Mufti Osman Ismail		Shumen
Muftiate of Silistra			Silistra
Muftiate of Sliven			Sliven
Muftiate of Smolyan	Mufti Shifket Hadzhi		Smolyan
Muftiate of Sofia	Mufti Ali Hairaddin		Sofia
Muftiate of Stara Zagora			Stara Zagora
Muftiate of Targovishte			Targovishte
Muftiate of Varna			Varna
Muftiate of Veliko Tarnovo			Veliko Tarnovo

=== Muftiates in the Caucasus states ===
The South Caucasus states (Azerbaijan, Armenia, Georgia) are under authority of the Grand Muftiate of the Caucasus (Baku). The Russian North Caucasus muftiates are united into the Coordinating Center of North Caucasus Muslims.

The Spiritual Administration of the Muslims of the Chechen Republic in the period 1991–2000 functioned as the muftiate of the unrecognized Chechen Republic of Ichkeria, since 2000 as part of the Russian Federation.

The Religious Council of the Caucasus
Grand Muftiate	Grand Mufti	Term of office	Headquarters
The Grand Muftiate of the Caucasus	Grand Mufti of the Caucasus Allahshukur Pashazadeh	1992–present	Baku
Muftiates	Muftis	Term of office	Headquarters
Muftiate of Azerbaijan			
Muftiate of Georgia			

The Coordinating Center of North Caucasus Muslims (Russian Federation)
Coordinating Muftiate	Mufti	Term of office	Headquarters
The Coordinating Center of North Caucasus Muslims	Mufti Ismail Berdiyev	2003–present	Moscow and Buynaksk
Muftiates	Muftis	Term of office	Headquarters
The Muftiate of the Republic of Dagestan	Mufti Sheikh Ahmad Afandi Abdulaev	1998–present	Makhachkala
The Spiritual Administration of the Muslims of the Republic of Adygea and Krasnodar Krai	Mufti Askarbiy Kardanov	2012–present	Maykop
The Spiritual Administration of the Muslims of the Chechen Republic	Mufti Salah Mezhiev	2014–present	Grozny
The Spiritual Administration of the Muslims of the Kabardino-Balkarian Republic	Mufti Hazrataliy Dzasejev	2010–present	Nalchik
The Spiritual Administration of the Muslims of the Republic of Kalmykia			Elista
The Spiritual Administration of the Muslims of the Karachay-Cherkess Republic	Mufti Ismail Berdiyev	1991–present	Cherkessk
The Spiritual Administration of the Muslims of the Republic of North Ossetia–Alania	Mufti Khajimurat Gatsalov	2011–present	Vladikavkaz
The Spiritual Administration of the Muslims of Stavropol Krai			Stavropol
The Spiritual Centre of the Muslims of the Republic of Ingushetia	Mufti Isa Khamkhoev	present	Magas

The Spiritual Administration of the Muslims of the Chechen Republic
Muftiate	Mufti	Term of office	Headquarters
The Muftiate of the Chechen Republic (not state recognized in the 1990s) / of the Chechen Republic (since 2000 as part of Russia)	Mufti Muhammad-Bashir Arsanukayev Mufti Mahmud Garkayev Mufti Muhammed-Khusein Alsabekov Mufti Akhmad Kadyrov Mufti Akhmad Shamaiev Mufti Sultan Mirsayev Mufti Salah Mezhiev	1991–1993 1993–1994 1994 1994–2000 2000–2005 2005–2014 2014–present	Grozny

The Religious Board of Muslims of Adjara
Muftiate	Mufti	Term of office	Headquarters
The Muftiate of Adjara	Mufti Mahmud Kamashidze		Batumi

The Spiritual Board of Muslims of Abkhazia
Muftiate	Mufti	Term of office	Headquarters
The Muftiate of Abkhazia	Mufti Salikh Kvaratskhelia Mufti Adlia Gablia Mufti Timur Dzyba	2011–present 1995–2011	Sukhumi

The Administration of Muslims of Georgia (AMG)
Muftiate	Mufti	Term of office	Headquarters
The Administration of Muslims of Georgia (country)	Shi'a Sheikh Vagip Akapilov; Sunni Mufti Jemal Parkhadze		Tbilisi

=== Greek muftiates ===
Muftiate	Mufti	Term of office	Headquarters
Muftiate of Didymoteicho	Mufti Hamza Osman		Didymoteicho

Muftiate
Muftiate of Komotini
Mufti

Mufti Ibrahim Şerif (supported from Turkey)

Mufti Cihat Halil

(state-appointed mufti)

Term of office

Headquarters

Komotini

Muftiate	Mufti	Term of office	Headquarters
Muftiate of Xanthi	Mufti Mustafa Trampa (supported from Turkey) Mufti Nezden Hemseri (state-appointed mufti)		Xanthi

=== Office of the Grand Mufti of India ===
Office	Grand Mufti	Term of office	Headquarters
Office of the Grand Mufti	Sheikh Abubakr Ahmad	2019–Present	New Delhi, India

(Barelvism)

=== Office of the Grand Mufti of Jerusalem ===
Office	Grand Mufti	Term of office	Headquarters
Office of the Grand Mufti	Muhammad Ahmad Hussein Ekrima Sa'id Sabri Sulaiman Ja'abari Saad al-Alami Hussam ad-Din Jarallah Mohammad Amin al-Husseini Kamil al-Husayni	2006–present 1994–2006 1993–1994 1953–1993 1948–1954 1921–1948 1920–1921	Jerusalem

=== Kazakh muftiates ===
The Spiritual Administration of the Muslims of Kazakhstan
Supreme Muftiate	Supreme Mufti	Term of office	Headquarters
Supreme Muftiate of Kazakhstan	Supreme Mufti Yerzhan Malgajyuly Mayamerov Supreme Mufti Absattar Derbisali Supreme Mufti Ratbek Nysanbayev	2013–present – 1990 – 2000	Almaty

=== Kosovar muftiates ===
The Islamic Community of Kosovo
Grand Muftiate	Mufti	Term of office	Headquarters
Grand Muftiate of Kosovo	Grand Mufti de:Naim Tërnava Grand Mufti Rexhep Boja	2008–present 1990–2003	Pristina

=== Kyrgyz muftiates ===
Spiritual Board of Muslims of Kyrgyzstan
Grand Muftiate	Grand Mufti	Term of office	Headquarters
Grand Muftiate of Kyrgyzstan	Grand Mufti Maksatbek Toktomushev Grand Mufti Rahmatilla Egemberdiev Grand Mufti Chubak Zhalilov	2014–present 2012–2014 2010–2012	Bishkek

=== Lithuanian muftiates ===
Council of Lithuanian Muslims Religious Communities – Muftiate
Muftiate	Mufti	Term of office	Headquarters
Muftiate of Lithuania – LMRBT	Mufti Aleksandras Beganskas	2019–present	Vilnius

Spiritual Center of the Lithuanian Sunni Muslims
Muftiate	Mufti	Term of office	Headquarters
Muftiate of Lithuania - LMSDC	Mufti Romualdas Jakibauskas Mufti Romualdas Krinickis	2008–present 1998 – 2008	Vilnius

=== Macedonian muftiates ===
Islamic Community of Macedonia (ICM)
Grand Muftiate	Mufti	Term of office	Headquarters
Grand Muftiate of Macedonia	Grand Mufti Hadzhi Sulejman Rexhepi (present) Grand Mufti Taxhedin Bislimi (2006-) Grand Mufti Zenun Berisha	– – –	Skopje
Macedonian muftiates	Macedonian Muftis	Term of office	Headquarters
Muftiate of Bitola	Pellumb Veliu		Bitola
Muftiate of Debar	Ramazan Hasa		Debar
Muftiate of Gostivar	Shaqir Fetahu		Gostivar
Muftiate of Kičevo	Murat Hyseni		Kičevo
Muftiate of Kumanovo	Abedin Imeri		Kumanovo
Muftiate of Ohrid	Samet Ajdari		Ohrid
Muftiate of Prilep	Mustafa Topalovski		Prilep
Muftiate of Resen			Resen
Muftiate of Skopje	Ibrahim Shabani		Skopje
Muftiate of Štip	Isa Ismaili		Štip
Muftiate of Struga	Salim Sylejmani		Struga
Muftiate of Tetovo	Qani Nesimi		Tetovo

=== Malaysia ===
Malaysia has a unique system of collective mufti. Nine of the fourteen Malaysian states have their own sultan; each of these nine states have their own mufti who usually controls the Islamic Council or Islamic Department of the state. At the national level, the Fatwa Committee of the National Council for Islamic Religious Affairs together with the five officials appointed by the National Council, collectively issue fatāwā at the national level.

The Fatwa Committee of the National Council for Islamic Religious Affairs
Offices of muftis	Muftis	Term of office	Headquarters
Mufti of the Federal Territories	Ahmad Fauwaz Fadzil	2020–present	
Mufti of Johor	Dato Hj Yahya bin Ahmad	2018–present	
Mufti of Kedah	Syeikh Fadzil Awang	2017–present	
Mufti of Kelantan	Mohamad Shukri Mohamad		
Mufti of Malacca	Abdul Halim Tawil		
Mufti of Negeri Sembilan	Mohd Yusof Ahmad	2009–present	
Mufti of Pahang	Abdul Rahman Osman		
Mufti of Penang	Wan Salim Wan Mohd Noor		
Mufti of Perak	Harussani Zakaria	1985–present	
Mufti of Perlis	Mohd Asri Zainul Abidin	2015–present	
Mufti of Sabah	Bungsu Aziz Jaafar	2012–present	
Mufti of Sarawak	Kipli Yassin		
Mufti of Selangor	Mohd Tamyes Abd Wahid	1998–present	
Mufti of Terengganu	Zulkifly Muda	2013–present	

=== Montenegrin muftiates ===
Islamic Community of Montenegro
Grand Muftiate	Mufti	Term of office	Headquarters
Grand Muftiate of Montenegro	Grand Mufti Reif Fejzić		Podgorica

=== Polish muftiates ===
Muslim Religious Union in the Republic of Poland
Muftiate	Mufti	Term of office	Headquarters
Muftiate of Poland	Mufti Tomasz Miśkiewicz	2004–present	Białystok

=== Romanian muftiates ===
Muslim Community in Romania
Muftiate	Mufti	Term of office	Headquarters
Muftiate of Romania	Mufti Murat Yusuf Mufti Bagâş Sanghirai	2005–present 2000 – 2005	Constanţa

=== Russian muftiates ===
National boards
Grand Muftiates	Grand Muftis	Term of office	Headquarters
The Central Spiritual Administration of the Muslims of Russia	Grand Mufti Sheikh-ul-Islam Talgat Tadzhuddin	1992–present	Ufa
The Spiritual Administration of the Muslims of Russian Federation	Grand Mufti Sheikh Rawil Ğaynetdin	2014–present	Moscow
Muftiate	Mufti	Term of office	Headquarters
The Spiritual Assembly of the Muslims of Russia	Mufti Albir Krganov	2016–present	Moscow

Subnational boards
Muftiates	Muftis	Term of office	Headquarters
The Coordinating Center of North Caucasus Muslims	Mufti Ismail Berdiyev	2003–present	Moscow and Buynaksk
The Spiritual Administration of the Muslims of the Asian Part of Russia	Supreme Mufti Nafigulla Ashirov	1997–present	Moscow and Tobolsk

Regional muftiates
Muftiates	Muftis	Term of office	Headquarters
The Muftiate of the Republic of Dagestan (MRD)	Mufti Sheikh Ahmad Afandi Abdulaev Mufti Said-Magomed Abubakarov	1998–present 1997–1998	Makhachkala
The Spiritual Administration of the Muslims of the Republic of Adygea and Krasnodar Krai	Mufti Askarbiy Kardanov Mufti Nurbiy Emizh	2012–present 2002–2012	Maykop
The Spiritual Administration of the Muslims of Altai Krai			Barnaul
The Spiritual Administration of the Muslims of Altai Republic	Mufti Zhanbolat Okhtaubaiev		Gorno-Altaysk
The Spiritual Administration of the Muslims of the Republic of Bashkortostan	Mufti Ainur Birgalin	2019–present	Ufa
The Spiritual Administration of the Muslims of the Chechen Republic	Mufti Salah Mezhiev	2014–present	Grozny
The Spiritual Administration of the Muslims of the Republic of Ingushetia	Mufti Sheikh Muhammed Alboghatchiev	present	Magas
The Spiritual Administration of the Muslims of the Kabardino-Balkarian Republic	Mufti Hazrataliy Dzasejev Mufti Anas Pshikhachev Mufti Shafiq Pshikhachev	2010–present 2002–2010 1992–2002	Nalchik
The Spiritual Administration of the Muslims of the Republic of Kalmykia			Elista
The Spiritual Administration of the Muslims of the Karachay-Cherkess Republic	Mufti Ismail Berdiyev	1991–present	Cherkessk
The Spiritual Administration of Muslims of the Khanty-Mansiysky District			Khanty-Mansiysk
The Kumyk Spiritual Board (KSB)	Mufti B. Issaev		Makhachkala
The Spiritual Board of Muslims of the Republic of Mordovia			Saransk
The Spiritual Administration of Muslims of Moscow and Central Russia	Mufti Albert Krganov Rifkatovich		Moscow
The Spiritual Board of Muslims of the Nizhny Novgorod Region	Mufti Gayaz Zakirov Mufti Umar Idrisov	2008–present 1993–2008	Nizhny Novgorod
The Spiritual Administration of the Muslims of the Republic of North Ossetia–Alania	Mufti Khajimurat Gatsalov	2011–present	Vladikavkaz
The Spiritual Administration of Muslims of the Orenburg Region			Orenburg
The Spiritual Board of Muslims of the Perm Region			Perm
The Spiritual Board of Muslims of the Rostov Region			Rostov-on-Don
The Spiritual Administration of Muslims of Primorsky			Vladivostok
The Spiritual Board of Muslims of the Samara Region	Mufti Hazrat Yarullin Vagiz		Samara
The Spiritual Board of Muslims of Siberia (the Muftiate of Omsk, SBMS)	Mufti Zulqarnay Shakirzyanov		Omsk
The Spiritual Administration of the Muslims of Stavropol Krai			Stavropol
The Spiritual Administration of the Muslims of the Republic of Tatarstan (SAMRT)	Mufti Kamil Samigullin Mufti Ildus Yunusov Mufti Gusman Iskhakov Mufti Gabdulla Galiulla	2013–present 2011–2013 1998–2011 1992–1998	Kazan
The Central Spiritual Board of Muslims of the Ulyanovsk Region	Mufti Hazrat Muhammad Baybikov	2010–present	Ulyanovsk

=== Office of the Grand Mufti of Saudi Arabia ===
Office	Grand Mufti	Term of office	Headquarters
Office of the Grand Mufti	Grand Mufti Saleh ibn Fawzan al-Fawzan Grand Mufti Abdul-Aziz ibn Abdullah Al ash-Sheikh Grand Mufti Abdul Aziz bin Abdullah bin Baz position abolished Grand Mufti Muhammad ibn Ibrahim Al ash-Sheikh	2025–present 1999–2025 1993–1999 1969–1993 1953–1969	Riyadh

=== Serbian muftiates ===
Islamic Community of Serbia
Grand Muftiate	Grand Mufti	Term of office	Headquarters
Grand Muftiate	Grand Mufti Sead ef. Nasufović		Belgrade
Serbian muftiates	Serbian Muftis	Term of office	Headquarters
Meshihat of Serbia	Abdullah Numan		Belgrade
Meshihat of Sandžak	Hasib Suljović		Novi Pazar
Meshihat of Preševo	Nedžmedin Saćipi		Preševo

Mufti of Belgrade and Serbian military forces

Mustafa Jusufspahic

For the Serbian Mesihat of Sandžak see the Muftiate of Bosnia and Herzegovina

=== Slovenian muftiates ===
The Slovenian Muslim Community (SMS)
Muftiate	Mufti	Term of office	Headquarters
Muftiate of Slovenia	Mufti Nedžad Grabus Mufti Osman Đogić	2006–present 2001–2005	Ljubljana

For the Mesihat of Slovenia see Muftiate of Bosnia and Herzegovina.

=== Soviet-era muftiates ===
The Spiritual Administration of the Muslims of Central Asia and Kazakhstan (SADUM)
Supreme Muftiate	Supreme Muftis	Term of office	Headquarters
Supreme Muftiate of Central Asia and Kazakhstan	Supreme Mufti Muhammad Sadik Muhammad Yusuf Supreme Mufti Shamsuddin Babakhan Supreme Mufti Ziyauddin Babakhan Supreme Mufti Ishan Babakhan	1989 – 1993 1982 – 1989 1957 – 1982 1943 – 1957	Tashkent

Spiritual Administration of the Muslims of the European Part of USSR and Siberia (DUMES)
Grand Muftiate	Grand Mufti	Term of office	Headquarters
Grand Muftiate of European Part of USSR and Siberia	Grand Mufti Talgat Tadzhuddin	1980–1992	Ufa

The Spiritual Directorate of Transcaucasia (DUMZ)
Muftiate	Mufti	Term of office	Headquarters
Muftiate of Transcaucasia	Mufti Allahshukur Pashazadeh Mufti Mirzagazanfar Ibragimov Mufti :az:Aliaga Suleymanzade Mufti Agha Movsum Hakim-zadeh: Shi'a Mufti Agha Akhund Alizadeh; Deputy Sunni Mufti Ibrahim Efendi-zadeh	1980 – 1992 1978 – 1980 1968 – 1972 1952 – 1956 1943 – 1952	Baku

The Spiritual Directorate of Muslims of the Northern Caucasus (DUMSK)
Muftiate	Mufti	Term of office	Headquarters
Muftiate of the Northern Caucasus	Mufti Hizri Gebekov		Buynaksk

=== Ukrainian muftiates ===
Muftiate	Mufti	Term of office	Headquarters
The Spiritual Direction of the Muslims of Crimea (SDMC)	Mufti Kirim Esende		Kyiv

Muftiate	Mufti	Term of office	Headquarters
The Spiritual Directorate of the Muslims of Crimea (SDCM)	Mufti Emirali Ablaev Mufti Nuri Mustafayev Mufti Seitdzhelil Ibragimov	1999–present 1996 – 1999 1992 – 1995	Simferopol

Muftiate	Mufti	Term of office	Headquarters
The Spiritual Directorate of Muslims of Ukraine (SDMU)	Mufti Sheik Tamim Ahmed Muhamed Mutah		Kyiv

Muftiate	Mufti	Term of office	Headquarters
The Spiritual Center of Muslims of Ukraine (SCMU)	Mufti Ruslan Abdikyeyev	2005–present	Donetsk

Muftiate	Mufti	Term of office	Headquarters
The Religious Directorate of Independent Muslim Communities of Ukraine "Kyiv Muftiate"	Ildar Hazrat Hussein		

Muftiate	Mufti	Term of office	Headquarters
The Religious Administration of Muslims of Ukraine "Ummah" (SDMU "Ummah")	Mufti Said Ismagilov		

=== Uzbek muftiates ===
The Muslim Board of Uzbekistan
Grand Muftiate	Grand Mufti	Term of office	Headquarters
Grand Muftiate of Uzbekistan	Grand Mufti Nuriddin Kholiqnazarov Grand Mufti Usman Alimov Grand Mufti Abdurashid Kori Bakhromov Grand Mufti Muxtorjon ABDULLOH Grand Mufti Muhammad Sadik Muhammad Yusuf	2021–present 2006–2021 1995–2006 1993–1995 1989–1993	Tashkent

== See also ==
- Muftiate
- Grand Mufti
- Mufti
