= Ahmad Afandi Abdulaev =

Mufti of Dagestan, Russia (b. 1959)

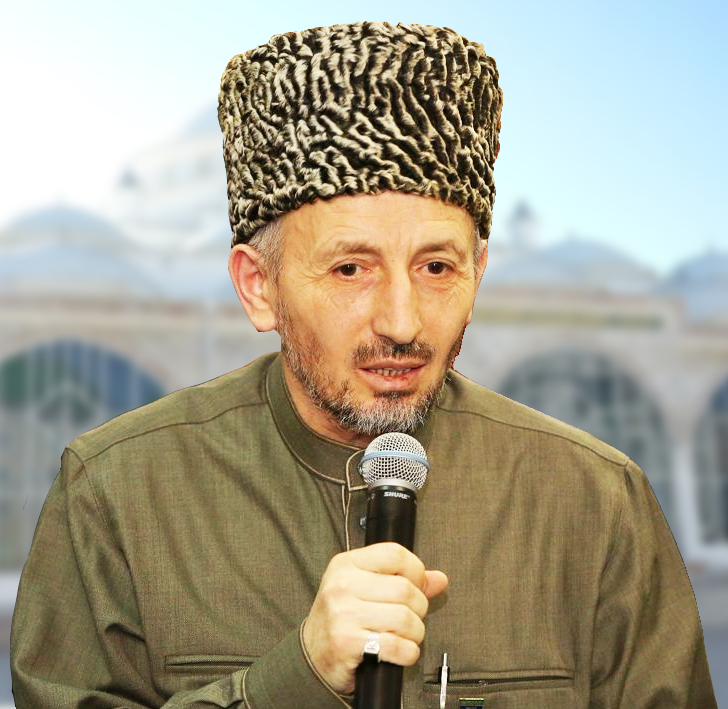
- Abdulaev in 2015
- Born: Ахмад Магомедович Абдулаев; 15 September 1959 (age 67); Verkhnee Inkho, Dagestan ASSR, Russian SFSR, Soviet Union
- Citizenship: Russia
- Occupation: Mufti
- Known for: Shaykh of Naqshbandi and Shadhili tariqah

Ahmad Afandi Abdulaev (Avar: АхӀмад ХӀажи ГӀабдулаев, Russian: Ахмад Магомедович Абдулаев, Akhmad Magomedovich Abdulayev; born 15 September 1959) is the mufti of Dagestan, Russia. He serves as Chairman of the Muftiate of the Republic of Dagestan, Sheikh of Naqshbandi and Shadhili tariqas, one of the spiritual leaders of Dagestani Muslims.

== Early life ==
Ahmad Afandi Abdulaev was born on September 15, 1959, in the Dagestan Autonomous Soviet Socialist Republic, in the village of Inkho, Gumbetovsky District. From his earliest years, Ahmad studied Arabic and Islam. His family practiced devotion to faith, even during Soviet times, when believers were persecuted. His relatives took care of their faith and raised their children according to Islamic precepts. Ahmad is the grandson of Sufi sheikh of Naqshbandi and Shazali Tariqas Abdulhamid-Afandi.

== Career ==
In 1991, Ahmad became the imam of a mosque in Kizilyurt district. In 1992 he began teaching at the Islamic Institute in Kizilyurt, where he served as Rector. In 1998, at the Council of the Alims of Dagestan, Abdulaev was elected as mufti and chairman of the Spiritual Administration of Dagestani Muslims.

== Awards ==
- Order of Merit "For services to the Republic of Dagestan"(2009)
- Anniversary Medal "50th Anniversary of ROSSNAA" (Russian Society of Solidarity and Cooperation of the Peoples of Asia and Africa) (2011)
- Gold Star of the People's Hero of Dagestan (2015)
- Commemorative Medal in honor of opening of the Moscow Cathedral Mosque complex (2015)
- Medal of Honor of Dagestan Republic "For the love of his native land" (2016)
- Golden "Order of the Peacemaker" (2018)
- Memorable badge of RosAviation "95 years of Civil Aviation of Russia" (2018)
- Anniversary Commemorative Medal "90th Anniversary of Civil Aviation of the Republic of Dagestan" (2018)
- Memorable badge of the Russian Parliament "25 years of The Federation Council" (2019)
- Order of Friendship (2019)
- Order of Merit for the Ummah, I degree (2019)
- Order of Glory and Honor (2019)
- Medal "For Valiant Labor" - for services to the Republic of Dagestan (2021)
- Medal "For loyalty to the Fatherland" (2021)

== Bibliography ==
In 2015, his book The Virtues of the Righteous was published in Arabic, its translations in Avar, Russian, Tajik, Kazakh, Kyrgyz and Uzbek languages were published subsequently. By the end of 2015, total circulation exceeded 200,000 copies. Based on the book a series of video lessons, as well as audio book followed its release.

== See also ==
- Salah Mezhiev (Mufti of Chechnya)
- Kamil Samigullin (Mufti of Tatarstan)
