= Islam in Tatarstan =

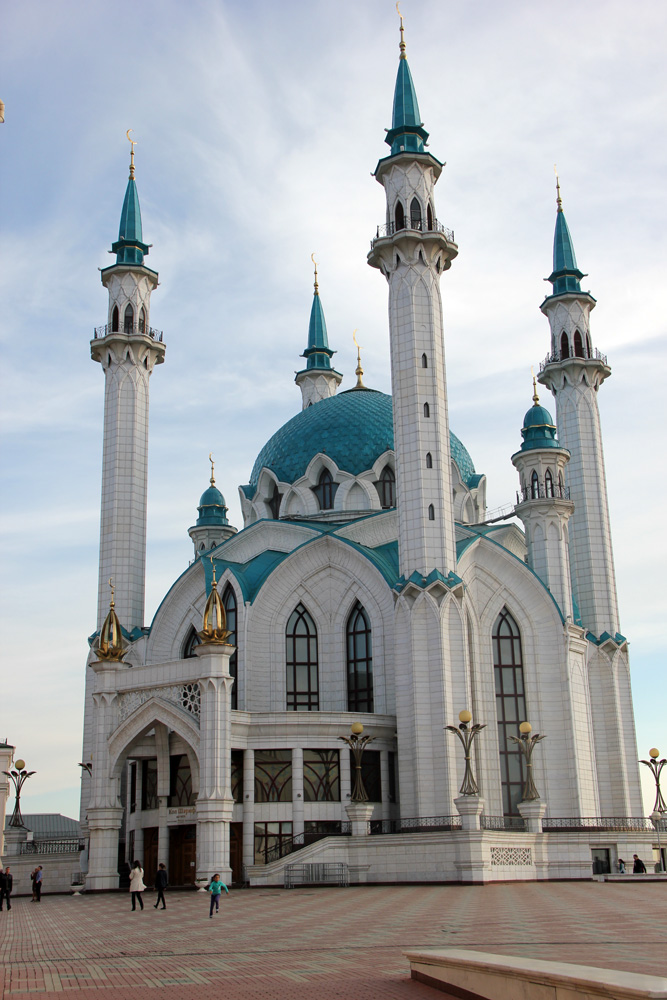
Qolşärif Mosque in Kazan

Islam in Tatarstan existed prior to the tenth century, but it saw major growth in 922, when Bulgar ruler Almış converted to Islam. This was followed by an increase in missionary activity in Volga Bulgaria. Islam remained the dominant religion through the Mongol invasion and subsequent Khanate of Kazan. In 1552, the region was finally conquered by Russia, bringing the Volga Tatars and Bashkirs on the Middle Volga into the tsardom. Under Russian rule, Islam was suppressed for many years, first during the Tsardom and Russian Empire, while also facing persecution during the Soviet era. Today, Islam is a major faith in Tatarstan, adhered to by 47.8–55 percent of the estimated 3.8 million population, making it one of the two dominant religions in the region, the other being Orthodox Christianity.

Marat Gatin is the minister for Interaction with Religious Organizations, a Presidential department.

== History ==
The earliest known organized state within the boundaries of Tatarstan was Volga Bulgaria (c. 700–1238 CE). The Volga Bulgars had an advanced mercantile state with trade contacts throughout Inner Eurasia, the Middle East and the Baltic, which maintained its independence despite pressure by nations such as the Khazars, the Kievan Rus' and the Kipchaks. In 921, Bulgar ruler Almış sent an ambassador to the Caliph requesting religious instruction. Islam was introduced by missionaries from Baghdad around the time of Ibn Fadlan's journey in 922. Almış' conversion to Islam made Volga Bulgaria the first Muslim state in what is now Russia.

The Khanate of Kazan was conquered by the troops of Tsar Ivan IV the Terrible in the 1550s, with Kazan being taken in 1552. Many of the inhabitants of Kazan were forcibly converted to Christianity while others were drowned or forced to leave Kazan. Cathedrals were built in Kazan; by 1593, mosques in the area were destroyed, and the Russian government forbade their construction. This prohibition remained in place until Catherine the Great lifted it in the 18th century. The first mosque to be rebuilt under Catherine's auspices began construction in 1766 and was completed four years later.

=== Soviet rule ===
On 27 May 1920, the Tatar Autonomous Soviet Socialist Republic was created. Under Joseph Stalin, the Soviet Union began to place restrictions on the use of the Bulgar turki language, which used a variant of Arabic script. The Bulgar turki alphabet switched to Cyrillic. The development of national culture declined significantly and religion, including Islam, in Tatarstan was severely repressed. Volga Bulgarians were forcibly renamed to Tatars (an insulting exonym for Volga Bulgarians) by Soviet decree.

The 1921–1922 famine in Tatarstan was a period of mass starvation and drought that took place in the Tatar ASSR, in which 500,000 to 2,000,000 peasants died. The event was part of the greater Russian famine of 1921–22 that affected other parts of the USSR, in which up 5,000,000 people died in total. In 2008, the All-Russian Tatar Social Center (VTOTs) asked the United Nations to condemn the 1921-22 Tatarstan famine as a genocide of Muslim Tatars.

According to Ruslan Kurbanov, an expert on Islam in modern Russia, Volga Bulgarians have demonstrated a very constructive and effective way of developing their religious and national identity and widening their political autonomy within Russia. In the most difficult years of post-Soviet Russia — years of deep economic crisis and two Chechen wars — Tatars demonstrated phenomenal results in the economic development of their national republic.

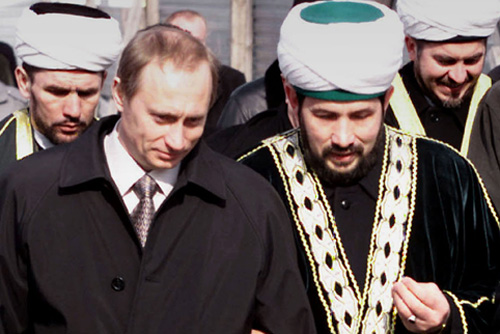
Russian President Vladimir Putin with Mufti of Tatarstan in Kazan

== Recent developments ==
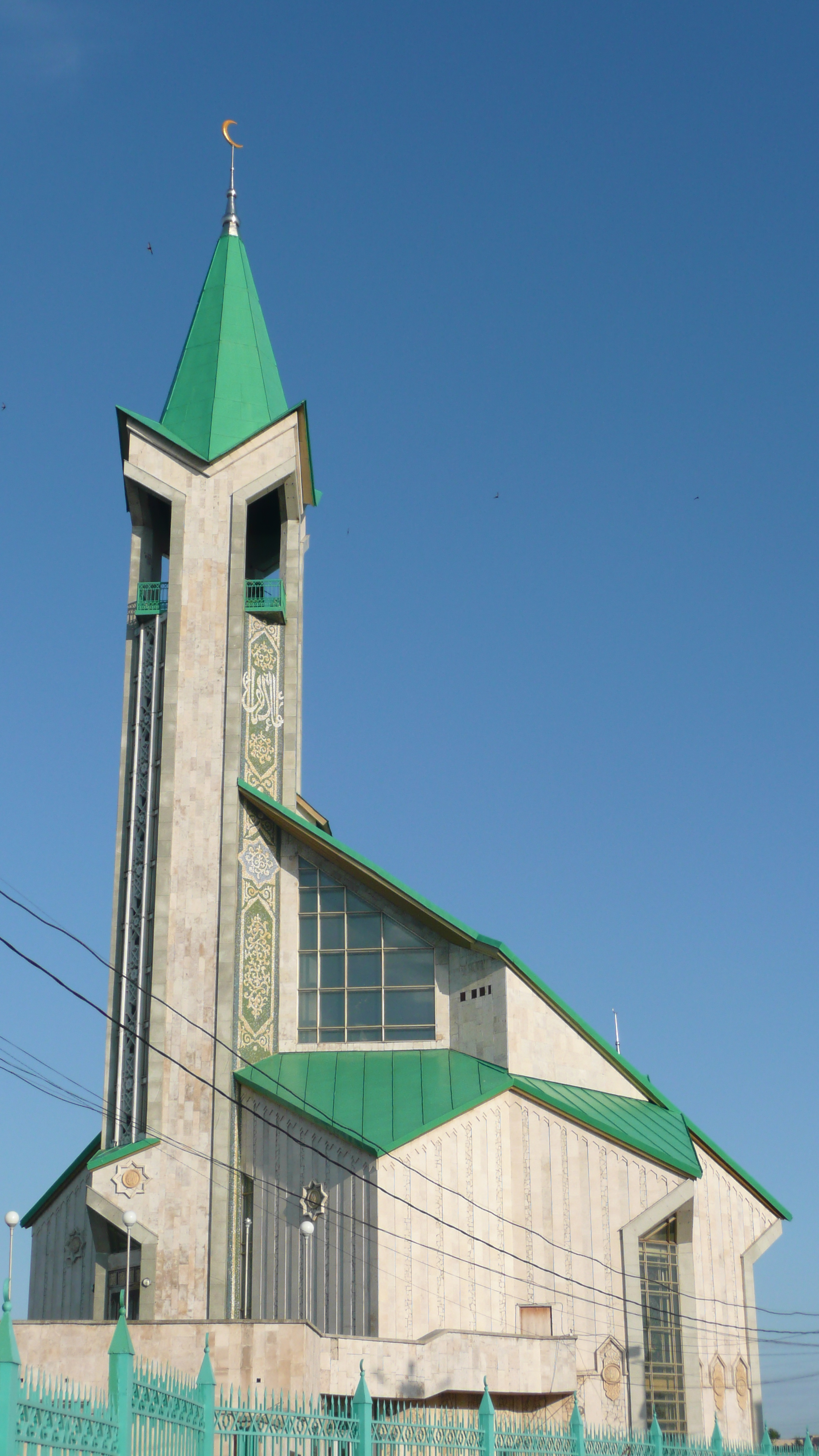
Mosque in Naberezhnye Chelny.

The independent Spiritual Administration of Muslims of the Republic of Tatarstan was established in 1992.

In September 2010, Eid al-Fitr and 21 May, the day the Volga Bulgars embraced Islam, were made public holidays. Despite the holiday, the Kazan Federal University decided to hold classes on Eid al-Adha. This caused students to protest, with some declaring their intention to skip class and attend mosque services. Tatarstan also hosted an international Muslim film festival which screened over 70 films from 28 countries including Jordan, Afghanistan and Egypt. The first halal food production facility opened with foreign companies expressing their interest to expand the project in Tatarstan. The recently opened facility produces 30 halal products and employs 200 people.

In 2010 and 2011 Islamic banking was introduced.

Kazan held the 8th international Quran Reader's Contest from 23 to 25 November, organized by the Russian Islamic University, which is based in Kazan. Ways of facilitating modern religious education in Tatarstan were also discussed.

== Demographics ==
Islam is the majority faith in Tatarstan. In 1990, there were only 100 mosques but that number, rose to well over 1000 by 2004. As of 1 January 2008, as many as 1398 religious organizations were registered in Tatarstan, of which 1055 are Muslim. Many of the Muslims in Tatarstan are practicing. Increased religiousness has been evident among Muslims and interfaith relations remain very strong.

== See also ==
- Islam in Europe
- Islam in Russia
- 1921–22 famine in Tatarstan

== Sources ==
- Dronin, N. M.; Bellinger, E. G. (2005). Climate Dependence and Food Problems in Russia, 1900-1990: The Interaction of Climate and Agricultural Policy and Their Effect on Food Problems. Central European University Press. ISBN 9789637326103.
- Millar, James R. (2004). Encyclopedia of Russian History Volume 2: A-D. New York, USA: Macmillan Reference. ISBN 0-02-865907-4.
- Mizelle, Peter Christopher (May 2002). "Battle with Famine:" Soviet Relief and the Tatar Republic 1921-1922. District of Columbia, USA: University of Virginia.
