= Valiulla Yakupov =

- Валиулла́ Яку́пов; Вәлиулла Якупов
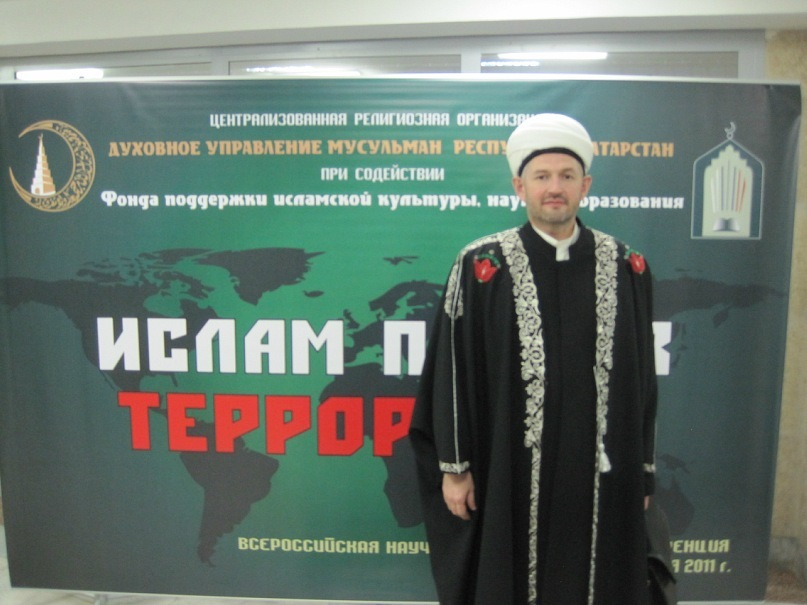
- Born: 4 September 1963; Dmitrievka, Russian SFSR, USSR
- Died: 19 July 2012 (aged 48); Kazan, Russia
- Cause of death: Assassination by gunshot
- Occupation: Muslim cleric

Valiulla Makhmutovich Yakupov (Russian: Валиулла́ Махму́тович Яку́пов; Tatar: Вәлиулла Мәхмүт улы Якупов, romanized: Wäliulla Mäxmüt ulı Yakupow; 4 September 1963 – 19 July 2012) was a prominent Muslim cleric in Tatarstan, Russia, and the deputy to the Muslim province's chief mufti. He was also known as a strong critic of radical Islamist organisations which advocate Salafism, a radical form of Islam. According to news agency Interfax, Yakupov founded Russia's first Islamic literary publishing house. Yakupov was killed by suspected radical Islamists in 2012.

== Death ==
=== Assassination ===
Yakupov was shot dead while walking on the Zarya Street estate in Kazan, Tatarstan, where he lived, according to a statement released by Russia's Investigative Committee. However, there is another report that he was killed while sitting on his porch. Shortly thereafter, the chief mufti, Ildus Faizov, was wounded in the legs after an explosive device blasted through his vehicle. A day after Yakupov's assassination, Russian police detained five people suspected to be involved in Yakupov's killing.

=== Response ===
Russia's Council of Muftis has branded the murder of Yakupov as a terror attack. "Unfortunately, deadly attacks on religious leaders have become common," Vladimir Legoyda, the chief of the Synodal Information Department, said. Reports from the media suggest that Yakupov was an anti-extremist activist and the attack may have taken place due to his strong opposition to radicalism.

== See also ==
- Salafism
