= Spiritual Administration of Muslims of the Republic of Tatarstan =

- Татарстан Җөмһүрияте мөселманнарының Диния нәзарәте Духовное управление мусульман Республики Татарстан
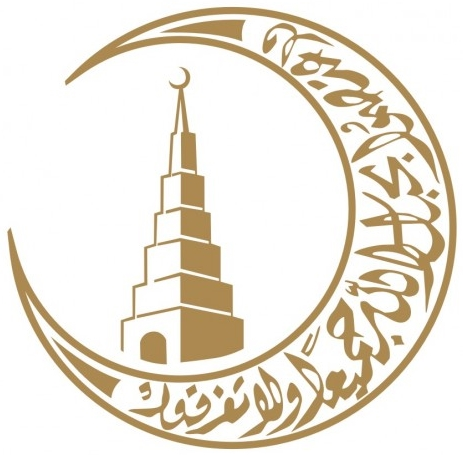

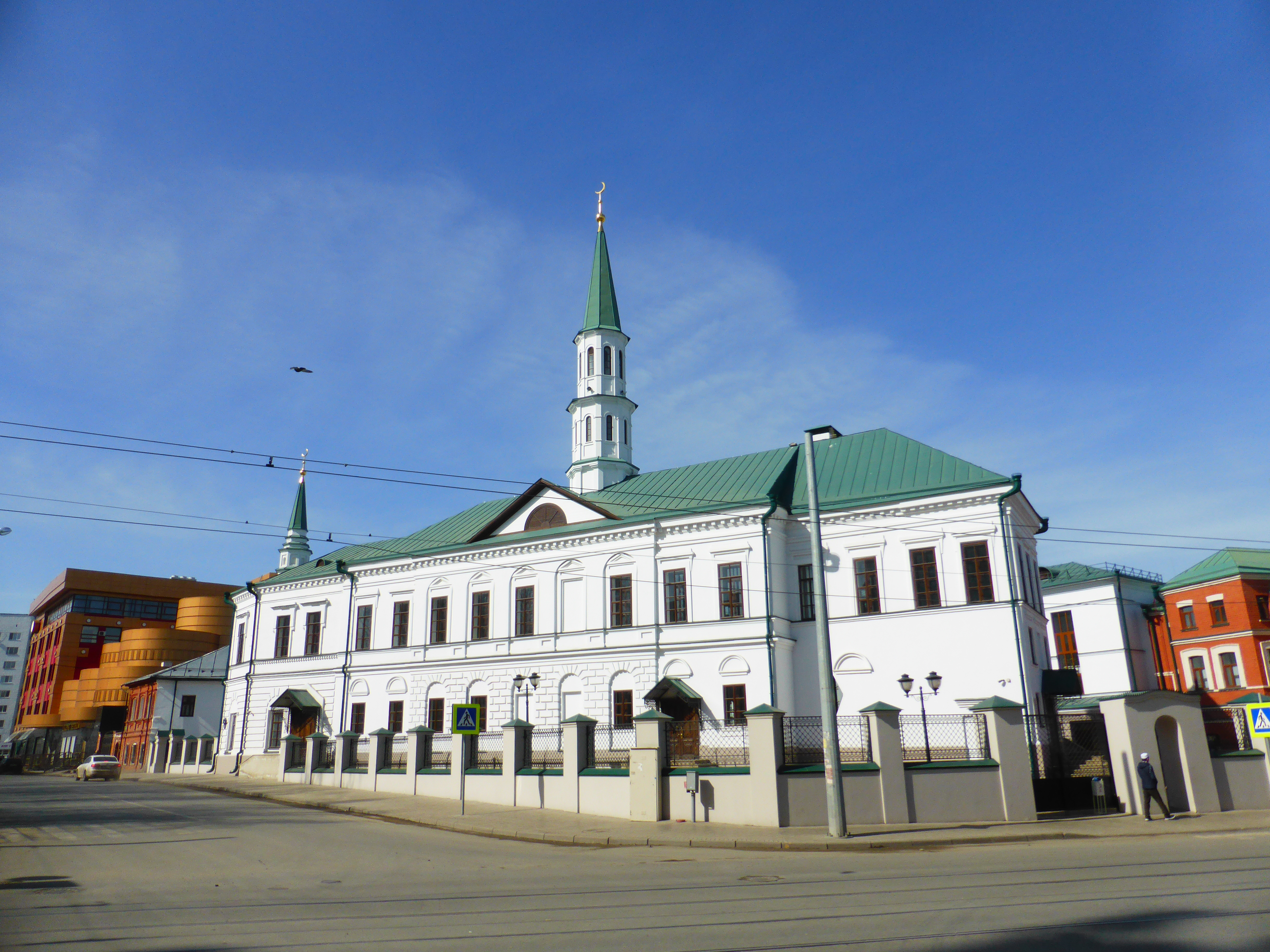
- The headquarters is located next to the Galeyevskaya mosque.
- Abbreviation: DUM RT (ДУМ РТ)
- Formation: 1992
- Headquarters: Kazan
- Official language: Tatar; Russian
- Mufti: Kamil Samigullin
- Affiliations: Sunni Islam, Hanafi school
- Website: https://dumrt.ru/ru/

The Spiritual Administration of Muslims of the Republic of Tatarstan (Tatar: Татарстан Җөмһүрияте мөселманнарының Диния нәзарәте, romanized: Tatarstan Cömhüriyəte möselmannarınıñ Diniyə nəzarəte, Russian: Духовное управление мусульман Республики Татарстан, romanized: Dukhovnoye upravlyeniye musulman Respubliki Tatarstan) is the muftiate of the Republic of Tatarstan (Russian Federation). It was established in 1992.

In 2014, there were around five thousand Muslim communities in Russia, more than a third in control of the Coordination Center of Muslims of the North Caucasus. The Spiritual Administration of Muslims of Tatarstan came in second with about of 25% control of the communities. The native Muslim population of Tatarstan are the Turkic Tatar people.

== Main task ==
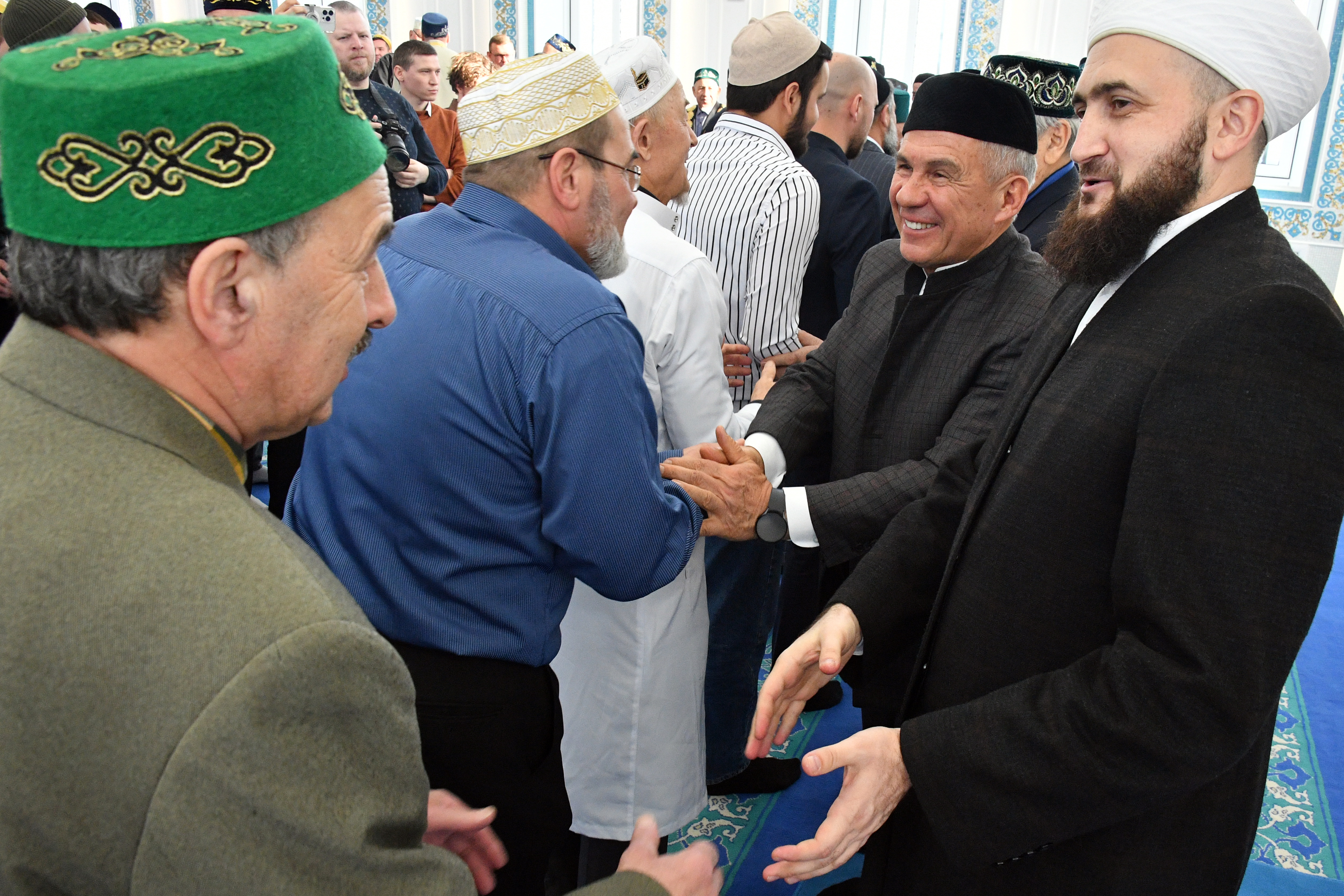
Head of Tatarstan, Rustam Minnikhanov with the mufti Kamil Samigullin (2024).

The main task of the administration is the "unification of Muslim religious organizations of the Republic of Tatarstan for joint confession and propagation of Islam; ensuring the canonical unity of Muslim religious organizations on the basis of the Qur'an and the Sunnah of the Prophet (may God bless him and greet him) in accordance with the religious direction of Imam Abu Hanifa; increasing the spiritual potential and strengthening the moral foundations of the Muslim community in the republic; creation of a strong spiritual and moral basis in society for raising the level of upbringing and education, comprehensive training of harmoniously developed, highly moral and highly educated individuals; achievement of inter-confessional and inter-ethnic peace and harmony in society; assistance to Muslims and Muslim religious organizations of the Republic of Tatarstan in realizing their legal rights and protecting the interests of freedom of religion and the spread of Islam in the republic".

== List of muftis ==
- Kamil Samigullin (2013–present)
- Ildus Fayzov (2011–2013)
- Gusman Iskhakov (1998–2011)
- Gabdulla Galiullin (1992–1998)

== See also ==
- Islam in Tatarstan
- Islam in Russia
- Spiritual Administration of the Muslims of the Chechen Republic
