= Ildus Fayzov =

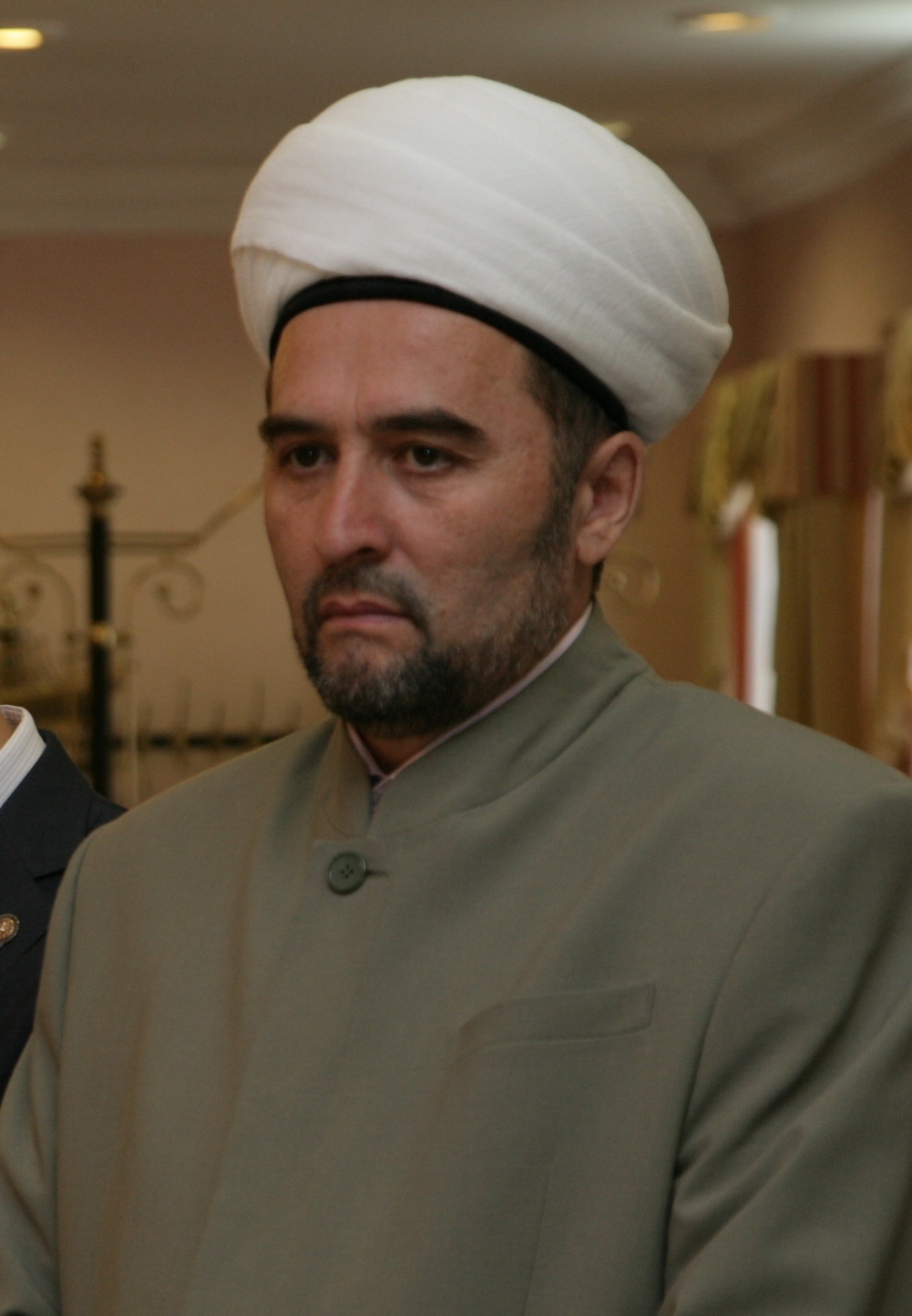
Faizov 2011.

Ildus Akhmetovich Fayzov (also Faizov, Russian: Ильдус Ахметович Файзов, Tatar: Илдус Әхмәт улы Фәизов / Фәиз, romanized: İldus Əxmət ulı Fəizov / Fəiz; born January 29, 1963, Tatar ASSR) is a Tatar imam, the former mufti of the Republic of Tatarstan (2011–2013). On July 19, 2012, Fayzov was the victim of a car bombing in Kazan, which was during the same day another Tatar imam Valiulla Yakupov was shot to death. Fayzov survived with injuries.

Before the incident, Fayzov had received death threats. Fayzov had been vocally against Wahhabism. He "introduced mandatory certification for imams of mosques, as a result of which imams suspected of preaching radical teachings lost their posts". The fundamentalist Islamic organization Hizb ut-Tahrir spoke negatively about Fayzov in their publications.

In 2013, Fayzov was replaced by Kamil Samigullin as the mufti of Tatarstan.
