= Salah Mezhiev =

Russian Chechen mufti (born 1977)

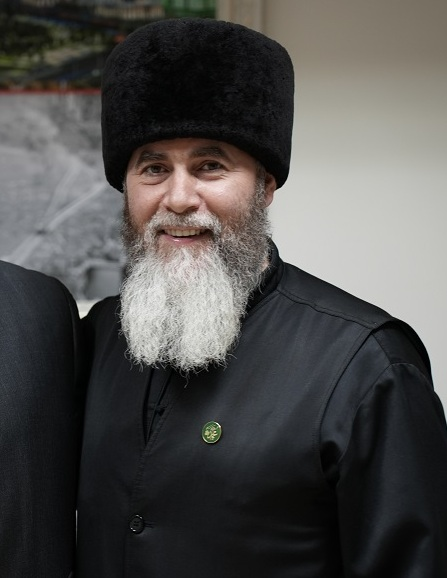
Salah Mezhiev, 2023.

Salah Mezhiev (Salah-haji Mitaevich Mezhiev, Russian: Салах Межиев / Салах-хаджи Митаевич Межиев; born 1977 Grozny) is the supreme mufti of Chechnya. He is also the chairperson of the Spiritual Administration of the Muslims of the Chechen Republic since 2014. Since 2024, he has held the position of Chairman of the Coordinating Center of North Caucasus Muslims.

In 2024, Mezhiev defended his dissertation on Al-Shafi'i in Cairo and received a PhD in Islamic Sciences.

Mezhiev has taken a stand against Wahhabism; "It should be recognized as an extremist sect and banned at a government level; these people should be called devils".

== See also ==
- 2016 international conference on Sunni Islam in Grozny
- Kamil Samigullin (mufti of Tatarstan)
