= Spiritual Administration of the Muslims of the Chechen Republic =

Chechen muftiate

- Нохчийн Республикин Бусалбан син урхалладар
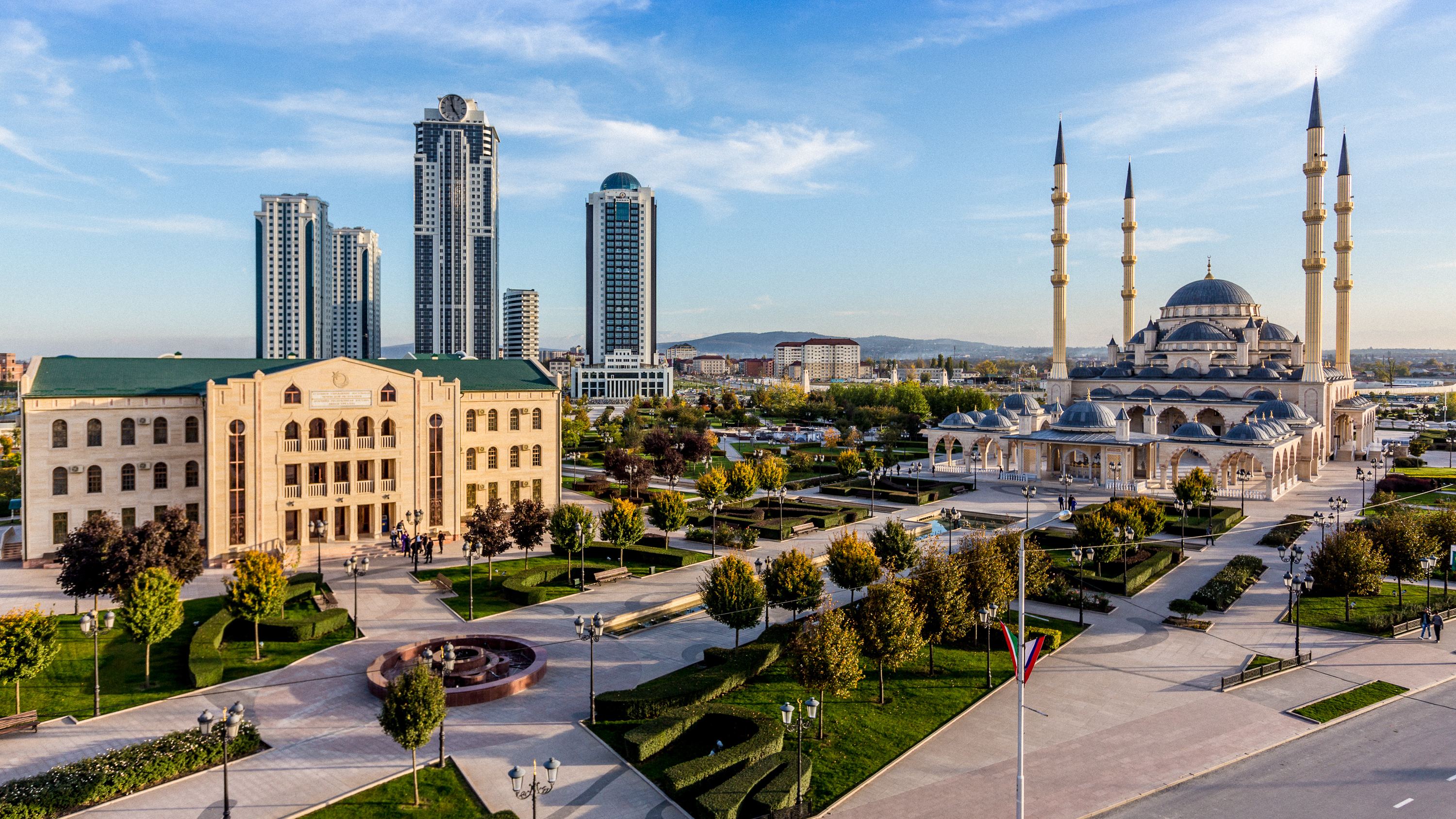
- The headquarters (left) and the Heart of Chechnya Mosque (right), Grozny
- Abbreviation: SAMCR
- Predecessor: Spiritual Administration of the Muslims of the Checheno-Ingush Republic
- Established: 1991 (35 years ago)
- Founded at: Grozny, Chechen Republic
- Legal status: Religious organisation
- Purpose: Fiqh; administrative; educational; philanthropic; religious studies; spiritual
- Headquarters: Grozny
- Locations: 1080 mosques; 18 madrasas; 2 higher education institutes
- Region served: Chechnya, Russia
- Official languages: Chechen; Russian
- Mufti: Salah Mezhiev
- Main organ: Majlis; Council of Ulama
- Affiliations: Sunni Islam, Shafi'i school
- Website: dumchr.ru

The Spiritual Administration of the Muslims of the Chechen Republic (Chechen: Нохчийн Республикин Бусалбан син урхалладар, romanized: Noxçiyn Respublikin Busalban sin urxalladar; Russian: Духовное управление мусульман Чеченской Республики) is the sole muftiate in Chechnya (Russian Federation). From 1991 to 2000 it operated on the territory of the unrecognized Chechen Republic of Ichkeria. Represented in the Coordinating Center of North Caucasus Muslims. Since 2024, the Mufti of Chechnya has held the position of Chairman of the Coordinating Center of North Caucasus Muslims.

== List of muftis ==
- Muhammad-Bashir Arsanukayev (1991–1993)
- Mahmud Garkayev (1993–1994)
- Muhammed-Khusein Alsabekov (1994)
- Akhmad Kadyrov (1994/5–2000)
- Akhmad Shamaiev (2000–2005)
- Sultan Mirsayev (2005–2014)
- Salah Mezhiev (2014–present)

== See also ==
- Spiritual Administration of Muslims of the Republic of Tatarstan

== Sources ==
- Roshchin, Mikhail; Lunkin, Roman (2005). "Ислам в Чеченской Республике" [Islam in the Chechen Republic]. In Bourdeaux, Michael; Filatov, Sergei (eds.). Современная религиозная жизнь России. Опыт систематического описания [Contemporary Religious Life of Russia. Systematic description experience] (in Russian). Vol. 3. Москва: Keston Institute; Logos. pp. 152–169. ISBN 5-98704-044-2.
