= Order For Services to the Republic of Dagestan =

Order "For Merit to the Republic of Dagestan"
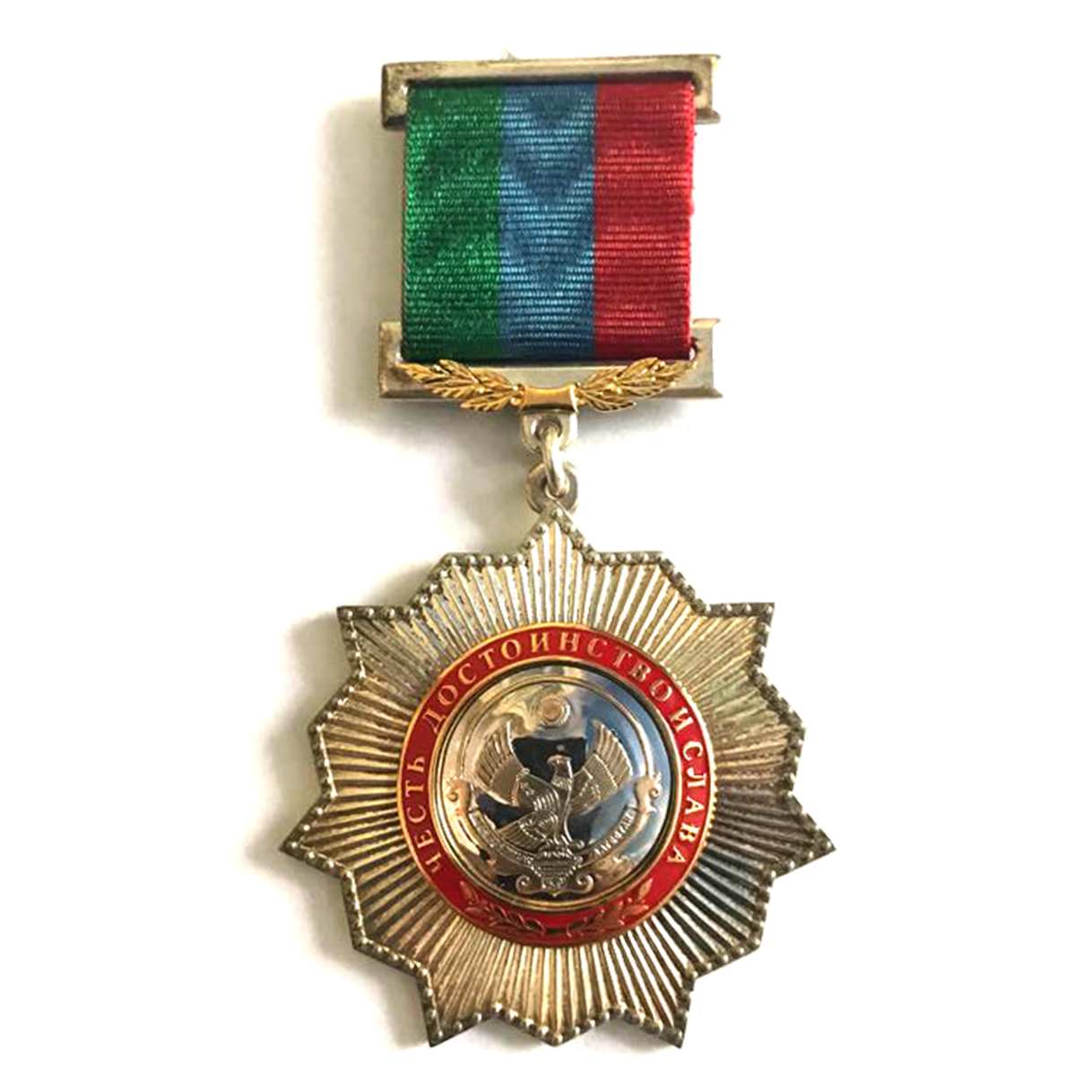
- Order "For Merit to the Republic of Dagestan"
- Type: Republican Meritorious Order
- Awarded for: Exemplary Services to the Republic of Dagestan
- Presented by: Head of the Republic of Dagestan
- Established: October 2, 1995
- Ribbon of the Order "For Merit to the Republic of Dagestan"

The Order "For Merit to the Republic of Dagestan" (Russian: Орден «За заслуги перед Республикой Дагестан»), is the highest meritorious order awarded by the Dagestani government for exemplary service in accordance with Article 7.2 of the Law No. 6 “On State Awards of the Republic of Dagestan”.

== Notable recipients ==
- Phase Alievа — Knight of the Order No. 1
- Aliev Muhu Gimbatovich (2010)
- Aliev, Shamil Gimbatovich (2013)
- Abdulatipov Ramazan Gadzhimuradovich
- Ahmad Afandi Abdulaev
- Abdulbekov, Zagalav Abdulbekovich (2015)
- Akhmedov, Magomed Akhmedovich (2015)
- Abakarov, Khizri Magomedovich (2020)
- Abdulmuslimov, Abdulmuslim Mukhudinovich (2020)
- Amirkhanov, Abdulpat Gadzhievich (2022)
- Baachilov, Magomed Huseynovic (2016)
- Hajiyev, Gadzhi Muslimovich (2010)
- Hasanova, Mui Rashidovna (2010)
- Gamzatov, Gamzat Magomedovich (2010)
- Gamzatova, Hapisat Magomedovna (2011)
- Golikova, Tatiana Alekseevna
- Gazimagomedov, Magomedrasul Mukhtarovich (2018)
- Gadzhimagomedov, Muslim Gamzatovich (2019)
- Dzasokhov, Alexander Sergeevich (November 2017)
- Jamaludinov, Magomed Kazievich
- Kerimov, Suleiman Abusaidovich (April 2013)
- Ibragimov, Ibrahim Magomedovich (2014)
- Kamilov, Ibragimkhan Kamilovich (2015)
- Kerimov, Magomed Khizrievich
- Kazhlaev, Murad Magomedovich
- Kaziev, Shapi Magomedovich (April 2016)
- Murtazaliev, Omar Murtazalievich (2009)
- Makhachev, Gadzhi Nuhievich (2011)
- Makhachev, Islam Ramazanovich (2022)
- Magomaev, Huseyn Saigidovich (2011)
- Makhulov, Magomed Makhulovich (2013)
- Magomedov, Ziyavudin Gadzhievich (2013)
- Magomedov, Magomedali Magomedovich (May 2014)
- Nazhmudinov, Kasum Huseynovich (2013)
- Nurmagomedov, Khabib Abdulmanapovich (2018, December 5, 2019)
- Nurmagomedov, Abdulmanap Magomedovich (December 5, 2019)
- Osmanov, Ahmed Ibrahimovich (2014)
- Vladimir Putin (September 2014)
- Sadulaev, Abdulrashid Bulachevich
- Tolboev, Magomed Omarovich (2011)
- Tolboev, Taigib Omarovich
- Saygidpasha Umakhanov
- Sergey Melikov
- Khloponin, Alexander Gennadievich (September 2015)
- Chalaev, Shirvani Ramazanovich
- Shakhov, Shahabas Kuramagomedovich (2016)
- Shaimiev, Mintimer Sharipovich (April 2017)
- Yusupov, Magomed Yusupovich (2010)
- Lev Kuznetsov (March 2016)
- Samuel Eto’o (March 2014)
- Aleksandr Karelin (September 2017)

== See also ==
- Awards and decorations of the Russian Federation
