= Ismail Berdiyev =

Russian Karachay-Cherkess mufti (1954–2024)

- Бердилени Исмаил-хаджи
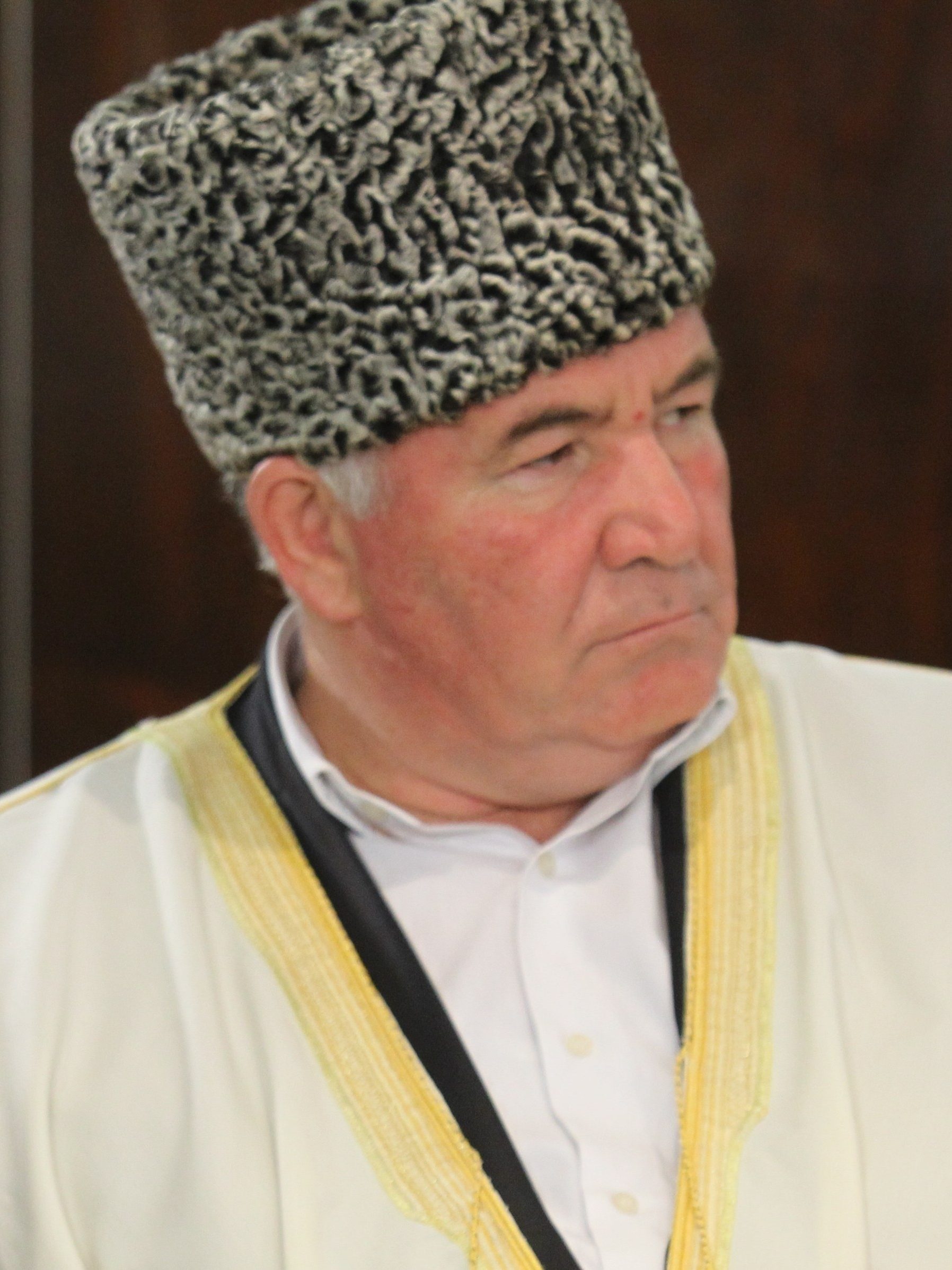
- Berdiyev in 2011
- Title: Mufti

Personal life
- Born: 27 February 1954 Belye Body, Kazakh SSR, USSR (now Aqsukent, Kazakhstan)
- Died: 5 August 2024 (aged 70)
- Era: Modern
- Education: Mir-i Arab mаdrаsasi, Bukhara; Imam Ismail al-Bukhari Islamic Institute, Tashkent.

Religious life
- Religion: Islam
- Denomination: Sunni

Ismail Aliyevich Berdiyev (Karachay-Balkar: Бердилени Алиини джашы Исмаил-хаджи, romanized: Berdileni Aliini jashy Ismail-khaji; Russian: Исмаил Алиевич Бердиев; 27 February 1954 – 5 August 2024) was a Russian Sunni mufti from Karachay-Cherkessia. He gained worldwide attention when he proclaimed that "all women" should be subjected to the practice of female genital mutilation (FGM).

== Biography ==
Ismail Berdiyev was born on 27 February 1954 in the village of Belye Body in the Kazakh Soviet Socialist Republic (now Aqsukent in Kazakhstan), where his parents were expelled from North Caucasus with other Karachay people, when they were accused of collaboration with the Nazis in 1943 by Soviet regime. He returned to Karachay-Cherkessia with his family in 1957.

Berdiyev died on 5 August 2024, at the age of 70.

== Controversies ==
=== Female genital mutilation ===
Berdiyev, the mufti of Russia's North Caucasus region of Karachayevo-Cherkessia, stated that FGM 'does not contradict the dogmas of Islam', and that this was a way to 'eliminate sexual depravity'. He also claimed this was a way to reduce 'lechery' and 'sexuality', stating that "All women should be cut, so that there is no depravity on Earth..." The mufti made his comments following publication of a report by the Russian Justice Initiative (RJI), stating that FGM is widespread in some parts of Dagestan. He was supported by Vsevolod Chaplin, a former spokesman for the Russian Orthodox Church.
