= Ratbek hadji Nysanbayev =

Kazakhstani religious figure (1940–2026)

Rätbek Nysanbaiūly
- Рәтбек Нысанбайұлы
- Born: 7 November 1940; Saryagash District, South Kazakhstan Region, Kazakh SSR, Soviet Union
- Died: January 2026 (aged 85); Kazakhstan
- Known for: Grand Mufti of Kazakhstan (1990–2000)

Qajı Rätbek Nysanbaiūly (Kazakh: Рәтбек Нысанбайұлы; 7 November 1940 – January 2026) was a Kazakh cleric who served as the first Grand Mufti of Kazakhstan from 12 January 1990 to 24 June 2000. He was appointed by President Nursultan Nazarbayev. Nysanbayev died in January 2026, at the age of 85.

Religious titles
Preceded by None (position created)	Grand Mufti of Kazakhstan; 1990–2000	Succeeded by Absattar Derbisali
