= Ruslan Kurbanov (activist) =

Russian political expert, social activist and columnist (born 1976)

- Born: 26 October 1976 (age 49); Kurakh, Dagestan, Russia
- Occupations: political expert, social activist and columnist

Ruslan Kurbanov (Russian: Руслан Курбанов, Lezgian: Къурбанрин Руслан) is a Russian political expert, social activist and columnist, director of the Altair foundation for the support of humanitarian initiatives, and a senior fellow of the Institute of Oriental Studies of the Russian Academy of Sciences. Born October 26, 1976 in South-Dagestanian village Kurakh, he is an ethnic Lezgin. His research has been presented in numerous publications and broadcast through various news outlets, and he has been a guest speaker on national radio and TV programs.

== Education and Scientific activities ==
Kurbanov has received a Specialist Diploma in Economics from Dagestan State University. In 2004, he earned a PhD degree in Politics from Saint Petersburg State University. In 2002 – 2005, he served as Head of the Department of Conflicts and Informational Security at the Center for Strategic Research and Political Technology in the Republic of Dagestan. In 2006, he conducted lectures at the Abou-Nour University in Damascus. Since 2007, he has served as a Senior Fellow of the Institute of Oriental Studies of the Russian Academy of Sciences. He has authored numerous monographs and research articles on Islam, social and legal aspects of Muslim community and its integration in non-Muslim countries.

== Professional activities ==
In 2003, he held a position of Editor-in-chief of daily news program “Dagestan News” on State Television and Radio Broadcasting Company “Dagestan”. In 2003–2005, he was an author and linkman of historical TV show “Seven Winds”. In 2008–2009, Dr. Kurbanov headed the department known as “World beyond the West” of Foundation for Effective Politics. In the same period, he was Editor-in-chief of “The Senate” program of the Russian Federation Council. In 2011–2012, he worked as Editor-in-chief of "Caucasian Politics" analytical portal. Since 2012, he has directed the foundation for support of humanitarian initiatives “Altair”.

== Public activities ==
2003–present: Head, Young Political Researches School at the Regional Center of Ethnopolitical Researches of the Dagestan scientific Center of the Russian Academy of Sciences. 2004–present: Head, socio-cultural movement “Young Republic”. 2006–present: Member, Research Committee on Human Rights, Russian Association of Political Science. 2007 – present: Co-chairman, Russian Congress of Caucasian Nations. 2009-2012: Head, Experts Council of Working Group for Development of Public Dialogue and Institutes of Civil Society at the Russian Civic Chamber. 2011–present: included in the list of candidates to Russian State Duma from Dagestani regional public organization “Dagestan Civil Union” along with other candidates like Ramazan Abdulatipov, Sergey Reshulsky and others. 2010 – present: Head, Experts Council Committee for Cooperation with Mass Media at Russian muftis Council 2013 – present: Vice-president, Federal Lezgin National Cultural Autonomy.

== See articles in English ==
- Kurbanov R. Globalization of Muslim consciousness in the Caucasus: Islamic call and jihad
- Kurbanov R. Revival of the North Caucasian Umma in the light of Russia’s foreign policy flaws in the Islamic world
- Kurbanov R. The unpredictable triangle: Azerbaijan, Iran, Israel
- Kurbanov R. Muslim Scholars Meet in Russia on Radicalism
- Kurbanov R. Banning Hadiths and Seerah in Russia
- Kurbanov R. Battles around hijab in Russia. Prohibitions and murders
- Kurbanov R. Prohibition of Hadiths and Prophetic Seerah as a chance for Russian Muslims
- Kurbanov R. "Russian Ijmaa" on Jihad and Ideological Split of Muslim Community
- Kurbanov R. Tatarstan:Smooth Islamization Sprinkled with Blood
- Kurbanov R. Russian Imams killed in dozen
- Corruption forms ethnic “enclaves”
- “Young believers turn into a serious force in the North Caucasus”
- "Radicalization of Muslim young people"
- Azerbaijan checks the strength of Russian State
- No clear picture of investigation into Moscow metro terror acts
