= Marat Gatin =

Tatar politician

Marat Gatin (born in Arsk, Tatarstan) is the minister for Interaction with Religious Organizations, a Presidential department in Tatarstan. He is a graduate of Al-Azhar University with a specialization in the Arabic language and Islam, Kazan State Pedagogical University with a specialization in philology, and attended Cairo University with a specialization in political science.
