= Kamil Samigullin =

Mufti of Tatarstan

- Камиль Самигуллин; Камил Сәмигуллин
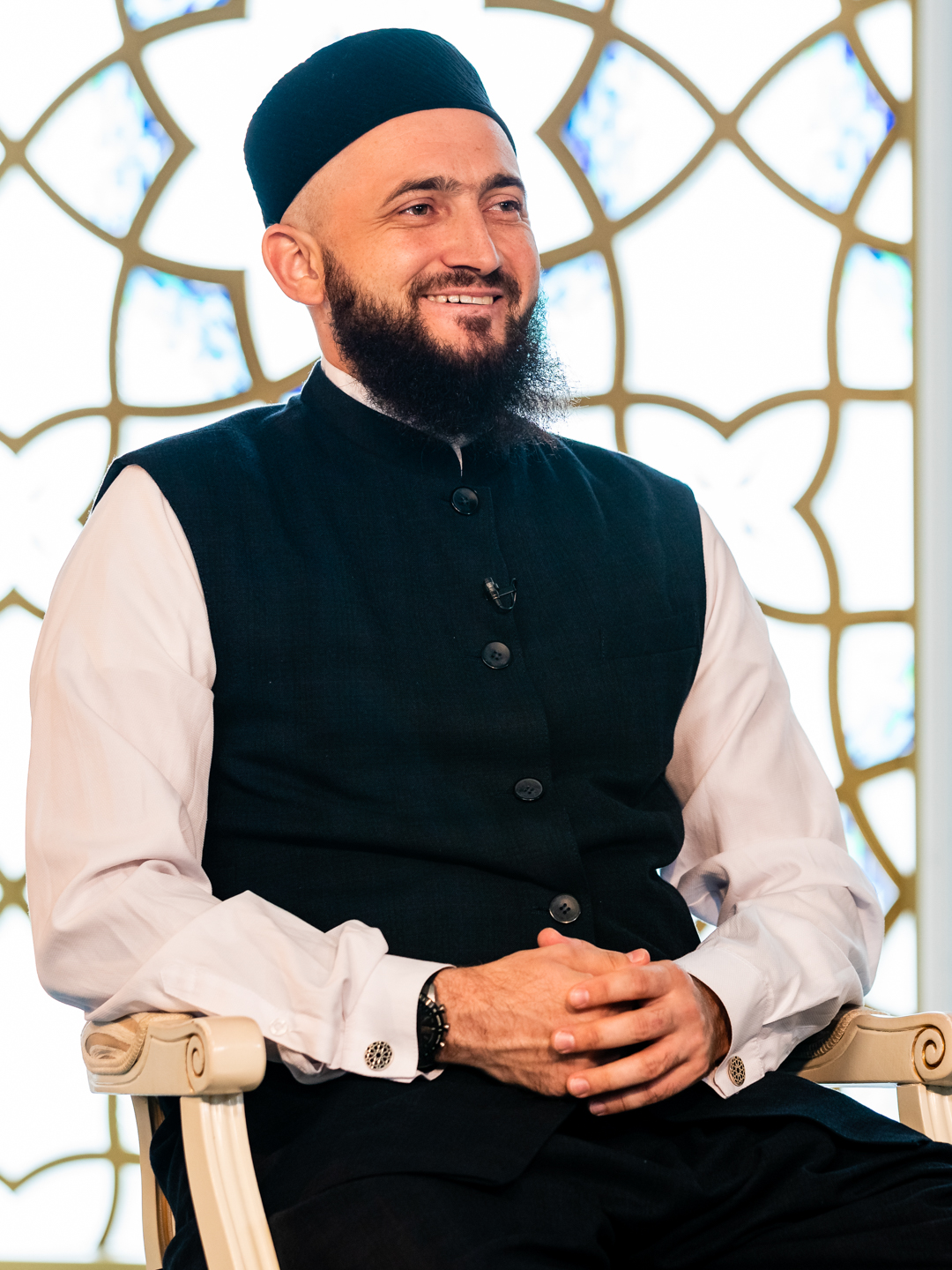
- Born: March 22, 1985 (age 41); Krasnogorsky, Mari ASSR, Soviet Union
- Other names: Abu Akhmad al-Kazani, Kamil khazrat, كامل سميع الله (Kamil Samiullah)
- Predecessor: Ildus Fayzov (2011–2013)
- Website: https://dumrt.ru/ru/

Kamil Iskanderovich Samigullin (Russian: Камиль Искандерович Самигуллин, Tatar: Камил Искәндәр улы Сәмигуллин, romanized: Kamil İskəndər ulı Səmiğullin; born March 22, 1985, Mari ASSR, Soviet Union) is a Russian religious figure, acting as the mufti of the Republic of Tatarstan. He is also the chairman of the Spiritual Administration of Muslims of the Republic of Tatarstan, and a Hanafi-Maturidi scholar.

Samigullin was born into a Tatar family in Krasnogorsky, in the current day Mari El Republic. Samigullin graduated from the Turkish İsmailağa in 2007 and belongs to the Naqshbandi order. Samigullin has expressed great affection towards the Turkish Risale-i Nur and Nurism. Before this, Samigullin had studied in North Caucasus Islamic University of Makhachkala. Samigullin is a Hafiz of the Quran. In 2022, Samigullin received the title of Doctor of Islamic Sciences after having defended his dissertation in Arabic on the topic "The contribution of Tatar theologians to the Quranic sciences and the study of the rasma (writing rules) of the Quran". Samigullin is fluent in both Arabic and Turkish.

Samigullin has been the mufti of Tatarstan since April 13, 2013. Earlier positions include being the imam in Tyumen region as well as the imam of the Tınıçlıq mosque in Kazan.

In Russian media, Kamil Samigullin is also known as Abu Akhmad al-Kazani (Note: Russian: Абу Ахмад аль-Казани) and Kamil khazrat Samigullin. (Note: Russian: Камиль хазрат Самигуллин Tatar: Камил хәзрәт Сәмигуллин (Kamil xəzrət Səmiğullin)) In Arabic, his name is spelled كامل سميع الله (Kamil Samiullah).

== Views ==
In March 2026, Samigullin participated in a memorial ceremony for Iran’s Ayatollah Ali Khamenei at the Iranian Consulate in Kazan, who had previously been assassinated in a joint operation by Israel and United States. At the event, Samigullin expressed: “What the United States and Israel have done to your country cannot be justified. This is misanthropy, a true act of hatred. The Iranian people have lost their spiritual father.”

When Russia invaded Ukraine in 2022, Samigullin stated that it was "inevitable and justified". Samigullin had already supported the occupation of Crimea in 2014.

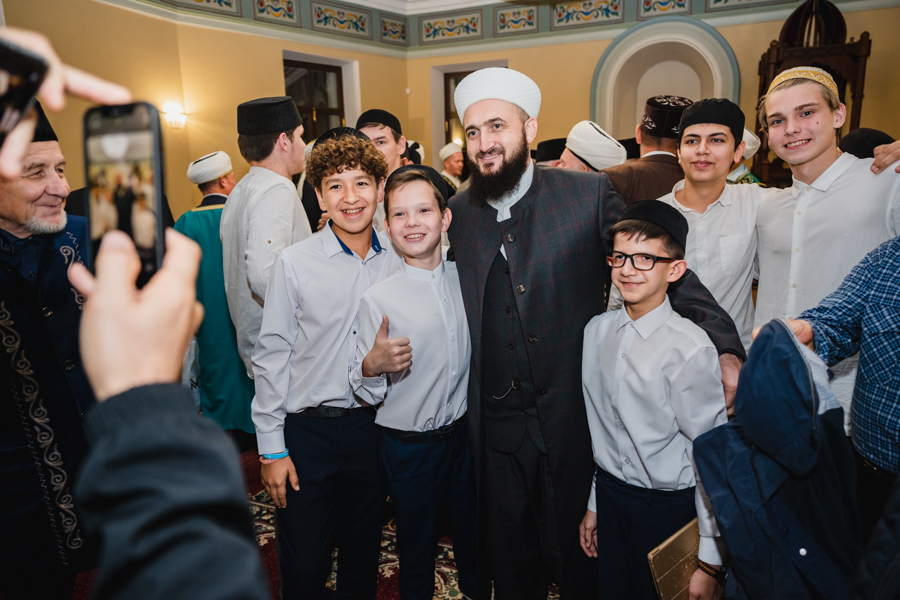
Galievsky mosque, 2023.

Samigullin has been involved in State Duma meetings "to combat LGBT propaganda." In 2022, he stated: "Since the start of the special operation [invasion of Ukraine], we have seen an aggressive uprising in our country. Pro-Western, non-traditional views on family and moral issues have grown sharply." In 2016, Samigullin had expressed that "people with non-traditional orientations should repent."

When the anti-Semitic riots took place in Dagestan in October 2023, including the seizure of the airport in Makhachkala, Samigullin proposed that the perpetrators should be granted an "amnesty." Samigullin added: "It is obvious that the mass persecution in Dagestan was organized by external actors, although of course provoked by Israel. The Dagestan incident is also a pure provocation used by Western intelligence services, playing on the feelings of believers".

Since the Gaza Genocide began, Samigullin has shown strong support for the Palestinians, blaming "Zionist invaders" and "the collective West that supports genocide."

When Samigullin was asked about the Islamic tradition of Tatars, he replied as follows: "This question gives rise to various interpretations, but the fact is that our tradition is the Sunnah. We have been following the Madhhab of Abū Ḥanīfa and the Aqīdah of Abu Mansur al-Maturidi for over a thousand years. This is our tradition, and everything else is an external influence that we do not accept." Samigullin has emphasized the importance of preserving ones native language and thus, has held Friday sermons in Tatar.

Samigullin has spoken against Wahabbism, which he thinks should be banned at a government level. The preceding mufti of Tatarstan, Ildus Fayzov, had been a victim of suspected radical Islamic terrorist attack in 2012 when his car exploded.
