= Absattar Derbisali =

Kazakh Islamic scholar (1947–2021)

- Әбсаттар Дербісәлі
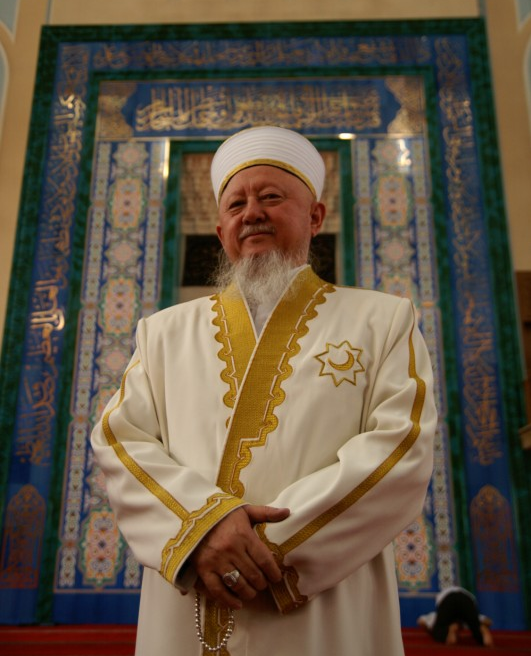
- Derbisali in 2009
- Born: 15 September 1947; Tulkibas District, South Kazakhstan Region, Kazakh SSR, Soviet Union
- Died: 15 July 2021 (aged 73)
- Known for: Grand Mufti of Kazakhstan (2000–2013)

Äbsattar Bağysbaiūly Derbısälı (Kazakh: Әбсаттар Бағысбайұлы Дербісәлі; 15 September 1947 – 15 July 2021) was Grand Mufti of Kazakhstan. He served as mufti from 24 June 2000 to 18 February 2013.

In February 2013, Derbissali resigned to continue his activity in science and education.

On February 26, 2013 Derbissali was appointed Director of Suleimenov Oriental Studies Institute.

Derbissali was a member of the Academy of Science of Kazakhstan. He was a Doctor of Philology, a professor, an orientalist and a diplomat. He held a diplomatic rank of the first class adviser.

Derbissali was the author of 400 theoretical articles and practical developments in the Arab language and literature, ancient periods of Kazakh literature and culture, Kazakhstan's spiritual connections with the Muslim countries of Middle East, as well as the history of Islam, Quran and the sayings of Muhammad.

Religious titles
Preceded by Ratbek Nysanbayev	Supreme Mufti of Kazakhstan; 2000 – 2013	Succeeded by Yerzhan Mayamerov
