= Félix-Marie Abel =

French archaeologist and geographer (1878–1953)

Félix-Marie Abel

Félix-Marie Abel (29 December 1878 – 24 March 1953) was a French professor, geographer and archaeologist at the École Biblique in Jerusalem. A Dominican priest, he was one of the most prominent bible scholars in the end of Ottoman era and British Mandate era. His work "remains even today the authority on the Greek sources for Palestine", according to Benedict T. Viviano.

== Biography ==
Abel was born in Saint-Uze, in the Drôme department, on 29 December 1878. He was educated at the Preparatory Seminary of Valence. He was ordained on 1 February 1897 at Saint-Maximin. In 1897 he arrived in Jerusalem to study in the École Biblique founded by Marie-Joseph Lagrange; Lagrange had recruited him (and fr:Raphaël Savignac) to help him get "a clear grasp of physical environment and the cultural framework of the Bible". Abel graduated in 1900. In 1905 he became a professor at the École Biblique teaching Church History, Greek, topography, archaeology, and Coptic; he served there until his death in 1953. Starting in 1906, he served as guide to scriptural tours through Palestine, Phoenicia, and Syria.

== Work ==
He published a number of studies in various disciplines—linguistics, geography, and history. His Grammaire du Grec Biblique is a grammar of Biblical Greek (1927). Preceded by a volume on Palestine in the Guide Bleu series of travel guides, his Géographie de la Palestine (Paris, 1933–1938) treats the political, historical and physical geography from the most remote times until the Byzantine period. The book has two volumes, the first a physical geography, and the second a historical geography. The study supports, for instance, the theory of William F. Lynch that the Essenes lived in a set of small caves directly above Ein Gedi (which Lynch had visited in 1848), a theory later discredited by scholarship. The topographical quality of his work was quite influential: according to Jerome Murphy-O'Connor, "The ten maps he prepared have served as the prime, but often unacknowledged, source of much subsequent topographical identification". In 1952 he published Histoire de la Palestine depuis la conquête d'Alexandre jusqu'à l'invasion arabe, a comprehensive history. He also edited and translated the Book of Joshua for the École Biblique's edition of the bible, translated the Books of the Maccabees and identified several battle sites of the Maccabean Revolt and other places that related to Hasmonean dynasty.

He contributed articles to the Revue Biblique and the Catholic Encyclopedia.

With Louis-Hugues Vincent he published a number of works, the most famous of which are the three volumes of topographic-archaeological-historical studies on the city of Jerusalem. They worked together also at the excavations of Emmaus, on research on the Cave of the Patriarchs in Hebron, and at the Church of the Nativity. With Savignac he argued that archeological remains beneath the St. Stephen's Basilica, Jerusalem, which houses the École Biblique, were those of the basilica built by Empress Eudocia in the 5th century CE, but not that this was also the site of the stoning of Saint Stephen the Protomartyr.

== Bibliography, books ==
- Vincent, L.-H., and F.-M. Abel. Jérusalem: Recherches de topographie, d'archéologie et d'histoire
  - Vol. 1, Jérusalem antique. Paris, 1912.
  - Vol. 2 (1st part), Jérusalem nouvelle. Paris, 1914.
  - Vol. 2 (2nd part), Jérusalem nouvelle. Paris, 1922.
- Vincent, L.-H.; Abel, Félix-Marie (1914). Bethléem, le sanctuaire de la nativité (in French). Vol. 1. Paris: Paris, J. Gabalda.
- Vincent, L.-H.; Abel, Félix-Marie (1923). Hébron: Le Haram el-Khalîl, sépulture des patriarches (in French). Ernest Leroux.
- Vincent, L.-H.; Abel, Félix-Marie (1932). Emmaüs, Sa Basilique Et Son Histoire (in French). Vol. 1. Paris.
- Abel, Félix-Marie. Grammaire du Grec biblique suivie d'un choix de Papyrus. Paris, 1927.
- Abel, F. M. (1933). Geographie de la Palestine. Vol. 1 2 Geographie Politique. Librairie Lecoffre.
- Abel, F. M. (1938). Geographie de la Palestine. Vol. 2 Geographie Politique. Les villes. Librairie Lecoffre.
- Abel, F. M. (1949). Les livres des Maccabées. Éditions du Cerf.
- Abel, F.-M. Histoire de la Palestine depuis la conquête d'Alexandre jusqu'à l'invasion arabe. Paris, 1952.

== Bibliography, articles (partial list) ==
- Abel, F.-M. (1907). "Document ephigraphique sur le patriarche Eustochios". Revue Biblique. 16: 275-276.
- Abel, F.-M. (1920). "La maison d'Abraham a Hebron". Journal of the Palestine Oriental Society (in French). I: 138-142.
- Abel, F.-M. (1922). "Le Tombeau d'lsaie". Journal of the Palestine Oriental Society (in French). II: 25-33.
- Abel, F.-M. (1922). "Le culte de Jonas en Palestine". Journal of the Palestine Oriental Society (in French). II: 175-183.
- Abel, F.-M. (1924). "Le Sud Palestinien d'apres la carte mosaique de Madaba". Journal of the Palestine Oriental Society (in French). IV: 107-117.
- Abel, F.-M. (1924). "L'etat de la Cite de Jerusalem au XII siecle". Jerusalem 1920-1922. London: 33–40.
- Abel, F.-M. (1939–40). "La Liste des Donations des Baibars en Palestine d'apres la Charte de 663 H. (1265)". Journal of the Palestine Oriental Society. XIX: 38–44.

== See also ==
- Pro-Jerusalem Society (1918-1926) - Père Abel was a member of its leading Council
