= Louis-Hugues Vincent =

French archaeologist and monk of the Dominican Order (1872-1960)

Louis-Hugues Vincent OP (31 August 1872 – 30 December 1960) was a French archaeologist, friar of the Dominican Order, who was educated at Jerusalem's École Biblique. He undertook important archaeological research in Palestine (region), primarily during the Mandatory Palestine period.

== Biography ==
He was born on 31 August 1872 in Isère in the commune of Vernioz, near Lyon. Immediately after his Dominican novitiate training, in 1891, he was sent to Jerusalem at the Biblical School ("École Biblique") of St. Stephen's Basilica, founded a year before by Marie-Joseph Lagrange. Vincent remained there all his life, with the exception of long stays in France during the World Wars.

At the École Biblique, Louis Vincent studied and was ordained a Catholic priest. Soon he became one of the most learned scholars in the field of biblical archaeology, including ceramics and ancient objects, lecturing on archaeology at the school. He came to know all the archaeological sites in the Holy Land.

He carried out excavations with Father Roland de Vaux in Tirzah, now in the West Bank. Vincent was also involved in the excavations conducted at the underground street of Via Dolorosa in Jerusalem during the 1930s, and which he proposed may have been part of the Antonia Fortress, a view later rejected by Pierre Benoit who claimed that it was merely the pavement of the eastern forum of Aelia Capitolina built by Hadrian in the 2nd century CE.

He published many articles in the Revue Biblique journal, of which he was the editor-in-chief between 1931 and 1938.

Vincent died on 30 December 1960. His tomb is in the Old City of Jerusalem in the courtyard of the Dominican convent near the Damascus Gate.

== Awards and distinctions ==
- Honorary member of the Academy of Inscriptions and Belles-Lettres
- Honorary member of the British Academy
- Member of the Order of the British Empire MBE
- Cross of the Order of Leopold (Belgium)
- Legion of Honor of France

== See also ==
- Pro-Jerusalem Society (1918-1926) - "le Rev. Père Vincent" was a member of its leading Council

== Bibliography ==
- Vincent, L.-H., and F.-M. Abel. Jérusalem: Recherches de topographie, d'archéologie et d'histoire
  - Vol. 1, Jérusalem antique. Paris, 1912.
  - Vol. 2, Jérusalem nouvelle. Paris, 1922.
- Vincent, L.-H.; Abel, F.-M. (1923). Hébron: Le Haram el-Khalîl, sépulture des patriarches (in French). Ernest Leroux.
- Vincent, L.-H.; Abel, F.-M. (1932). Emmaüs, Sa Basilique Et Son Histoire (in French). Vol. 1. Paris.
