= Pro-Jerusalem Society =

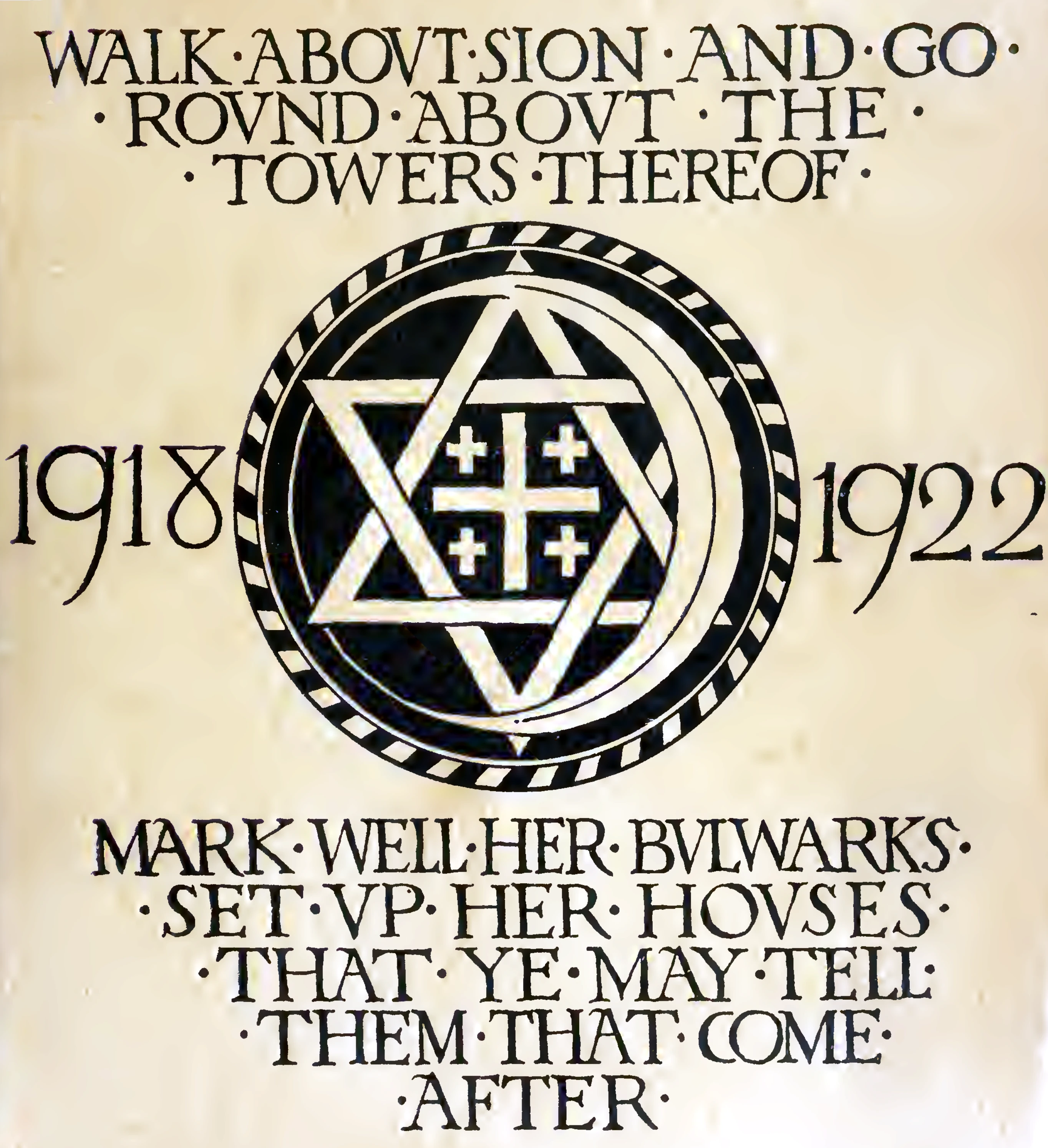
The front cover of the Society's 1922 report.

The Pro-Jerusalem Society was a society for the "preservation and advancement of the interests of Jerusalem", including its amenities, antiquities, cultural institutions and education. It was founded in 1918 in Jerusalem by Sir Ronald Storrs, the British military governor of the city, and Charles Robert Ashbee, an architect and leader of the Arts and Crafts Movement. It was dissolved in 1926, the year Storrs was replaced as Governor of Jerusalem and Judea.

== History ==
In 1918, during the period of martial law in Jerusalem, Storrs conceived the idea of establishing a "committee of the three races" with the purpose of "developing a common spirit among the communities of Jerusalem." The goal of the society was "the protection of and the addition to the amenities of Jerusalem and its neighbourhood", including general public works, the preservation of antiquities, the establishment of museums, and the encouragement of handicrafts.

Trustees of the society included the Arab Mayor of Jerusalem, the Grand Mufti, the Greek Orthodox Patriarch of Jerusalem, the Latin (Catholic) Patriarch, the Armenian Patriarch, the Anglican Bishop, the Chief Rabbi, and the President of the Jewish lay community.

While Governor of Jerusalem, Storrs devoted much of his time and effort to Pro-Jerusalem, for which he raised considerable funds during his leave in Egypt, the United Kingdom, and the United States.

== Board of Members ==
The Society was led by the Pro-Jerusalem Council, consisting, as of c. 1920-1922, of the following notables:

=== Board of Members of the Pro-Jerusalem Society (the list published in the Society's Bulletins) ===
- "Hon. President: The Rt. Hon. Sir Herbert Samuel, High Commissioner of Palestine.
- President: Ronald Storrs C.M.G., C.B.E., District Governor of Jerusalem.

=== Council ===
- Hon. Secretary: C.R. Ashbee, Civic Advisor to the City of Jerusalem.
- Hon. Member: The Rt Hon. Viscount Milner K.C.B.
- Members: The Mayor of Jerusalem. The Director of Antiquities. His Eminence the Grand Mufti. His Reverence the President of the Franciscan Community, the Custodian of the Holy Land. His Reverence the President of the Dominican Community. His Beatitude the Greek Patriarch. His Beatitude the Armenian Patriarch. The President of the Jewish Community. The Chairman of the Zionist Commission. Le Rev. Père Abel, École Biblique de St. Etienne. Le Capitaine Barluzzi. M. Ben Yahuda [ Eliezer Ben-Yehuda ?]. Cap. K.A.C. Creswell M.B.E., Inspector of Monuments G.S., O.E.T. Prof. Patrick Geddes. R.A. Harari. Musa Kazem Pasha El Husseini, Ex-Mayor of Jerusalem. Capt. Mackay, Inspector of Monuments, G.S., O.E.T. Mr. Meyuhas. Mr. Lazarus Paul, acting representative of the Armenian Patriarch. Col. L. Popham. Mr. E.T. Richmond [British architect in charge of restoration on the Temple Mount]. Mr. D.G. Salame, Ex-vice-Mayor of Jerusalem. Dr. Nahum Slousch. Mr. Jacob Spafford [member of the American Colony]. Col. Waters Taylor, C.B.E. Le Rev. Père Vincent, École Biblique de St. Etienne. Mr. John Whiting, Hon. Treasurer [member of the American Colony]. Mr. David Yellin, Vice Mayor of Jerusalem."
