= Evliya Çelebi =

Turkish traveler and writer (1611–1684)

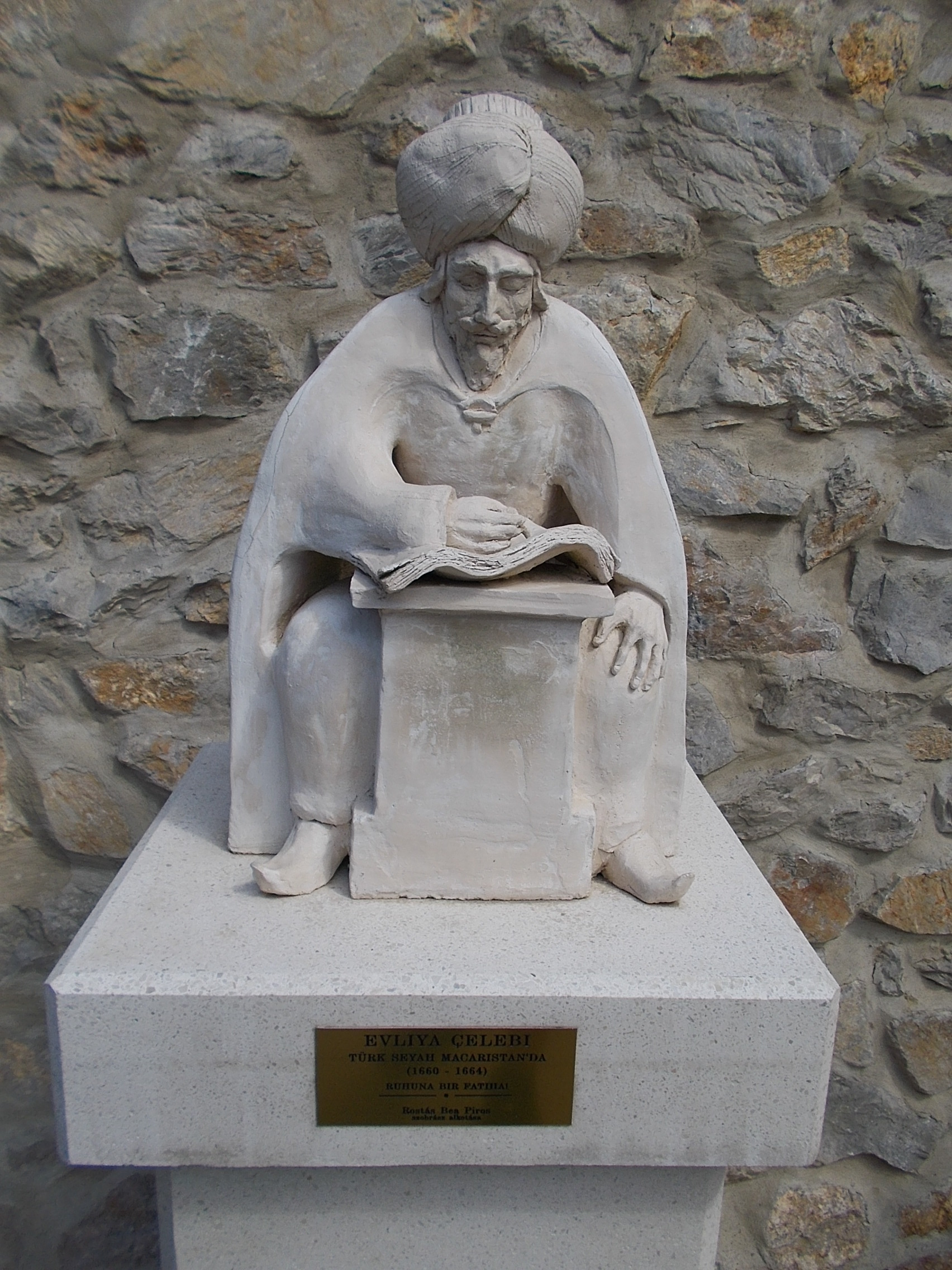
- A statue commemorating Evliya Çelebi in Hungary
- Born: Dervish Mehmed Zillî; 25 March 1611; Constantinople, Ottoman Empire (present-day Istanbul, Turkey)
- Died: March 1684 (aged 72–73); Constantinople or Cairo, Ottoman Empire
- Known for: Seyahatnâme ("The Travelogue")

Dervish Mehmed Zillî (25 March 1611 – 1684), known as Evliya Çelebi (Ottoman Turkish: اوليا چلبى), was an Ottoman Turkish explorer who traveled through his home country during its cultural zenith as well as neighboring lands. He travelled for over 40 years, recording his commentary in a travelogue called the Seyahatnâme ("Book of Travel"). The name Çelebi is an honorific meaning "gentleman" or "man of God".

== Life ==
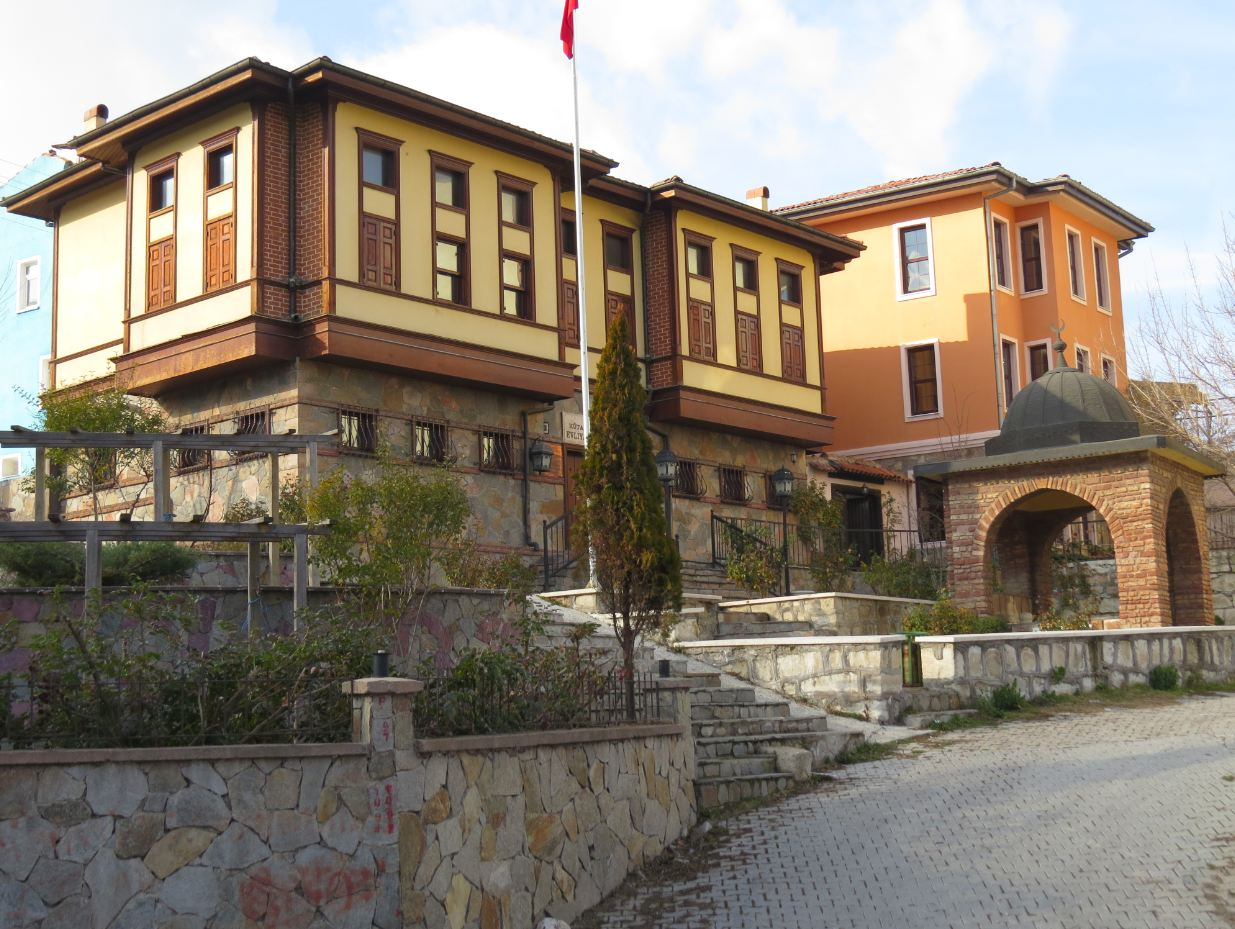
The house of Evliya Çelebi in Kütahya, now used as a museum

Evliya Çelebi was born in Constantinople in 1611 to a wealthy family from Kütahya. Both his parents were attached to the Ottoman court, his father, Dervish Mehmed Zilli, as a jeweller, and his mother as an Abkhazian relation of the Grand Vizier of Mehmed IV Melek Ahmed Pasha. In his book, Evliya Çelebi traces his paternal genealogy back to Ahmad Yasawi, the earliest known Turkic poet and an early Sufi mystic. Evliya Çelebi received a court education from the Imperial ulama (scholars). He may have joined the Gulshani Sufi order, as he shows an intimate knowledge of their khanqah in Cairo, and a graffito exists in which he referred to himself as Evliya-yı Gülşenî ("Evliya of the Gülşenî").

A devout Muslim opposed to fanaticism, Evliya could recite the Quran from memory. Though employed as a clergyman and entertainer at the Imperial Court of Sultan Murad IV, Evliya refused employment that would keep him from travelling. Çelebi had studied vocal and instrumental music as a pupil of a renowned Khalwati dervish by the name of 'Umar Gulshani, and his musical gifts earned him much favor at the Imperial Palace, impressing even the chief musician Amir Guna. He was also trained in the theory of music called ilm al-musiqi.

His journal-writing began in Constantinople, with the taking of notes on buildings, markets, customs, and culture, and in 1640 it was augmented with accounts of his travels beyond the confines of the city. The collected notes of his travels form a ten-volume work called the Seyahâtname ("Travelogue"). Departing from the Ottoman literary convention of the time, he wrote in a mixture of vernacular and high Turkish, with the effect that the Seyahatname has remained a popular and accessible reference work about life in the Ottoman Empire in the 17th century, including two chapters on musical instruments.

Evliya Çelebi died in 1684. It is unclear whether he was in Constantinople or Cairo at the time.

== Travels ==
=== Europe ===
Çelebi claimed to have encountered Native Americans as a guest in Rotterdam during his purported visit in 1663. He wrote: "[they] cursed those priests, saying, 'Our world used to be peaceful, but it has been filled by greedy people, who make war every year and shorten our lives.'"

While visiting Vienna in 1665–1666, Çelebi noted some similarities between words in German and Persian, an early observation of the relationship between what would later be known as two Indo-European languages.

Çelebi visited Crete and in book II described the fall of the Venetian-held fortified city of Chania during the 1645 siege of Chania; in book VIII he recounts the Candia campaign.

==== Croatia ====
During his travels in the Balkan regions of the Ottoman Empire Çelebi visited northern Dalmatia, parts of Slavonia, Međimurje, and Banija. He recorded a variety of historiographic and ethnographic sources. They included descriptions of first-hand encounters, third-party narrator witnesses, and invented elements.

==== Hungary ====
During the Ottoman campaign on the Habsburg frontier in 1663, Çelebi took part in raids in the Hungarian region in which people were captured and sold into slavery. In his Seyahatname, he described the capture and sale of Christian captives, sometimes in graphic detail.

==== Circassia ====
Çelebi traveled to Circassia as well, in 1640. He commented on the women's beauty and talked about the absence of mosques and bazaars despite being a Muslim country. He talks about the hospitality of Circassians and mentions that he could not write the Circassian language using letters, and compared the language to a "magpie shout".

==== Bosnia ====
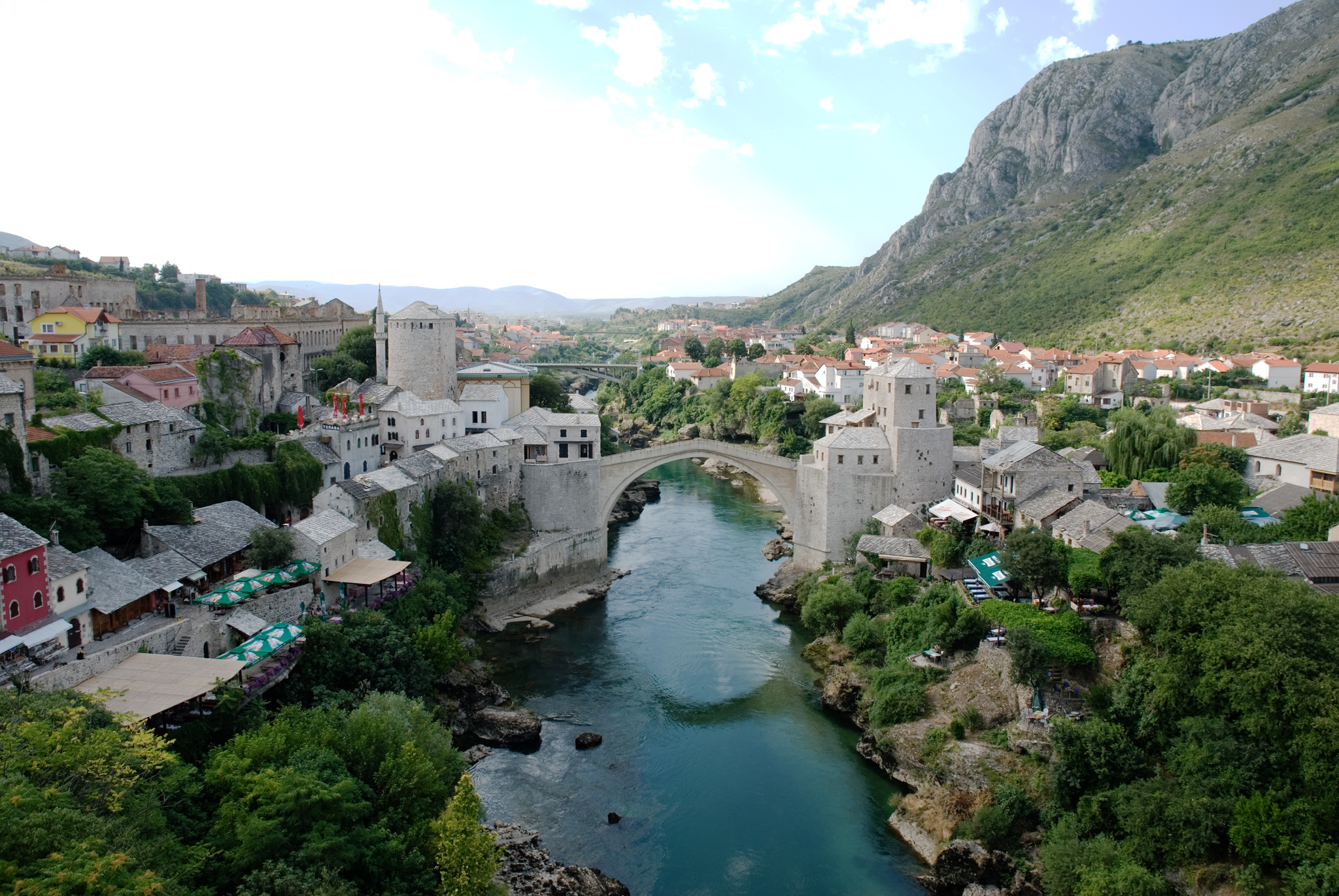
The Old Bridge in Mostar

Evliya Çelebi visited the town of Mostar, then in Ottoman Bosnia. He wrote that the name Mostar means "bridge-keeper", in reference to the town's celebrated bridge, 28 meters long and 20 meters high. Çelebi wrote that it "is like a rainbow arch soaring up to the skies, extending from one cliff to the other. ...I, a poor and miserable slave of Allah, have passed through 16 countries, but I have never seen such a high bridge. It is thrown from rock to rock as high as the sky."

==== Bulgaria (Dobruja) ====
Evliya Çelebi, who traveled around Anatolia and the Balkans in the 17th century, mentioned the northeast of Bulgaria as the Uz (Oğuz) region, and that a Turkish speaking Muslim society named Çıtak consisting of medium-sized, cheerful and strong people lived in Silistra, and also known as the "Dobruca Çitakları" in Dobruja. He also emphasizes that "Çıtaklar" is made up of a mixture of Tatars, Vlachs, and Bulgarians.

==== Kosovo ====
In 1660, Çelebi went to Kosovo and referred to the central part of the region as Arnavud (آرناوود) and noted that in Vushtrri its inhabitants were speakers of Albanian or Turkish and few spoke Bosnian. The highlands around the Tetovo, Peja, and Prizren areas Çelebi considered as being the "mountains of Arnavudluk". Çelebi referred to the "mountains of Peja" as being in Arnavudluk (آرناوودلق) and considered the Ibar river that converged in Mitrovica as forming Kosovo's border with Bosnia. He viewed the "Kılab" or Llapi river as having its source in Arnavudluk (Albania) and by extension the Sitnica as being part of that river. Çelebi also included the central mountains of Kosovo within Arnavudluk.

==== Albania ====
Çelebi traveled extensively throughout Albania, visiting it on 3 occasions. He visited Tirana, Lezha, Shkodra and Bushat in 1662, Delvina, Gjirokastra, Tepelena, Skrapar, Përmet, Berat, Kanina, Vlora, Bashtova, Durrës, Kavaja, Peqin, Elbasan, and Pogradec in 1670.

==== North Macedonia ====
Çelebi visited the area of modern North Macedonia. He wrote that the mosque in Ohrid, now named the Ali Pasha Mosque, had two minarets. If true, the second did not survive to be photographed in the 19th century.

==== Parthenon ====
In 1667, Çelebi expressed his marvel at the Parthenon's sculptures and described the building as "like some impregnable fortress not made by human agency." He composed a poetic supplication that the Parthenon, as "a work less of human hands than of Heaven itself, should remain standing for all time."

==== Shirvan ====
Of oil merchants in Baku Çelebi wrote: "By Allah's decree oil bubbles up out of the ground, but in the manner of hot springs, pools of water are formed with oil congealed on the surface like cream. Merchants wade into these pools and collect the oil in ladles and fill goatskins with it, these oil merchants then sell them in different regions. Revenues from this oil trade are delivered annually directly to the Safavid Shah."

==== Crimean Khanate ====
Evliya Çelebi remarked on the impact of Cossack raids from Azak upon the territories of the Crimean Khanate, destroying trade routes and severely depopulating the regions. By the time of Çelebi's arrival, many of the towns visited were affected by the Cossacks, and the only place in Crimea he reported as safe was the Ottoman fortress at Arabat.

Çelebi wrote of the slave trade in the Crimea:

A man who had not seen this market, had not seen anything in this world. A mother is severed from her son and daughter there, a son—from his father and brother, and they are sold amongst lamentations, cries of help, weeping and sorrow.

Çelebi estimated that there were about 400,000 slaves in the Crimea but only 187,000 free Muslims. Many of these slaves were captives taken during Crimean–Nogai slave raids and brought to the Crimean Peninsula to be sold in its slave markets.

=== Asia ===
==== Syria and Palestine ====
In contrast to many European and some Jewish travelogues of Palestine and Syria in the 17th century, Çelebi wrote one of the few detailed travelogues from an Islamic point of view. Çelebi visited Palestine twice, once in 1649 and once in 1670–1671. An English translation of the first part, with some passages from the second, was published in 1935–1940 by the self-taught Palestinian scholar Stephan Hanna Stephan who worked for the Palestine Department of Antiquities. Significant are the many references to Palestine, or "Land of Palestine", and Evliya notes, "All chronicles call this country Palestine." However, Sarah Irving cautions, "the borders of Stephan’s Palestine were largely meaningless to Evliya at a time when cities such as Acre, Jaffa and Nablus had closer and more significant relations with (respectively) Beirut, Sidon or Salt than with one another. In selecting the specific sections included in his translations, Stephan effectively creates a new text which accords with the Palestine of his own day." Çelebi says of the Sanjak of Safed that "All chronicles mention these places as Kan'an."

The work features some exaggerations: on Safed, he claims 70,000 Jews once lived there before migrating to Salonica, with only 2,000 remaining in his day. He explains the large numbers of Jews by saying the city was the original homeland of the Children of Israel, and compared it to their own ka'aba, apologizing: "saving the comparison!" He described Jerusalem as containing the shrines of 124,000 prophets, 240 prayer niches and 700 waqfs. Visiting the Church of the Holy Sepulchre, he found it beautiful but like a "tourist attraction", lacking spirituality, and praying in a corner that it would one day become a mosque. He also recorded shared worship of Jews, Muslims, Druze and Christians, including multi-religious celebrations at Meiron, Hebron's Cave of the Patriarchs, and the Tomb of Samuel.

==== Mecca ====
Evliya reported that the sheriffs of Mecca promoted trade in the region by encouraging fairs from the wealthy merchants. Evliya went on to explain that a large amount of buying and selling occurred in Mecca during the pilgrimage season.

== Seyahatnâme ==
He wrote one of history's longest and most ambitious accounts of travel writing in any language, the Seyahatnâme. Although many of the descriptions in the Seyahatnâme were written in an exaggerated manner or were plainly inventive fiction or third-source misinterpretation, his notes remain a useful guide to the culture and lifestyles of the 17th-century Ottoman Empire. The first volume deals exclusively with Constantinople, the final volume with Egypt.

Currently there is no English translation of the entire Seyahatnâme, although there are translations of various parts. The longest single English translation was published in 1834 by Joseph von Hammer-Purgstall, an Austrian orientalist: it may be found under the name "Evliya Efendi." Von Hammer-Purgstall's work covers the first two volumes (Constantinople and Anatolia) but its language is antiquated. Other translations include Erich Prokosch's nearly complete translation into German of the tenth volume, the 2004 introductory work entitled The World of Evliya Çelebi: An Ottoman Mentality written by Robert Dankoff, and Dankoff and Sooyong Kim's 2010 translation of select excerpts of the ten volumes, An Ottoman Traveller: Selections from the Book of Travels of Evliya Çelebi.

Evliya is noted for having collected samples of the languages in each region he traveled in. There are some 30 Turkic dialects and languages cataloged in the Seyahatnâme. Çelebi notes the similarities between several words from the German and Persian, though he denies any common Indo-European heritage. The Seyahatnâme also contains the first transcriptions of many languages of the Caucasus and Tsakonian, and the only extant specimens of written Ubykh outside the linguistic literature. He also wrote in detail about Arabian horses and their different strains.

In the 10 volumes of his Seyahatnâme, he describes the following journeys:

1. Constantinople and surrounding areas (1630)
2. Anatolia, the Caucasus, Crete, and Azerbaijan (1640)
3. Syria, Palestine, Armenia, and Rumelia (1648)
4. Kurdistan, Iraq, and Iran (1655)
5. Russia and the Balkans (1656)
6. Military Campaigns in Hungary during the fourth Austro-Turkish War (1663/64)
7. Austria, the Crimea, and the Caucasus for the second time (1664)
8. Greece and then the Crimea and Rumelia for the second time (1667–1670)
9. the Hajj to Mecca (1671)
10. Egypt, Eritrea, Ethiopia, Somalia, and the Sudan (1672–1675)

== Perceptions of ethnic and religious minorities ==
Çelebi encountered a wide range of ethnic and religious communities during his travels and has commonly been credited with being more objective toward them, but a 2019 study by Mustafa Çapar argues this reputation is only partially deserved; he identifies examples of what he describes as marginalizing, "otherizing" language, which he links to Çelebi's social position. Drawing on Suavi Aydın, Çapar presents Çelebi as combining an orientalist-style attitude toward the peoples of his own "Orient," particularly communities that had rejected Islam, with an occidentalist attitude toward Europe. Aydın has called Çelebi "the first occidentalist Turk." Arzu Erekli, also cited by Çapar, argues that Çelebi feminized and thereby marginalized the West, casting it as weak and female against a strong, male Orient. At the same time, Çapar notes, Çelebi admired and praised Western agricultural, medical, and technical developments, so that the West functioned for him as both a negative and a positive other. Nevertheless, Çapar notes, the negative and sometimes humiliating expressions do not devalue the work or diminish Çelebi's importance.

According to Çapar, the primary axis of Çelebi's judgements was religion. He categorized non-Muslims wholesale as infidels (kefere), sinners, and people without a legitimate sect; additionally, as noted earlier by Dankoff, he never completely shed ethnic stereotyping. While Çelebi elsewhere affirmed his own Turkish identity and revered Ahmet Yesevi, Anatolian peasant Turks and Turkmens are repeatedly described as rebellious, savage, and swindlers. Çelebi illustrated their alleged slyness with an anecdote about villagers near Bolu reselling the same waterlogged firewood to guests over decades. He also recorded Selim I's ordered massacre of 4,000 Qizilbash Turkmens in the Göksun upland in a manner Çapar sees as approving. Arabs ranked among the most distinguished peoples in his eyes, possibly because of their important role in Islam's emergence, yet Bedouin and village Arabs were condemned as faithless brigands and insects. Kurds received few negative labels (the insect epithet appearing only a few times) but were associated with stubbornness and theft, and were judged as good people only insofar as they were Shafi'i Muslims obeying Islamic law.

Greeks, Armenians, and Jews were routinely called infidels and sinners, though Çelebi sometimes noted their positive aspects. In war narratives, Çapar observes (following Dankoff) that Greek tactics were described with the vocabulary of treachery and deception, while Ottoman tactics received the vocabulary of heroism and honor; furthermore, Greek converts to Islam were said to have thereby become honorable. Çapar also notes that Çelebi both warned that Greek and other non-Muslim boys seduced men and dwelt on those boys' beauty, effectively turning them into sexual objects. Armenians were praised as necessary and professional workers, especially as they cleaned Istanbul's sewers, yet their "filth" was extended from the occupation to the ethnicity as a whole.

For Jews, Çelebi retold at length a Trabzon legend in which townspeople slaughtered the city's entire Jewish population (including women, children, and babies) after Muslim boys who had disappeared for two decades were found enslaved and mutilated in a tannery owned by Jews, presenting the tale, under the chapter title "A really nice story," as the reason no Jews lived in Trabzon. Hakan T. Karateke observes that while the story is not "technically a blood libel", as the boys were not taken for ritual use of their blood, "it is clearly a story in a similar vein". Çelebi also repeated claims that Jews had murdered prophets. He described Nebuchadnezzar massacring vast numbers of Jews as retribution for their killing of John the Baptist, quoting the king as declaring he had avenged John "from the Jewish people." He claims some 170,000 Jews were killed in Safed alone during this episode, and that the bloodstained rocks were still visible in his own day; he uses this story to explain the origins of Jewish communities in cities such as Isfahan and Salonica. In a related tale, he described the killing of John's father, Zechariah, by Jews, followed by a massive retaliatory slaughter of Jews in Aleppo by a Macedonian ruler, who then supposedly built what is now Aleppo's Great Mosque. Evliya also claimed that Jews killed most of the seventy prophets active in Tiberias and imprisoned forty more in a cave near Damascus, where they died of starvation. He added that Jews imprisoned Jesus for forty days in Nablus, and cited religious commentaries claiming thousands of the tradition's 124,000 prophets were martyred by Jews. Çelebi also attributed stereotyped physical traits such as foul breath and pale skin to their descent from a community resurrected through the prayer of the prophet Uzair. Nevertheless, he conceded that Egypt's Jewish moneychangers were exceptionally honest.

Although the Roma appear less frequently, they are stereotyped as thieves, liars, and quarrelsome. Çelebi invoked a Quranic passage (Hud 59) regarding Pharaoh's followers to argue that despite presenting themselves as Muslims, these groups were more despicable than non-believers. Furthermore, Çapar argues that Black Africans were judged in a manner resembling the racial classifications applied by certain Europeans to the indigenous peoples of the Americas and Australia. Desert communities along the Nile, as well as in Ethiopia and Sudan, are dehumanized as naked, animal-like and faithless; in contrast, more careful and even complimentary language is reserved chiefly for Muslim communities in Africa, such as the city of Sennar.

Non-orthodox Muslim groups receive even harsher treatment in the text. Çelebi denied the Muslim identity of the Qizilbash (Alevis and Shia of various ethnic origins), characterized the Ottoman forces who slaughtered them as martyrs forming the "Army of Islam," and approvingly cited doctrines stating that anyone who killed a Qizilbash would escape questioning or punishment. Yet, he adopted a more nuanced approach toward a rumor alleging ritual immorality among Alevis; he noted that he had never personally witnessed such behavior and attributed the slander to cruel gossips. The Alawites were subjected to similarly negative judgments, with Çelebi alleging secret sun-worship and seemingly incestuous practices. According to Çapar, the Yazidis are subjected to the harshest language. Çelebi traced their origins to Yazid I (the son of Mu'awiya I), holding them historically responsible for the martyrdom of Husayn ibn Ali at Karbala. He falsely accused them of worshipping dogs, goats, roosters, and the devil. Furthermore, he dehumanized the Yazidis of the Sinjar Mountains (the "Sincar Mountains hairy Kurds") as short, neckless, goblin-faced beings covered in hair and infested with parasites. He also attributed bizarre customs to Yazidi women, including year-long pregnancies, feeding newborns black dog's milk, and polyandrous marriage.

== In popular culture ==
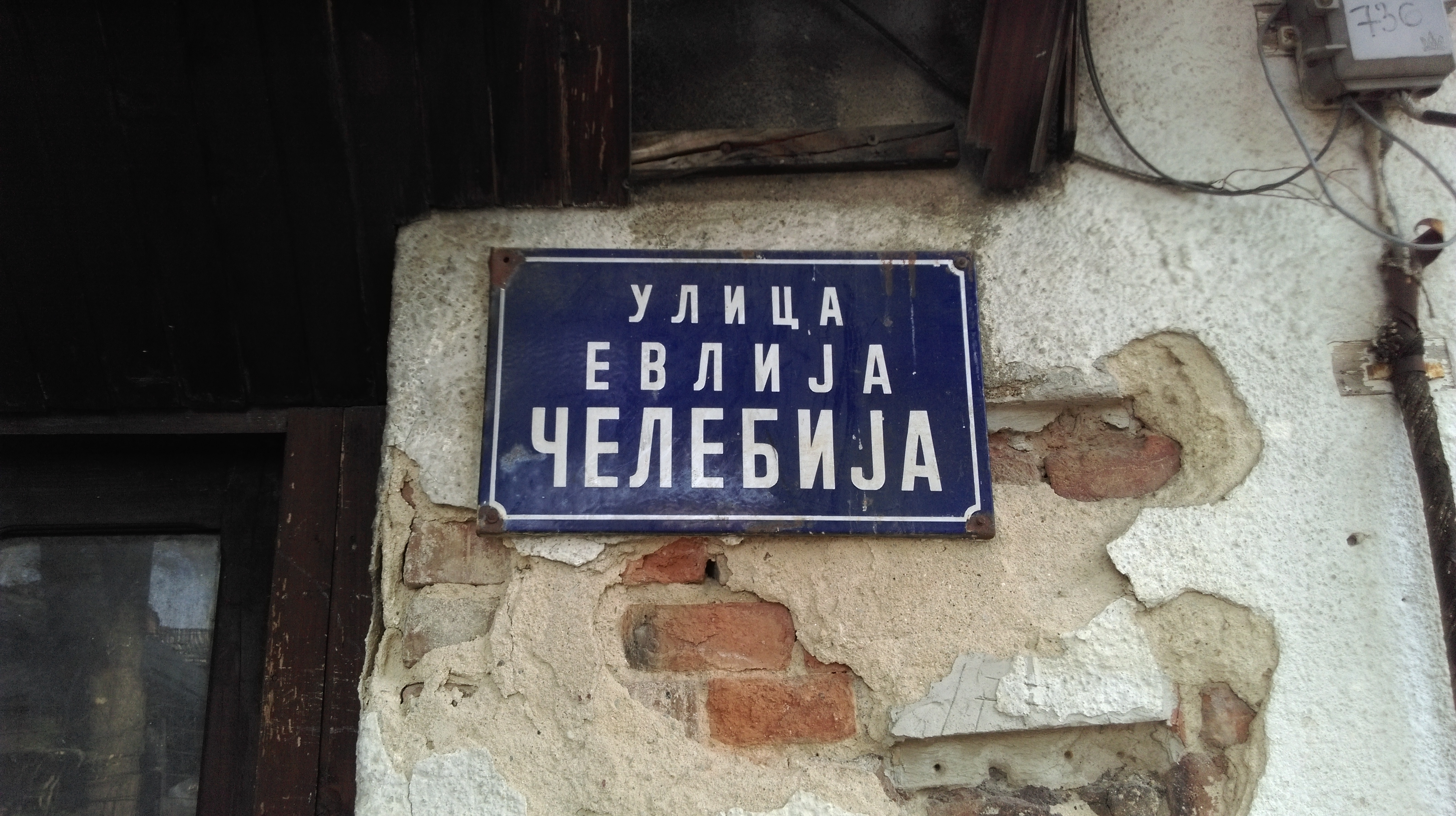
Evlija Čelebija (Evliya Çelebi) street in modern Skopje, North Macedonia

- Çelebi appears in Orhan Pamuk's 1985 novel The White Castle, and is featured in The Adventures of Captain Bathory (Dobrodružstvá kapitána Báthoryho) novels by Slovak writer Juraj Červenák.
- İstanbul Kanatlarımın Altında (Istanbul Under My Wings, 1996) is a film about the lives of legendary aviator brothers Hezârfen Ahmed Çelebi and Lagâri Hasan Çelebi, and the Ottoman society in the early 17th century, during the reign of Murad IV, as witnessed and narrated by Evliya Çelebi.
- Evliya Çelebi ve Ölümsüzlük Suyu (Evliya Çelebi and the Water of Life, 2014, dir. Serkan Zelzele), a children's adaptation of Çelebi's adventures, is the first full-length Turkish animated film.
- UNESCO included the 400th anniversary of Çelebi's birth in its timetable for the celebration of anniversaries.
- In the 2015 TV series Muhteşem Yüzyıl: Kösem, is portrayed by Turkish actor Necip Memili.

== Taxa named in his honor ==
- The Lycian spring minnow, Pseudophoxinus evliyai Freyhof & Özuluğ, 2010 is a species of ray-finned fish in the family Leuciscidae.

It is found in drainages in western Anatolia in Turkey.

== See also ==
- Ahmad ibn Fadlan
- Hezârfen Ahmed Çelebi
- Kâtip Çelebi
- Evliya Çelebi Way
- Turkish literature

== Sources and further reading ==
=== In Turkish ===
- Evliya Çelebi. Evliya Çelebi Seyahatnâmesi. Beyoğlu, İstanbul: Yapı Kredi Yayınları Ltd. Şti., 1996. 10 vols.
- Evliya Çelebi: Seyahatnamesi. 2 Vol. Cocuk Klasikleri Dizisi. Berlin 2005. ISBN 975-379-160-7 (A selection translated into modern Turkish for children)
- Robert Dankoff, Nuran Tezcan, Evliya Çelebi'nin Nil Haritası - Dürr-i bî misîl în ahbâr-ı Nîl, Yapı Kredi Yayınları 2011
- Nuran Tezcan, Semih Tezcan (Edit.), Doğumunun 400. Yılında Evliya Çelebi, T. C. Kültür ve Turizm Bakanlığı Yayınları, Ankara 2011

=== In English ===
- Çelebi, Evliya (1834). Narrative of Travels in Europe, Asia, and Africa, in the Seventeenth Century. Vol. 1. Translated by Joseph von Hammer-Purgstall. London: Oriental Translation Fund – via Open Library. (+ contents) + via HathiTrust
- Çelebi, Evliya (1834). Narrative of Travels in Europe, Asia, and Africa, in the Seventeenth Century. Vol. 2. Translated by Joseph von Hammer-Purgstall. London: Oriental Translation Fund – via Open Library. (+ contents)
- Çelebi, Evliya [1834]. Narrative of Travels in Europe, Asia, and Africa, in the Seventeenth Century (vol 1) at Project Gutenberg
- Narrative of travels in Europe, Asia, and Africa, in the seventeenth century, by Evliyá Efendí. Trans. Ritter Joseph von Hammer. London: Oriental Translation Fund of Great Britain and Ireland, 1846.
- Stephan, St. H. (1935). "Evliya Tshelebi's travels in Palestine". Quarterly of The Department of Antiquities in Palestine. 4. annotated by L. A. Mayer: 103-108.
- Stephan, St. H. (1935). "Evliya Tshelebi's travels in Palestine II". Quarterly of The Department of Antiquities in Palestine. 4. Annotated by L. A. Mayer: 154–162.
- Stephan, St. H. (1935). "Evliya Tshelebi's travels in Palestine III". Quarterly of The Department of Antiquities in Palestine. 5. Annotated by L. A. Mayer: 69–73.
- Stephan, St. H. (1936). "Evliya Tshelebi's travels in Palestine IV". Quarterly of The Department of Antiquities in Palestine. 6 (2). Annotated by L. A. Mayer: 84–97.
- Stephan, St. H. (1938). "Evliya Tshelebi's travels in Palestine V". Quarterly of The Department of Antiquities in Palestine. 8 (2). Annotated by L. A. Mayer: 137-156.
- Evliya Çelebi in Diyarbekir: The Relevant Section of The Seyahatname. Trans. and Ed. Martin van Bruinessen and Hendrik Boeschoten. New York : E.J. Brill, 1988.
- The Intimate Life of an Ottoman Statesman: Melek Ahmed Pasha (1588–1662) as Portrayed in Evliya Çelebi's Book of Travels. Albany: State University of New York Press, 1991.
- Evliya Çelebi's Book of Travels. Evliya Çelebi in Albania and Adjacent Regions (Kosovo, Montenegro). The Relevant Sections of the Seyahatname. Trans. and Ed. Robert Dankoff. Leiden and Boston 2000. ISBN 90-04-11624-9
- Robert Dankoff: An Ottoman Mentality. The World of Evliya Çelebi. Leiden: E. J. Brill, 2004.
- Klaus Kreiser, "Evliya Çelebi", eds. C. Kafadar, H. Karateke, C. Fleischer. October 2005.
- Evliya Çelebi: Selected Stories by Evliya Çelebi, edited by Zeynep Üstün, translated by Havva Aslan, Profil Yayıncılık, Istanbul 2007 ISBN 978-975-996-072-8
- An Ottoman Traveller: Selections from the Book of Travels of Evliya Çelebi. Trans. and Ed. Robert Dankoff and Sooyong Kim. Eland Publishing, 2011. ISBN 1906011583
- Winter, Michael (2017). "The Conquest of Syria and Egypt by Sultan Selim I, according to Evliyâ Çelebi". In Conermann, Stephan; Sen, Gül (eds.). The Mamlik-Ottoman Transition. Bonn University Press.
- Fotić, Aleksandar (2021). "Receptions of Evliya Çelebi's Seyahatname in Serbian Historiography and Challenges of the Original Manuscript". Evliya Çelebi in the Borderlands: New Insights and Novel Approaches to the Seyahatname. Zagreb: Srednja Europa. pp. 149–163.

=== In German ===
- Helena Turková: Die Reisen und Streifzüge Evliyâ Çelebîs in Dalmatien und Bosnien in den Jahren 1659/61. Prag 1965.
- Klaus Kreiser: Edirne im 17. Jahrhundert nach Evliyâ Çelebî. Ein Beitrag zur Kenntnis der osmanischen Stadt. Freiburg 1975. ISBN 3-87997-045-9
- Im Reiche des Goldenen Apfels. Des türkischen Weltenbummlers Evliâ Çelebis denkwürdige Reise in das Giaurenland und die Stadt und Festung Wien anno 1665. Trans. R. Kreutel, Graz, et al. 1987.
- Ins Land der geheimnisvollen Func: des türkischen Weltenbummlers, Evliyā Çelebi, Reise durch Oberägypten und den Sudan nebst der osmanischen Provinz Habes in den Jahren 1672/73. Trans. Erich Prokosch. Graz: Styria, 1994.
- Evliyā Çelebis Anatolienreise aus dem dritten Band des Seyāḥatnāme. Trans. Korkut M. Buğday. New York: E. J. Brill, 1996.
- Evliya Çelebis Reise von Bitlis nach Van: ein Auszug aus dem Seyahatname. Trans. Christiane Bulut. Wiesbaden: Harrassowitz, 1997.
- Manisa nach Evliyā Çelebi: aus dem neunten Band des Seyāḥat-nāme. Trans. Nuran Tezcan. Boston: Brill, 1999.
- Kairo in der zweiten Hälfte des 17. Jahrhunderts. Beschrieben von Evliya Çelebi. Trans. Erich Prokosch. Istanbul 2000. ISBN 975-7172-35-9
