= Dimitri Baramki =

Palestinian archaeologist (1909–1984)

Dimitri Constantine Baramki
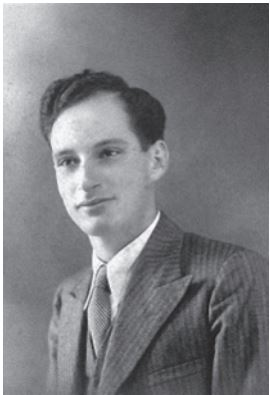

Chief Archaeologist at the Department of Antiquities of the Government of Mandatory Palestine
- In office 1938–1948
- Preceded by: Robert Hamilton

Personal details
- Born: 1909 Jerusalem, Sanjak of Jerusalem, Ottoman Empire
- Died: 1984 (aged 74–75) California, United States
- Education: University of London
- Occupation: Curator of the Archaeological Museum at the American University of Beirut
- Profession: Archaeologist, Professor
- Known for: Excavations at Hisham's Palace, the discovery of the Shalom Al Yisrael Synagogue

Dimitri Constantine Baramki, often styled D. C. Baramki (1909, Jerusalem, Sanjak of Jerusalem – 1984, California, United States), was a Palestinian archaeologist who served as chief archaeologist at the Department of Antiquities of the Government of Mandatory Palestine from 1938 to 1948. From 1952 until his retirement, he was the curator of the Archaeological Museum at the American University of Beirut, Lebanon, where he served as a professor of archaeology.

== Biography ==
Dimitri Baramki was born in Jerusalem, then in the Ottoman Empire's Mutasarrifate of Jerusalem, to a Palestinian Christian family. He studied at St. George's School, Jerusalem. He was appointed Student Inspector, Special Grade, in the Department of Antiquities of the British Mandate government from September 1927. At the beginning of 1929 he was promoted to Inspector. In 1934, he completed his academic studies at the University of London. From 1938 to 1948 he served as chief antiquities inspector in place of Robert Hamilton, who was appointed director of the department. In 1945 he was appointed Senior Archaeological officer.

During his years in Palestine, Baramki published many articles, mainly in the Quarterly of the Department of Antiquities in Palestine (QDAP) journal, on various sites - from the Bronze Age tombs to Byzantine churches.

In 1937, Baramki was the first person to identify the Ayyubid text in the village mosque of Farkha, dating to 606/1210.

From 1934 to 1948 he conducted excavations and investigations at Hisham's Palace in Jericho. Baramki found the graffiti that mentions Hisham ibn Abd al-Malik and accordingly dated the construction of the palace (a statement that was later rejected) to the years of his rule (724–743), contemporary to Qasr al-Hayr al-Gharbi in Syria.

Baramki's doctoral thesis, submitted in 1953 to the University of London, dealt with Umayyad architecture and relied on the findings of his excavations at Hisham's Palace.

As part of his work in the Jericho area, Baramki discovered the Shalom Al Yisrael Synagogue in 1936.

At the end of the British Mandate in May 1948 (during the Nakba and the partition), Dimitri Baramki led Jerusalem's Rockefeller Museum for a short time.

There was talk of being appointed head of the Department of Antiquities of the West Bank on behalf of the Jordanian government, but he chose to work at the American School of Oriental Studies in Jerusalem as a consultant and librarian. In 1950 and 1951 he continued excavations in the Jericho area in cooperation with the American archaeologist James Leon Kelso, prior to the 1967 Israeli occupation.

In 1952, Baramki was invited to serve as curator of the Archaeological Museum at the American University of Beirut, Lebanon, where he taught until his retirement in 1975.

== Published works ==
=== Books ===
- The Road to Petra : A Short Guide to East Jordan (Amman, 1947)
- "Arab culture and architecture of the Umayyad Period : a comparative study with special reference to the results of the excavations of Hisham's palace" (PhD dissertation, 1953. unpublished)
- Phoenicia and the Phoenicians (Beirut, 1961)
- The Archaeological Museum of the American University of Beirut (Beirut, 1967)
- The Coins Exhibited in the Archaeological Museum of the American University of Beirut (Beirut, 1968)
- The Art and Architecture of Ancient Palestine: A Survey of the Archaeology of Palestine from the Earliest Times to the Ottoman Conquest (Beirut, PLO Research Center, 1969)
- The Coin Collection of the American University of Beirut Museum (Beirut, 1974)

=== Articles ===
- Baramki, D.C. (1933). "A Byzantine Bath at Qalandia". Quarterly of the Department of Antiquities in Palestine. 2: 105–109.
- Baramki, D.C.; Avi-Yonah, M. (1934). "An early Christian Church at Khirbat 'Asida". Quarterly of the Department of Antiquities in Palestine. 3: 17–19.
- Baramki, D.C. (1934). "An early Christian Basilica at 'Ain Hanniya". Quarterly of the Department of Antiquities in Palestine. 3: 113–117.
- Baramki, D.; Stephan, St. H. (1935). "A Nestorian hermitage between Jericho and the Jordan". Quarterly of the Department of Antiquities in Palestine. 4: 81-86.
- Baramki, D. C. (1935). "An early Iron Age Tomb at Ez Zahiriyye". Quarterly of the Department of Antiquities in Palestine. 4: 109–110.
- Baramki, D.C. (1935). "Recent Discoveries of Byzantine Remains in Palestine. A Mosaic Pavement at Beit Nattif". Quarterly of the Department of Antiquities in Palestine. 4: 119–121.
- Baramki, D.C. (1936). "Two Roman Cisterns at Beit Nattif". Quarterly of the Department of Antiquities in Palestine. 5: 3–10.

== Bibliography ==
- Helga Seeden, "Baramki, Dimitri Constantine". The Oxford Encyclopedia of Archaeology in the Near East, Vol. 1, 2009
- Dimitri C. Baramki 1909–1984, This Week In Palestine 178 Archived 2016-11-05 at the Wayback Machine, February 2013
- Sharon, M. (2004). Corpus Inscriptionum Arabicarum Palaestinae, D-F. Vol. 3. BRILL. ISBN 90-04-13197-3.
- Sharon, M. (2005). "Vassal and fasal: the evidence of the Farkhah inscription from 606/1210". Crusades. 22: 127–140.
- Whitcomb, Donald (2014). "Dimitri Baramki: Discovering Qasr Hisham". Jerusalem Quarterly: 78–82. doi:10.70190/jq.I55.p78.
- Donald Whitcomb and Hamdan Taha, Khirbat al-Mafjar and Its Place in the Archaeological Heritage of Palestine, Journal of Eastern Mediterranean Archaeology & Heritage Studies, Vol. 1, No. 1 (2013), pp. 54–65; also at academia.edu
