= The Palestine Oriental Society =

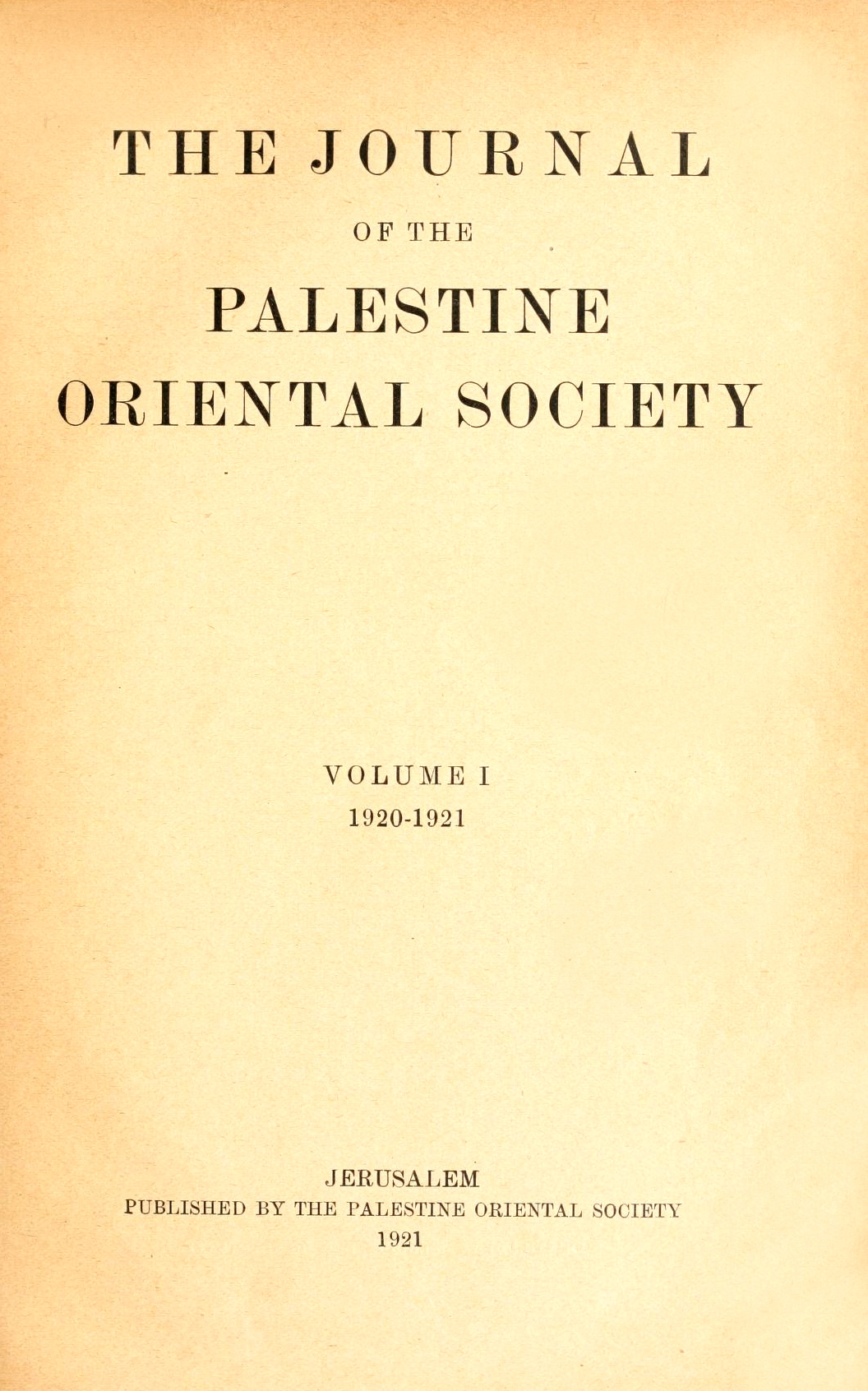
- Volume 1 of The Journal of the Palestine Oriental Society (1921)
- Formation: 1920
- Founder: Albert T. Clay
- Founded at: Jerusalem
- President: Père Lagrange (founding)
- Main organ: The Journal of the Palestine Oriental Society

The Palestine Oriental Society was a society for the "cultivation and publication of researches on the ancient Orient", founded on the initiative of Albert T. Clay in Jerusalem in 1920. It was established at a time when control of Palestine had recently passed from the Ottoman Empire to the British following the end of the First World War, and when archaeology was being professionalised and modernised.

It published The Journal of the Palestine Oriental Society (JPOS) from 1920 until 1948, pausing only during several years of the Second World War.

== Origins ==
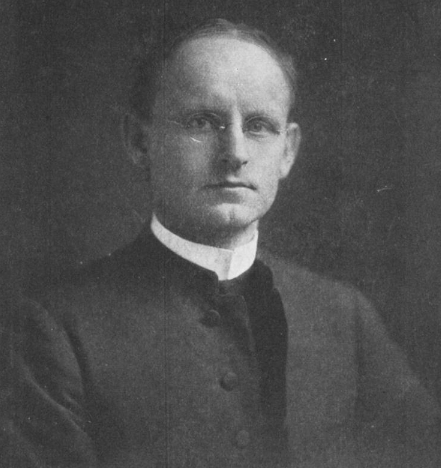
Albert T. Clay, founder of the Society

The society was the idea of the Yale University Assyriologist Albert T. Clay who was spending a year in Palestine as the annual professor of the American school of archaeological research in Palestine. He modelled it on the American Oriental Society which had been founded in 1842.

A preliminary meeting was held on 9 January 1920 at which a number of eminent academic, political, and military figures were present, and a constitution adopted which included a statement that the object of the society be the "cultivation and publication of researches on the ancient Orient".

The first general meeting of the society was held at Jerusalem on 22 March 1920 at which the papers read included: "Influence of topography in the Psalms" by John Punnett Peters; "A Palestinian Hebrew Inscription" by Nahum Slouschz; "Some fresh meanings for Hebrew roots" by David Yellin; "Noun classes and polarity in Hamitic, and their bearing upon the origin of the Semites" by William H. Worrell; and "The Bethlehem Mosaics" by Timotheos Themelis. After the first year it had 150 members.

Though Palestinian Arabs were absent from its inaugural meeting, the first journal published by the Society did include articles from local Palestinian scholars like Tawfiq Canaan and Stephan Hanna Stephan. Canaan also went on to sit on the Society's Board of Directors until 1948, and other prominent Arab scholars like George Antonious sat on its central committee. This inclusion of local and regional scholars made it rather unique among Mandate era societies in Jerusalem.

== Officers and patrons ==
The first president was Père Lagrange, who was succeeded by professor John Garstang. The first patrons were the soldier Viscount Allenby who had captured Jerusalem for the British in 1917, and the first High Commissioner for Palestine, Sir Herbert Samuel.

== Activities ==
The creation of the society coincided with a change of government in Palestine after the Ottoman Empire lost control of the Holy Land to the British following the end of the First World War, ushering in what the founders of the society hoped would be a new era of archaeological research under a more "enlightened" administration than had been the case under the Turks when researchers had "laboured under many and tiresome disabilities".

It also coincided with a modernisation and professionalisation of archaeological methods and the creation of new institutions to support the archaeological community in Palestine such as the Department of Antiquities and the Archaeological Advisory Board created by the new British government. In his review of "The Year's Work", and in accepting the position of second president of the society, John Garstang, Director of Antiquities of the Government of Palestine, expressed the hope that the society would become for Palestine the equivalent of the British Academy in London and the Académie in Paris. He also outlined the basis on which he expected archaeology to be practised in Palestine, starting with the paramount principle that the "monuments and antiquities of Palestine belong to Palestine and to Palestinians." He further stated that:

The days are over when the individual could be allowed to turn over ancient sites in search of antiquities for their own sake alone. The results of an excavation are to be judged not alone by the objects discovered, but more by the information as to the circumstances of discovery to be gleaned only by most patient method. The relation of an object to its surroundings is of far greater importance to history than the object itself.

Further measures included the limiting of permits to excavate to those sponsored by archaeological organisations, the creation of a register of historical sites and laws to preserve them, an inventory of dealers' and collectors' stocks of antiquities, the creation of a museum, and a programme of conservation and repairs.

== Journal ==
The society published The Journal of the Palestine Oriental Society (JPOS) from October 1920 with the first bound volume appearing in 1921. Articles were in English, French, and German. It was not issued for several years during the Second World War, and having resumed, ceased permanently with volume 21 in 1948.

- 1-21 Index
- Volume 1, 1920–1921.
- Volume 2, 1922.
- Volume 3, 1923.
- Volume 4, 1924.
- Volume 5, 1925.
- Volume 6, 1926
- Volume 7, 1927
- Volume 8, 1928
- Volume 9, 1929
- Volume 10, 1930
- Volume 11, 1931
- Volume 12, 1932
- Volume 13, 1933
- Volume 14, 1934
- Volume 15, 1935
- Volume 16, 1936
- Volume 17, 1937
- Volume 18, 1938
- Volume 19, 1939
- Volume 20 Iss1, 1946
- Volume 21, 1948

== See also ==
- Palestine Exploration Fund
