= Jerome Murphy-O'Connor =

Irish Roman Catholic priest (1935–2013)

- Born: 10 April 1935; Cork, Ireland
- Died: 11 November 2013 (aged 78); Jerusalem, Israel
- Education: University of Heidelberg

Jerome Murphy-O'Connor OP (10 April 1935 – 11 November 2013) was an Irish Dominican priest, a leading authority on St. Paul, and a Professor of New Testament at the École Biblique in Jerusalem, a position that he held from 1967 until his death.

== Biography ==
He was born James Murphy-O'Connor in 1935 to Kerry and Mary (née McCrohan) Murphy-O'Connor, the eldest of four siblings. A cousin was Cardinal Cormac Murphy-O'Connor, the 10th Archbishop of Westminster.

Murphy-O'Connor attended the Christian Brothers College, Cork, and later the Vincentian Castleknock College in Dublin, where he decided to become a Dominican priest. He entered the Dominican novitiate in St. Mary's Dominican Church and Priory, Cork in September 1953, giving up his baptismal name to take a new name in religion, "Jerome". After the novitiate he studied philosophy for a year before studying at The Priory Institute in Tallaght and at the University of Fribourg in Switzerland. He was ordained as a priest in July 1960. In Fribourg his first serious study as a lecturer was on the theme of preaching in Saint Paul, which was later developed into a doctoral thesis. He received his doctorate in 1962.

== École Biblique ==
In 1963 he studied in Rome, and researched the Dead Sea Scrolls at the University of Heidelberg, and New Testament theology at the University of Tübingen. From there he went to Jerusalem to the École Biblique, which was to become his religious, scholarly, and personal home. The École Biblique, founded in 1890 by French Dominican scholars, is an internationally renowned centre for Biblical studies and Biblical archaeology. He remained there for the rest of his life, having been appointed Professor of New Testament in 1967. He received honorary degrees in the US and Australia, and particularly treasured the doctorate of literature conferred in 2002 by the National University of Ireland in University College Cork.

Oxford University Press invited him to write an archaeological guide to the Holy Land which was first published in 1980. This was translated into several languages, with a fifth edition in 2008, and it has become the standard guide book. Murphy-O'Connor lectured around the world; he also made numerous television appearances, including in Le Mystère Paul (2000), Jesus: The Complete Story (2001), The Search for John the Baptist (2005), Christianity: A History for Channel 4 (2009), and "David Suchet: In the Footsteps of St Paul (TV documentary, 2012)".

He was also interviewed for the docudrama The Lost Tomb of Jesus, although he later stated that he was misquoted and misrepresented by the filmmakers, stressing that he did not believe there was any truth in the movie's claims, which he dismissed as "a commercial ploy".

== Views ==
Murphy-O'Connor was considered a leading scholar on Paul the Apostle, on whom he authored several major works, both for scholarly and lay audience. In them, he tried to reconstruct the life and theology of the Apostles, mainly relying on his epistles, while avoiding the use of the Acts of the Apostles, unless necessary; he also consistently defended the authenticity of the Second Epistle to the Thessalonians, the Epistle to the Colossians and the Second Epistle to Timothy.

== Selected works ==
Murphy-O'Connor authored many research articles and reviews, often in Revue Biblique. In addition, he authored or co-authored the books listed below.

- Murphy-O'Connor, Jerome (1964). Paul on Preaching. Stag books. New York: Sheed and Ward. OCLC 3062409.
- ——— (1968). Colossians. Milwaukee, WI: Bruce Pub. Co. OCLC 612622077.
- ——— (1968). Paul and Qumran: Studies in New Testament Exegesis. Chicago, IL: Priory Press. OCLC 729301519.
- ———; Bright, Laurence; Wansbrough, Henry (1971). Paul (volume1). Scripture discussion commentary. Vol. 10. London: Sheed & Ward. ISBN 9780722072080. OCLC 464121419.
- ———; Bright, Laurence; Wansbrough, Henry (1972). Paul (volume 2). Scripture discussion commentary. Vol. 11. London: Sheed & Ward. ISBN 9780722006719. OCLC 464121419.
- ——— (1977). Becoming Human Together: The Pastoral Anthropology of St. Paul. Wilmington, DE: M. Glazier. ISBN 9780894530753. OCLC 3878475.
- ——— (1979). 1 Corinthians. New Testament Message. Vol. 10. Wilmington, DE: M. Glazier. ISBN 9780894531330. OCLC 6021441.
- ——— (1980). The Holy Land: An Oxford Archaeological Guide from Earliest Times to 1700. Oxford archaeological guides. Oxford University Press. ISBN 9780192850881. OCLC 908913441.
- ———; Charlesworth, James H.; Benoit, Pierre (1990). Paul and the Dead Sea Scrolls. Christian origins library. New York: Crossroad Publishing Company. ISBN 9780824510008. OCLC 20796622.
- ———; Dunn, James D. G. (1991). The Theology of the Second Letter to the Corinthians. New Testament theology. Cambridge & New York: Cambridge University Press. ISBN 9780521353793. OCLC 22111724.
- ——— (1995). Paul the Letter-Writer: His World, His Options, His Skills. Good news studies. Vol. 41. Collegeville, MI: Liturgical Press. ISBN 9780814658451. OCLC 30436613.
- ——— (1997). Paul: A Critical Life. Oxford University Press. ISBN 9780192853424. OCLC 757402100.
- ——— (2002). St. Paul's Corinth: Texts and Archaeology. Good news studies. Vol. 6. Collegeville, MI: Liturgical Press. ISBN 9780814653036. OCLC 50243118.
- ——— (2004). Paul: His Story. Oxford University Press. ISBN 9780199266531. OCLC 54930368.
- ——— (2007). Jesus and Paul: Parallel Lives. Collegeville, MI: Liturgical Press. ISBN 9780814651735. OCLC 71552200.
