= Jericho synagogue =

Ancient former synagogue in Jericho, West Bank, Palestine

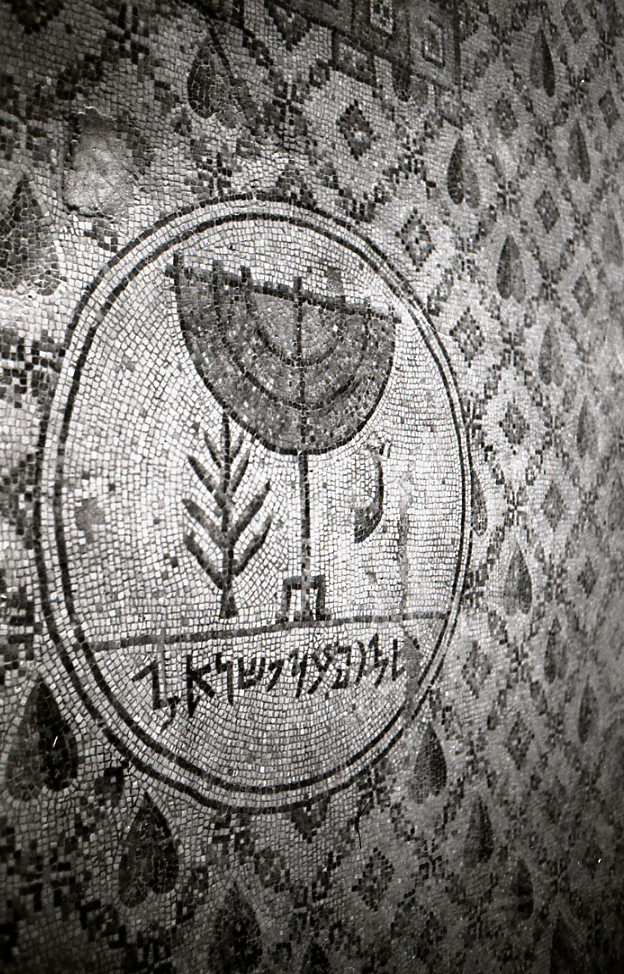
- The "Peace on Israel" floor mosaic of the Jericho synagogue

- Location of the former ancient synagogue in the West Bank

Religion
- Affiliation: Judaism
- Ecclesiastical or organisational status: Ancient synagogue; Archaeological site
- Status: Active

Location
- Location: Jericho, West Bank
- Country: Palestine
- Coordinates: 31°52′27″N 35°26′57″E

Architecture
- Style: Byzantine architecture
- Established: 6th century
- Shalom Al Israel Synagogue
- Periods: Byzantine / Talmudic

Site notes
- Excavation dates: 1936
- Archaeologists: Dimitri Baramki
- Condition: Preserved
- Owner: Husni Shahwan
- Public access: Restricted

The Jericho synagogue is a Jewish synagogue in Jericho, West Bank, Palestine. The synagogue was built in the Byzantine Empire-era and is believed to date from the late 6th or early 7th century CE and was discovered in 1936. All that remains from the ancient prayer house is its mosaic floor, which contains an Aramaic inscription presenting thanks to the synagogue donors, and a well-preserved central medallion with the inscription "Shalom al Israel", meaning "Peace [up]on Israel". This led to the site also being known as Shalom Al Israel Synagogue.

The former ancient synagogue was restored as a place of Jewish worship in the early part of the twenty-first century.

== History and description ==
=== Discovery ===
The synagogue, dating from the Byzantine period, was revealed in excavations conducted in 1936 by Dimitri Baramki of the Department of Antiquities under the British Mandate.

The well-off Arab Jerusalemite, Husni Shahwan, who owned the land, built a house on top of the mosaic, careful to preserve it.

=== Description ===
The mosaic floor incorporates Jewish symbols such as the Ark of the Covenant, the Temple Menorah, a shofar and a lulav. There is also a Hebrew inscription, "Peace [up]on Israel" (שלום על ישראל), after which the mosaic was named. The phrase "Peace on Israel" has been widely used on Jewish and sometimes Samaritan synagogue floors from the Byzantine and, in one known case, Early Muslim period.

=== 1967–1995 ===
After the 1967 Six-Day War, the site came under Israeli military control and remained under the responsibility of the owners, the Shahwan family. Tourists began visiting the site, as did religious Jews who came regularly for prayers. In the months after the war, Moshe Dayan thanked Mohammed, the son of Husni Shahwan, for the way the family had managed to protect the synagogue remains, which counted among the better preserved in the country. Mohammed Shahwan, who had just lost the bank he had owned due to the war, placed a guard over the mosaic floor and started charging a modest admission fee from visitors for the years until 1987, when the First Intifada broke out and the Israeli authorities confiscated the mosaic, the house and a small part of the farm around it. They offered compensation to the Shahwan family, but that was rejected.

=== After the 1995 Oslo Accords ===
After the 1995 Oslo Accords, control of the site was given to the Palestinian Authority (PA). It was agreed that free access to the site would continue and it would be adequately protected. The PA has deployed a special security force to protect it.

At the beginning of the Second Intifada the site became a source of conflict. On the night of 12 October 2000, vandals entered and desecrated the building, damaging the house on top of the ancient mosaic. The Torah scroll stored at the synagogue was rescued from the fire which had been started and was taken to Mevo'ot Yericho.

In 2005, the synagogue was open to visits, including by Israeli Jews, after the synagogue was restored by the Municipality of Jericho. Such visits, coordinated between the local Palestinian authorities and the Israel Defense Forces, were initially allowed once every month, in order to conduct prayer services.

Since July 2007, Jewish prayer services in the Jericho synagogue have been allowed once every week.

== See also ==
- Ancient synagogues in Palestine
- History of the Jews in Palestine
- List of oldest synagogues
