= Stephan Hanna Stephan =

Palestinian writer and radio broadcaster (1894–1949)

- ستيفان هانا ستيفان
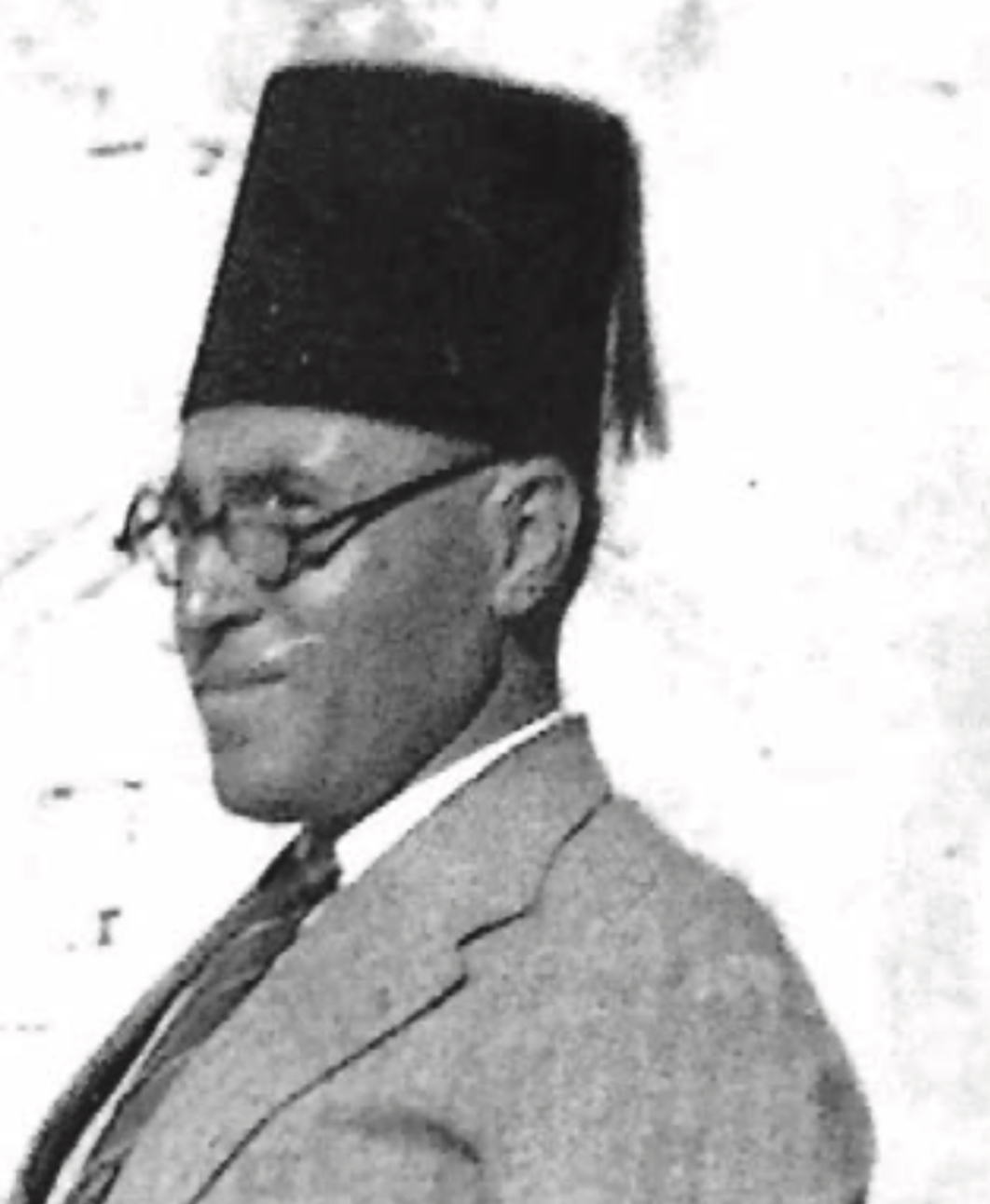
- Born: 1894; Beit Jala
- Died: 1949 (aged 54–55); Lebanon
- Known for: Writer and broadcaster of Palestinian history and folklore

Stephan Hanna Stephan (Arabic: ستيفان هانا ستيفان; 1894–1949), also St H Stephan, was a Palestinian writer, translator and radio broadcaster of history and folklore in Palestine. Besides publishing original articles, travel guides and phrasebooks in English and German, and broadcasting in Arabic, Stephan also produced several translations of books and inscriptions, utilizing his fluency in all these languages, as well as Ottoman Turkish and Syriac. Educated at the Schneller School, a German Protestant orphanage that operated in Jerusalem, he worked for the Mandatory Palestine authorities, first in the Treasury, and then in the Department of Antiquities.

== Early life ==
Stephan was born in Beit Jala in 1894, during the rule of the Ottoman Empire in Palestine. His family was part of the Syriac Orthodox Christian community there, but he studied at the Lutheran Schneller School in Lifta, Jerusalem, where he was baptized/confirmed by the school founder's son, Theodor Schneller, in 1908. Little is securely known of his early life, but it is believed he served in the Ottoman army in some capacity in World War I, based on his mention of having heard Kurdish folk songs while in Manbij and Jarabulus in his 1922 article on Palestinian folk songs.

== Career ==
=== Songs of songs ===
One of the earliest of Stephan's works, "The Palestinian Parallels to the Song of Songs" (1922) documented lyrics of folk songs in Palestine and compared them to biblical, Mesopotamian and Canaanite precursors. It was featured in The Journal of the Palestine Oriental Society (JPOS), and the biblical scholar and philologist William Foxwell Albright called Stephan "a young man of promise". Stephan was part of an informal school of "nativist" ethnographers, most prominent among them Tawfiq Canaan, who published their works at JPOS. The research and contributions of these mostly Jerusalemite Palestinians was motivated by their belief that the "native culture of Palestine", best represented in the ancient "living heritage" and traditions of the fellaheen, had to be urgently documented in the face of encroaching "colonialism and modernity".

In this ethnographic work, Stephan collected and transcribed thirty-two pages of every day Palestinian folk songs centering around themes of love, and the beauty of the beloved, in the colloquial Palestinian Arabic dialect. The next fifty-three pages transcribe the songs in romanized transliteration and English translation with annotations. It is in this section that the colloquial pronunciation is most faithfully recorded (e.g. dropping the 'qaf', such that قامت becomes 'amat). In the final twenty-five pages, Stephan reviews the selected folk songs, comparing them to the main themes and motifs of "the Canticles" (the Song of Songs), as well as to Arabic literature and poetry.

In January 1922, Stephan wrote another significant early piece in Arabic that was focused on a very different audience and subject. Mara'a ("Woman"), published by Cairo-based Sarkis magazine, named after the Lebanese family who founded it, was addressed to the Arab world and a contribution to the debates generated by the Nahda, where Stephan argued for gender equality as a means to national development in all fields.

=== Translations ===
While working at the Department of Antiquities, he co-authored papers with Dimitri Baramki and published other articles and translations of Ottoman documents and inscriptions from Jerusalem in their Quarterly. The American Journal of Archaeology noted his work translating Mamluk and Ottoman documents in 1934 as an important contribution. The biases of the colonial administration against advancing the situation of Palestinian Arab scholars likely hindered his advancement. His signing of articles under the European sounding name of "St H Stephan" may have been a deliberate reaction to those circumstances, and is the source of misattributions of some his works to other authors.

In 1934–1935, Stephan used his translation skills to compose a basic Arabic language guide for the Palestinian dialect, Arabic Self-Taught: A Primer; first in German and then in English. The guides were published by Steimatsky bookstore at the Syrian Orphanage, and the English introduction indicated that French and Hebrew editions were forthcoming, though it seems they never materialized. Albright gave input to its composition, and the vocabulary included indicates it was aimed at visiting archaeological students, as well as foreign officials, tourists, and merchants.

From the 17th-century ten-volume Ottoman travelogue of the Seyahatname (Book of Travels) by Evliya Çelebi, Stephan translated the rare Palestine section. This was published in six parts from 1935 to 1942 in The Quarterly of the Department of Antiquities, as "Evliya Tshelebi's Travels in Palestine (1648–50)". Leo Aryeh Mayer, his colleague at the department, also contributed annotations and translations for the first four parts, though Stephan completed the translation of the last two sections alone. Irving suggests that perhaps the 1936 revolt made collaboration with Mayer, a Zionist, increasingly untenable for Stephan.

Stephan engaged in many other collaborations and correspondences with Palestinian, Arab and European writers. In correspondences with Hilma Granqvist, there is familiarity and respect expressed, passing on greetings from 'Sitt Louisa' (Louise Baldensperger, 1862–1938), and offering critiques of Arabic translations and transliterations in Granqvist's work. In a letter from 1932, he describes Granqvist's work as an "important work on Palestine", implying the importance of both Palestine and ethnography to himself.

=== Radio & museum work ===
Beginning in 1936, Stephan was also a broadcaster for the Palestine Broadcasting Service, Mandatory Palestine's government owned radio station. On its Arab Hour, he shared much of his interest in ethnography and history with the Arabic-speaking population of Palestine. Radios were not widely available at the time, but locals would hear broadcasts in village coffeehouses, and Stephan's broadcasts celebrated and valued Palestinian folk traditions and culture, bringing the nation's rich history to the attention of the audience.

After attending the founding of the Palestine Archaeological Museum in the 1930s, with his Armenian wife, Arasky Keshishian, he went on to work as assistant librarian at the Museum. Throughout the 1940s, he worked on a project to make handwritten and photostatic copies of manuscripts in private libraries in Jerusalem, including the Khalidi Library from 1941 to 1948, that are some of the only remaining copies of these works (now at Rockefeller Museum). He was promoted from Assistant Librarian to Archeological Officer in 1945.

Stephan also produced two travel guides with photographer Boulos 'Afif, a fellow Jerusalemite, entitled This is Palestine and Palestine by Road and Rail, published in 1942, and the first of the two books was published as a second edition in 1947.

== Later life and death ==
In 1947, Stephan was still working for the Department of Antiquities, this time on missions to Cyprus, deciphering early Islamic inscriptions. With the Nakba of 1948, he, his wife and two sons, Arthur and Angelo, ended up as Palestinian refugees in Lebanon. His work in Cyprus, at the time a British colony, was to be continued, but he died in 1949. His widow and sons left thereafter to Brazil.

== Published & broadcast works ==
=== Journals & academic translations ===
- Stephan, St. H. (1922). "The Division of the Year in Palestine". Journal of the Palestine Oriental Society. II: 159-170.
- Stephan, St. H. (1922). "Modern Palestinian Parallels to the Song of Songs". Journal of the Palestine Oriental Society. II: 199-278.
- "Al-Mar'a (Woman)" (January 1922). Sarkis.
- Stephan, St. H. (1925). "Lunacy in Palestine Folklore". Journal of the Palestine Oriental Society. V: 1-16.
- Stephan, St. H. (1925). "Animals in Palestinian Folklore". Journal of the Palestine Oriental Society. V: 167-190.
- Stephan, St. H. (1928). "Animals in Palestinian folklore". Journal of the Palestine Oriental Society. VIII: 65-112.
- Stephan, St. H. (1928). "Studies in Palestinian Customs and Folklore: The number Forty". Journal of the Palestine Oriental Society. VIII: 214 - 222.
- "Post-war Bibliographies of Near Eastern Mandates" Stuart C. Dodd, ed. (1930s). Collection of publications on social sciences in the Middle East.
- Stephan, St. H. (1932). "Palestinian nursery rhymes". Journal of the Palestine Oriental Society. XII: 62-85.
- Stephan, St. H. (1932). "Two Turkish inscriptions from the citadel of Jerusalem". Quarterly of the Department of Antiquities in Palestine. 2: 132-135.
- Stephan, St. H. (1933). "The Palestine Arab House, its Architecture and Folklore. By Dr. T. Canaan, 1933. Review". Quarterly of the Department of Antiquities in Palestine: 164-166.
- Baramki, D.; Stephan, St. H. (1935). "A Nestorian hermitage between Jericho and the Jordan". Quarterly of the Department of Antiquities in Palestine. 4: 81-86.
- Stephan, St. H. (1935). "Evliya Tshelebi's travels in Palestine". Quarterly of The Department of Antiquities in Palestine. 4. Annotated by L. A. Mayer: 103-108.
- Stephan, St. H. (1935). "Evliya Tshelebi's travels in Palestine II". Quarterly of The Department of Antiquities in Palestine. 4. Annotated by L. A. Mayer: 154–162.
- Stephan, St. H. (1935). "Evliya Tshelebi's travels in Palestine III". Quarterly of The Department of Antiquities in Palestine. 5. Annotated by L. A. Mayer: 69–73.
- Stephan, St. H. (1936). "Evliya Tshelebi's travels in Palestine IV". Quarterly of The Department of Antiquities in Palestine. 6 (2). Annotated by L. A. Mayer: 84–97.
- Stephan, St. H. (1938). "Evliya Tshelebi's travels in Palestine V". Quarterly of The Department of Antiquities in Palestine. 8 (2): 137-156.
- Stephan, St. H. (1939). "Evliya Tshelebi's travels in Palestine VI". Quarterly of The Department of Antiquities in Palestine. 9 (1): 81-104.
- Stephan, St. H. (1937). "Some Personifications in Colloquial Arabic Speech". Journal of the Palestine Oriental Society. 17: 93–99.
- Evliya Tshelebi's Travels in Palestine (1648–1650), as translator
- Stephan, St. H. (1944). "An Endowment Deed of Khasseki Sultan, dated the 24th May 1552". Quarterly of the Department of Antiquities in Palestine. 10: 170–194, Pls. XXXVI-XL.

=== Radio broadcasts ===
- "Wit and Wisdom in Arabic Folksongs" (13 December 1936)
- "Forgotten Trades of Palestine" (29 January 1937)
- "Turkish Monuments in Palestine" (1 April 1937)
- "Libraries of the Umayyads" (7 November 1938)
- "History of Palestine" series, including the Stone Age, the "Nomadic" age, and under the rule of the Pharaohs, Assyrians, and Greeks (November–December 1938)
- "The festival of Nebi Rubeen in Southern Palestine" (28 August 1938)

=== Phrasebooks & travel guides ===
- Arabic Self-Taught: A Primer (1935), Steimatsky, (English)
- Leitfaden für den Selbstunterricht in der arabischen Sprache (with an accompanying Sprachführer, or phrasebook), 1934, Steimatsky (German)
- This is Palestine: A Concise Guide to the Important Sites in Palestine, Transjordan and Syria, (1942, 2nd edition 1947), Bayt-ul-Makdes Press
- Palestine by Road and Rail: A Concise Guide to the Important Sites in Palestine and Syria (1942), Jerusalem

== Bibliography ==
- Irving, Sarah (Spring 2018). "A Young Man of Promise: Finding a Place for Stephan Hanna in the History of Mandate Palestine". Jerusalem Quarterly (73). doi:10.70190/jq.I73.p42.
- Irving, Sarah (2015), A Turk, an Arab and a Jew: translating historic Palestine under the Mandate, University of Edinburgh
- Irving, Sarah R. (2017). "Intellectual networks, language and knowledge under colonialism: the work of Stephan Stephan, Elias Haddad and Tawfiq Canaan in Palestine, 1909–1948" (PDF). Literatures, Languages and Cultures PhD Thesis Collection. University of Eidenburgh.
- Irving, Sarah (2019). "'This is Palestine': history and modernity in guidebooks to Mandate Palestine". Contemporary Levant. 4: 64–74. doi:10.1080/20581831.2019.1594613. S2CID 166725627.
- Tamari, Salim (2009). "Lepers, Lunatics and Saints: The Nativist Ethnography of Tawfiq Canaan and his Jerusalem Circle". Mountain Against the Sea. Berkeley: University of California Press. ISBN 978-0-520-25129-8.
