= Leo Aryeh Mayer =

Israeli scholar of Islamic art (1895–1959)

- ליאון אריה מאיר
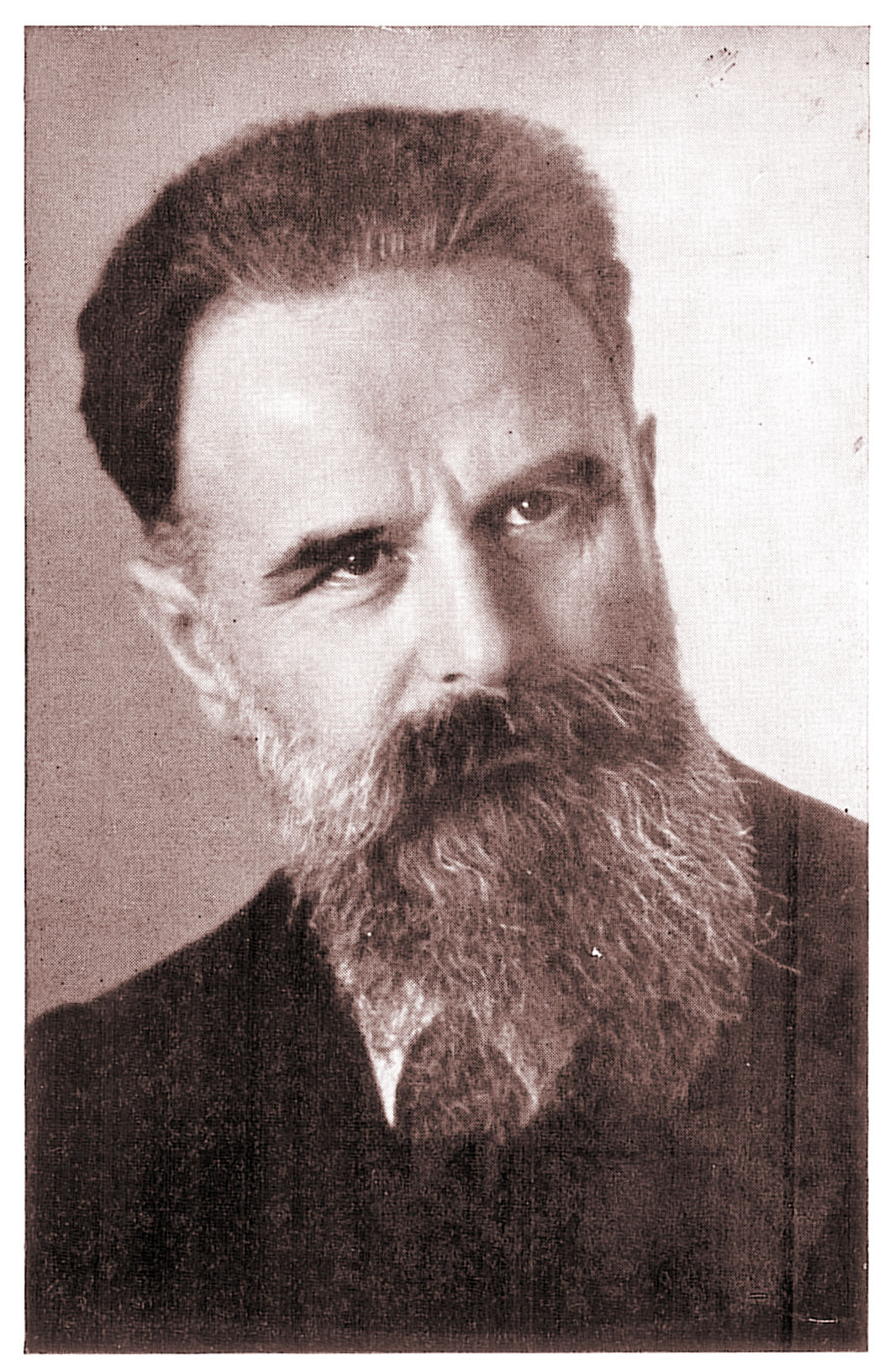
- Born: 12 January 1895; Stanisławów, Galicia, Austria-Hungary
- Died: 6 April 1959 (aged 64); Jerusalem, Israel
- Education: University of Vienna; University of Lausanne; University of Berlin
- Occupations: Scholar, professor, rector
- Employer: Hebrew University of Jerusalem
- Awards: OBE (1948); Israel Prize (1958)

Academic work
- Discipline: Islamic art, Archaeology
- Institutions: Hebrew University of Jerusalem
- Notable works: Co-excavator of the "Third Wall" of Jerusalem

Leo Aryeh Mayer OBE (Hebrew: ליאון אריה מאיר; 12 January 1895 – 6 April 1959), was an Israeli scholar of Islamic art and rector of the Hebrew University of Jerusalem.

== Biography ==
Mayer was born in 1895, in the city of Stanisławów, Galicia, then in Austria-Hungary (now renamed Ivano-Frankivsk in Ukraine), to an eminent rabbinical hasidic family. In 1913, he went to study Eastern Art at the University of Vienna, specialising in the Muslim East and its cultural history, and also studied at the University of Lausanne and the University of Berlin. He was awarded a doctorate by the University of Vienna in 1917 for an unpublished thesis on town planning in Islam. While in Vienna, he also trained in the Jewish Theological Seminary in Vienna, and began to operate within the Zionist "Hashomer" movement (later to become the Hashomer Hatzair).

In 1917, Mayer finished his studies and began teaching and working as an assistant librarian at the Institute of Oriental. In 1919, he returned to his hometown and started teaching in high school. However, due to the turmoil that followed the First World War (Stanisławów was fought over, and occupied at different time, by the forces of Poland, the West Ukrainian National Republic, Romania, the Ukrainian separatist forces and the Red Army, before it was finally incorporated into Poland until 1939), Meyer moved to Berlin and was employed in the oriental department of city's state library.

Mayer emigrated to Mandate Palestine in 1921 and began working the Department of Antiquities of the government of the British Mandate, as an inspector until 1929, and from 1929 to 1933 as Director of the Archives. After leaving the department, he was given the honorary appointment as a supervisor at the new Government museum in Jerusalem.

In the meantime, in 1925, Meyer had joined the first staff of the Institute of Jewish Studies of the Hebrew University of Jerusalem, and was appointed Lecturer in Islamic Art and Archaeology in 1929. In 1932, he was promoted to full professor, becoming the first Sir David Sassoon Professor of Near Eastern Art and Archaeology and served as Dean of the Faculty of Arts and as Rector of the university from 1943 to 1945.

Mayer also worked jointly with Eleazar Sukenik, in connection with the excavations of the "Third Wall" of Jerusalem, built by Agrippa, king of Judea, in 41–44 CE.

From 1940 to 1950, Mayer served as president of the Israel Exploration Society and was honorary president of the Israel Oriental Society. He was also elected a member of government Archaeological Council, a member of the Land of Israel Folklore Society, a member of Association of Archaeologists in London and an honorary member of American Heraldry Society.

== Awards and honours ==
- In 1948, Mayer was made an honorary Officer of the Order of the British Empire (OBE) by King George VI.
- In 1958, he was awarded the Israel Prize, in the humanities.
- The L. A. Mayer Institute for Islamic Art in Jerusalem, established in 1974, was founded in his memory.

== Published books (partial) ==
- Excavations at the Third Wall of Jerusalem's Old City, 1930 (jointly with A.L. Sukenik)
- Mayer, L. A. (1933). Saracenic Heraldry: A Survey. Oxford: Oxford University Press.
- Beginning and rise of Islamic Archeology, 1935
- Annual bibliography of Islamic art and archaeology :India excepted, 1935
- Mayer, L.A., ed. (1936). Annual bibliography of Islamic art and archaeology: India excepted. Vol. II. Jerusalem: Divan Publishing House.
- Mayer, L.A., ed. (1937). Annual bibliography of Islamic art and archaeology: India excepted. Vol. III. Jerusalem: Divan Publishing House.
- new Material for Mamaluk Heraldry, Jerusalem, 1937
- articles in Ars Islamica, 1936-7
- Bibliography of Islamic numismatics, Royal Asiatic Society, 1939, 1954
- Mamaluk costume, 1952
- Religious buildings of the Muslims in Israel, 1950 (jointly with Jacob Pinkerfeld and Yigael Yadin)
- L'art juif en terre de l'Islam, 1959
- Bibliography of Jewish Art
- Islamic Architects and their works, 1956
- Islamic Astrolabists and their works, 1956
- Islamic Metalworkers and their works, 1959
- Islamic Armourers and their works, 1962

== Published articles (partial list) ==
- Mayer, L.A. (1923). "Arabic Inscriptions of Gaza". Journal of the Palestine Oriental Society. III: 69-78.
- Mayer, L.A. (1925). "Le Blason de l'Amir Salar". Journal of the Palestine Oriental Society. V: 58-60.
- Mayer, L.A. (1925). "Arabic Inscriptions of Gaza. II". Journal of the Palestine Oriental Society. V: 64-68.
- Mayer, L.A. (1933). "Two inscriptions of Baybars". Quarterly of The Department of Antiquities in Palestine. 2: 27-33.
- Mayer, L.A. (1933). "Satura Epigraphica Arabica II -Safad". Quarterly of The Department of Antiquities in Palestine. 2: 127-135.
- Mayer, L.A. (1934). "Lead coins of Barquq". Quarterly of The Department of Antiquities in Palestine. 3: 20-23.
- Mayer, L.A. (1934). "Satura Epigraphica Arabica III". Quarterly of The Department of Antiquities in Palestine. 3: 24-25.
- Mayer, L.A. (1934). "A hoard of Mamluk coins". Quarterly of The Department of Antiquities in Palestine. 3: 167-171.
- Mayer, L.A. (1935). "A hoard of Umayyad dinars from el Lajjun". Quarterly of The Department of Antiquities in Palestine. 4: 100-102.
- Mayer, L.A. (1935). "Evliya Tshelebi's travels in Palestine". Quarterly of The Department of Antiquities in Palestine. 4. St. H. Stephan translation, annotated by L. A. Mayer: 103-108.

== See also ==
- List of Israel Prize recipients
- L. A. Mayer Institute for Islamic Art
