= Karl Parker =

English art historian and museum curator

Sir Karl Parker CBE FBA

Keeper of the Ashmolean Museum
- In office 1945–1962
- Preceded by: Edward Thurlow Leeds
- Succeeded by: Robert Hamilton

Personal details
- Born: 2 July 1895
- Died: 22 July 1992 (aged 97)
- Education: University of Freiburg; University of Zürich

Sir Karl Theodore Parker, CBE, FBA (2 July 1895 – 22 July 1992), occasionally known as KTP, was an English art historian and museum curator. He was Keeper of the Ashmolean Museum, Oxford from 1945 to 1962 and Trustee of the National Gallery from 1962 to 1969.

== Early life and education ==
Parker was born on 2 July 1895 in Marylebone, London, England. He was the younger son of Robert William Parker, a surgeon, and Marie Amélie Parker (née Lüling). He was educated at the private Bedford School, and the Lycée Saint-Louis, Paris. He then studied chemistry at the German University of Freiburg. He went on to study at the University of Zürich where he presented a doctoral thesis on "Oliver Cromwell's reputation traced through English literature." He was awarded an honorary Doctor of Letters (DLitt) degree by the University of Oxford in 1972.

== Career ==
Having spent much of his time while at university in print rooms and art galleries, Parker began volunteering in the print room of the British Museum upon his return to England in 1924. In 1925, he achieved employment at the British Museum as an assistant keeper in its print room. He became an expert in Old Master drawings, and served as general editor of the Drawings of the Masters series from its inception in 1926 until it ended in 1940.

In 1934, Parker joined the Ashmolean Museum, University of Oxford, as keeper of the Department of Fine Art. During the Second World War, he oversaw the movement of the works held by the museum to Chastleton House, a country house in Oxfordshire. He additionally served as Keeper of the Ashmolean Museum (i.e., head of the whole museum) between 1945 and 1962. Having then retired, he maintained a link with the art world as a trustee of the National Gallery, serving as such between 1962 and 1969.

== Personal life ==
On 14 January 1928, Parker married Audrey Isabel James (born 1906 or 1907), daughter of Henry Ashworth James, of Herstmonceux Place, Herstmonceux, Sussex. They had two daughters, Lavinia and Caroline. Together they had two daughters, Lavinia and Caroline. His wife predeceased him, dying in 1976.

== Honours ==
In the 1954 Queen's Birthday Honours, he was appointed a Commander of the Order of the British Empire (CBE) in recognition of his service as Keeper of the Ashmolean Museum, University of Oxford. In the 1960 New Year Honours, he was appointed a Knight Bachelor, in recognition of further service as Keeper of the Ashmolean Museum, and therefore granted the title sir. He received the accolade from Prince Philip, Duke of Edinburgh (acting on behalf of Queen Elizabeth II) during a ceremony at Buckingham Palace on 9 February 1960.
