= Raymond-Jacques Tournay =

French-Dominican scholar (1912–1999)

Raymond-Jacques Tournay (1912–1999) was a French Dominican, member of the École Biblique, Biblical scholar and assyriologist.

== Honours ==
Tournay is recipient of two French titles: ordre national du Mérite (1972) then Légion d'honneur (1981).

On 15 November 1994 the University of Fribourg awarded him an honorary degree for half a century of both scientific activity, efforts to promote peace between Jews and Arabs, and concern for the poor and political prisoners .

== Biography ==
Jacques Tournay was born on 28th March 1912 in the 16e arrondissement of Paris, from Maxime Tournay and Marie Périnelle. He was the eldest of four children (Jacques, Marie-Thérèse, Michel and Georges). He went to Ecole Primaire des Frères des Écoles Chrétiennes in rue de Grenelle, then to Collège Stanislas in Paris, and Collège Albert de Mun in Nogent-sur-Marne.

On 14th September 1930 he started his training as a novice to become a Dominican friar in Amiens, where he was given the name of Raymond. He read philosophy and theology at Saulchoir de Cain, in Belgium, where he studied with well-known theologians Yves Congar, Marie-Dominique Chenu ou Antonin-Gilbert Sertillanges.

He was ordained priest on 14th July 1936. He was chosen to attend the École Biblique in Jérusalem. He began studying Assyro-Babylonian in Louvain with Canon Georges Ryckmans. Shortly after, he began studying Akkadian with Father Jean-Vincent Scheil, O.P., the first translator of the famous Code of Hammurabi, who introduced him to the circle of Parisian orientalists.

In September 1938, he arrived in Palestine. He returned to France in 1940 and attended classes taught by René Labat and Jean Nougayrol at the École Pratique des Hautes Études throughout the war. He began to study the legends of Gilgamesh. He joined a network designed to help Jewish colleagues and expanded his work to include involvement in the resistance, notably by distributing clandestine writings, narrowly escaping arrest by the Germans on several occasions.

He returned to Palestine in 1946 and devoted himself to deciphering ancient inscriptions. He repeatedly worked to help Arabs who were victims of Israeli territorial policy.

Beginning in 1964, he became the teacher of 17-year-old Prince Hassan, brother of King Hussein of Jordan. For several years, a car picked him up every week and took him to Amman, where he taught him French, Hebrew, and even Aramaic. After the Six-Day War, he played a diplomatic role as an unofficial intermediary between the Jordanian royal family, France, the Vatican, and with some of his Israeli friends.

From 1972 to 1981, he was director of the Jerusalem Bible School (EBAF), where he had been a professor since 1946.

He died on 25th November 1999 in Jerusalem.

== Bibliography ==
- Le Psautier de Jérusalem, Éditions du Cerf, 1986 ISBN 978-2-204-02465-5
- L'Épopée de Gilgamesh Introduction, traduction et notes, ouvrage publié avec le concours du CNRS, with Aaron Shaffer, Éditions du Cerf, 1977 ISBN 978-2-204-05003-6 (series Littératures anciennes du Proche-Orient)
- Quand Dieu parle aux hommes le langage de l'amour. Études sur le Cantique des Cantiques, Gabalda, 1995 ISBN 978-2-85021-077-8
- Voir et entendre Dieu avec les Psaumes. Ou la liturgie prophétique du second Temple à Jérusalem, Gabalda, 1982 ISBN 978-2-85021-031-0

Preface

- Prince Hassan bin Talal, Islam et Christianisme, Brepols, 1997 ISBN 978-2-50383136-7
