= Pierre Benoit (theologian) =

Maurice Benoit, also Pierre-Maurice and Maurice-Marie Benoit (3 August 1906 – 23 April 1987), better known as Father Pierre Benoit, was a French Catholic priest, exegete, and theologian who became an expert on the archaeology of Jerusalem. Pierre Benoit impressed with his combination of both unswerving Christian faith, and skeptical and open-minded approach to biblical history typical for a scientist, the one side never impeding on the other.

== Biography ==
A Dominican, Pierre Benoit studied the New Testament at the École Biblique in Jerusalem where he arrived in 1933. He taught at the École until 1984 and directed the institute between 1966 and 1971 or 1964–1972, as well as its journal, the Revue biblique, from 1953 to 1968. An expert on the Second Vatican Council, he became a member of the Pontifical Biblical Institute and of the Pontifical Biblical Commission.

His work was principally composed of the translation of biblical texts written in Koine Greek, and the co-ordination of the translation of the Bible into French, resulting in La Bible de Jérusalem (1956), which preceded by a decade and informed the English-language Jerusalem Bible. In particular, he was the author of the translation of the Gospel of Matthew in this edition, as well as the Epistles to the Philippians, Philemon, the Colossians, and the Ephesians.

Pierre Benoit was also the author of a four-volume work entitled Exegesis and Theology, published between 1961 and 1982 at Éditions du Cerf.

In 1971 he became the publication director for the Qumran Manuscripts, acting as chairman of the international committee in charge of publishing a great part of the Dead Sea Scrolls. For a period he was editor-in-chief of the Discoveries in the Judaean Desert-series where he oversaw the publication of volumes 6 and 7. His term, as editor, ended in 1986.

Pierre Benoit took a close interest in the historical topography of Jerusalem, making detailed visits to the excavations. In the 1970s he became more deeply involved in the archaeological research of Christian sites in Jerusalem. One of his most extensive pieces of work in this field was the thorough and definitive assessment of previous excavations done by others at the site of the Antonia Fortress, and the surrounding area.

== Works ==
- The Holy Bible (a translation under the ordinances of the École Biblique), The French Book Club, Paris, 1955–1956
- How Does the Christian Confront the Old Testament, Volume 30: Concilium Theology in the Age of Renewal (1968)
- The Breaking of Bread, Volume 40: Concilium; Theology in the Age of Renewal (1969)
- The Jerusalem Bible: The Holy Bible (a French translation, under the ordinances of the École Biblique), New ed. revised and augmented, Éditions du Cerf, Paris, 1973
- The Jerusalem Bible (a translation under the ordinances of the École Biblique), New ed. reviewed and corrected, Éditions du Cerf, Paris, 1998 ISBN 2-204-06027-5
- Pierre Benoit, Exégèse et théologie (Exegesis and Theology), Éditions du Cerf, Paris, 4 vol. (1961-1982); ISBN 2-204-01813-9 for vol. IV
- Un siècle d’archéologie à l’École biblique de Jérusalem 1890-1990, Jérusalem, École biblique et archéologique française de Jérusalem, 1988
- Synopse des quatre évangiles en français, Paris, Éd. du Cerf, 1990
- Passion et Resurrection du Seigneur (1966), Les Éditions du Cerf, Paris, 1966; English translation: The Passion and Resurrection of Jesus Christ (1969), Herder & Herder; Darton, Longman and Todd, New York, London. Italian: P. Gribaudi, Torino, 1967. Spanish: Fax, Madrid, 1971.
- Christmas: A Pictoral Pilgrimage (1970) Abingdon Press, Nashville, New York
- Jesus and the Gospel (1973) Seabury Press, New York
- Jesus and the Gospel, Volume 2: (A translation of selected articles from "Exegese et Théologie" (1974) Herder & Herder; Darton, Longman and Todd, New York, London

== See also ==
- Jerusalem Bible
- École Biblique
