= Ernest Richmond =

Ernest Tatham Richmond (15 August 1874 – 5 March 1955) was a British architect, who worked in Egypt, Britain, France and Palestine.

== Biography ==
Ernest Tatham Richmond was born in Hammersmith, London, on 15 August 1874. He was the younger son of the painter and designer, Sir William Blake Richmond. He qualified as an architect in 1900; but in 1895 had already visited Egypt and assisted Somers Clarke with his book on the temple of Amenhotep III.

From 1902 to 1903 Richmond served in the Royal Engineers on construction works for the British army of occupation in Egypt. In 1904 he was appointed architect in the Ministry of Works, and rose to be Director of the Department of Towns and State buildings, serving in that capacity until 1911, when he returned to private practice in Britain. In 1906 he married Margaret Muriel Lubbock.

During the First World War Richmond worked for the War Office from 1914–16, joining up at first in the Ambulance Corps. After suffering an injury to his hand from a grenade, he was appointed Architect to the War Graves Service, France, 1917–18.

After the War he was recruited as Consulting Architect to the Haram ash-Sharif, Jerusalem, 1918–20, and afterwards as Assistant Civil Secretary (Political), Government of Palestine, 1920–24 - a post from which he resigned in protest against the pro-Zionist policy of the British Government.

In 1926 Richmond was converted to Roman Catholic Christianity; and thereafter his Christian faith played a greater part in his life and writings.

From 1927 to 1937 Richmond served as Director of Antiquities for the Government of Palestine. Afterwards he returned to Britain and settled in Gloucestershire, where he continued to write and take an interest in Palestine affairs.

He died aged 80 in 1955. The archive of his papers is held by the University of Durham.
