= Robert Hamilton (archaeologist) =

British archaeologist and academic

Robert Hamilton FBA
- Born: Robert William Hamilton; 26 November 1905
- Died: 25 September 1995 (aged 89)
- Education: Winchester College; Magdalen College, Oxford
- Occupations: Archaeologist; Lecturer; Curator
- Title: Keeper of the Ashmolean Museum
- Term: 1962 to 1972
- Predecessor: Sir Karl Parker
- Successor: Sir David Piper
- Spouse: Eileen Hetty Lowick
- Children: Five

Robert William Hamilton, FBA (26 November 1905 – 25 September 1995) was a British archaeologist and academic. He was senior lecturer in Near Eastern archaeology at the University of Oxford from 1949 to 1956 and a fellow of Magdalen College, Oxford, from 1959 to 1972. He was keeper (head) of the Ashmolean Museum from 1962 to 1972.

== Early life ==
Robert Hamilton was born on 26 November 1905. His father was William Stirling Hamilton, a British civil servant working for the Indian Civil Service in the British Raj. His paternal great-grandfather was Sir William Hamilton who was Professor of Logic and Metaphysics at the University of Edinburgh.

From the age of four, Hamilton was educated at Girton Hall School in Torquay, Devon. During this time, his parents were living in India and so he was accompanied and brought up by a nurse. He spent 1911 and 1912 in India with his family, and experienced the life of a child of the colonial elite. He then returned to England and boarded at Copthorne School in Crawley, Sussex. From 1919 to 1924, he was educated at Winchester College, an all-boys public school in Winchester, Hampshire. He then matriculated into Magdalen College, Oxford to study classics. Having gained a double first, achieving firsts in both Mods and Greats, he graduated from the University of Oxford with a Bachelor of Arts (BA) degree in 1928.

== Career ==
In 1929, Hamilton was involved in the joint Yale University and British School of Archaeology in Jerusalem excavation of Jerash in Jordan, and that of Tel Megiddo in Palestine. In 1930, he returned to Jerash and also assisted in the excavation of the pyramid at Meidum. From 1930 to 1931, for six months, he served as the only assistant to Reginald Campbell Thompson at the excavation of Nineveh. His duties included processing the pottery and classical inscriptions found at the site, and supervising the Arabic speaking labourers. From 1931 to 1938, he was chief inspector of antiquities in the British Mandate of Palestine. He was appointed director of antiquities in Palestine in 1938 and officially held the position until 1948. From 1938 to 1942 he supervised in the renovation and excavation of the al-Aqsa Mosque. His career in the Near East was interrupted by World War II and the Jewish insurgency in Palestine. He was forced to leave Palestine with the creation of the State of Israel in 1948.

From 1948 to 1949, Hamilton was secretary-librarian of the British School of Archaeology in Iraq. His main duty was to find a permanent base for the School in Iraq; he successfully acquired a house in the centre of Baghdad. He joined Max Mallowan and Agatha Christie for the 1949 excavation at Nimrud.

Hamilton was senior lecturer in Near Eastern archaeology at the University of Oxford from 1949 to 1956. He averaged two lecture courses a year. For example, these included Old Testament archaeology, early Christian archaeology in Palestine, early Muslim architecture, and the art of the caravan cities. He did not enjoy lecturing, and he applied and was accepted for the post of keeper of Department of Antiquities at the Ashmolean Museum in 1956. He was a fellow of Magdalen College, Oxford, his alma mater, from 1959 to 1972, and additionally Keeper of the Ashmolean Museum from 1962 to 1972. During the decade as head of the Ashmolean, he created two new departments; the Department of Coins and the Department of Eastern Art.

He retired in 1972 and moved to rural Suffolk, where he spent his time writing.

== Personal life ==
In 1935, Hamilton married Eileen Hetty Lowick. Together, they had five children; three sons and two daughters.

Hamilton died on 25 September 1995. A memorial service was held for him at St Peter's Church, Westleton, Suffolk.

== Honours ==
Hamilton was elected a Fellow of the British Academy (FBA) in 1960.

== Selected works ==
- Hamilton, R. W. (1944). Guide to Samaria-Sabaste. Jerusalem: Department of Antiquities for Palestine.
- Hamilton, R. W. (1947). The Church of the Nativity, Bethlehem: a guide. Jerusalem: Government of Palestine, Department of Antiquities.
- Hamilton, R. W. (1949). The structural history of the Aqsa Mosque: a record of archaeological gleanings from the repairs of 1938-1942. London: Oxford University Press (for the Government of Palestine by Geoffrey Cumberlege). OCLC 755287785. (OCLC 913480179)
- Hamilton, R. W.; Grabar, O. (1959). Khirbat al-Mafjar: an Arabian Mansion in the Jordan Valley. Oxford: Oxford University Press.
- Hamilton, R. W. (1978). "Jerusalem: Patterns of Holiness". In Moorey, P. R. S.; Parr, P. J. (eds.). Archaeology in the Levant: Essays for Kathleen Kenyon. London: Aris & Phillips. pp. 194–201.
- Hamilton, R. W. (1988). Walid and His Friends: An Umayyad Tragedy. Oxford: Oxford University Press.
- Hamilton, R. W. (1992). Letters from the Middle East by an occasional archaeologist. Edinburgh: Pentland Press.

Cultural offices
Preceded by Sir Karl Parker	Keeper of the Ashmolean Museum; 1962–1973	Succeeded by Sir David Piper
