= École Biblique =

French academic establishment in Jerusalem

Coordinates: 31°47′06″N 35°13′49″E

École biblique et archéologique française de Jérusalem
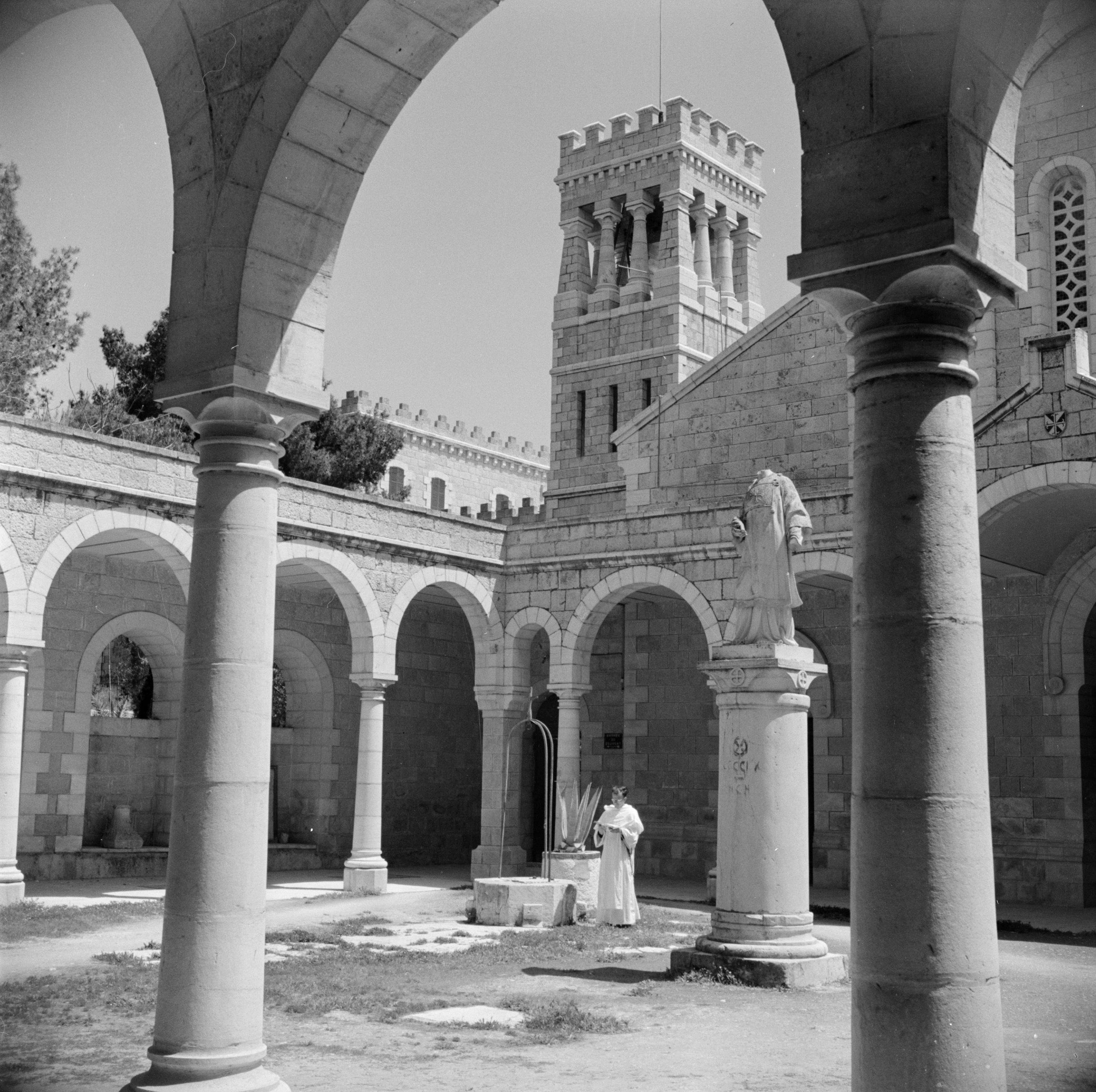
- Saint-Étienne priory, home of the École Biblique.
- Abbreviation: École biblique
- Formation: 1890; 136 years ago
- Founder: Marie-Joseph Lagrange
- Founded at: Jerusalem
- Fields: Biblical studies Biblical archeology
- President: Kevin Stephens
- Director: Oliver Poquillon
- Main organ: Revue Biblique
- Affiliations: Order of Preachers
- Website: www.ebaf.edu

École biblique et archéologique française de Jérusalem, commonly known as École Biblique, is a French academic establishment in Jerusalemspecializing in archaeology and Biblical exegesis. It is housed by the Saint-Étienne priory. Associated with the Order of Preachers (Dominicans), it is one of two major Roman Catholic biblical academies in Jerusalem, along with the Studium Biblicum Franciscanum.

== History ==
=== Foundation ===
The school was founded in 1890 under the name École pratique d'études bibliques, by Marie-Joseph Lagrange, a Dominican priest. Its studies were officially sanctioned by Pope Leo XIII in his Papal Encyclical Providentissimus Deus in 1893.

=== Modernist crisis ===
The election of Pope Pius X in 1903 saw the beginning of a conservative reaction against perceived "Modernists" inside the Catholic Church. Lagrange, like other scholars involved in the 19th-century renaissance of biblical studies, was suspected of being a Modernist. The historical-critical method was considered suspect by the Vatican. Lagrange's 1904 book, The Historical Method, drew criticism. In 1905, the Pontifical Biblical Commission issued a caution about two of his methodological principles.

The situation worsened with the enactment of the papal decree Lamentabili sane exitu and the papal encyclical Pascendi Dominici gregis by Pius X in 1907, both of which condemned Modernism as heretical. In 1909, conflict between the Dominicans and the Jesuits, common at the time, resulted in the Pope's creation of the Pontifical Biblical Institute, as a Jesuit rival to the school. In 1912 Lagrange was given an order of silence for the Revue Biblique to cease publication and to return to France. The École itself was closed for a year, but was then re-opened by the new Pope Benedict XV and Lagrange was allowed to return to Jerusalem continue its work.

=== Subsequent years ===
In 1920 the school took its current name, following its recognition, by the Académie des Inscriptions et Belles-Lettres, as a national archaeological school in France. The enactment of the papal encyclical Divino afflante Spiritu by Pope Pius XII in 1943 officially sanctioned the use of historical criticism in the study of the Bible, ending previous tensions between the school and the Vatican.

Following the discovery of the Dead Sea Scrolls, the scholars at the school have been heavily involved in the translation and interpretation of the texts. In 1956 the School published La Bible de Jérusalem, a work which strove both for critical translational rigour and for quality as a piece of literature; a second, revised version, was published in 1998.

=== Near destruction of the storehouse during the Gaza war ===
Since 2005, the École biblique et archéologique française de Jérusalem (EBAF) has maintained a storehouse in Gaza City for finds from its archaeological research in the region. Israeli forces entered the facility in January 2024 during the Israeli invasion of the Gaza Strip.

On 11 September 2025, the storehouse faced near destruction after the building was designated for an air strike by Israeli forces. Staff and local workers mounted a secret, high-risk evacuation to save most of the 180 cubic meters of archaeological artefacts, including material from the fourth-century Saint Hilarion Monastery, a UNESCO World Heritage site, before the strike. Mosaics and other fragile remains at the excavation sites were left exposed and vulnerable to bombardment.

=== Research and exegesis ===
The school is part of the Dominican St. Stephen's Priory, French: "Couvent de Saint-Étienne". Most teachers of the École Biblique are Dominican friars, and all members of the Dominican priory are involved in the work of the École.

The priory is centred around the modern Basilica of St Stephen (Saint-Étienne) built over the ruins of an ancient predecessor, to which the supposed relics of Saint Stephen were transferred in 439, making the Byzantine-period church the centre of the cult of this particular saint.

Since its creation, the school has been involved in the exegesis of biblical text, and has carried out archaeological research, in a complementary manner and without secrecy, in Palestine and the adjacent territories. Its principal disciplines are epigraphy, the Semitic languages, Assyriology, Egyptology, other aspects of ancient history, geography, and ethnography.

It has the power to confer official doctorates in Holy Scripture.

=== Publications ===
The school publishes an academic journal called Revue Biblique (RB), which shares a diverse range of information from all the school's fields of study.

It also publishes material addressed to larger audiences, including their own French translation of the Bible, known as the Jerusalem Bible (a work intended to provide a thorough and accurate translation, that still retains high literary quality).

== Notable members ==
Among its most illustrious members, in addition to Marie-Joseph Lagrange, are:

- Louis-Hugues Vincent (1872–1960)
- Félix-Marie Abel (1878–1953)
- Roland de Vaux (1903-1971)
- pl:Charles Coüasnon (1904-1976) led the 1961–1977 excavations at the Church of the Holy Sepulchre
- Pierre Benoit (1906-1987)
- Raymond-Jacques Tournay (1912-1999)
- Marie-Emile Boismard (1916-2004)
- Jerome Murphy-O'Connor (1935-2013)
- Jean-Baptiste Humbert (born 1940)
