= Revue Biblique =

French academic journal

Revue Biblique is an academic journal published by the École Biblique, an institute of a French community of Dominicans based in Jerusalem. The journal was established in 1892 by Pierre Batiffol and Marie-Joseph Lagrange.

== Various volumes ==
- 1892
- 1893
- 1894
- 1895
- 1896
- 1897
- 1898
- 1899
- 1900
- 1901
- 1902
- 1903
- 1904
- 1905
- 1906
- 1907
- 1908
- 1909
- 1915
- 1925
- 1926
- 1969
