= St. Stephen's Basilica, Jerusalem =

Church in Jerusalem

Coordinates: 31.7850°N 35.2300°E

St. Stephen's Basilica
- Saint-Étienne
- מנזר סנט אטיין
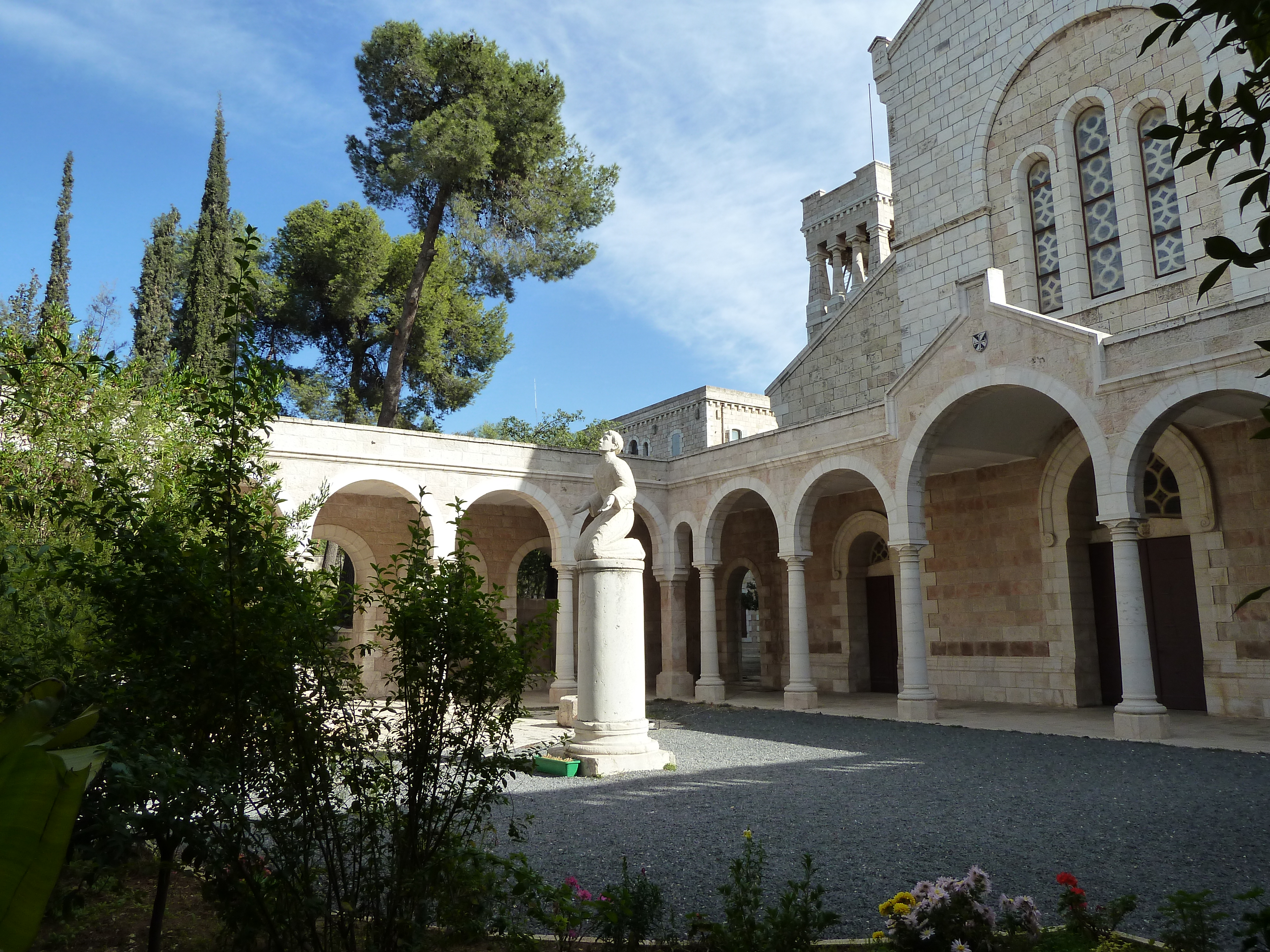
- St. Stephen's Basilica
- Location: Jerusalem
- Denomination: Roman Catholic Church

History
- Founded: 5th Century (original church)
- Founder: Aelia Eudocia (original church)
- Consecrated: 1900 (Dominican basilica)

The St. Stephen's Basilica (Hebrew: מנזר סנט אטיין) or simply the Church of St. Stephen, also known by its French name, Saint-Étienne, is the name given to a Catholic church located outside the walls of the Old City of Jerusalem, on the road leading north to Nablus. It is next to the convent of St. Stephen, home to the French Bible and Archaeology School (École biblique et archéologique française de Jérusalem), and the convent church. An old tradition sees this place as the place where the martyrdom of Saint Stephen took place, the martyr deacon mentioned in the book of Acts (Acts 7: 54–60). A rival site connected to a later, post-Byzantine tradition is located in the Kidron Valley.

== History ==
The first time a sanctuary was built to commemorate the martyrdom was in the fifth century, when Empress Eudocia initiated the building of a structure on the site of the current basilica, a chapel dedicated to St. Stephen, where she was eventually buried. With the arrival of the Persians in 614 and the siege of Jerusalem that followed, the chapel was destroyed.

In 638, a small church was built by St. Sophronius, then restored and enlarged by the Crusaders, but later destroyed by themselves, lest they fall into the hands of Sultan Saladin.

In the nineteenth century the French Dominicans acquired the site of the ancient ruins of the Crusaders, and after archaeological excavations built the convent and the current basilica, which was consecrated in 1900.

Italian architect and engineer, Ermete Pierotti, who served under the Jerusalem governor, Surraya Pasha (1857–1863), thought that St. Stephen's Basilica marked the site of the tomb of Queen Helena, described by Josephus as being "three stadia outside of Jerusalem." This view is today largely rejected, in favor of the Tombs of the Kings.

== See also ==
- Catholic Church in Palestine
