= Marie-Joseph Lagrange =

French biblical scholar

Servant of God Marie-Joseph Lagrange OP
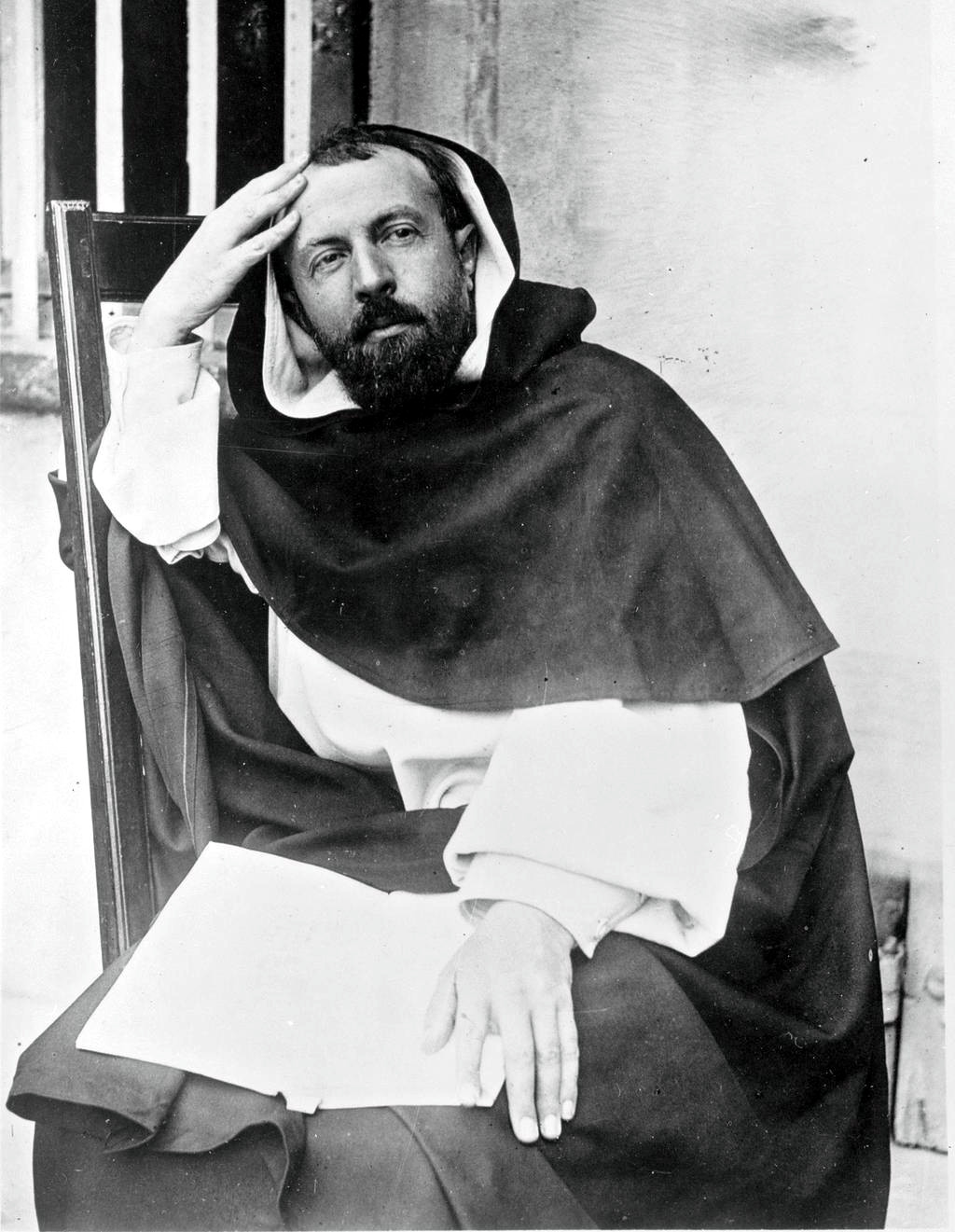
- Père Marie-Joseph Lagrange in 1895
- Born: Albert Marie-Henri Lagrange; 7 March 1855; Bourg-en-Bresse, Ain, Second French Empire
- Died: 10 March 1938 (aged 83); Saint-Maximin-la-Sainte-Baume, Var, French Third Republic

Marie-Joseph Lagrange, OP (born Albert Marie-Henri Lagrange; 7 March 1855 – 10 March 1938) was a French Dominican priest and scholar who founded the École Biblique in Jerusalem. His cause for beatification was initiated in 1991.

== Life ==
Albert Marie-Henri Lagrange was born 7 March 1855, in Bourg-en-Bresse, France. At the age of three, he received a blessing from the Curé d’Ars. At the junior Seminary of Autun, he studied languages: Greek, German, English, and Italian. He studied law at Paris, obtaining a Doctorate in 1878; and he was admitted to practice.

In 1878 he entered the Dominican seminary at Issy-les-Moulineaux, and from there went to the novitiate at St Maximin in Toulouse, where he received the habit and was given the name Brother Marie-Joseph. In 1880, the Dominicans were expelled from France. Lagrange went to the Spanish Dominican house of St. Stephen in Salamanca. He was ordained a priest at Zamora in 1883.

Lagrange was a professor of Church history and Holy Scripture when he was sent to Vienna to improve his knowledge of Oriental languages: Assyrian, Egyptian, Arabic, and Hebrew. He also studied Rabbinical literature. In February 1889, he was sent to Jerusalem, where in November 1890 he opened the École Pratique d’Études Bibliques (Practical School of Biblical Studies). In 1892, he founded the Revue biblique. While some contemporaries criticized the new scientific and critical approach to the Bible, Lagrange made use of it.

A scholar of wide-ranging interests, he was the author of Critique textuelle; II, La critique rationnelle (Paris, 1936), an influential handbook of textual theory and method as related to the textual criticism of the New Testament. He was made a Master of Sacred Theology in 1901. Lagrange's first article in the Revue biblique regarding the likely location of the city of David caused some criticism; even more was generated by '"The Sources of the Pentateuch", a reexamination of Moses' part in the composition of the first five books of the Bible. But Pope Leo was not inclined to discourage new ideas.

Lagrange adhered to the 1893 encyclical Providentissimus Deus of Pope Leo XIII regarding biblical research, and as long as Pope Leo was alive, his work quietly progressed. But after Leo's death, an ultra-conservative reaction set in. Père Lagrange, like other scholars involved in the 19th-century renaissance of biblical studies, was suspected of being a Modernist. The historical-critical method was considered suspect by the Vatican. His 1904 book, The Historical Method, drew criticism. In 1905, the Pontifical Biblical Commission issued a caution about two of his methodological principles. In 1908 he petitioned the Master General for permission to withdraw from Scripture studies. Fr. Cormier, the General at the time, refused and told him to focus instead on the New Testament. In 1912 Lagrange was given an order of silence for the Revue Biblique to cease publication and to return to France. The École itself was closed for a year, and then Lagrange was sent back to Jerusalem to continue his work.

His best known work is L’Évangile de Jésus Christ. Lagrange spent forty-five years in Jerusalem. In 1935 he returned to France permanently for reasons of health, and died on 10 March 1938 at the age of eighty-four. In 1967, his remains were returned to Jerusalem for burial in the choir of the Basilica of St-Étienne, next to the École Biblique.

== Works ==
- Lagrange, Marie-Joseph (1905). Historical Criticism and the Old Testament. London: Catholic Truth Society.
- ——— (1914). Saint Justin, philosophe, martyr. Paris: Libraire Victor Lecoffre.
- ——— (1950) [1916]. Saint Paul: epitre aux Romains. Paris: J. Gabalda.
- ——— (1920). The Meaning of Christianity according to Luther and his followers in Germany. London, New York: Longman, Green and Co.
- ——— (1921). Evangile selon Saint Luc. Paris: Libraire Victor Lecoffre.
- _____ (1923). Évangile selon saint Matthieu. Paris: Libraire Victor Lecoffre.
