= Department of Antiquities (Mandatory Palestine) =

The Department of Antiquities was a department of the British administration of Mandatory Palestine from 1920 to 1948 that was in charge of the protection and investigation of archaeological remains and artefacts in Palestine.

== Operation ==
1918 Antiquities Proclamation

In December 1918, while Palestine was still under control of a British military administration, a Proclamation for the protection of antiquities was issued. In July 1920, the military administration was replaced by a civil administration under High Commissioner Herbert Samuel. One of the first actions of the new government was to establish a Department of Antiquities and promulgate an Antiquities Ordinance that defined its functions and authority. The Ordinance was designed to follow principles outlined in the abortive Treaty of Sèvres, which were later included as Article 21 in the Mandate for Palestine. The main features of the Ordinance were:

- An "antiquity" was defined as any product of human activity before 1700 AD, though there was an exception for objects actively used for religious purposes.
- Authority from the department was required for the disposal or export of an antiquity.
- Permission from the department was required for excavations, and would only be given to "learned societies or institutions or to individuals of proved scientific competence guaranteed by such bodies".
- Proceeds from artefact discovery would be shared by the discoverer and the department in a proportion determined by the department, after objects needed for the "scientific completeness of the Palestine Museum" were chosen.
- The department had the power to expropriate or forcibly lease private property containing important artefacts if no satisfactory agreement with the owners could be reached.

The Ordinance was replaced in 1929 and amended in 1934 and 1946.

As well as a Director, the department had an Archaeological Advisory Board that included representatives of the major archaeological bodies and the main ethnic communities in Palestine. The department included subdivisions for inspectors, a records office and library, a conservation laboratory, a photographic studio, and the museum.

The department was located in a building called "Way House", north of the Old City of Jerusalem. The British School of Archaeology in Jerusalem, established in 1919, also occupied the building until 1930. The Palestine Archaeological Museum, which was managed by the department, was also in Way House until 1935, when it moved with the department to a new building in east Jerusalem donated by John D. Rockefeller. The museum reopened to the public in 1938 and is now popularly known as the Rockefeller Museum.

== Directors ==
- 1920–1926: John Garstang, also director of the British School of Archaeology and member of the Pro-Jerusalem Society's leading Council
- 1927–1937: Ernest Richmond
- 1938–1948: Robert Hamilton

== Publications ==
In addition to many publications on particular sites, and official lists of sites, the department published a journal called the "Quarterly of the Department of Antiquities of Palestine" from 1931 to 1950.

== Successors ==
Since 1948, archaeology in Israel has been under control of the Israel Department of Antiquities. Between 1948 and 1967, the Jordanian Department of Antiquities supervised excavations in the West Bank. The Palestinian Department of Antiquities and Cultural Heritage has conducted work in the West Bank since 1994.

== See also ==
- Department of Antiquities
- American Schools of Oriental Research
- École biblique et archéologique française de Jérusalem
- Jewish Palestine Exploration Society
- Palestine Exploration Fund

== Bibliography ==
- (1932): Quarterly Of The Department Of Antiquities In Palestine Volume: 1
- (1933): Quarterly Of The Department Of Antiquities In Palestine Volume: 2
- (1934): Quarterly Of The Department Of Antiquities In Palestine Volume: 3
- (1934): The Quarterly of the Department of Antiquities in Palestine Vol 3 Index
- (1935): Quarterly Of The Department Of Antiquities In Palestine Volume: 4
- 1935): The Quarterly of the Department of Antiquities in Palestine Vol 4 Index
- (1935): The Quarterly of the Department of Antiquities in Palestine Vol 5 1-2
- (1936): The Quarterly of the Department of Antiquities in Palestine Vol 5 Iss 3
- (1936): The Quarterly of the Department of Antiquities in Palestine Vol 5 Iss 4
- (1936): The Quarterly of the Department of Antiquities in Palestine Vol 5 Index
- (1936): The Quarterly of the Department of Antiquities in Palestine Vol 6 Iss 1
- (1936): The Quarterly of the Department of Antiquities in Palestine Vol 6 Iss 2
- (1937): The Quarterly of the Department of Antiquities in Palestine Vol 6 3-4
- (1938): Quarterly Of The Department Of Antiquities In Palestine Volume: 6 Index
- (1938): Quarterly Of The Department Of Antiquities In Palestine Volume: 7
- (1938): The Quarterly of the Department of Antiquities in Palestine Vol 8 1-2
- (1938): The Quarterly of the Department of Antiquities in Palestine Vol 8 Iss 3
- (1938): The Quarterly of the Department of Antiquities in Palestine Vol 8 Iss 4
- (1939): The Quarterly of the Department of Antiquities in Palestine Vol 8 Index
- (1939): The Quarterly of the Department of Antiquities in Palestine Vol 9 Iss 1
- (1941) The Quarterly of the Department of Antiquities in Palestine : Vol 9 2-4
- (1940): The Quarterly of the Department of Antiquities in Palestine Vol 9 Supplement
- (1940): The Quarterly of the Department of Antiquities in Palestine 1940: Vol 10 Iss 1
- (1942): The Quarterly of the Department of Antiquities in Palestine Vol 10 Iss 4
- (1944): The Quarterly of the Department of Antiquities in Palestine Vol 10 Index
- (1944): The Quarterly of the Department of Antiquities in Palestine Vol 11 1-2
- (1945): The Quarterly of the Department of Antiquities in Palestine Vol 11 Index
- (1945): The Quarterly of the Department of Antiquities in Palestine Vol 12 1-2
- (1946): The Quarterly of the Department of Antiquities in Palestine Vol 12 3-4
- (1947): The Quarterly of the Department of Antiquities in Palestine Vol 13 1-2
- (1948): The Quarterly of the Department of Antiquities in Palestine Vol 13 3-4
- (1950): The Quarterly of the Department of Antiquities in Palestine Vol 14
- "Antiquities Ordinance, 1920". Official Gazette of the Government of Palestine. 29: 4–16. 5 October 1920.
  "Antiquities Ordinance No. 51, 1929". Official Gazette of the Government of Palestine. 236: 548–554. 1 June 1929.
  "Antiquities Ordinance No. 51, 1929". Official Gazette of the Government of Palestine. Gazette Extraordinary: 1190–1191. 31 December 1929.
  "Antiquities (Amendment) Ordinance No. 24, 1934". Palestine Gazette (Suppl. 1). 459: 183–184. 23 August 1934.
  "Antiquities (Amendment) Ordinance No. 62, 1946". Palestine Gazette (Suppl. 1). 1536: 261. 20 November 1946.
- Bentwich, N. and F. M. Goadby (1925). "The Antiquities Law of Palestine". Journal of Comparative Legislation and International Law. 6 (iv): 251–254.
- Garstang, J. (1922). "Eighteen months' work of the Department of Antiquities for Palestine". Palestine Exploration Quarterly. 54 (2): 115–143. doi:10.1179/peq.1922.54.2.57.
- Gibson. S. (1999). "British archaeological institutions in Mandatory Palestine, 1917–1948". Palestine Exploration Quarterly. 131 (2): 115–143. doi:10.1179/peq.1999.131.2.115.
- Glock, A.; L. Glock; N. Lapp (2005). "Archaeology". In P. Mattar (ed.). Encyclopedia of the Palestinians (Revised ed.). Facts On File, Inc. pp. 73–75.
- Government of Palestine (1946). A Survey Of Palestine prepared In December 1945 and January 1946 for the Information of the Anglo-American Committee of Inquiry.
