= List of people from Jerusalem =

This is a list of notable people who were born, lived or are/were famously associated with Jerusalem. The list is in chronological order.

== List ==
=== Ancient ===
- Melchizedek, Jebusite King of Salem and priest who blesses Abram, according to the Hebrew Bible and Old Testament
- Abdi-Heba (c. 1350 BC), Canaanite ruler of Jerusalem under Egyptian patronage, one of the authors of the Amarna letters
- Adonizedek (c. 12th century BC), Amorite King of Jerusalem who resisted Israelite invasion, according to the Book of Joshua
- King David (c. 1040 BCE – c. 970 BCE), first King of the united Kingdom of Israel who conquered Jerusalem, according to the Hebrew Bible and Old Testament
- Zadok, Levitical High Priest of Israel during the reigns of David and Solomon, according to the Hebrew Bible.
- Araunah, Jebusite landowner who sold a plot at Mount Moriah to David who constructed an altar to God, according to the Hebrew Bible
- Solomon the Great (c. 1011 BCE – c. 931 BCE), son of David, who inherited his throne and ruled Jerusalem, according to the Hebrew Bible
- Rehoboam Rehoboam (c. 972 BCE – c. 913 BCE), the last monarch of the United Kingdom of Israel, according to the Hebrew Bible
- Abijah of Judah (c. 950 BCE – 911 BCE), the fourth king of the House of David and the second of the Kingdom of Judah, according to the Hebrew Bible.
- Jehoshaphat (c. 905 BCE – c. 849 BCE), the fourth king of the Kingdom of Judah, according to the Hebrew Bible
- Jehoram of Judah (c. 882 BCE – c. 842 BCE). the fifth king of Judah
- Ahaziah of Judah (c. 863 BCE – c. 841 BCE), the sixth king of Judah
- Jehoash of Judah (c. 843 BCE – c. 796 BCE), the eighth king of Judah
- Amaziah of Judah (c. 822 BCE – c. 767 BCE), the ninth king of Judah
- Uzziah (c. 807 BCE – c. 740 BCE), the tenth king of Judah
- Jotham of Judah (c. 765 BCE – c. 732 BCE), the 11th king of Judah
- Ahaz (c. 762 BCE – c. 716 BCE), the 12th king of Judah
- Hezekiah (c. 739 - c. 687 BC), the 13th king of Judah, the first Israelite/Judaean king whose rule is attested extrabiblically
- Manasseh of Judah (c. 709 BCE – c. 643 BCE), the 14th king of Judah
- Amon of Judah, (c. 664 BCE – c. 641 BCE). the 15th king of Judah
- Josiah (c. 648 BCE – 609 BCE). the 16th king of Judah
- Isaiah, a major prophet of ancient Israel living around the time of 8th-century BC Kingdom of Judah
- Joel, prophet of ancient Israel, the second of the twelve minor prophets

=== Antiquity ===
- Ben Sira (c. 2nd century BC), Hellenistic Jewish scribe, author of the Book of Sirach
- Judas Maccabeus (d. 160 BCE), leader of the Maccabean revolt against the Seleucid Empire
- Herod the Great, (d. 4 BCE), Roman client king of Judea who expanded the Second Temple in Jerusalem and built the fortress at Masada
- Hillel the Elder (110 BCE – 10 CE), famous Jewish religious leader and one of the most important figures in Jewish history, associated with the development of the Mishnah and the Talmud
- Jesus (c. 6-4 BC - 30-33 AD), crucified in Jerusalem, making it a holy city to Christians
- Josephus (37–100), Jewish-Roman historian
- James the Just (d. 69), Jewish-Christian Bishop of Jerusalem
- Eleazar bar Zadok (1st–2nd century CE), rabbi
- Zacchaeus of Jerusalem, one of the Early bishops of Jerusalem, venerated as a saint by both Western and Eastern Churches
- Matthias of Jerusalem (d. 120), early Bishop of Jerusalem and Catholic saint
- Simon bar Kokhba (d. 135), leader of the Bar Kokhba revolt against the Roman Empire in 132 CE
- Alexander of Jerusalem (d. 252), considered the earliest verifiable Bishop of Jerusalem
- Procopius of Scythopolis (c. 270), Palestinian Christian martyr
- Helena, mother of Constantine I (d. 330), buried in the Mausoleum of Helena
- Cyril of Jerusalem (d. 386), theologian and bishop of Jerusalem, exiled more than once, buried in the city
- Juvenal of Jerusalem (d. 458), Greek Orthodox Patriarch of Jerusalem (422-458)
- Elias I of Jerusalem (d. 518), Greek Orthodox Patriarch of Jerusalem (494-516)
- Modestus of Jerusalem (d. 638), saint and Greek Orthodox Patriarch of Jerusalem
- Sophronius of Jerusalem (d. 638), Greek Orthodox Patriarch of Jerusalem (632-634)
- Umar (d. 644), Caliph of the Rashidun Caliphate who conquered the city in 637 and cleared the ground for the Dome of the Rock
- Ubadah ibn al-Samit (583-655), one of the Companions of the Prophet Muhammed who was buried in Bab al-Rahma Cemetery
- Shaddad ibn Aws (d. 677/8), another of the Companions of the Prophet Muhammed buried in Bab al-Rahma Cemetery
- Abd al-Malik ibn Marwan (d. 705), Caliph who oversaw the building of the Dome of the Rock, the earliest archaeologically attested religious monument built by a Muslim ruler
- Anastasius II of Jerusalem (d. 706), Greek Orthodox Patriarch of Jerusalem
- John V of Jerusalem, Greek Orthodox Patriarch of Jerusalem (706-735)

=== Medieval ===
- Muhammad ibn Tughj al-Ikhshid (882-946), Ikhshidid dynasty governor over Jerusalem and other parts of the Levant on behalf of the Abbasid Caliphate who was buried in Jerusalem
- Sahl ben Matzliah (910–990), Jewish Karaite philosopher and writer
- Al-Tamimi (physician) (d. 990), author of several medical works, pharmacist and personal physician to the governor of Ramla
- al-Muqaddasi (946–1000), Arab geographer
- Levi ben Japheth (d. 11th-century), Jewish Karaite scholar
- Aaron of Jerusalem (c. 11th century), Jewish Karaite scholar and Judeo-Arabic author
- Ibn al-Qaisarani (1056–1113), Arab historian
- Ibn Tahir (1057-1113), Islamic scholar and historian
- Baldwin I of Jerusalem (d. 1118), Crusader King who banned Jews from Jerusalem
- Judah Halevi (1075–1141), Spanish Jewish physician, poet, and philosopher
- Baldwin IV of Jerusalem (1161–1185), King of the Crusader State in Jerusalem
- Abu Sulayman Da'ud (c. 12th century), Arab Christian physician and astrologer
- Aymar the Monk (d. 1202), Latin Patriarch of Jerusalem
- Angelus of Jerusalem (1185-1220), Catholic convert from Judaism, a priest with the Carmelites, beatified as a saint
- Nahmanides (1194–1270), prominent medieval Jewish rabbi and physician
- Tanhum of Jerusalem (d. 1291), Judeo-Arabic author and Hebrew lexicographer
- Tankiz (d. 1340), Mamluk viceroy of Syria who commissioned the building of the Tankiziyya, Cotton Merchants' Gate, and several other projects in the Old City
- Nikon of Jerusalem (d. 15th century), Serbian writer of a travelogue to Jerusalem and the Holy Land
- Mujir al-Din al-'Ulaymi, (d. 1519), Palestinian historian and author of al-Uns al-Jalil bi-tarikh al-Quds wal-Khalil ("The glorious history of Jerusalem and Hebron") (c. 1495)

=== Ottoman era ===
- Isaac Luria (c. 1534– 1572), rabbi and Jewish mystic
- Moses Hagiz (1671– c. 1750), Talmudic scholar, rabbi, and writer
- Nissim Chaim Moshe Mizrachi (c. 1690–1749), rabbi
- Mehmed Pasha Kurd Bayram, Ottoman statesman who served as district governor of the Jerusalem Sanjak (1701-03)
- Jonah Nabon (1713-1760), rabbinic scholar
- Chaim Yosef David Azulai (1724–1806), rabbinical scholar, bibliophile, and publisher of Jewish religious writings
- Amram ben Diwan (d. 1782), rabbi
- Procopius I of Jerusalem (d. 1788), Greek Orthodox Patriach of Jerusalem
- Ahmad Agha Duzdar, mayor and governor of the Mutasarrifate of Jerusalem (1838-63)
- Procopius II of Jerusalem (d. 1880), Greek Orthodox Patriach of Jerusalem
- Abdelrahman al-Dajani, mayor of Jerusalem (1863-82)
- Moses Pardo (d. 1888), rabbi and rabbinical emissary
- Faidi al-Alami (d. 1924), mayor of Jerusalem (1906-09)
- Hussein al-Husayni (d. 1918), mayor of Jerusalem (1907-17), the last years of Ottoman Palestine rule

=== Modern ===
born 1820–1849

- William Holman Hunt (1827–1910), English painter, cofounder of the Pre-Raphaelite Brotherhood
- Conrad Schick (1822–1901), German architect, archaeologist and Protestant missionary
- Yosef Rivlin (1836-1896), Orthodox Jewish scholar, writer, and community leader
- Yoel Moshe Salomon (1838-1912), meshulach (Jewish diaspora emissary), entrepreneur , and farmer
- Mohammed Tahir al-Husayni (1842-1908), Grand Mufti of Jerusalem (1865-1908)
- Yousef Al-Khalidi (1842–1906), Mayor of Jerusalem and only Palestinian elected Member of the Ottoman Parliament
- Marie-Alphonsine Danil Ghattas (1843–1927), Palestinian nun beatified as a saint
- Haim Aharon Valero (1845–1923), banker, entrepreneur and a prominent figure in the Jewish community of 19th century Jerusalem

born 1850–1879

- Shlomo Moussaieff (1852–1922), a founder of the Bukharim neighborhood
- Musa al-Husayni (1853-1934), mayor of Jerusalem (1918-1920), head of Palestine Arab Congress
- Yaakov Meir (1856-1939), Orthodox rabbi
- Herbert Plumer (1857–1932), senior British Army officer of the First World War
- Eliezer Ben-Yehuda (1858–1922), Litvak lexicographer and newspaper editor credited for the revival of the Hebrew language in the modern era
- Yosef Navon (1858-1934), Sephardic Jewish businessman who financed the Jaffa–Jerusalem railway
- Menachem Ussishkin (1863–1941), Zionist leader and head of the Jewish National Fund
- David Yellin (1864-1941), educator, researcher of the Hebrew language and literature, and politician
- Abraham Isaac Kook (1865–1935), first Ashkenazi chief rabbi of Mandatory Palestine
- Kamil al-Husayni (1867-1921), Grand Mufti of Jerusalem
- Joseph Klausner (1874–1958), Israeli historian and professor of Hebrew literature
- Khalil al-Sakakini (1878–1953), Palestinian Christian scholar and Arab nationalist
- Mahmoud al-'Askari al-Falaki (?), Sufi sheikh, professional astrologer and amulet-maker

born 1880–1909

- Ben-Zion Meir Hai Uziel (1880-1953), Chief Rabbi of Mandatory Palestine and Israel
- Raghib al-Nashashibi (1881-1951), Palestinian notable who served as the Mayor of Jerusalem (1920-1935)
- Kamel al-Budeiri (1882-1923), Palestinian Arab nationalist, founded of Jerusalem-based Al Sabah newspaper
- Tawfiq Canaan (1882-1964), Palestinian physician, medical researcher and ethnographer
- Boulos Shehadeh (1882-1943), Palestinian journalist. and politician
- Hussam ad-Din Jarallah (1884-1954), Grand Mufti of Jerusalem
- Avraham Elmalih (1885-1967), journalist, linguist, and Israeli politician
- Yitzhak Yaakov Yellin (1885-1964), journalist and founder of the Kiryat Moshe neighborhood in Jerusalem
- Gad Frumkin (1887–1960), judge on the Supreme Court of Mandatory Palestine
- Shmuel Yosef Agnon (1888–1970), Israeli Nobel Prize in Literature laureate writer and was one of the central figures of modern Hebrew fiction
- Helena Kagan (1889–1978), physician, Israeli pioneer in pediatrics
- Yosef Yoel Rivlin (1889-1971), Israeli Oriental studies scholar and professor
- Rachel Bluwstein (1890–1931), Hebrew poet
- Aref al-Aref (born 1891) Palestinian historian, journalist, and politician
- Nathan Michael Gelber (1891–1966), Austrian-Israeli historian
- Ludwig Blum (1891–1975), Czechoslovakia-born Israeli painter, known as "the painter of Jerusalem"
- Daniel Auster (1893–1963), three time Mayor of Jerusalem
- Jamal al-Husayni (1894-1984), Palestinian politician, Minister of Foreign Affairs
- Hussein Khalidi (1895-1962), mayor of Jerusalem (1935-1937), Palestinian minister of Health (1948), Jordanian Minister and PM, briefly in 1956 and 1957
- Musa Alami (born 1897), Palestinian nationalist politician
- Wasif Jawhariyyeh (born 1897), Palestinian oud artist and composer
- Haj Amin al-Husayni (1897–1974), Palestinian Arab nationalist and influential Muslim leader in Mandatory Palestine
- Yaakov Ades (1898–1963), Sephardi Hakham, Rosh Yeshiva, and Rabbinical High Court judge
- Najib Albina (1901-1983), Palestinian master photographer for the Palestine Archaeological Museum
- Anastas Hanania (1903-1995), Palestinian-Jordanian lawyer, judge, minister and diplomat
- Sami Hadawi (1904-2004), Palestinian scholar and author
- Henry Cattan (1906-1992), Palestinian jurist and author
- Abdul Qadir al-Husayni (1907-1948), Palestinian revolutionary and guerilla leader
- Dimitri Baramki (1909-1984), Palestinian archaeologist, chief archaeologist for the Department of Antiquities (Mandatory Palestine)

born 1910s

- Shlomo Zalman Auerbach (1910-1995), Orthodox Jewish rabbi, posek, and rosh yeshiva
- Saad al-Alami (1911-1993), Grand Mufti of Jerusalem
- Teddy Kollek (1911–2007), mayor of Jerusalem and founder of the Jerusalem Foundation
- Yousef Beidas (1912-1968), Palestinian founder of Intra Bank
- Sulaiman Ja'abari (1912-1994), Grand Mufti of Jerusalem
- Ruhi al-Khatib (1914–1994), Palestinian nationalist and politician, last mayor of East Jerusalem
- Ruchoma Shain (1914–2013), teacher and author
- Mufid Nashashibi (1915-1999), founder of the National Liberation League in Palestine
- Ephraim Katzir (1916–2009), biophysicist and fourth President of Israel
- Ismail Khalidi (1916-1968), Palestinian writer and diplomat
- Yigael Yadin (1917–1984), Israeli archaeologist, politician, and second Chief of Staff of the IDF
- Menachem Lewin (1918–2011), Israeli chemist working in polymer, fiber and nanotechnology research
- Nahil Bishara (1919-1997), Palestinian artist and designer
- Nehemiah Persoff (1919-2022), actor and painter

born 1920s

- Serene Husseini Shahid (1920-2008), teacher, author and scholar on Palestinian embroidery
- Haim Corfu (1921-2015), Israeli politician, Irgun commander and assassin
- Yitzhak Navon (1921–2015), politician (fifth President of Israel), diplomat, and author
- Yitzhak Rabin (1922–1995), general, the fifth Prime Minister of Israel, and Nobel Peace Prize winner
- Trude Dothan (1922–2016), Austrian Jewish archaeologist in Israel
- Yitzchok Scheiner (1922–2021), rabbi
- Fatima al-Budeiri (1923-2009), Palestinian radio broadcaster who began their career at Jerusalem Calling
- William A. Smalley (1923–1997), American linguist who developed the Romanized Popular Alphabet for the Hmong language
- Shlomo Hillel (1923–2021), Israeli diplomat, Speaker of the Knesset, Minister of Police and Minister of Internal Affairs
- Zundel Kroizer (1924–2014), rabbi
- Walid Khalidi (1925-2026, Palestinian historian and co-founder of the Institute for Palestine Studies
- Mohammad Zuhdi Nashashibi (1925-2020), Minister of Finance of the Palestinian National Authority
- Uzi Narkiss (1925–1997), Israeli general and commander of the Israel Defense Forces units in the Central Region during the Six-Day War
- Georgette Rizek (1925-2018), Palestinian philanthropist and activist
- Meir Nakar (1926-1947), Irgun militant executed at Acre Prison by British military court
- Rehavam Ze'evi (1926–2001), assassinated Israeli general, historian, founder of the Moledet party, and Minister of Tourism
- Issa J. Boullata (1929-2019), Palestinian scholar and translator of Arabic literature
- Yaakov Blau (1929–2013), rabbi
- Mordechai Eliyahu (1929-2010), Chief Rabbi of Israel

born 1930s

- Reuven Adiv (1930–2004), Israeli and international actor, director and drama teacher
- Robert Aumann (born 1930), Israeli-American mathematician and game-theorist, received the Nobel Prize in Economics in 2005 for his work on conflict and cooperation through game-theory analysis
- Mordechai Gur (1930-1995), Israeli politician and the 10th Chief of Staff of the Israel Defense Forces
- Abraham J. Twerski, (1930–2021), psychiatrist and rabbi
- Ram Karmi (1931-2013), Israeli architect of the Brutalist style
- Yossi Banai (1932-2006), Israeli actor, singer, songwriter, comedian, and theatre director
- Naseer Aruri (1934–2015), Palestinian scholar and activist
- Edward Said (1935–2003), Palestinian author and political theorist
- Mahmoud Bakr Hijazi (1936–2021), Palestinian militant
- Isaac Berger (1936–2022), Olympic champion weightlifter
- Ahmed Qurei (1937-2023), Palestinian politician and second Prime Minister of Palestinian National Authority
- A.B. Yehoshua (1936–2022), Israeli novelist, essayist, and playwright
- Shlomo Aronson (1936–2018), Israeli landscape architect
- Adin Steinsaltz (1937-2020), Israeli Chabad rabbi, teacher, philosopher, social critic, author, translator, and publisher.
- Hanna Siniora (born 1937), Palestinian Christian publisher and politician, member of the Palestine National Council
- Miriam Kara (born 1938), Israeli Olympic gymnast
- Ekrima Sa'id Sabri (born 1939), Grand Mufti of Jerusalem
- Yehoram Gaon (born 1939), Israeli singer, actor, director, producer, TV and radio host, and public figure
- Waled Muhammed Sadi (1939–2019), Palestinian ambassador to Jordan
- Amos Oz (1939–2018), Israeli writer, novelist, and journalist
- Faris Glubb (1939-2004), British writer and Palestinian activist
- Ghada Karmi (born 1939), Palestinian academic, physician and author
- Reuven Rivlin (born 1939), former Minister of Communications and Speaker of the Knesset, former President of Israel
- Ada Yonath (1939–2026), Israeli crystallographer best known for her pioneering work on the structure of the ribosome, winner of the Nobel Prize in Chemistry in 2009

born 1940s

- Khairat Al-Saleh (born 1940), Hurufiyya movement painter, ceramicist, glassmaker and printmaker
- Hatem Ishaq Husseini (1941–1994), Palestinian academic and first president of Al-Quds University
- Lamis al-Alami (born 1943), Palestinian educator and politician, served as Minister of Education for Palestine
- Benny Begin (born 1943), Israeli geologist and politician
- Uri Davis (born 1943), Israeli citizen who identifies as a "Palestinian Hebrew" and was twice elected to the Fatah Revolutionary Council
- Eli Ben Rimoz (born 1944), Israeli international footballer who competed at the 1970 FIFA World Cup
- Matan Vilnai (born 1944), Minister of Science, Culture & Sport, Minister of Science and Technology, Minister for Home Front Defense, Ambassador to China, IDF Major General
- Makram Khoury (born 1945), Israeli Arab actor and winner of the Israel Prize
- Ehud Olmert (born 1945), former mayor of Jerusalem and Prime Minister of Israel
- Princess Firyal (born 1945), Jordanian princess and humanitarian
- Mahmoud al-Zahar (born 1945), co-founder of Hamas
- Yoni Netanyahu (1946–1976), Israeli commander of Sayeret Matkal; killed in action during Operation Entebbe
- Esther Farbstein (born 1946), Israeli Holocaust scholar
- Nahman Shai (born 1946), Israeli journalist, Deputy Speaker of the Knesset, IDF spokesman
- Dan Meridor (born 1947), Israeli Minister of Justice, Minister of Finance, and Deputy Prime Minister
- Miriam Naor (1947-2022), Israeli President of the Supreme Court of Israel
- Ayala Malchan-Katz (born 1949), Israeli five-time Paralympic champion

born 1950s

- Albert Aghazarian (1950-2020), Palestinian historian, university administrator and political spokesperson
- Afif Safieh (born 1950), Palestinian ambassador to the Russian Federation
- Munib Younan (born 1950), president of the Lutheran World Federation
- Mustafa Barghouti (born 1954), Palestinian physician, activist, and PLO politician
- Anat Hoffman (born 1954), Israeli activist and director of Women of the Wall
- Francis Martin O'Donnell (born 1954), former United Nations diplomat, Ambassador of Sovereign Military Order of Malta, author
- Saeb Erekat (1955–2020), Palestinian negotiator of the Oslo Accords with Israel
- Mai al-Kaila (born 1955), Palestinian physician and diplomat who also served as the Minister of Health
- Sallai Meridor (born 1955), Israeli Ambassador to the United States, Chairman of the Jewish Agency for Israel and the World Zionist Organization
- Amira Hass (born 1956), award-winning Israeli journalist
- Jamal Dajani (born 1957), Palestinian-American journalist and producer, co-founder of Arab Talk Radio
- Uri Malmilian (born 1957), Israeli soccer player with most appearances for Beitar Jerusalem F.C.
- Eli Ohana (born 1957), all-time top-scorer for Israel's Beitar Jerusalem F.C.

born since 1960

- Suha Arafat (born 1963, née Suha Daoud Tawil), widow of the Palestinian leader Yasser Arafat
- Ziad Khaddash (born 1964), Palestinian short-story writer
- Guy Starik (born 1965), Israeli Olympian shooter with world record in 50 m rifle prone
- Muhammad Ahmad Hussein (born 1966), Grand Mufti of Jerusalem
- Eran Groumi (born 1970), Israeli Olympic swimmer
- Elisha Abas (born 1971), Israeli pianist, composer, and former professional soccer player
- Yoav Meiri (born 1975), Israeli Olympic swimmer
- Givara Budeiri (born 1976), Palestinian journalist/correspondent
- Samah Jabr (born 1976), Palestinian psychiatrist, psychotherapist and author
- Rami Kashou (born 1976), Palestinian fashion designer
- Zvi Kogan (1996–2024), Israeli-Moldovan rabbi killed in the United Arab Emirates
- Jonah Lotan (born 1973), Israeli actor
- Michael Halika (born 1978), Israeli Olympic swimmer and world championship bronze medalist
- Timna Nelson-Levy (born 1994), Israeli Olympic judoka
- Dor Guez, Jerusalemite artist
- Natalie Portman (born 1981), Israeli-American actress, lived in Jerusalem until she was three years old
- Gal Yekutiel (born 1981), Israeli Olympic judoka
- Rucka Rucka Ali (born 1987), Israeli-American parody rapper and musical artist
- Nimrod Shapira Bar-Or (born 1987), Israeli Olympic swimmer
- Shahar Pe'er (born 1987), Israeli tennis player, highest world singles ranking # 11, highest world doubles ranking # 14
- Or Sasson (born 1990), Israeli Olympic medalist judoka
- Adva Cohen (born 1996), Israeli Olympic runner
- Tomer Frankel (born 2000), Israeli Olympic swimmer
- Asaf Yasur (born 2002), Israeli Paralympic champion and world champion taekwondo athlete

unknown date of birth

- Meche Marchand, Puerto Rican actress and writer

== Honorary citizens ==
People awarded the honorary citizenship of Jerusalem are:

Date	Name	Notes
29 November 2015	Elie Wiesel (1928–2016)	1986 Nobel Peace Prize Winner

== See also ==
- Demographic history of Jerusalem
- List of Israelis
- List of Palestinians
- Mayor of Jerusalem
- Timeline of Jerusalem

== Bibliography ==
- Cline, Eric H. (2004). Jerusalem Besieged From Ancient Canaan to Modern Israel. University of Michigan Press.
- Friedmann, Yohanan, ed. (1992). The History of al-Ṭabarī, Volume XII: The Battle of al-Qādisīyyah and the Conquest of Syria and Palestine. SUNY Series in Near Eastern Studies. Albany, New York: State University of New York Press. ISBN 978-0-7914-0733-2.
- Johns, Jeremy (January 2003). "Archaeology and the History of Early Islam: The First Seventy Years". Journal of the Economic and Social History of the Orient. 46 (4): 411–436. doi:10.1163/156852003772914848. S2CID 163096950.
