= Islamic leadership in Jerusalem =

Leader of the Muslim community in Jerusalem

Islamic Leadership in Jerusalem refers to the leading cleric (ulema) of the Muslim community in Jerusalem. Historically, the primary religious leader was the Qadi. During the late Ottoman Empire, Muftis, particularly the Mufti of the Hanafi school, came to prominence; and during the British military administration the post of Grand Mufti of Jerusalem was created, which continues today.

== Ottoman era ==
For most of the Ottoman period, until the late nineteenth century and the creation of the Mutasarrifate of Jerusalem, the muftis of Jerusalem were considered to be outranked by the Qadis. The status of the mufti began to increase as the Ottoman Empire became more secular from the mid-nineteenth century on. The legal role of the Qadi began to diminish in importance.

The elevation of the muftis' status was made legal on 26 April 1913 with the passing of the Temporary Law Concerning the Appointment of Shari'a Judges and Officials, which noted that "the muftis head the ulama' of their locality".

During the Ottoman period, the Mufti of Jerusalem was subordinated to Istanbul's Shaykh al-Islām, and his role was limited to local vicinity of Jerusalem and later the wider Mutasarrifate of Jerusalem. When the British authorities took control, they severed the link with Istanbul, and widened the jurisdiction of the Mufti to cover the whole of Mandatory Palestine.

The position of Qadi was usually a one-year role, and was appointed by the central Ottoman government, whilst the muftis were usually a member for a notable family in the town.

== British Mandate ==
When Mohammed Tahir al-Husayni died in 1908, his son Kamil al-Husayni succeeded him and served with approval of the British authorities once the British conquered Jerusalem in December 1917. However, during World War I, the Ottoman Empire claimed that al-Husayni was a British stooge and that As'ad Shuqeiri-who was appointed by the Ottoman Empire as the Qadi 1914-1918-was the rightful Islamic leader of the region. Shuqeiri was the father of Ahmad Shukeiri (1908–1980), the first leader of the Palestine Liberation Organisation.

Shortly after the 1917 Battle of Jerusalem, newly appointed British Military Governor Ronald Storrs met with Hussein al-Husayni, who explained that the majority of Jerusalem's 11,000 Muslim residents were followers of the official Ottoman Hanafi rite, with a minority following the Shafi’i school which had been predominant prior to the Ottoman conquest. At the time there was a Hanafi mufti and a Shafi’i mufti of Jerusalem. Storrs advised the British government to declare that there would only be a single recognized post of mufti going forward.

The British created the role of Grand Mufti of Jerusalem. The idea was borrowed from that of the Grand Mufti of Egypt. The British also combined the traditional roles of mufti and qadi.

== List ==
=== Pre-Ottoman Qadis ===
- Shihab ad-Din Abulabbas al-Omawi al-Masri ? to 1440

=== Ottoman Qadis ===
- Shaikh Najm al-Din, late 17th century
- 'Ali ibn Habib Allah ibn Abi '1-Lutf, d. 1731
- Muhammad ibn 'Abd al-Rahim Jarallah (Abu '1-Lutf), d. 1728
- Muhammad al-Khalili, d. 1734
- Ahmad ibn Muhammad al-Muwaqqit, d. 1757
- Najm al-Din al-Khairi, d. 1759
- Muhammd al-Tafilati, d. 1778
- Sheikh Ḥasan b. ‘Abd al-Laṭīf al-Ḥusayni (1781-1806/7)
- Muhammad Salih al-Imam, d. 1828
- Muḥammad Fadil Jārallāh d. 1856

=== Ottoman Hanafi Muftis ===
- Mohammed Tahir al-Husayni from 1869 to 1908
- Kamil al-Husayni from 1908 to the creation of the "Grand Mufti" title
  - During World War I (1914–1918), the Ottoman Empire claimed that As'ad Shuqeiri was the Qadi.

== See also ==
- Jerusalem in Islam
- Custodian of the Two Holy Mosques

== Bibliography ==
- Porath, Yehoshua (1971). "Al Hajj Amin al Huseyni, Mufti of Jerusalem". Asian and African Studies. Jerusalem Academic Press.
- Pappe, Ilan (2012). The Rise and Fall of a Palestinian Dynasty: The Huyaynis 1700 - 1948. Saqi. pp. 122–123. ISBN 978-0-86356-801-5.
