= Demographic history of Jerusalem =

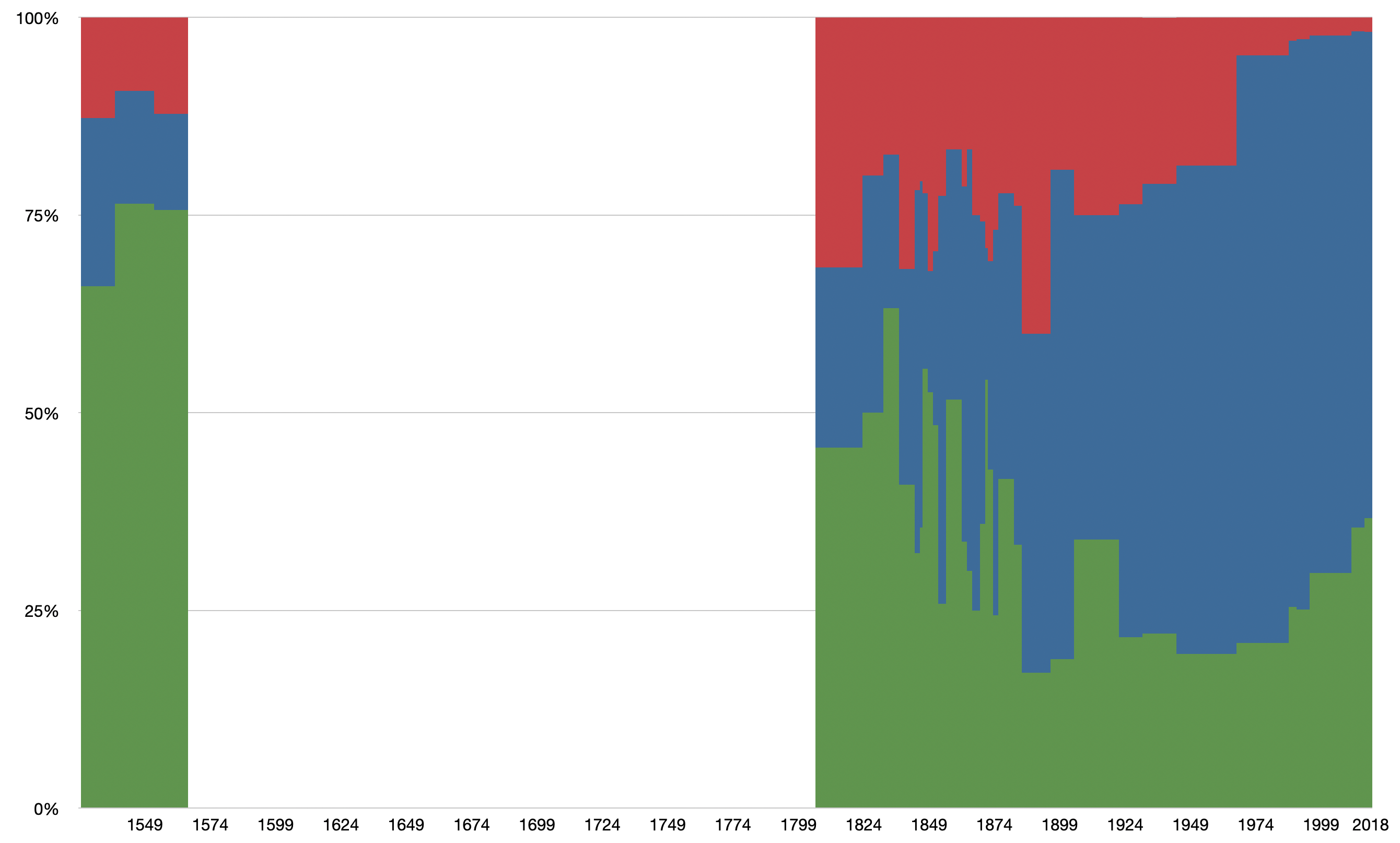
Demographic history of Jerusalem by religion from the Ottoman period onwards, based on available data Christians Jews Muslims

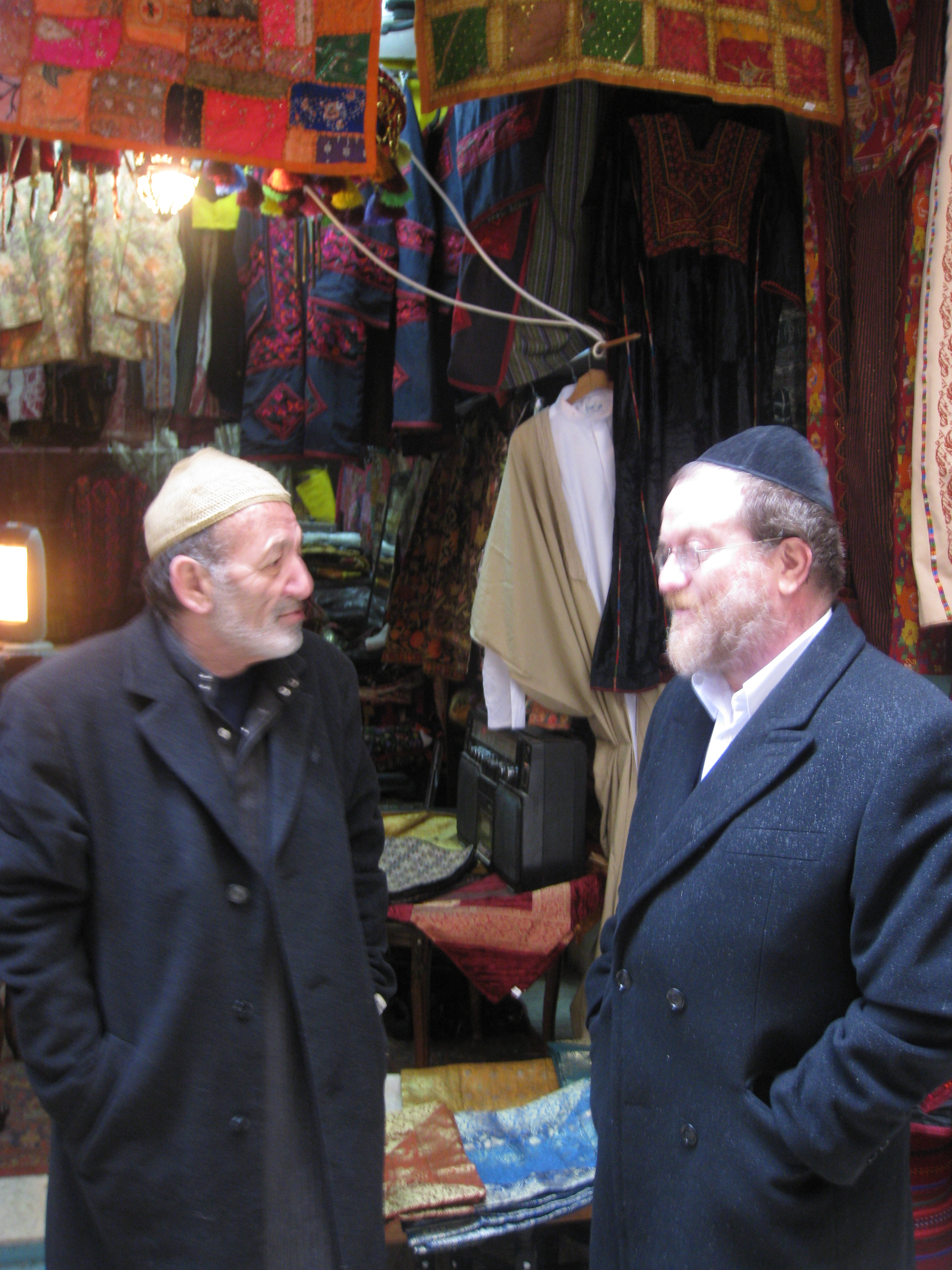
Arab and Jew at Arab bazaar, Old City of Jerusalem

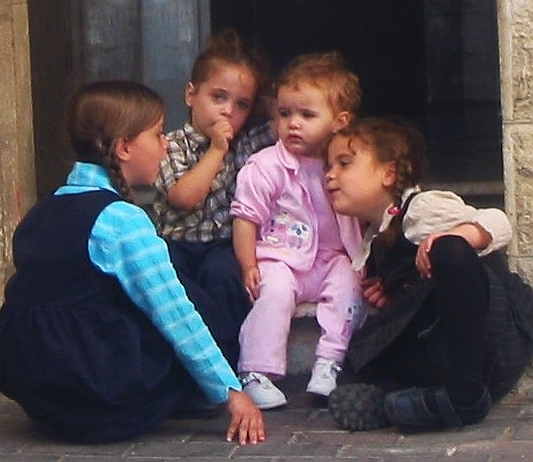
Jewish Orthodox children in Jerusalem

Jerusalem's population size and composition has shifted many times over its 5,000 year history.

Most population data pre-1905 is based on estimates, often from foreign travellers or organisations, since previous census data usually covered wider areas such as the Jerusalem District. These estimates suggest that since the end of the Crusades, Muslims formed the largest group in Jerusalem until the mid-19th century. Between 1838 and 1876, a number of estimates exist which conflict as to whether Jews or Muslims were the largest group during this period, and between 1882 and 1922 estimates conflict as to exactly when Jews became a majority of the population.

In 2020, the population was 951,100, of which Jews comprised 570,100 (59.9%), Muslims 353.800 (37.2%), Christians 16.300 (1.7%), and 10,800 unclassified (1.1%).

== Overview ==
Jerusalemites are of varied national, ethnic and religious denominations and include European, Asian and African Jews, Arabs of Sunni Shafi'i Muslim, Melkite Orthodox, Melkite Catholic, Latin Catholic, and Protestant backgrounds, Armenians of the Armenian Orthodox and Armenian Catholic, Assyrians largely of the Syriac Orthodox Church and Syriac Catholic Church, Maronites, and Copts. Many of these groups were once immigrants or pilgrims that have over time become near-indigenous populations and claim the importance of Jerusalem to their faith as their reason for moving to and being in the city.

Jerusalem's long history of conquests by competing and different powers has resulted in different groups living in the city many of whom have never fully identified or assimilated with a particular power, despite the length of their rule. Though they may have been citizens of that particular kingdom and empire and involved with civic activities and duties, these groups often saw themselves as distinct national groups (see Armenians, for example). The Ottoman millet system, whereby minorities in the Ottoman Empire were given the authority to govern themselves within the framework of the broader system, allowed these groups to retain autonomy and remain separate from other religious and national groups. Some Palestinian residents of the city prefer to use the term Maqdisi or Qudsi as a Palestinian demonym.

== Historical population by religion ==
The tables below provide data on demographic change over time in Jerusalem, with an emphasis on the Jewish population. Readers should be aware that the boundaries of Jerusalem have changed many times over the years and that Jerusalem may also refer to a district or even a subdistrict under Ottoman, British, or Israeli administration, see e.g. Jerusalem District. Thus, year-to-year comparisons may not be valid due to the varying geographic areas covered by the population censuses.

=== Persian period ===
The population of Jerusalem during Persian rule in Judea (province of Yehud Medinata) is estimated at between 1,500 and 2,750.

=== 1st century Judea ===
During the First Jewish–Roman War (66–73 CE), the population of Jerusalem was estimated at 600,000 persons by Roman historian Tacitus, while Josephus estimated that there were as many as 1,100,000 who were killed in the war—though this number included people who did not belong to the city itself. Josephus also wrote that 97,000 Jews were sold as slaves. After the Roman victory over the Jews, as many as 115,880 dead bodies were carried out through one gate between the months of Nisan and Tammuz.

Modern estimates of Jerusalem's population during the final Roman Siege of Jerusalem in 70 (CE) are variously 70,398 by Wilkinson in 1974, 80,000 by Broshi in 1978, and 60,000–70,000 by Levine in 2002. According to Josephus, the populations of adult male scholarly sects were as follows: over 6,000 Pharisees, more than 4,000 Essenes and "a few" Sadducees. New Testament scholar Cousland notes that "recent estimates of the population of Jerusalem suggest something in the neighbourhood of a hundred thousand". A minimalist view is taken by Hillel Geva, who estimates from archaeological evidence that the population of Jerusalem before its 70 CE destruction was at most 20,000.

=== Middle Ages ===
Al-Maqdisi, a 10th-century native of Jerusalem writing prior to the crusades, reports that "everywhere the Christians and Jews have the upper hand and the mosque is void of congregation".

Under Crusader rule, the Jewish presence in Jerusalem was nearly eradicated. Following the city's conquest in 1099, many Jews were killed, and those who survived were expelled. Baldwin I of Jerusalem (r. 1100–1118) formally reinstated the prohibition on Jewish settlement in the city. As a result, Jewish life in Jerusalem came to a near standstill during the 12th century. Based on contemporary Jewish travelers, including Benjamin of Tudela and Petachiah of Regensburg, by the 12th century, there were almost no Jews remaining in the city. Some survivors resettled in nearby cities such as Ascalon, which temporarily became a refuge for displaced Jewish communities.

After Saladin's reconquest of Jerusalem in 1187, a small Jewish community re-emerged, consisting of local, Maghrebi, and "Frankish" Jews. However, the destruction of Jerusalem’s walls in 1219 by Al-Mu'azzam Isa led to a new wave of Jewish flight, with many fleeing to Acre. A brief ban on Jewish residence returned when Frederick II took control in 1229, lasting until the city’s recovery in the mid-13th century. Under the Mamluks, the city remained relatively isolated, limiting Jewish resettlement to a small number of households primarily in shared neighborhoods with Christians.

Year	Jews	Muslims	Christians	Total	Original source	As quoted in
c. 1130	0	0	30,000	30,000	?	Runciman
1267	2*	?	?	?	Nahmanides, Jewish scholar	
1471	250*	?	?	?	?	Baron
1488	76*	?	?	?	?	Baron
1489	200*	?	?	?	?	Yaari, 1943

* Indicates families.

=== Early Ottoman era ===
Year	Jews	Muslims	Christians	Total	Original source	As quoted in
1525–1526	1,194	3,704	714	5,612	Ottoman taxation registers*	Cohen and Lewis
1538–1539	1,363	7,287	884	9,534	Ottoman taxation registers*	Cohen and Lewis
1553–1554	1,958	12,154	1,956	16,068	Ottoman taxation registers*	Cohen and Lewis
1596–1597	?	8,740	252	?	Ottoman taxation registers*	Cohen and Lewis
1723	2,000	?	?	?	Van Egmont & Heyman, Christian travellers	

=== Modern era ===
==== Muslim "relative majority" ====
Henry Light, who visited Jerusalem in 1814, reported that Muslims comprised the largest portion of the 12,000-person population, but that Jews made the greatest single sect. In 1818, Robert Richardson, family doctor to the Earl of Belmore, estimated the number of Jews to be 10,000, twice the number of Muslims.

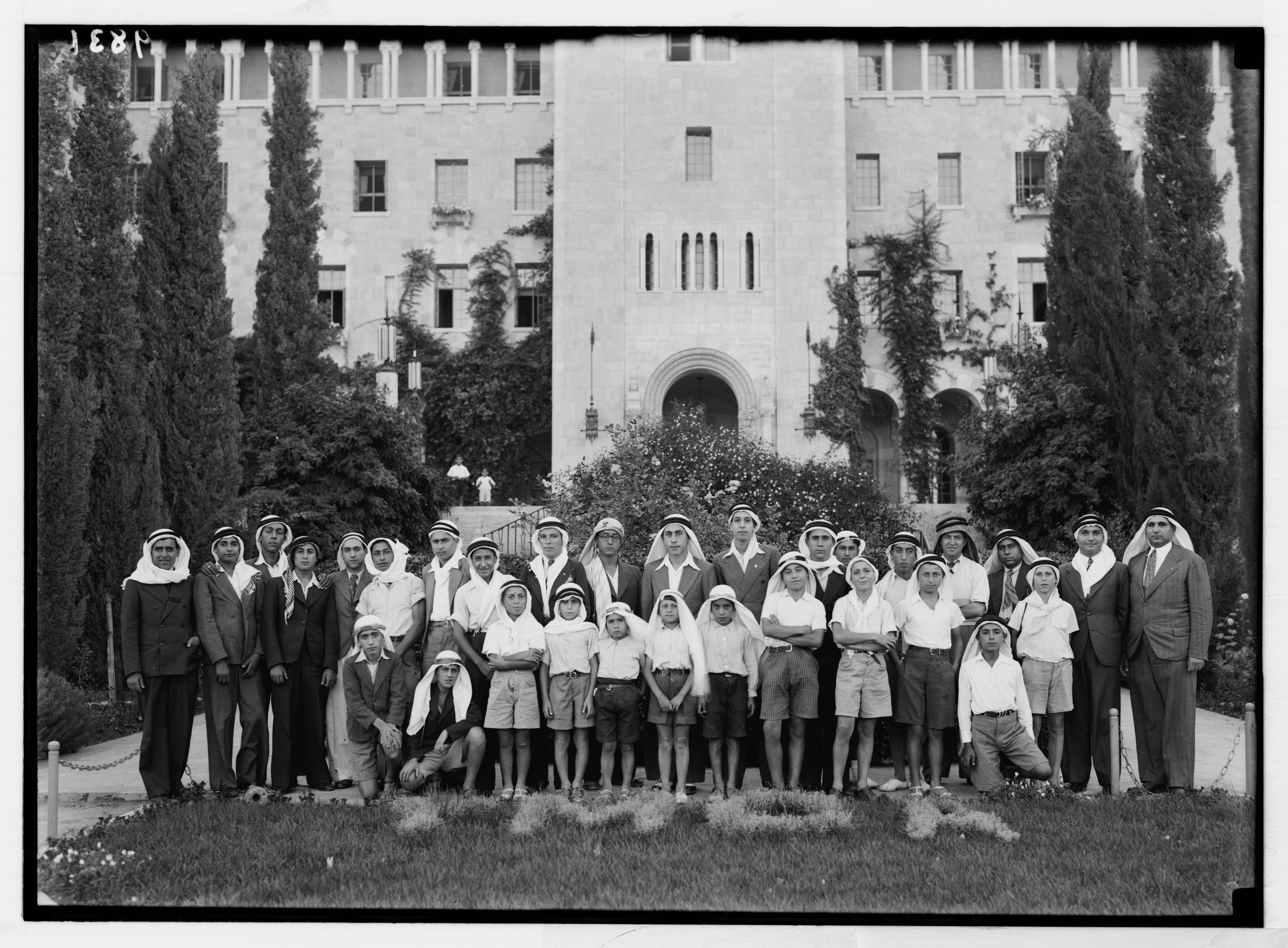
Arab boys at Jerusalem YMCA, 1938

Year	Jews	Muslims	Christians	Total	Original source	As quoted in
1806	2,000	4,000	2,774	8,774	Ulrich Jasper Seetzen, Frisian explorer	Sharkansky, 1996
1815	4,000–5,000	?	?	26,000	William Turner	Kark and Oren-Nordheim, 2001
1817	3,000–4,000	13,000	3,250	19,750	Thomas R. Joliffe	
1821		>4,000		8,000	James Silk Buckingham	
1824	6,000	10,000	4,000	20,000	Fisk and King, Writers	
1832	4,000	13,000	3,560	20,560	Ferdinand de Géramb, French monk	Kark and Oren-Nordheim, 2001

==== Muslim or Jewish "relative majority" ====
Between 1838 and 1876, conflicting estimates exist regarding whether Muslims or Jews constituted a "relative majority" (or plurality) in the city.

Writing in 1841, the biblical scholar Edward Robinson noted the conflicting demographic estimates regarding Jerusalem during the period, stating in reference to an 1839 estimate attributed to the Moses Montefiore: "As to the Jews, the enumeration in question was made out by themselves, in the expectation of receiving a certain amount of alms for every name returned. It is therefore obvious that they here had as strong a motive to exaggerate their number, as they often have in other circumstances to underrate it. Besides, this number of 7000 rests merely on report; Sir Moses himself has published nothing on the subject; nor could his agent in London afford me any information so late as Nov. 1840." In 1843, Reverend F.C. Ewald, a Christian traveler visiting Jerusalem, reported an influx of 150 Jews from Algiers. He wrote that there were now a large number of Jews from the coast of Africa who were forming a separate congregation.

From the mid-1850s, following the Crimean War, the expansion of Jerusalem outside of the Old City began, with institutions including the Russian Compound, Kerem Avraham, the Schneller Orphanage, Bishop Gobat school, and the Mishkenot Sha'ananim, events that marked the beginning of permanent settlement outside Jerusalem's Old City walls.

Between 1856 and 1880, Jewish immigration to Palestine more than doubled, with the majority settling in Jerusalem. The majority of these immigrants were Ashkenazi Jews from Eastern Europe, who subsisted on Halukka.

Year	Jews	Muslims	Christians	Total	Original source	As quoted in
1838	3,000	4,500	3,500	11,000	Edward Robinson	Edward Robinson, 1841
1844	7,120	5,000	3,390	15,510	Ernst-Gustav Schultz, Prussian consul	
1845	7,500	15,000	10,000	32,000+	Joseph Schwarz	
1846	7,515	6,100	3,558	17,173	Titus Tobler, Swiss explorer	Kark and Oren-Nordheim, 2001
1847	10,000	25,000	10,000	45,000	French consul estimates	Alexander Schölch, 1985
1849	895	3,074	1,872	5,841	Official Ottoman census obtained by the Prussian consul Georg Rosen, showing male subjects	Alexander Schölch, 1985
1849	2,084	?	?	?	Moses Montefiore census, showing number of Jewish families	
1850	13,860	?	?	?	Dr. Ascher, Anglo-Jewish Association	
1851	5,580	12,286	7,488	25,354	Official census (only Ottoman citizens)	Kark and Oren-Nordheim, 2001
1853	8,000	4,000	3,490	15,490	César Famin, French diplomat	Famin
1856	5,700	9,300	3,000	18,000	Ludwig August von Frankl, Austrian writer	Kark and Oren-Nordheim, 2001
1857	7,000	?	?	10–15,000	HaMaggid periodical	Kark and Oren-Nordheim, 2001
1862	8,000	6,000	3,800	17,800	HaCarmel periodical	Kark and Oren-Nordheim, 2001
1864	8,000	4,500	2,500	15,000	British consulate	Dore Gold, 2009
1866	8,000	4,000	4,000	16,000	John Murray travel guidebook	Kark and Oren-Nordheim, 2001
1867	?	?	?	14,000	Mark Twain, The Innocents Abroad, Chapter 52	
1867	4,000– 5,000	6,000	?	?	Ellen-Clare Miller, Missionary	
1869	3,200*	n/a	n/a	n/a	Rabbi H. J. Sneersohn	New York Times
1869	9,000	5,000	4,000	18,000	Hebrew Christian Mutual Aid Society	
1869	7,977	7,500	5,373	20,850	Liévin de Hamme, Franciscan missionary	Kark and Oren-Nordheim, 2001
1871	4,000	13,000	7,000	24,000	Karl Baedeker travel guidebook	Kark and Oren-Nordheim, 2001
1872	3,780	6,150	4,428	14,358	Ottoman salname (official annals) for 1871–72	Alexander Schölch, 1985
1874	10,000	5,000	5,500	20,500	British consul in Jerusalem report to the House of Commons	Parliamentary Papers
1876	13,000	15,000	8,000	36,000	Bernhard Neumann	Kark and Oren-Nordheim, 2001

==== Jews as absolute or relative majority ====
Published in 1883, the PEF Survey of Palestine volume which covered the region noted that "The number of the Jews has of late increased at the rate of 1,000 to 1,500 per annum. Since 1875 the population of Jerusalem has rapidly increased. The number of Jews is now estimated at 15,000 to 20,000, and the population, including the inhabitants of the new suburbs, reaches a total of about 40,000 souls."

In 1881–82, a group of Jews arrived from Yemen as a result of messianic fervor, in the phase known as the First Aliyah. After living in the Old City for several years, they moved to the hills facing the City of David, where they lived in caves. In 1884, the community, numbering 200, moved to new stone houses built for them by a Jewish charity.

The Jewish population of Jerusalem, as for wider Palestine, increased further during the Third Aliyah of 1919–23 following the Balfour Declaration. Prior to this, a British survey in 1919 noted that most Jews in Jerusalem were largely Orthodox and that a minority were Zionists.

Year	Jews	Muslims	Christians	Total	Original source	As quoted in
1882	9,000	7,000	5,000	21,000	Wilson	Kark and Oren-Nordheim, 2001
1883	15,000–20,000	?	?	40,000	PEF Survey of Palestine	PEF Survey of Palestine
1885	15,000	6,000	14,000	35,000	Goldmann	Kark and Oren-Nordheim, 2001
1889	25,000	14,000	?	>39,000	Gilbert	Martin Gilbert, 2008
1893	>50%	?	?	~40,000	Albert Shaw, Writer	Shaw, 1894
1896	28,112	8,560	8,748	45,420	Calendar of Palestine for the year 5656	Harrel and Stendel, 1974
1905	13,300	11,000	8,100	32,400	1905 Ottoman census (only Ottoman citizens)	U.O.Schmelz
1922	33,971	13,413	14,669	62,578	Census of Palestine (British)	Harrel and Stendel, 1974
1931	51,200	19,900	19,300	90,053	Census of Palestine (British)	Harrel and Stendel, 1974
1944	97,000	30,600	29,400	157,000	?	Harrel and Stendel, 1974
1967	195,700	54,963	12,646	263,307		Harrel, 1974

=== After Jerusalem Law ===
Year	Jews	Muslims	Christians	Total	Proportion of Jewish residents	Original source
1980	292,300	?	?	407,100	71.8%	Jerusalem Municipality
1985	327,700	?	?	457,700	71.6%	Jerusalem Municipality
1987	340,000	121,000	14,000	475,000	71.6%	Jerusalem Municipality
1988	353,800	125,200	14,400	493,500	71.7%	Jerusalem Municipality
1990	378,200	131,800	14,400	524,400	72.1%	Jerusalem Municipality
1995	417,100	182,700	14,100	617,000	67.6%	Jerusalem Municipality
1996	421,200	?	?	602,100	70.0%	Jerusalem Municipality
2000	448,800	?	?	657,500	68.3%	Jerusalem Municipality
2004	464,500	?	?	693,200	67.0%	Jerusalem Municipality
2005	469,300	?	?	706,400	66.4%	Jerusalem Municipality
2007	489,480	?	?	746,300	65.6%	Jerusalem Municipality
2011	497,000	281,000	14,000	801,000	62.0%	Israel Central Bureau of Statistics
2015	524,700	307,300	12,400	857,800	61.2%	Israel Central Bureau of Statistics
2016	536,600	319,800	15,800	882,700	60.8%	Israel Central Bureau of Statistics
2017	546,100	328,600	15,900	901,300	60.6%	Jerusalem Institute for Policy Research
2018	555,800	336,700	16,000	919,400	60.5%	Jerusalem Institute for Policy Research
2019	563,200	345,800	16,200	936,400	60.1%	Jerusalem Institute for Policy Research
2020	570,100	353,800	16,300	951,100	59.9%	Jerusalem Institute for Policy Research

These official Israeli statistics refer to the expanded Israel municipality of Jerusalem. This includes not only the area of the pre-1967 Israeli and Jordanian municipalities, but also outlying Palestinian villages and neighbourhoods east of the city, which were not part of Jordanian East Jerusalem prior to 1967. Demographic data from 1967 to 2012 showed continues growth of Arab population, both in relative and absolute numbers, and the declining of Jewish population share in the overall population of the city. In 1967, Jews were 73.4% of city population, while in 2010 the Jewish population shrank to 64%. In the same period the Arab population increased from 26,5% in 1967 to 36% in 2010. In 1999, the Jewish total fertility rate was 3.8 children per woman, while the Palestinian rate was 4.4. This led to concerns that Arabs would eventually become a majority of the city's population.

Between 1999 and 2010, the demographic trends reversed themselves, with the Jewish fertility rate increasing and the Arab rate decreasing. In addition, the number of Jewish immigrants from abroad choosing to settle in Jerusalem steadily increased. By 2010, there was a higher Jewish than Arab growth rate. That year, the city's birth rate was placed at 4.2 children for Jewish mothers, compared with 3.9 children for Arab mothers. In addition, 2,250 Jewish immigrants from abroad settled in Jerusalem. The Jewish fertility rate is believed to be still currently increasing, while the Arab fertility rate remains on the decline.

== See also ==
- Demographics of Jerusalem by quarter
- Demographic history of Palestine (region)
- History of Jerusalem
- List of people from Jerusalem
