= Hani Bahjat Tabbara =

Jordanian diplomat

- هاني بهجت طبـاره

Jordanian Ambassador to Morocco
- In office 1977–1980

Jordanian Ambassador to Romania
- In office 1980–1982
- Preceded by: Marwan Dudin
- Succeeded by: Yasin Istambuli

Jordanian Ambassador to Saudi Arabia
- In office 1982–1984
- Preceded by: Naser Ed-din Al-Assad
- Succeeded by: Mohammad Rasul Kailani

Jordanian Ambassador to the United Kingdom
- In office March 12, 1984 to – 1986
- Preceded by: Taher al-Masri
- Succeeded by: Albert Jamil Butros

Jordanian Ambassador to Turkey
- In office 1987 – September 1, 1988
- Preceded by: Walid Muhammed Sadi
- Succeeded by: Marouf al-Bakhit

Jordanian Ambassador to the German Democratic Republic
- In office September 1, 1988 – October 3, 1990
- Preceded by: Marwan Dudin

Jordanian Ambassador to Australia
- In office 1994–2002
- Preceded by: Saad Bataini
- Succeeded by: Khaldoun Tharwat Talhouni

Personal details
- Born: 1939 (age 86–87)
- Spouse: Wafa
- Children: 2 sons
- Education: University of Alexandria

Hani Bahjat Tabbara (born 1939) is a Jordanian retired diplomat.

== Career ==
In 1963, he joined the Jordanian government service.

From 1971 to 1973, he served as the Counselor at the embassy in London. From 1973 to 1976, he served as the Minister Plenipotentiary in London. From 1977 to 1980, he served as the ambassador in Rabat.

From 1980 to 1982, he served as the ambassador in Bucharest (Romania). On March 26, 1981 he served as concurrently accredited in East Berlin. From 1982 to 1984, he served as the ambassador in Riyadh (Saudi Arabia). From March 12, 1984 to 1986, he served as the ambassador in London. From 1987 to September 1, 1988, he served as the ambassador in Ankara (Turkey). From September 1, 1988 to October 3, 1990 he served as the ambassador in Berlin (East Germany)

From 1994 to June 23, 1998, he served as the ambassador in Canberra. From 1999 to 2001, he served as the Inspector General of Ministry of Foreign Affairs.

From 2001 to 2003, he served as the Secretary General of the Ministry of Foreign Affairs. From 2003 to 2005, he served as appointed a member of the Senate.
