= Rape in Islamic law =

Sexual violation as interpreted in Islamic theological jurisprudence

Rape in Islamic law (Sharia) is a violation of moral and divine law. Islam divides claims of sexual violation into 'divine rights' (huquq Allah) and 'interpersonal rights' (huquq al-'ibad): the former requiring divine punishment (hadd penalties) and the latter belonging to the more flexible human realm.

Rape can be defined as: "Forcible illegal sexual intercourse by a man with a woman who is not legally married to him, without her free will and consent". The terms ghasaba and ightasaba have been used by traditional jurists when discussing sexual assault and its punishment. Most jurists hold that rape is committing zinā by force, hence rape is known as zinā bī al-ikrāh (Arabic: زنا بالإكراه). Al-Shāfi'ī defined rape as: "Forcing a woman to commit zinā against her will". To the Hanafis, illegal intercourse is considered rape when there is no consent and no deliberate action from the victim. In the Māliki view, rape refers to any kind of unlawful sexual intercourse (zina) by usurpation and without consent. This includes instances when the condition of the victims prevents them from expressing their resistance, such as insanity and sleep. The Hanbalites, similar to the Mālikites, consider the use of any kind of force as a denial of consent from the victim. The threat of starvation or suffering the cold of winter are also regarded as against one's will. However, distinctions were made between rape and Zina (adultery).

In the case of rape, the adult male perpetrator (i.e. rapist) of such an act is to receive the ḥadd zinā, but the non-consenting or invalidly consenting female (i.e. rape victim) is to be regarded as innocent of zinā and relieved of the ḥadd punishment. According to Professor Oliver Leaman, the required testimony of four male witnesses having witnessed the actual penetration applies to illicit sexual relations (i.e. adultery and fornication), not to rape.

Rape charges can be brought and a case proven, based on the sole testimony of the victim, providing that circumstantial evidence supports the allegations. ..... It (requirements for proof of rape as zina) happens either due to misinterpretation of the intricacies of the Sharia laws governing these matters, or cultural traditions; or due to corruption and blatant disregard of the law, or indeed some combination of these phenomena.

In Islamic fiqh rape is also called Zina Al-Zibr or Ightisab. According to some interpretations it falls under the rules of hirabah (piracy or unlawful warfare). Classical Islamic law (Shari'a) regarded the crime of sexual violation as a coercive zina, and therefore a hudud offence.

== Islamic sources ==
An incident during the time of the Islamic prophet Muhammad formed the basis of later jurisprudence of rape:

When a woman went out in the time of the Prophet for prayer, a man attacked her and overpowered (raped) her. She shouted and he went off, and when a man came by, she said: That (man) did such and such to me. And when a company of the Emigrants came by, she said: That man did such and such to me. They went and seized the man whom they thought had had intercourse with her and brought him to her. She said: Yes, this is he. Then they brought him to the Messenger of Allah. When he (the Prophet) was about to pass sentence, the man who (actually) had assaulted her stood up and said: Messenger of Allah, I am the man who did it to her. He (the Prophet) said to her: Go away, for Allah has forgiven you. But he told the man some good words (Abu Dawud said: meaning the man who was seized), and of the man who had had intercourse with her, he said: Stone him to death. He also said: He has repented to such an extent that if the people of Medina had repented similarly, it would have been accepted from them.

— Sunan Abi Dawud 4379

== Traditional fiqh ==
The terms ghasaba and ightasaba have been used by traditional jurists when discussing sexual assault and its punishment. Most jurists hold that rape is committing zinā by force, hence rape is known as zinā bī al-ikrāh (Arabic: زنا بالإكراه). Al-Shāfi'ī defined rape as: "Forcing a woman to commit zinā against her will". To the Ḥanafis, illegal intercourse is considered rape when there is no consent and no deliberate action from the victim. In Mālik's view, rape refers to any kind of unlawful sexual intercourse (zina) by usurpation and without consent. This includes instances when the condition of the victims prevents them from expressing their resistance, such as insanity, sleep or being under age. The Hanbalites, similar to the Mālikites, consider the use of any kind of force as a denial of consent from the victim. The threat of starvation or suffering the cold of winter are also regarded as against one's will.

Rape is considered a crime in Islam. In Islam, rape is called Zina Al-Zibr or Ightisab, and it falls under the rules of Hirabah. Classical Islamic law (Shari'a) regarded the crime of sexual violation as a coercive zina, and therefore a hadd offence. There is a lack of recognition of marital rape among certain jurists and scholars.

Jurists agree that a woman who has been subject to force and raped is not liable to any punishment.

=== Analogy to adultery ===
Classical Islamic law defined what today is commonly called "rape" as a coercive form of fornication or adultery (zina).

This basic definition of rape as "coercive zināʾ" meant that all the normal legal principles that pertained to zināʾ – its definition, punishment, and establishment through evidence – were also applicable to rape; the prototypical act of zināʾ was defined as sexual intercourse between a man and a woman over whom the man has neither a conjugal nor an ownership right.

What distinguished a prototypical act of zināʾ from an act of rape, for the jurists, was that in the prototypical case, both parties act out of their own volition, while in an act of rape, only one of the parties does so. Jurists admitted a wide array of situations as being "coercive" in nature, including the application of physical force, the presence of duress, or the threat of future harm either to oneself or those close to oneself; they also included in their definition of "coercion" the inability to give valid consent, as in the case of minors, or mentally ill or unconscious persons. Muslim jurists from the earliest period of Islamic law agreed that perpetrators of coercive zināʾ should receive the ḥadd punishment normally applicable to their personal status and sexual status, but that the ḥadd punishment should not be applied to victims of coercive or nonconsensual zināʾ due to their reduced capacity.

The crime of rape, according to Sunni Ḥanafī and Mālikī jurists, is as an act of zinā. If the consent was granted under coercion or in a defective legal capacity such as by a mentally impaired person, it is considered non-consent or invalid consent.

=== Analogy with hirabah ===
The inclusion of rape within the purview of hirabah has had support throughout Islamic history.

The medieval Zahiri jurist Ibn Hazm defined hirabah as,

'One who puts people in fear on the road, whether or not with a weapon, at night or day, in urban areas or in open spaces, in the palace of a caliph or a mosque, with or without accomplices, in the desert or in the village, in a large or small city, with one or more people… making people fear that they'll be killed, or have money taken, or be raped (hatk al 'arad)… whether the attackers are one or many.'

It had significant support from the Maliki jurists.

Al-Dasuqi, for example, a Maliki jurist, held that if a person forced a woman to have sex, his actions would be deemed committing hiraba. In addition, the Maliki judge Ibn 'Arabi, relates a story in which a group was attacked and a woman in their party raped. Responding to the argument that the crime did not constitute hiraba because no money was taken and no weapons used, Ibn 'Arabi replied indignantly that "hirabah with the private parts" is much worse than hiraba involving the taking of money, and that anyone would rather be subjected to the latter than the former.

In the Hanafi school of law, the term zina is taken to refer to illegal sexual intercourse, where rape is distinguished as zina bil jabr to indicate its forced and non-consensual nature whereas fornication and adultery fit zina bil ridha, which indicates consent. Though the terminology uses the term zina, nonetheless, they are two categorically different crimes as rape is treated as a tazeer (discretionary) crime by the judge and prosecuted based on circumstantial evidence (medical evidence, any number of witnesses, and other forensic evidence). It is fornication and adultery by mutual consent, or zina bil ridha, which retain their classical hadd punishments from the Qur'an and sunnah provided there are four witnesses (absent which they too default to tazeer, subject to discretionary punishments such as fining, imprisonment, or lashes). Nonetheless, gang rape or public rape, such as the sort that occurs during war, is still traditionally considered hirabah as that is more in line with its classical definition as a war crime or crime against civilization and society.

== Prosecution of rape ==
Caliph Umar accepted the testimony of a single individual who heard the rape victim call for help as evidence that rape occurred. Imam Malik accepted physical injuries on the victim as evidence that rape occurred. If a woman claims to have been raped or sexually abused under duress, she will be acquitted of adultery in light of Qur'anic verse 24:33, which states that a woman has not sinned when compelled to commit this crime.

According to Professor Oliver Leaman, the required testimony of four male witnesses who eyewitnessed the actual penetration applies only to consensual illicit sexual relations (whether adultery or fornication), not to the non-consensual crime of rape. The role of the four male witnesses is to testify that they eyewitnessed not only an illicit sexual encounter, but to testify also that the participants consensually partook in it.

The requirements for proof of rape, by contrast, are less stringent, and do not require any extraneous witness testimony, eyewitness or otherwise:

Rape charges can be brought and a case proven based on the sole testimony of the victim, providing that circumstantial evidence supports the allegations. It is these strict criteria of proof which lead to the frequent observation that where injustice against women does occur, it is not because of Islamic law. It happens either due to misinterpretation of the intricacies of the Sharia laws governing these matters, or cultural traditions; or due to corruption and blatant disregard of the law, or indeed some combination of these phenomena.

== Punishment ==
Classical jurisprudence, regards sexual violation as a violation of moral and divine law, divides claims of sexual violation into 'divine rights' (huquq Allah) and 'interpersonal rights' (huquq al-'ibad): while the former requiring divine punishment (hadd penalties) and the latter belonging to the more flexible human realm.

Rape is punishable in some circumstances by the ḥadd of zinā as well as in some circumstances by the ḥadd of ḥirābah and it is also complemented by ta'zīr. Muslim jurists agreed that the punishment would not be averted even if the perpetrator claimed to be ignorant of the law. This is because of the immorality of the crime of rape and the severe harm it causes the victim.

=== Punishment as zinā ===
Most classical scholars argued for applying the ḥadd penalty for zinā to a convicted rapist, which is stoning to death for the married (muḥsān), or a flogging of 100 lashes and deportation for the unmarried (ghair-muḥsān). They base their argument on a hadith which reports a rape case at the time of the Prophet, where the victim was excused and her rapist (who was married) was sentenced to be stoned to death.

=== Punishment as Ḥirābah ===
Certain classical jurists (Al-Tabari and the Maliki Ibn al-'Arabi) and more modern interpretations (The Religious Council of Egypt among others) have classified the crime of rape not as a subcategory of zinā, but rather a different crime of violence under hirabah (banditary), i.e. a violent crime causing disorder in the land in the manner described in the Qur'an (5:33) as 'fasad' (destructive mischief). A similar crime, for example, would be highway robbery, as it puts fear in people going out or losing their property through violence. Thus, the rapist will be considered to be under the category of people who are outlaws and a danger towards the peace and security of the society.

=== Punishment as Ta'zīr ===
Scholars maintain that offenders be allotted a ta'zir penalty upon the discretion of the authorities. To them, rape deserves a ta'zīr penalty when a conviction is reached as a result of circumstantial evidence, such as marks of violence about the genitals, marks of violence on the body of the victim or accused, the presence of semen or blood-stains on the body or clothes of the victim or accused, or a medical report, all of which are sufficient for ta'zīr only. Under the principle of al-fi'l al-darr (Islamic law of Tort), it is possible for a victim to make a claim for moral damages, which may include violation of a person's freedom, dignity, reputation, social or financial status.

According to an 11th Century Islamic scholar, Imam Ibn 'Abd al-Barr has noted an ijma (The agreement of the Islamic scholars and ulama) on this issue and states,

'"The scholars are in unanimous agreement that the rapist is to be subjected to the ḥadd punishment if there is bayyinah (four witnesses) against him, which would warrant the ḥadd punishment to be imposed. [The imposition of the ḥadd punishment would also apply] if the accused rapist admits to his crime himself. In a situation where the above two instances do not apply, then [according to the other evidence that may be brought against him] he would have to bear aqoobah [taʿzīr]."

==== Financial compensation ====
According to the Mālikī, Ḥanbalī, and Shāfiʾī schools of law, the rape of a free woman consisted of not one but two violations: a violation against a "right of God" (ḥaqq Allāh), provoking the ḥadd punishment; and a violation against a "human" (interpersonal) right (ḥaqq ādamī), requiring a monetary compensation. These jurists saw the free woman, in her proprietorship over her own sexuality (buḍʾ), as not unlike the slave-owner who owns the sexuality of his female slave, a man having the right to sexual intercourse with his female slave. For them, in the same way that the slave owner was entitled to compensation for sexual misappropriation, the free woman was also entitled to compensation. The amount of this compensation, they reasoned, should be the amount that any man would normally pay for sexual access to the woman in question – that is, the amount of her dower (ṣadāq or mahr).

== Related issues ==
=== Marital rape ===
Islamic law has historically handled marital rape differently from modern laws due to the fact that "sexual consent" is a modern concept and Islamic law was formulated in the pre-modern era. Rather than being a violation of consent, sexual abuse within marriage was conceptualized as harm inflicted on the wife, and judges used the harm-reduction principle when judging these cases.

Historical records show that when experiencing sexual abuse, some women were able to go to court and force their husbands to desist and pay damages even in the pre-modern Muslim world. For example, perineal tearing by the husband was criminalized and entitled the wife to monetary compensation. Marital rape could also be classified as act of aggression against the wife and lead to the prosecution of the husband and the wife obtaining divorce, but the punishments were not as severe as they are against other forms of rape.

Medieval jurists classified rape under the crime of ightisab, but no medieval jurist classified marital rape as such. The term ightisab refers to "usurping something that belongs to another by force and against the person's will"; it denotes something "ugly" and "reprehensible". Nevertheless, some medieval jurists made a distinction between forced and consensual sex within marriage. While the majority of Islamic jurists do not recognize marital rape as rape, some modern interpretations of Islamic law prohibit marital rape in other ways.

According to Dar al-Ifta al-Misriyyah, Islamic scholars condemn when a husband uses violence to force his wife to sleep with him or asks his wife to have sexual intercourse during her menstrual period, in an abnormal sexual position, or during fasting hours in Ramadan. In response the wife has the right to take her husband to court and he must be punished for the act. According to this opinion, a wife has numerous grounds to refuse sexual relations with her husband, including if he has a contagious disease or if sexual intercourse hurts her body. Certain observations of Islamic law advise that the sexual intercourse between man and wife should be conducted with intimacy and love.

Some scholars from, the Hanafi school, traditionally allowed the husband to forcibly have sex with his wife if she didn't have a legitimate reason to refuse sex; this is also indicated in the fiqh manual Al-Hidayah. This particular Hanafi position was not prevalent in other schools of thought, who neither authorized forced sex in marriage nor penalized it.

=== Pregnancy due to rape ===
In Islamic law, if a woman becomes pregnant while out of wedlock and denies committing adultery, claiming she was raped by someone, most jurists of the Hanafi, Shafi'i, and Hanbali school of thought suggest that the excuse of such a woman would be accepted without investigation, while the Maliki school of thought requires that a woman provide additional evidence to support such claims, if not, she is subjected to the stipulated punishment.

==== Abortion due to rape ====
When the pregnancy is unplanned and therefore unwanted, as in the case of rape, the parents, [have to/should, as adoption is unlawful] abort the fetus and thus prevent the disgrace that awaits both mother and child [..] the child born of rape, like one born of adultery (walad zina) is a more lowly member of society with regard of the rights he or she is guaranteed and the social status he or she can attain.

Muslim scholars were urged to make exceptions in the 1990s following rapes of Kuwaiti women by Iraqi soldiers (in 1991) and the rape of Bosnian and Albanian women by Serb soldiers. In 1991, the Grand Mufti of Palestine, Ekrima Sa'id Sabri, took a different position than mainstream Muslim scholars. He ruled that Muslim women raped by their enemies during the Kosovo War could take abortifacient medicine, because otherwise the children born to those women might one day fight against Muslims.

=== Self defence ===
A woman who is being forced to commit zina (unlawful sexual activity) is obliged to defend herself and should not give in, even if she kills the one who wants to do that to her. This self-defence is waajib (obligatory), and she is not at fault if she kills the one who wants to force her into zina.

== See also ==
- Zina
- Islamic sexual jurisprudence
- Concubinage in Islam
