= Al-Budeiri =

Al-Budeiri (Arabic: البديري, romanized: al-Budayrī), or simply Budeiri, is a Palestinian surname. Notable people with the name include:

- Fatima al-Budeiri (1923–2009), Palestinian radio broadcaster and curator
- Givara Budeiri (born 1976), Palestinian journalist and reporter
- Kamel al-Budeiri (1882–1923), Palestinian politician and anti-Zionist militant

== See also ==
- Al-Budeiri Library, a private library in Jerusalem
- Bedaria tribe, an Arab tribe in Sudan
