= Dome of al-Khalili =

Islamic building in Al-Aqsa, Jerusalem

Coordinates: 31°46′42.07″N 35°14′05.63″E

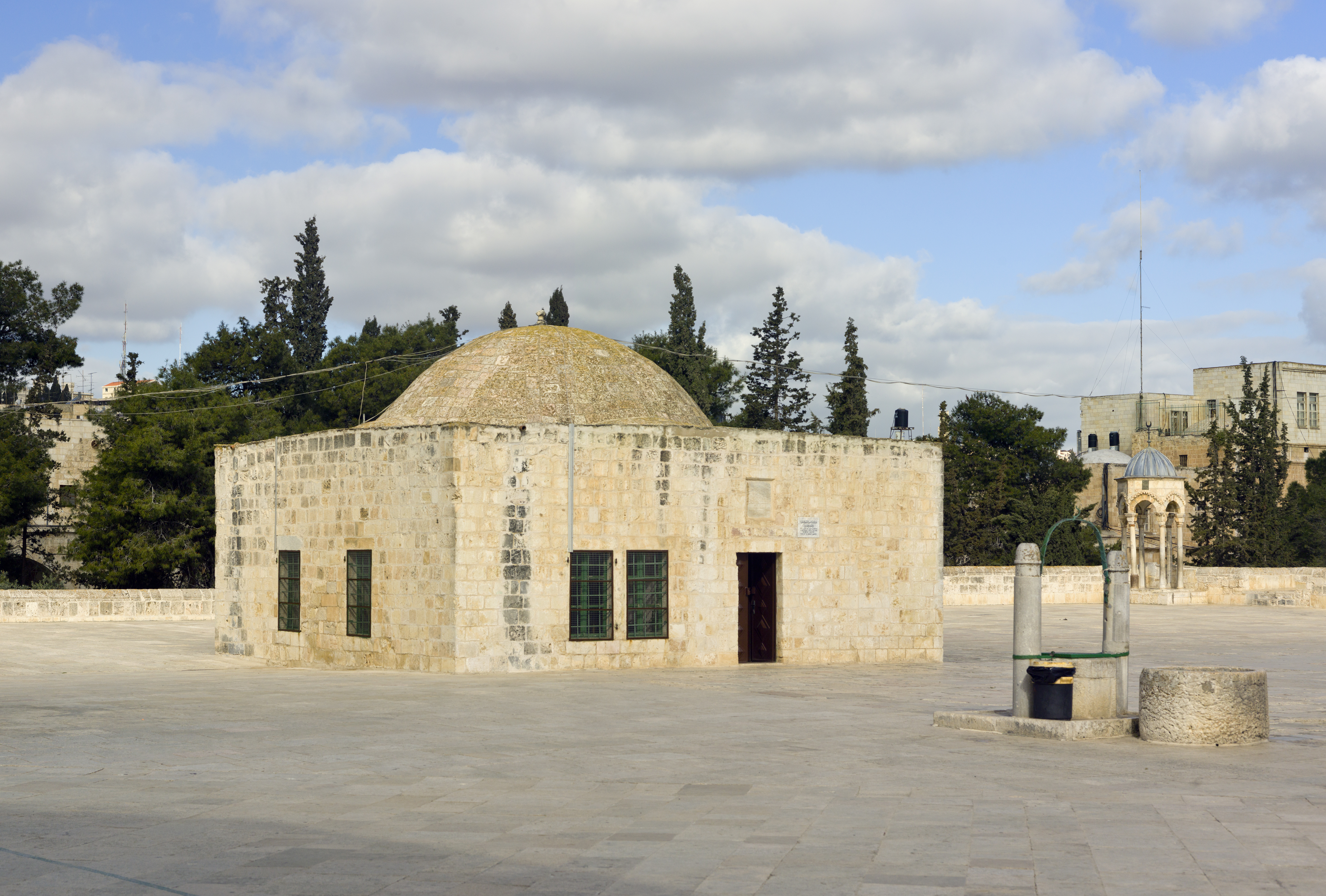
Dome of al-Khalili

The Dome of al-Khalili (Arabic: قبة الخليلي, romanized: Qubbat al-Khalili; Turkish: El-Halili Kubbesi) or the Hebronite is a small domed-building located in the central platform of the Temple Mount (Haram ash-Sharif), north of the Dome of the Rock in the Old City of Jerusalem. The building is made of bricks which are currently tarnished. The Dome of al-Khalili was built in the early 18th century during Ottoman rule of Palestine in dedication to Shaykh Muhammad al-Khalili, a scholar of fiqh who died in 1734.
