= Menachem Lewin =

Israeli chemist

- מנחם לוין
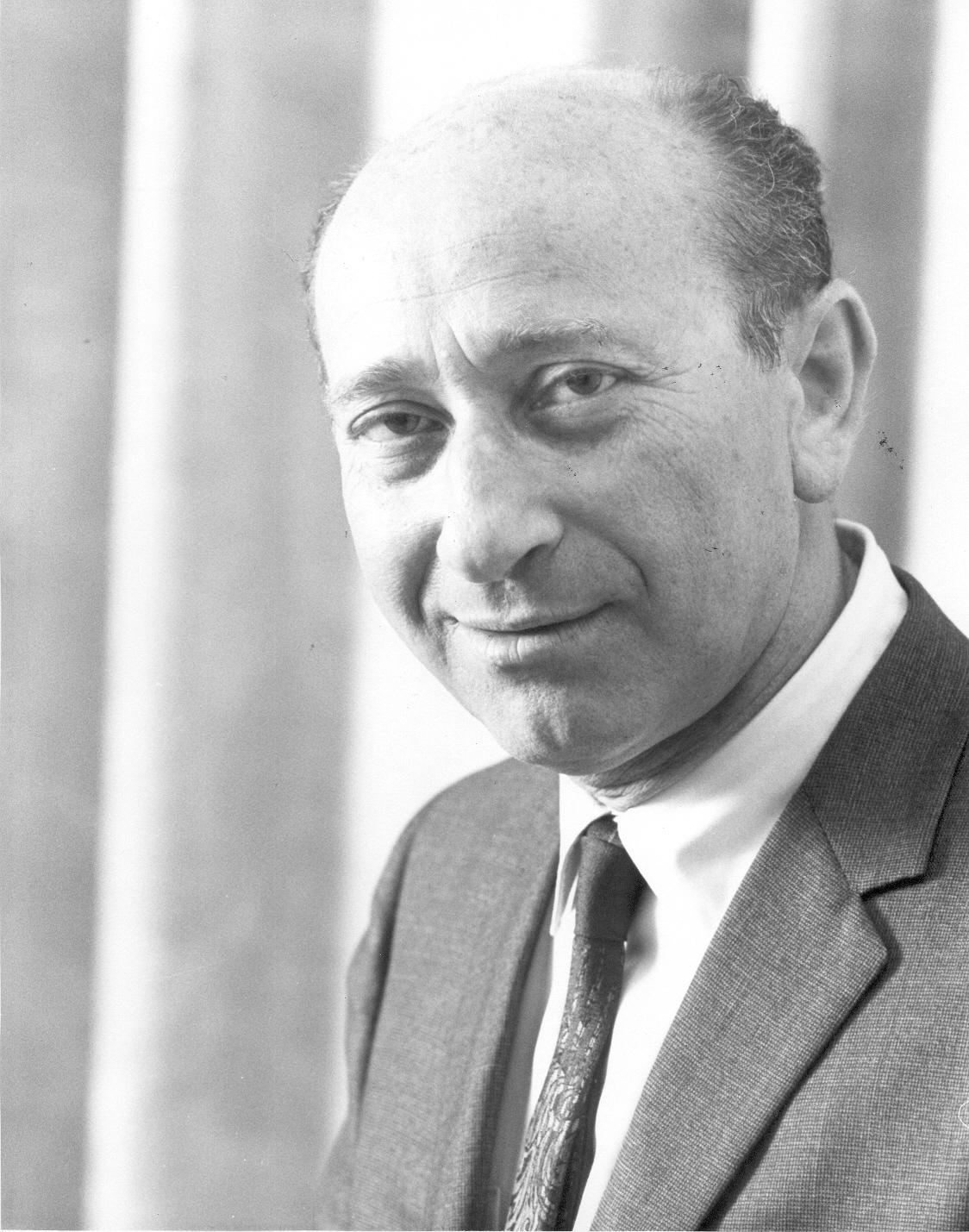
- Prof. Menachem Lewin
- Born: 26 March 1918; Sokoly, Poland
- Died: 18 February 2011 (aged 92); Jerusalem, Israel
- Occupation: Chemist
- Spouse: Ester Rachel Lewin
- Children: Dorit Dinur, Dr. Yitzchac Lewin, and Dr. Yehudit Weisinger
- Awards: Geneva University Habif Award for outstanding cellulose research (1959), Honorary Citizenship of the City of Jerusalem (1993), Founders Award of the International Fiber Society (2005)

Menachem Lewin (Hebrew: מנחם לוין; 26 March 1918 – 18 February 2011) was an Israeli chemist. Lewin worked in polymer, fiber and nanotechnology research. Until his death, a month before his 93rd birthday, Lewin was in charge of a research program at the Polytechnic Institute of New York University. In 2009, he was appointed as editor-in-chief of the Encyclopedia on Fiber science and Engineering, to be published by Wiley in New York. Lewin obtained 29 U.S. and European patents and published 175 peer-reviewed publications. He was the founder (1990) and editor-in-chief of the international monthly journal Polymers for Advanced Technologies (PAT). PAT sponsors international biannual symposia for scientists, and Lewin often served as chairman, co-chairman or honorary chairman.

== Biography ==
Menachem Lewin was born in Sokoły, Poland on 26 March 1918, and was educated at the "Tachkemoni" school and at the Hebrew gymnasium "Tarbut" in Białystok. In 1926, he joined the youth movement "Betar". In 1933, he moved to Łódź and graduated from high school at the "Yitzchak Katznelson" grade A gymnasium. The first year of Lewin's academic studies was in the Wszechnica Lodzka. From 1935 to 1937, Lewin helped Ze'ev Jabotinsky during his visits to Łódź to organize lectures for Jews, in which he called on Jews to emigrate to Israel without delay. He served as deputy commander of the Łódź branch of Betar and as district officer of the Łódź district. He immigrated to Palestine in 1937 to study chemistry at the Hebrew University of Jerusalem. Lewin joined the "National Military Organization" (Ha'Irgun HaTzva'i HaLe'umi) and established with three other students an underground laboratory of war materials. In June 1939, Lewin was arrested by the British Mandate police, severely tortured, and sentenced by a military court to 4 years imprisonment with hard labor, which he served in prison in Jerusalem, the Atlit hard labor camp, the Acre fortress and the Mizra prison.

After his release from British prison, Lewin continued his university studies, receiving an MSc in chemistry in 1945 and a PhD in 1947. In 1947, Lewin was recruited into the army and joined the Hemed science corps. He served in the army until 1950 and within this framework, took part in the establishment of the Air Force Research Department and managed the fuel and fabrics testing laboratories.

Lewin was married to Esther Rachel, with whom he had three children - Dorit Dinur, Yitzchak Lewin, and Yehudit Weisinger. Lewin died in Jerusalem on February 18, 2011, and was buried on Har HaMenuchot.

== Scientific career ==
In 1950, Lewin joined Professor S. Sambursky in the establishment and organization of the Research Council of Israel in the prime minister's office. In this capacity, Lewin dealt with scientific research planning in key areas important to Israel, and began researching natural polymers, such as the fibers found in local vegetation that can serve as renewable raw materials for industry. In this field, Lewin initiated studies on the chemistry and technology of forest trees, wild plants and agricultural waste. As a result of studies carried out in collaboration with the agricultural researcher Prof. Menachem Plaut, Lewin initiated the renewed cultivation of flax for linen production. For the research, 5,000 acres of flax fields were sown in the south, and the Flax Company was established, in cooperation with the Central Hamashbir and various textile companies.

To find an economic basis for settlement in the Arava which was found to have salty groundwater, Lewin initiated an extensive survey of wild plants growing in the Arava, including the juncus plant. The study revealed that juncus fibers have special features for manufacturing fine papers. The Desert Plants Company was established and a juncus plantation of 75 acres was founded, watered by salt water in the area of Yotvata near the Jordanian border.

In the chemical and technological research conducted by Lewin and his students, the chemical composition, morphology, and methods of production of fibers were tested for their suitability to produce different types of paper. In one study, conducted on papyrus growing in the Hula Valley swamps, an original process was developed to produce high-quality insulation boards. Another study conducted by Lewin and his team was carried out on the industrial uses of agave sisalana plant debris, planted in the 1960s on large areas in southern Israel by the Jewish National Fund. In this study, processes were developed for producing various chemicals from the waste left over after producing sisal fibers; namely, the hecogenin used to produce steroidal drugs, a process originally developed and patented for cortisone production by Cornforth and Callow in the 1950s for Glaxo.

In 1951, Lewin founded the Association for Textile Research in collaboration with manufacturers in order to perform research for the development of Israeli industry. It was the first research association and was followed by similar associations in other industrial fields.

In 1953, Lewin initiated the establishment of the Institute of Fibers and Forest Products Research, (later known as the Israel Fiber Institute), which he ran until 1986. In the 1970s, there were 120 employees, including 40 PhD scientists. Several departments in the Institute performed research on polymers, synthetic and natural fibers, mechanical engineering, the chemistry of fabric curing processes and chemical additives for industrial use, detergents and cleaning, physics of fibers and fabrics, use of fibers in medicine and biotechnology, biological durability of fiber products, fire retardancy of polymeric and fiber materials, and more. A central role of the Institute was to assist the textile industry and other light industries suffering from a lack of professionals and know-how. Lewin took it upon himself to create detailed plans for the high-level education of industry experts. As a result, the Institute formed an affiliation with the Hebrew University in 1968, and the Division of Polymer and Textile Chemistry was established in the faculty of natural sciences. The hundreds of graduates of the division were absorbed by many factories in the country, and today they hold key positions in academia and in industry. In addition, Lewin has taught courses at the graduate level at the Hebrew University in chemistry and physical chemistry of polymers and fibers, and has guided many MSc and PhD studies.

The results of the studies that were carried out at the Israel Fiber Institute were made accessible to the United Nations Food and Agriculture organization (FAO). From 1956-1968, Lewin collaborated with the FAO and was appointed chairman of a group of experts on wood and plastics. Lewin participated in discussions on the development of renewable energy sources from wood and agricultural waste products. In the 1980s, Lewin served as an advisor to the government of Brazil on the development of ethanol fuel for cars instead of gasoline.

Of the studies carried out by Lewin and his team, the research on bromine markedly stands out. It dealt with problems of chemical structure and morphology of cellulose, polyester, polyamide, polyolefins, the changing crystalline structure of polymers, oxidation, bleaching and degradation of polymers, studies on flame retardancy of polymers, and more.

Bromine studies performed by Lewin were directed towards the discovery and development of new uses for bromine which is found in large quantities at the Dead Sea. The studies included, in addition to the basic chemistry of the various compounds of bromine, new industrial uses which enabled the expansion of production and marketing of bromine, and thus contributed to the country's economy. In these studies, a new technology of bleaching fabrics was developed for the textile industry, and a method of bleaching pulp for the production of paper and cardboard was devised. Another major technology was the use of bromine and its components in flame retardancy of polymeric materials. Lewin was among the first to develop this technology, and his invention to increase the flame retardancy of wood products by injecting bromine into wood was acclaimed. The use of bromine and its components in the flame retardancy of polymers has been developed over the years, and bromine products for this purpose have reached an annual export from Israel of hundreds of millions of dollars. Other uses of bromine researched by Lewin and his group were in the fields of medicine and biotechnology.

Lewin served as a visiting professor at several universities, including the University of North Carolina at Raleigh (1974, 1977), Kyoto University in Japan (1978, 1983), and the Brooklyn Polytechnic University (1982–1985), now the Polytechnic Institute of New York University. Lewin gave hundreds of invited lectures at universities, public and industrial research institutes, and international scientific conferences in many countries. He also served as the research director of the large firm JP Stevens in New Jersey during his sabbatical year in 1969-1970.

From 1974-1989, Lewin served as a member of the research council at the Chief Scientist's Bureau which initiated and financed the creation of the high-tech industry in Israel, and as a member of Israel's Technology Council. Lewin also served as national representative in the Macromolecules Committee of the International Union of Pure and Applied Chemistry (IUPAC).

== Post-retirement scientific research activities ==
When he retired in 1986, Lewin was invited by Professor Herman Mark to serve as research professor at the Polytechnic Institute of New York University. From then until shortly before his death, Lewin spent half of his time in the U.S. in this role. He developed new activities: he organized in 1987 and served as chairman of the first international Conference on Polymers for Advanced Technologies held in Jerusalem. As a result of this conference, Lewin founded in 1990 the scientific journal Polymers for Advanced Technologies, published by Wiley Publishing. Based on the journal, Lewin initiated 9 biannual international symposia in which Lewin served as chairman, co-chairman or honorary chairman, are well known, and are attended by hundreds of scientists from around the world.

In 1990, Lewin founded the first Conference on Recent Advances in Flame Retardancy of Polymeric Materials held in Stamford, Connecticut. Since then, 20 annual meetings were held on the same topic in which Lewin served as chairman. These conferences, which include forty invited lectures each by expert scientists from over 20 countries, institutionalized flame retardancy of polymers as one of the most important fields in polymer science.

During his activities in the United States, Lewin carried out a series of research projects on the crystalline structure of synthetic polymers, on new materials and processes for dentistry, and in flame retardancy of polymeric materials. Starting in 2004, Lewin began his efforts in nanotechnology. Lewin discovered and proved the migration of nano-particles to the surface of polymer nanocomposites. As a result of migration, a new ceramic surface is formed with useful properties for industry and the defense establishment.

Lewin published 175 scientific papers in peer-reviewed journals, and 20 books on chemistry and technology of polymers and fibers which were released by Decker, Plenum and Wiley. In 2008, Lewin published his 460-page autobiography in Hebrew, entitled "The Scroll of Menachem," published by the Jabotinsky Institute. He was awarded 29 patents in the U.S., Europe, Japan and Israel. In 2009, Lewin was invited to serve as editor-in-chief of the new Encyclopedia of Fiber Science and Engineering, which in the first stage will consist of 9 volumes, and will be published by Wiley.

== Awards and recognition ==
Lewin won the Geneva University Habif Award for outstanding cellulose research in 1959. He was recognized as a Yakir Yerushalayim, an honored citizen of Jerusalem in 1993. In 1999, a scientific conference was held in Tokyo to mark his 80th birthday in 1999. In 2003, a scientific conference in his honor was held at the University of Lille, France. In 2005, he received the Founders Award of the International Fiber Society and the Semplen Award from the Hungarian Academy of Sciences. The 10th PAT symposium which took place in Jerusalem in October 2009 marked his 90th birthday.
