= Yolanda Vadiz =

Puerto Rican soprano

- Born: February 14, 1959; San Juan, Puerto Rico
- Died: December 8, 1987 (aged 28); San Juan, Puerto Rico
- Occupation: musician

Yolanda Vadiz (February 14, 1959 – December 8, 1987) was a Puerto Rican soprano. She obtained her Bachelor of Arts in Puerto Rico and her master's from the Manhattan School of Music and Juilliard School in New York. While in New York, she sang the lead role in the zarzuela "Doña Francisquita" for the Repertorio Español theater company located at the Gramercy Arts Theater, Off-Broadway. As the winner of the Rome Festival in Italy, she played the role of Susanna in Le Nozze di Figaro. While in Italy, she was hired by RAI Television Network, and sang in front of kings and high dignitaries from different countries.

== Musical life ==
While still in the music conservatory, Vádiz was a finalist at the Metropolitan Opera House Eastern Region Auditions, and did concerts with the Puerto Rico Symphony Orchestra along with bass Justino Diaz, and singers Ruth Fernandez, Chucho Avellanet and Nydia Caro.

Vadiz was the daughter of Puerto Rican actress and show host Meche Marchand, and of Puerto Rican trio singer Jose Luis Vadiz Colon (known as Guito Vádiz). When Meche married the comedy actor and television host Luis Antonio Cosme. , before she was 15 years old, she was left in their custody. Cosme, seeing Yolanda's talent for singing, wanted to enroll her in the Escuela Libre de Música to begin her art studies.

Vádiz released her only album, Amor en Mil Idiomas, in 1986, produced by her mother and performed by Pedro Rivera Toledo. The song that gave the album its name became an instant hit, not only on gospel radio stations, in and outside Puerto Rico, but also on mainstream music stations.

== Personal life and death ==
Vádiz married Italian lawyer Vittoriano Iucci in 1986, and they moved to Rome. Upon their return to Italy, after promoting their new album in Puerto Rico, the couple suffered carbon monoxide poisoning caused by a defective gas heater in the apartment they were just moving into. Yolanda had turned on the gas heater after closing all the windows in the apartment. Her husband died immediately in his sleep. Vádiz fell into a coma and was transferred to a hospital in Rome. Her mother flew up to be by her side. The news of her critical condition and the death of her husband crossed the island of Puerto Rico immediately, and all the media transmitted bulletins of her state of health to the people of Puerto Rico.

Upon hearing the news, Cosme, helped by his television audience, rented a hospital plane so that Yolanda, still in a coma, could be transferred to her homeland, attended by doctors and nurses at her side. She arrived in Puerto Rico from Rome, still unconscious. Her mother flew separately on a commercial airline to be at the airport when her daughter landed. Yolanda's arrival at midnight was an event seen by many passers-by stopped on the streets and sidewalks of Isla Verde, and many others from their balconies as ambulances and their sirens passed by. The battery of doctors waiting for her at the entrance to the Regional Hospital was spectacular. However, despite efforts to save Yolanda, she died three days later.

In 1988, Cosme remarried, and he and his new wife had a daughter, whom they named Yolanda, to honor Vádiz's memory.

Some time later, her mother edited her music and released it on CD, including a video for her hit song "Amor en Mil Idiomas", which can still be found in major music stores and on the Internet through cdbaby. com.

Yolanda Vadiz died on December 8, 1987, and was buried at Cementerio La Piedad in Ponce, Puerto Rico.

== See also ==
- List of Puerto Ricans
