= Liberal Party (Mandatory Palestine) =

- Founder: Hassan Sidqi al-Dajani
- Founded: 1930
- Ideology: Liberalism

The Liberal Party (Hizb al-Ahrar) in Mandatory Palestine was established in 1930 by Hassan Sidqi al-Dajani and others.

== See also ==
- As'ad Shukeiri (1860–1940), LP co-founder and leader
- Dajani, surname
