= Saad al-Alami =

Grand Mufti of Jerusalem (1952–1993)

Saad el-Din el-Alami

Grand Mufti of Jerusalem
- In office 1952 – 6 February 1993
- Preceded by: Hussam ad-Din Jarallah
- Succeeded by: Sheikh Ekrima Sa'id Sabri

Personal details
- Born: 1911 Jerusalem
- Died: February 6, 1993 (aged 81–82)

Saad el-Din el-Alami (Arabic: سعد الدين العلمي; 1911 – 6 February 1993) was a Sunni Muslim religious leader of the Palestinian people and the fourth Grand Mufti of Jerusalem, in office from 1952 until his death.

Al-Alami was born in Jerusalem in 1911, and worked as a sharia judge in Ramallah from 1948–51 and in Nablus from 1951–53. The Alamis were a notable family in the Jerusalem area generally. In 1952, the Jordanian Jerusalem Islamic Waqf appointed Saad al-Alami as Mufti of Jerusalem in succession to Hussam ad-Din Jarallah.

After the Six-Day War in 1967 Al-Alami helped found the Islamic High Council to try to protect Muslim Holy Sites in Jerusalem from potential Israeli infringement.

Al-Alami used his position to speak about international politics. He issued a fatwa against Syrian President Hafez al-Assad on June 26, 1983, after Assad got into conflict with the PLO and Yasser Arafat during the Lebanese Civil War. Al-Alami said in the fatwa “This Asad, had murdered many Muslims, including Palestinian Muslims. The Islamic law is that such a person must be killed.”

In 1989, Al-Alami allowed Israeli troops on the al Aqsa Mosque grounds, the site where Mohammad is believed to ascend to heaven, after a group of Israeli extremist, The Temple Mount Faithful had been trying to build a temple on the mosque’s site. Al-Alami came to regret his decision after Israeli troops allowed Temple Mount Faithful members to start building the temple in October 1990. After Palestinian Muslims came to the Mosque, prepared to defend it, without warning or provocation Israeli soldiers shot into the crowd, killing 17, and wounding over 150.

== Positions held ==
- Served as a judge in Nasiriyah.
- Grand Mufti of Jerusalem and Acting Chief Justice of the West Bank.
- President of the Sharia Court of Appeals.
- Chairman of the Supreme Board of Al-Quds University.
- Member of the Muslim World League, 1985.

== Death ==
Al-Alami died on February 6, 1993 of heart failure, and was buried in Jerusalem.
