= Albert Jamil Butros =

Jordanian diplomat (1934–2021)

His Excellency Dr. Albert Jamil Butros
- ألبرت جميل بطرس
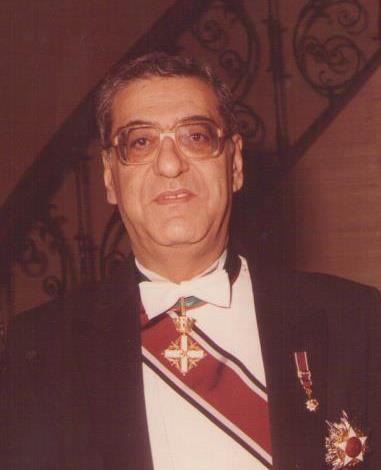

Jordanian Ambassador to the United Kingdom of Jordan to United Kingdom
- In office 1987–1991
- Preceded by: Hani Bahjat Tabbara
- Succeeded by: Fouad Ayoub

Personal details
- Born: 25 March 1934 Jerusalem
- Died: 31 August 2021 (aged 87) Amman, Jordan
- Spouse: married
- Children: 4 daughters
- Education: 1958 B.A. Honours (English studies), University of London; 1958 B.A. (ad eundem), University of Exeter; 1963: Ph. D. (English), Columbia University (N.Y.) : Professor Emeritus Department of English University of Jordan

Albert Jamil Butros (25 March 1934 – 31 August 2021) was a Jordanian diplomat and academic administrator who served as an ambassador and then Dean (education) of the University of Jordan.

Butros had a long and varied career in academia, diplomacy and politics, serving as Jordanian Ambassador to The United Kingdom, the Republic of Ireland and Iceland, as well as acting as special advisor to then Crown Prince Hassan bin-Talal of Jordan, and serving as a Professor of English at several universities in Jordan and the USA, and as a member of the Board of Governors of the International Development Research Centre.

== Early life ==
Albert Butros was born to a Roman Catholic family in Jerusalem on 25 March 1934.

== Academic career ==
Butros began his academic career in 1950, when he taught English language and Mathematics at Elementary and Secondary School in two Amman Private Schools.

In 1955, he was awarded a British Council Scholarship to England by the Jordan Ministry of Education, studying at Exeter University and the University of London, before completing his Doctorate at Columbia University, New York, through a Smith–Mundt Act Scholarship in the United States.

After completing his doctorate, he lectured English studies at the Hunter College, City University of New York. From 1962 to 1963 he instructed English at the Miami University in Oxford, Ohio, before becoming Associate English Professor at the University of Jordan in 1965.

He went on to serve as a Professor, and Chairman of the Department of English at the University of Jordan, a role he held until 1976.

From 1967 to 1973 and from 1974 to 1976 he was Chairman of the Department of English at the University of Jordan. From July 19 to September 2, 1969 he enjoyed a Leaders' Grant to the United States. From 1971 to 1972, he was Visiting Professor of English at the Wesleyan University in Ohio, and later served as Dean of Research and Graduate Studies of the University of Jordan. He also served as a Visiting English studies Professor at the Jordan University for Women in Amman.

Following a period of service in politics and diplomacy, he returned to the University of Jordan, where he continued teaching English until his retirement in 2004.

== Political and diplomatic career ==
From 1976 to 1984 he was Director General and President of Jordan's Royal Scientific Society in Amman, where he set the tone for an organisation which 'underpromised on what it would deliver, and did what it promised'. From 1984 to 1985 he was Special Advisor to the then Crown Prince Hassan bin-Talal of Jordan.

He went on to sit on the Board of Directors of Jordan's Telecommunications Corporation, the Council of the Federation of Arab Research Councils, The Royal Society of Fine Arts, and the Arab Thought Forum. In 1986, he was made a Fellow of the World Academy of Art and Science.

Dr Butros served as Chairman of UNESCO's Consultative Group of Experts on Science and Technology Policy, and on ALECSO's Science and Advisory Committee. He sat on the Board of Governors of the International Development Research Centre in Ottawa from 1986 to 1998.

In 1987, he was appointed Jordan's Ambassador to the United Kingdom of Great Britain and Northern Ireland, serving as Ambassador during the Gulf War.

He also had concurrent non-resident Diplomatic accreditation in Dublin, Ireland in 1988, and Reykjavík, Iceland, in 1990.

== Personal life and death ==
Butros married Ida Maria (Casie) Albina, and had four children, eight grandchildren and one great grandchild. He died in Amman on 31 August 2021, at the age of 87.

== Honours ==
- 1983: Grande Ufficiale of the Order of Merit of the Italian Republic.
- 1983-1984: Senior Research Fellow of the International Development Research Centre in Ottawa.
- 1986: Fellow of the World Academy of Art and Science.
- 1987: Order of Independence (Jordan)
- 1991: Knight, Order of Saint John (chartered 1888)

== Published work ==
- Tales of the Caliphs, Longmans Structural Readers, Stage 6, Longmans, 1965.
- English translation of Suleiman Mousa, T. E. Lawrence: An Arab View, Oxford University Press, 1966.
- "The Teaching of English at Post-Secondary Levels in Jordan," English Language Teaching, Vol. XXII, No. 2, January, 1966, 161-167.
- Arabic translation of Glenville Downey, Antioch in the Age of Theodosius the Great, Norman, University of Oklahoma Press, 1962. Translation published by Librairie du Liban, in conjunction with the Franklin Foundation, Beirut/New York, 1968.
- "The University of Jordan and its English Department: A Brief Survey," Overseas Universities, October 1968, 22-25.
- "The Development of the English Dictionary," Faculty of Arts Journal, University of Jordan, January 1969, 5-23.
- Leaders of Arab Thought, Longman Graded Structural Readers for the Arab World, Stage 6, Longman, 1969.
- "Standards," (in Arabic), Al-Mujahid Newspaper, Amman, Vol. I, No. 5, January 6, 1970.
- "Turkish, Italian and French Loanwords in the Colloquial Arabic of Palestine and Jordan," Studies in Linguistics, Vol. 23, June 1973, 86-104.
- Introduction (in Arabic) to Mahmud Odeh, Solar Energy, Beirut, Dar-al-Nahar, 1979, 13-19.
- The Importance of Specialized Professional Training for Developing Countries," Electronics in a Developing World, Philips, 1982, 25-30.
- "The Translatability of Chaucer into Arabic: A Test Case," Dirasat (Human and Social Sciences), Vol. 24, December 1997, 751-773.
- The English Language and Non-Native Writers of Fiction," International Journal of Arabic-English Studies, Vol. 5, 2004, 59-92.
- Geoffrey Chaucer: Introduction and Selected Translations. Arab Institute for Research and Publishing, 2009.
- Scores of official research, writings and translations.
- English editions of successive development plans in Jordan: 1973-1986.
