= Sulaiman Ja'abari =

Grand Mufti of Jerusalem (1993–1994)

Grand Mufti of Jerusalem
- In office 1993–1994
- Preceded by: Hussam Al-din Jarallah
- Succeeded by: Ekrima Sa'id Sabri

Deputy Mufti of Jerusalem
- In office 1949–1954
- Preceded by: Hussam Al-din Jarallah

Personal details
- Born: 1912 Hebron, Ottoman Empire
- Died: 1994 (aged 81–82)
- Education: Al-Azhar University
- Occupation: Sunni Muslim religious leader

Sulaiman Ja'abari (Arabic: سليمان الجعبري; 1912–1994) was a Sunni Muslim religious leader of the Palestinian people and the fifth Grand Mufti of Jerusalem. He became Grand Mufti in 1993 until his death in 1994.

Ja'abari was born in Hebron and was educated at Al-Azhar University in Cairo, Egypt. He became a qadi in religious courts in Jaffa, Lydda and Safed, and in 1949 was appointed the Deputy Mufti of Jerusalem by Hussam Al-din Jarallah, the Grand Mufti. When Jarallah died in 1954, no replacement was appointed. After Jarallah's death, Ja'abari became a qadi for Jordan and a mufti for the Royal Jordanian Land Force. He also worked for the Department of Education in Jerusalem, Hebron, Ramallah and El-Bireh. He retired in 1975.

In 1993, as Israel transferred more control over many of the Muslim holy sites in Jerusalem to the Palestinians, Palestine Liberation Organization chairman Yasser Arafat appointed Sulaiman Ja'abari as Grand Mufti of Jerusalem. He held this position until his death the following year, when Arafat appointed Ekrima Sa'id Sabri as his successor.
