= As'ad Shukeiri =

Grand Mufti of Jerusalem

Sheikh As'ad Shukeiri
- Portrait of Shukeiri in 1930s

Ottoman-appointed Qadi of Palestine
- In office 1914–1918

Mayor of Acre
- In office ?–?

Co-founder and leader of the Liberal Party (Mandatory Palestine)
- In office 1930–?

Head of the Supreme Muslim Council of Palestine
- In office ?–?

Personal details
- Born: 1860
- Died: 1940 (aged 79–80)
- Party: Liberal Party of Palestine
- Children: Ahmad

As'ad Shukeiri (Arabic: أسعد الشقيري, also transcribed al-Shuqayri, Shuqeiri, Shukeiry; 1860–1940) was a Palestinian religious scholar, political leader, and mayor of Acre, and the Ottoman-appointed qadi from 1914 to 1918. Kamil al-Husayni was the Hanafi mufti at the time and considered to be pro-British. Shukeiri was pro-Ottoman, favoring that Palestine continue to be part of the Ottoman Empire, and in 1908 and 1912 he was elected to the Ottoman parliament.

From the latter year to 1914, he served as the deputy of the District of Acre. Afterwards, he held several posts in Palestine's religious judiciary, including librarian of the Imperial Library and member of the Sharia court in Istanbul. During World War I, he was appointed mufti of the Fourth Ottoman Army in Syria, which included the Palestine region.

In 1930, he founded the Liberal Party in Palestine and became head of the Supreme Muslim Council during the era of British rule in Palestine. One of his children, Ahmad Shukeiri, later became the first leader of the Palestine Liberation Organization.

Shukeiri rejected the values of the Palestinian Arab nationalist movement and would work with Zionist leaders regularly. He worked in multiple pro-Zionist Arab organizations from the beginning of the British Mandate until his death in 1940 and he publicly rejected Mohammad Amin al-Husayni’s use of Islam against Zionism. His son, Ahmad Shukeiri, disagreed with his stance, calling on people in 1929 "to fight both imperialism and Zionism". Ahmad Shukeiri later founded the PLO, and served as its head for four years.
