= Muhammad al-Khalili =

Islamic scholar

Shaykh Muhammad al-Khalili
- محمد الخليلي

Personal life
- Died: 1734 Jerusalem, Ottoman Palestine
- Known for: Eminent 18th-century religious figure in Jerusalem
- Occupation: Mufti of Jerusalem

Religious life
- Religion: Islam
- Denomination: Sunni
- Jurisprudence: Shafi'i

Shaykh Muhammad al-Khalili (Arabic: محمد الخليلي; died 1734) was an Islamic scholar who served as the Shafi'i mufti of Jerusalem in the early eighteenth century. Historian Rashid Khalidi described him as "one of the most eminent eighteenth-century religious figures in Jerusalem."

== See also ==
- Islamic leadership in Jerusalem
