= Mohammed Tahir al-Husayni =

Palestinian Hanafi cleric (1842–1908)

- محمد طاهر مصطفى طاهر الحسيني
- Title: Qadi of Jerusalem

Personal life
- Born: 1842 Jerusalem, Damascus Eyalet, Ottoman Empire
- Died: 1908 (aged 65–66) Jerusalem, Mutasarrifate of Jerusalem, Ottoman Empire
- Children: Kamil; Amin
- Parent: Mustafa Tahir al-Husayni

Religious life
- Religion: Islam
- Denomination: Sunni
- School: Hanafi
- Creed: Maturidi

Muslim leader
- Period in office: 1860s – 1908
- Predecessor: Mustafa Tahir al-Husayni
- Successor: Kamil al-Husayni

Mohammed Tahir Mustafa Tahir al-Husayni (alternatively transliterated al-Husseini) (Arabic: محمد طاهر مصطفى طاهر الحسيني, 1842–1908) was the Qadi (Chief Justice) of the Sharia courts of Jerusalem and was the father of Kamil al-Husayni and Mohammad Amin al-Husayni, both of whom held the equivalent position in the British mandated period of Grand Mufti of Jerusalem.

== Life ==
Born in Jerusalem to the al-Husayni family, Tahir was appointed the Qadi of Jerusalem in the 1860s by officials in the Ottoman Empire. From 1865 until his death, he held the post of Mufti of Jerusalem. Tahir sat on the committee of A'ayan scrutinising land sales to foreigners in the Jerusalem area, this in effect stopped land sales to Jews for a few years, beginning in 1897.

Mohammed Tahir al-Husayni was one of the earliest critics of Zionism, and in the 1880s and 1890s, he tried several times to prevent Jewish immigrants, including Ottoman Jews, from purchasing lands in the Mutasarrifiyya of Jerusalem. In 1897, a commission headed by the Mufti managed to halt Jewish immigration for the next few years. When the Administrative Council received a report about Jewish immigration in September 1899, Mufti Husayni "proposed that the new arrivals be terrorised prior to the expulsion of all foreign Jews established in Palestine since 1891." But his proposal was turned down by the Mutasarrif in favor of a policy which allowed Jewish immigration as long as the immigrants assimilated as Ottoman citizens. Husayni, like some other Arab notables, was reported to have been involved in land sales to Jews in and around Jerusalem.

When Mohammed died, his son Kamil became the Mufti of Jerusalem and later (1918) the Grand Mufti.
