= Hussam ad-Din Jarallah =

Grand Mufti of Jerusalem (1948–1954)

Hussam al-Din Jarallah
- حسام الدين جار الله
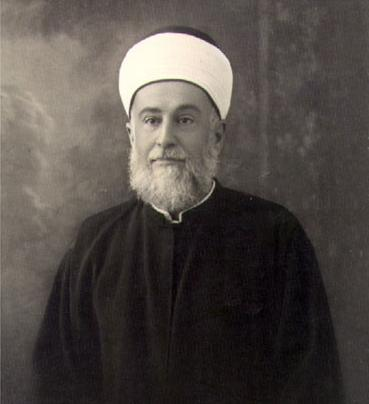

Grand Mufti of Jerusalem
- In office 1948 – 6 March 1954
- Preceded by: Amin al-Husayni
- Succeeded by: Saad al-Alami

Chief Qadi and Inspector of the Muslim Religious Courts in Palestine
- In office ?–?

Personal details
- Born: 1884 Jerusalem
- Died: 6 March 1954 (aged 69–70)
- Education: al-Azhar University
- Occupation: Religious leader, politician

Hussam al-Din Jarallah (Arabic: حسام الدين جار الله; 1884 – 6 March 1954) was a Sunni Muslim leader of the Palestinian people during the British Mandate of Palestine and was the Grand Mufti of Jerusalem from 1948 until his death.

Jarallah was born in Jerusalem and was educated at the al-Azhar University in Cairo, Egypt. He was a leading member of the Supreme Muslim Council during the British Mandate of Palestine. Politically, he was an ally of the Nashashibis and a rival of the al-Husaynis. When Kamil al-Husayni died in 1921, Jarallah had significant support from the ulema in Jerusalem to succeed al-Husayni as Grand Mufti. Indeed, he won the most votes in the election for the post. However, the British High Commissioner Herbert Samuel convinced Jarallah to withdraw, thus allowing al-Husayni's brother Amin to qualify as a candidate, whom Samuel then appointed Grand Mufti of Jerusalem As a consolation, the British appointed Jarallah as the chief qadi and inspector of the Muslim religious courts in Palestine. He was Minister of Justice of Transjordan from 1926 to 1929.

After the 1948 Arab–Israeli War, Transjordan (now Jordan) occupied the West Bank, including East Jerusalem and the Old City, an act opposed by the exiled Grand Mufti. On 20 December 1948, King Abdullah I named Jarallah Mufti in place of al-Husayni.
