= Walid Muhammed Sadi =

Jordanian diplomat

Waleed Muhammed Sadi

Jordanian Permanent Representative next the United Nations Office at Geneva of Jordan to United Nations
- In office 1975–1981
- Preceded by: Ibrahim Saleh Zreikat
- Succeeded by: Ghaleb Barakat; 1991: Shérif Fawaz Sharaf; 2001: Shehab A. Madi; 2012: Rajab Mohammed Sukayri; Saja Majali

Jordanian Ambassador to Turkey of Jordan to Turkey
- In office 1982–1985
- Preceded by: Hazem Nuseibeh
- Succeeded by: Hani Bahjat Tabbara

Personal details
- Born: August 19, 1939 Jerusalem
- Died: October 7, 2019 (aged 80)
- Education: Bachelor of Arts in Economics of the Southern Methodist University, Dallas, Doctor of law of the University of Chicago.

Waleed Muhammed Sadi (August 19, 1939 – October 7, 2019) was a Jordanian ambassador.

== Career ==
- He was editor of Jordan Times and continues to write a column on human rights for the newspaper.
- He was head of the Jordanian Delegation to the ICC Conference in Rome, Chairperson of the ICC's Working Group on Crimes against Humanity
- he represented the Jordanian government in New York City, Washington, D.C., Moscow, London and Paris.
- From 1975 to 1981 he was Permanent Representative next the United Nations Office at Geneva.
- From 1982 to 1985 he was Ambassador in Ankara.
- From 1980 to 1981 he was Chairman of the Commission on Human Rights.
- From 1978 to 1982, and from 1990 to 1994 he was Member of the Human Rights Committee.
- In 1998 he was Head of the delegation of Jordan to the United Nations Diplomatic Conference of Plenipotentiaries on the Establishment of an International Criminal Court in Rome.
- From 2003 to 2006 he was Chairman of the Working Group on Crimes against Humanity Commissioner-General National Centre for Human Rights in Amman.
