= Marwan Dudin =

Jordanian politician

Marwan Akram Dudin (Arabic: مروان دودين; 1936 – 18 April 2016) was a Jordanian politician and civil servant. He held high level positions at Jordan's national airline and the Hashemite Broadcasting Service before he held several ministerial posts in the 1970s and 1980s. His longest term as Minister was that of Agriculture, from 1980 to 1984. In his later life Dudin served in the Senate.

== Early life ==
Dudin was born in Beersheba, Palestine, in 1936. He studied English and literature at Cairo University.

Dudin started his career as a teacher of English, and he soon became a translator for Aramco in Saudi Arabia. From 1964 to 1967 he was dean of student affairs at the Saudi College for Petroleum and Minerals. He returned to Jordan to become director of the commercial division of airline Royal Jordanian, in which capacity he worked from 1968 to 1971. The two subsequent years he was director of the Hashemite Broadcasting Service.

== Political career ==
Dudin's political career took office in August 1973 when he was named Minister of Culture and Information. He served until November and was then made Minister of State for Prime Minister's Affairs. He kept this position until 1974. The same year he became director and chairman of the Jordanian Cooperative Organization. In 1978 he was made Jordan's ambassador to Romania. Back in Jordan he served shortly as director of the Cities and Villages Development Bank in 1980, until being appointed as Minister of Agriculture. Dudin was minister until 1984.

In 1986 Dudin started serving as Minister of State for the Occupied Territory Affairs. During his time in office he had to deal with corruption allegations towards high officials regarding the sale of olive oil from the West Bank to the Jordanian government. Dudin also led efforts for a $1-billion development plan for the Palestinian territories. In 1988 the Ministry of Occupied Territory Affairs was abandoned and Dudin was subsequently appointed as Minister of Labour.

Dudin was a member of the Senate during four different sessions; 18th (1998–2001), 19th (2001–2003), 22nd (2007–2009), 23rd (2009–2010). He served as a member of a Royal committee revisiting the constitutional design of Jordan, including the Constitution of Jordan and its Constitutional Court.

Dudin died on 18 April 2016.
