= Demographics of Jerusalem by quarter =

This article provides the demographics of Jerusalem by quarter, sub-quarter (neighborhood), and approximate totals for West and East Jerusalem according to the UN-recognized border (1967 border). Some sub-quarters straddle the Green Line and in those cases the sub-quarter is assigned to the sector (East or West) into which most of the area falls.

== 2021 ==
Source: Statistical Yearbook of Jerusalem, 2021.

West or East	Quarter #	Sub- quar- ter #	Quarter: Description/ Subquarter: Name	Subquarter name (Hebrew)	Total	Jews and others	Jews and others %	Approx. # of Ultra- Orthodox	Ultra- Orthodox as % of "Jews and Others"	Arabs/ Pale- stinians	Pale- stinian %
West Bank	Areas 2111–2911		Old City & East Jerusalem core		371,430	6,773	1.82%	68	1%	364,684	98.18%
West Bank	Areas 2111–2911	2112	Bet Hanina	בית חנינא	45,300	198	0.44%	0	0%	45,102	99.56%
West Bank	Areas 2111–2911	2111	Kafr 'Aqb, Atarot	כפר עקב, עטרות	42,410	14	0.03%	0	0%	42,396	99.97%
West Bank	Areas 2111–2911	2312	At-Tur, Mount of Olives	א-טור, מורדות הר הזיתים	30,690	181	0.59%	0	0%	30,509	99.41%
West Bank	Areas 2111–2911	2711	Jabal Mukabar	ג'בל מוכבר	26,800	214	0.80%	0	0%	26,585	99.20%
West Bank	Areas 2111–2911	2211	Shu'afat	שועפאט	24,280	84	0.35%	0	0%	24,197	99.66%
West Bank	Areas 2111–2911	2212	Shu'afat - refugee camp	מחנה פליטים שועפאט	23,400	22	0.09%	0	0%	23,378	99.91%
West Bank	Areas 2111–2911	2613	Ras Al-'Amud	ראס אל-עמוד	21,540	746	3.46%	0	0%	20,795	96.54%
West Bank	Areas 2111–2911	2511	Old City - Moslem Quarter	העיר העתיקה - הרובע המוסלמי	21,180	455	2.15%	0	0%	20,725	97.85%
West Bank	Areas 2111–2911	2311	Isawiyya	עיסאוויה	20,560	10	0.05%	0	0%	20,551	99.96%
West Bank	Areas 2111–2911	2811	Sur Bahar	צור באהר	20,370	33	0.16%	0	0%	20,337	99.84%
West Bank	Areas 2111–2911	2611	Silwan	סילוואן	19,900	686	3.45%	0	0%	19,214	96.55%
West Bank	Areas 2111–2911	2911	Bet Zafafa	בית צפאפא	15,320	183	1.19%	0	0%	15,137	98.81%
West Bank	Areas 2111–2911	2411	Wadi Al-Joz, Sheih Jarrah	ואדי אל ג'וז, שייח ג'ראח	13,700	193	1.41%	0	0%	13,507	98.59%
West Bank	Areas 2111–2911	2213	New Anata	ענאתה החדשה	12,810	18	0.14%	0	0%	12,792	99.86%
West Bank	Areas 2111–2911	2612	Abu Thor	אבו תור	12,450	144	1.16%	0	0%	12,306	98.84%
West Bank	Areas 2111–2911	2412	Bab Az-Zahara, Mas'udiya	באב א-זהרה, מסעודיה	6,370	70	1.10%	0	0%	6,300	98.90%
West Bank	Areas 2111–2911	2812	Um Tubba	אום טובא	5,120	0	0.00%	0	0%	5,117	99.94%
West Bank	Areas 2111–2911	2514	Old City - Christian Quarter	העיר העתיקה - הרובע הנוצרי	3,800	325	8.55%	0	0%	3,475	91.45%
West Bank	Areas 2111–2911	2512	Old City - Jewish Quarter	העיר העתיקה - הרובע היהודי	3,210	2,059	64.16%	844	41%	1,151	35.84%
West Bank	Areas 2111–2911	2513	Old City - Armenian Quarter	העיר העתיקה - הרובע הארמני	2,220	1,118	50.38%	391	35%	1,102	49.62%
West Bank	Quarter 1		Northeast		70,840	68,550	96.77%	26,734	39%	2,290	3.23%
West Bank	Quarter 1	11	Neve Ya'akov	נווה יעקב	26,470	26,141	98.76%	21,697	83%	329	1.24%
West Bank	Quarter 1	13	Pisgat Ze'ev east	פסגת זאב מזרח	23,870	23,041	96.53%	691	3%	829	3.47%
West Bank	Quarter 1	12	Pisgat Ze'ev north	פסגת זאב צפון	20,500	19,368	94.48%	4,455	23%	1,130	5.51%
West Bank	Quarter 4		North (WB)		66,780	66,281	99.25%	55,013	83%	492	0.74%
West Bank	Quarter 4	42	Ramot Alon north	רמות אלון צפון	31,890	31,652	99.25%	27,221	86%	237	0.74%
West Bank	Quarter 4	43	Ramot Alon south	רמות אלון דרום	19,210	19,020	99.01%	12,363	65%	190	0.99%
West Bank	Quarter 4	41	Ramat Shlomo	רמת שלמה	15,680	15,639	99.74%	15,170	97%	41	0.26%
Crosses Line	Quarter 5										
West Bank	Quarter 5 (WB)	52	Ramat Eshkol, Giv'at Hamivtar	רמת אשכול, גבעת המבתר	11,540	11,434	99.08%	9,833	86%	106	0.92%
West Bank	Quarter 5 (WB)	53	Ma'alot Dafna-WB, Shmuel Hanavi-Green Line	מעלות דפנה, שמואל הנביא	10,870	10,739	98.79%	9,880	92%	131	1.21%
West Bank	Quarter 5 (WB)	54	Giv'at Shapira (French Hill) Including the Mt, Scopus student dormitories	גבעת שפירא (הגבעה הצרפתית) כולל מעונות הסטודנטים בהר הצופים	7,860	6,396	81.38%	1,215	19%	1,463	18.61%
Crosses Line	Quarter 13										
West Bank	Quarter 13 (WB)	135	East Talpiot-West Bank	תלפיות מזרח	14,790	14,385	97.26%	0	0%	405	2.74%
West Bank	Quarter 16		South (WB)		57,260	56,273	98.28%	7,316	13%	981	1.71%
West Bank	Quarter 16	162	Homat Shmuel (Har Homa)	חומת שמואל (הר חומה)	25,500	25,424	99.70%	2,797	11%	76	0.30%
West Bank	Quarter 16	163	Gilo (east)	גילה (מזרח)	20,040	19,519	97.40%	3,318	17%	520	2.60%
West Bank	Quarter 16	164	Gilo (west)	גילה (מערב)	11,720	11,319	96.58%	1,245	11%	400	3.41%
Total East Jerusalem					611,370	240,831	39.4%	111,121	46.1%	370,532	60.6%
Crosses Line	Quarter 5										
Green Line	Quarter 5 (GL)	51	Har Hotzvim, Sanhedria, Tel Arza - all Green Line	הר חוצבים, סנהדריה, תל ארזה	15,620	15,569	99.67%	14,946	96%	46	0.29%
Green Line	Quarter 8				85,460	84,275	98.61%	62,364	74%	1,181	1.38%
Green Line	Quarter 8	82	Geula, Me'a She'arim	גאולה, מאה שערים	39,070	38,955	99.71%	37,786	97%	113	0.29%
Green Line	Quarter 8	83	Mekor Baruch, Zichron Moshe	מקור ברוך, זכרון משה	17,160	17,065	99.45%	15,529	91%	96	0.56%
Green Line	Quarter 8	85	Nahlaot, Zichronot	נחלאות, זכרונות	9,890	9,642	97.49%	2,893	30%	248	2.51%
Green Line	Quarter 8	86	Rehavya	רחביה	8,420	8,328	98.91%	1,499	18%	93	1.11%
Green Line	Quarter 8	84	City Center	מרכז העיר	7,220	6,898	95.54%	2,069	30%	321	4.45%
Green Line	Quarter 8	81	Mamilla, Morasha (Musrara)	ממילא, מורשה (מוסררה)	3,700	3,425	92.57%	2,363	69%	275	7.43%
Green Line	Quarter 9		Northwest-GL		57,110	56,812	99.48%	49,995	88%	297	0.52%
Green Line	Quarter 9	91	Romema	רוממה	26,470	26,364	99.60%	25,837	98%	106	0.40%
Green Line	Quarter 9	93	Har Nof	הר נוף	16,180	16,156	99.85%	13,894	86%	22	0.14%
Green Line	Quarter 9	92	Giv'at Shaul	גבעת שאול	14,460	14,292	98.84%	10,576	74%	168	1.16%
Green Line	Quarter 10		'North-northwest GL		65,990	65,503	99.26%	24,891	38%	497	0.75%
Green Line	Quarter 10	103	Bayit Vagan	בית וגן	22,210	22,142	99.69%	17,935	81%	68	0.31%
Green Line	Quarter 10	101	Kiryat Moshe, Beit Hakerem	קרית משה, בית הכרם	27,670	27,418	99.09%	3,839	14%	251	0.91%
Green Line	Quarter 10	104	Ramat Sharet, Ramat Denya	רמת שרת, רמת דניה	12,520	12,373	98.83%	2,846	23%	147	1.17%
Green Line	Quarter 10	102	Giv'at Ram	גבעת רם	3,590	3,513	97.85%	281	8%	75	2.09%
Green Line	Quarter 11		West GL		46,260	45,687	98.76%	8,681	19%	573	1.24%
Green Line	Quarter 11	114	Kiryat Menahem, Ir Ganim	קרית מנחם, עיר גנים	18,870	18,613	98.64%	1,303	7%	256	1.36%
Green Line	Quarter 11	112	Kiryat Hayovel (north)	קרית היובל (צפון)	14,360	14,272	99.39%	5,566	39%	88	0.61%
Green Line	Quarter 11	113	Kiryat Hayovel (south)	קרית היובל (דרום)	11,030	10,911	98.92%	1,855	17%	119	1.08%
Green Line	Quarter 11	111	Ein Kerem, Kiryat Hadassah	עין כרם, קרית הדסה	2,000	1,903	95.16%	95	5%	97	4.84%
Green Line	Quarter 12		Southwestern GL		40,030	39,407	98.44%	3,941	10%	628	1.57%
Green Line	Quarter 12	121	Gonen (Katamon) A - I	גונן (קטמון) א' - ט'	24,380	23,857	97.85%	1,193	5%	522	2.14%
Green Line	Quarter 12	122	Giv'at Havradim (Rassco), Giv'at Mordechay	גבעת הוורדים (רסקו), גבעת מרדכי	15,650	15,562	99.44%	2,957	19%	87	0.56%
Crosses Line	Quarter 13 (GL)										
Green Line	Quarter 13 (GL)	134	Talpiot, Arnona, Mekor Haim	תלפיות, ארנונה, מקור חיים	18,670	18,189	97.42%	728	4%	478	2.56%
Green Line	Quarter 13 (GL)	133	Ge'ulim (Baq'a), Giv'at Hananya (Abu Tor), Yemin Moshe	גאולים (בקעה), גבעת חנניה (אבו תור), ימין משה	12,410	11,193	90.20%	112	1%	1,216	9.80%
Green Line	Quarter 13 (GL)	131	German Colony, Gonen (Old Katamon)	המושבה הגרמנית, גונן (קטמון הישנה)	9,810	9,708	98.96%	485	5%	102	1.04%
Green Line	Quarter 13 (GL)	132	Komemiyut (Talbiya), YMCA Compound	קוממיות (טלביה), מתחם ימק"א	3,480	3,386	97.30%	102	3%	94	2.70%
Total West Jerusalem					354,840	349,734	98.6%	166,688	47.7%	5,088	1.4%
Total Jerusalem					966,210	590,565	61%	277,809	29%	375,620	39%

Totals do not sum exactly due to the presentation of some ethnoreligious groups as percentages of totals.

Two quarters span East and West Jerusalem:

West or East	Quarter #	Sub- quar- ter #	Quarter: Description/ Subquarter: Name	Subquarter name (Hebrew)	Total	Jews and others	Jews and others %	Approx. # of Ultra- Orthodox	Ultra- Orthodox as % of "Jews & Others"	Arabs/ Pale- stinians	Pale- stinian %
Crosses Line	Quarter 5		North-Northeast (split)		45,890	44,185	96.28%	34,906	79%	1,718	3.74%
Crosses Line	Quarter 13		East Talpiot SE, WB		59,160	56,871	96.13%	1,706	3%	2,281	3.85%
