= Sokoły =

Sokoły is the nominative, accusative, and vocative plural of the word "sokół," meaning "falcon."

Sokoły may also refer to the following places:

- Sokoły, Grajewo County in Podlaskie Voivodeship (north-east Poland)
- Sokoły, Kolno County in Podlaskie Voivodeship (north-east Poland)
- Sokoły, Wysokie Mazowieckie County in Podlaskie Voivodeship (north-east Poland)
- Sokoły, Masovian Voivodeship (east-central Poland)
- Sokoły, Gołdap County in Warmian-Masurian Voivodeship (north Poland)
- Sokoły, Pisz County in Warmian-Masurian Voivodeship (north Poland)
