= Meche Marchand =

Israeli actor and writer

Meche Marchand (Hebrew: מֵקֵי מַרְשָׁנְד) who now goes by the name of Rivka Marchand, (Hebrew: רבקה מרצ'נד) is an actress and author.

Marchand was born in Puerto Rico where she was a radio, television and stage actress. She lived in Orlando, Florida where she worked as a Court Interpreter, Hebrew teacher and recording talent for several studios. She is the mother of soprano Yolanda Vadiz, who died in December, 1987. Marchand was once married to celebrity Luis Antonio Cosme.

She is the author of Manual de Consejitos Utiles, Mi Camino, mi Verdad, mi Yolanda; and co-author of the cook book Friendo y Comiendo. Her most recent work is Valgame Dios - Exposicion de la historia, cultura, lenguaje y religion de un pueblo que nos afecta a todos. She made Aliyah (moved to Israel) in 2005, and now lives in Jerusalem.
