= Givara Budeiri =

Palestinian journalist (born 1976)

- جيفارا البديري
- Born: Givara Ishaq Ahmad al-Budeiri; 1976 (age 49–50); Jerusalem, Israeli-occupied West Bank
- Other name: Guevara Al-Budayri
- Education: Yarmouk University
- Occupation: Journalist
- Spouse: Fouad Al-Muthaffar
- Children: 2

Givara (or Guevara) Ishaq Ahmed al-Budeiri (or Al-Budayri/Al-Budairi; Arabic: جيفارا إسحاق أحمد البديري; born 1976) is a Palestinian journalist who reports from the West Bank for Al Jazeera channel. She holds a bachelor's degree in Journalism and Media from Yarmouk University in Jordan.

Budeiri was arrested by the Israeli forces on June 5, 2021 while covering a sit-in in the Sheikh Jarrah neighborhood of Jerusalem. She was violently assaulted and arrested along with the photographer Nabil Mazzawi, who worked with her, she got released on the same day by the Israeli police, with the prevention from entering the Sheikh Jarrah neighborhood for 15 days.

She was arrested again, this time by the Palestinian Authority, on January 19, 2025, alongside her cameraman, and was taken to the Beitunia headquarters of the Palestinian Preventive Security. She was working on a report ahead of the release of Palestinian detainees as part of the prisoner exchange deal in the Israel–Hamas ceasefire.

== Personal life ==
Budeiri was named after Argentine guerrilla leader Che Guevara, of whom she said "many Palestinians see him as a symbol". She is the daughter of the Jerusalem lawyer and journalist Ishaq Ahmed Al-Budayri, director of the Orient House, and his wife Hedaya Al-Kazemi, president of the Arab Women's Union Association in Jerusalem; her siblings are journalist and media figure Ahmed Al-Budayri and lawyer Oruba Al-Budayri. She is married to the dentist Fouad Al-Muthaffar, and have two daughters.
