= Grand Mufti of Jerusalem =

Sunni clerical title

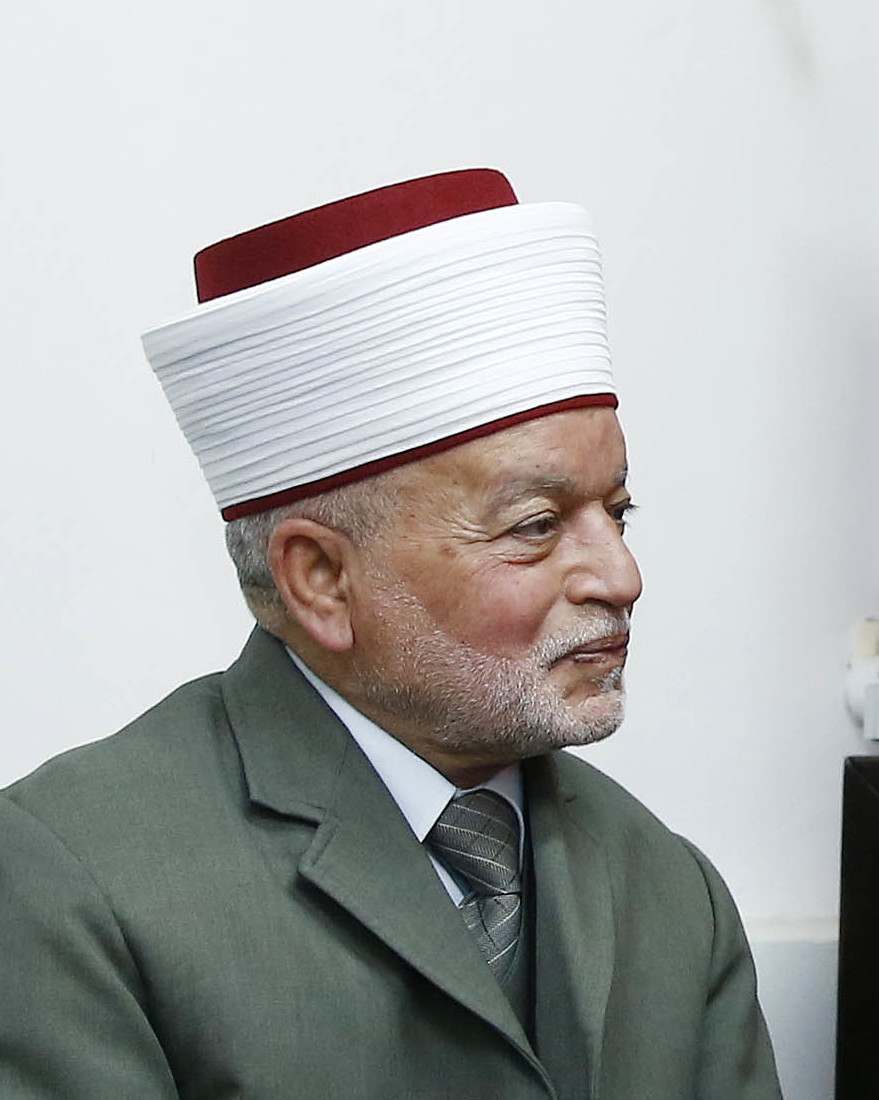
Muhammad Ahmad Hussein, Grand Mufti of Jerusalem (2006–present)

The Grand Mufti of Jerusalem (Arabic: المفتي العام للقدس) is the Sunni Muslim cleric in charge of Jerusalem's Islamic holy places, including Al-Aqsa. The position was created by the British military government led by Ronald Storrs in 1918. Since 2006, the position has been held by Muhammad Ahmad Hussein, appointed by the Palestinian president, Mahmoud Abbas.

== History ==
=== British Mandate ===
The Grand Mufti of Jerusalem was a position created by the British Mandate authorities. The new title was intended by the British to "enhance the status of the office".

The politics behind the institution may have originally meant to divide the Palestinian Elite and co-opt Palestinian leadership into supporting the British. Also, the first appointed Mufti Hajj Amin al-Husayni was the cousin of the head of the nationalist Arab Executive of the Palestinian congresses, Musa Kazim Pasha al-Husayni, and thus Amin's appointment ruffled feathers in the family. Not only did this institution instigate disunity amidst the Palestinian leadership, but it also enforced the idea that the Arab population of Palestine had no national nature and consisted only of religious communities.

When Kamil al-Husayni died in 1921, the British High Commissioner Herbert Samuel appointed Mohammad Amin al-Husayni to the position. Amin al-Husayni, a member of the al-Husayni family of Jerusalem, was an Arab nationalist and Muslim leader in the British Mandate of Palestine. As Grand Mufti and leader in the Arab Higher Committee, especially during the war period 1938-45, al-Husayni played a key role in violent opposition to Zionism and closely allied himself with the Nazi regime in Germany.

=== Jordanian Waqf ===
In 1948, after Jordan occupied Jerusalem, Abdullah I of Jordan officially removed al-Husayni from the post, banned him from entering Jerusalem, and appointed Hussam Al-din Jarallah as Grand Mufti. On the death of Jarallah in 1952, Jordan's Jerusalem Islamic Waqf appointed Saad al-Alami as his replacement. The Waqf appointed Sulaiman Ja'abari in 1993, following the death of al-Alami.

=== Palestinian Authority ===
After Ja'abari's 1994 death, two rival muftis were appointed: the Palestinian Authority (PA) nominated Ekrima Sa'id Sabri, while Jordan named Abdul Qader Abdeen, head of the Religious Appeals Court. This reflected a discrepancy between the Oslo I Accord, which envisaged a transfer of authority from Israel to the PA, and the Israel–Jordan peace treaty, which recognised Hashemite custodianship of Jerusalem holy sites. Local Muslims endorsed the PLO's view that Jordan's action was an unwarranted interference; Ja'abari's popular mandate meant that Abdeen's claim "soon faded away altogether" and he formally retired in 1998.

Sabri was removed in 2006 by PA president Mahmoud Abbas, who was concerned that Sabri was involved too heavily in political matters.

Abbas appointed Muhammad Ahmad Hussein, who was perceived as a political moderate. Shortly after his appointment, Hussein made comments indicating that suicide bombing was an acceptable tactic for Palestinians to use against Israel.

== List ==
- Kamil al-Husayni from the creation of the role in 1918 until his death in 1921
- Mohammad Amin al-Husseini from 8 May 1921 to 1948; exiled by the British in 1937 but not dismissed as Mufti
- Hussam ad-Din Jarallah from 20 December 1948 to 6 March 1954
- Saad al-Alami from 1953 to 6 February 1993
- Sulaiman Ja'abari from 17 February 1993 (Jordan) / 20 March 1993 (PA) to 11 October 1994
- Abdul Qader Abdeen (Jordan) from 11 October 1994 to 1998
- Ekrima Sa'id Sabri (PA) from 16 October 1994 to July 2006
- Muhammad Ahmad Hussein from July 2006 to present

== See also ==
- Chief Rabbi of Jerusalem
- Patriarch of Jerusalem (disambiguation)
- Custodian of the Two Holy Mosques
- Grand Mufti
- Jerusalem in Islam
- Pro-Jerusalem Society (1918-1926) - the Grand Mufti was a member of its leading Council

== Sources ==
- Nazzal, Nafez (1997). Historical dictionary of Palestine. Lanham, Md: Scarecrow. ISBN 978-0-585-21029-2 – via Internet Archive.
