= Ekrima Sa'id Sabri =

1994–2006 Grand Mufti of Jerusalem

Sheikh Ekrima Sa'id Sabri عكرمة سعيد صبري
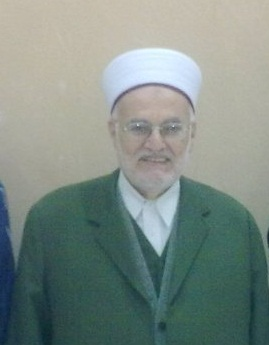

Personal life
- Born: 1939 (age 86–87) Qalqilya, Mandatory Palestine

Religious life
- Religion: Islam
- Denomination: Sunni
- Creed: Ash'ari

Muslim leader
- Post: Grand Mufti of Jerusalem
- Period in office: October 1994 - July 2006
- Predecessor: Sulaiman Ja'abari
- Successor: Muhammad Ahmad Hussein

Sheikh Ekrima Sa'id Sabri (Arabic: عكرمة سعيد صبري; born 1939) is a religious leader and former Grand Mufti of Jerusalem and Palestine from October 1994 to July 2006.

== Biography ==
Sabri was born in 1939 in the Palestinian town of Qalqilya.

== Career ==
Mahmoud Abbas removed Sabri as mufti in July 2006, reportedly for his growing popularity and open expression of assertive political views. Abbas appointed Muhammad Ahmad Hussein in July 2006 as Sabri's successor.

In May 2018, Sabri was barred from travelling abroad and visiting the West Bank due to his participation in "anti-Israel" conferences. In January 2020, he was barred from entering to the Al-Aqsa Mosque after an Israeli police officer accused him of "incitement" during a Friday sermon that he held. On 10 March 2021, Sabri was arrested by Israeli authorities at his home in East Jerusalem as he prepared his Friday sermon for interrogation. He was released shortly after.

In January 2023, Israeli forces raided Sabri's home in the Al-Sawwana neighbourhood in East Jerusalem and gave him a summons order at the Maskubiya Police Station in West Jerusalem.

In June 2024, Sabri was charged of "inciting terrorism" after allegedly praising the 2022 Tel Aviv shooting and an attack at the Ma'ale Adumim in October 2024, killing an Israeli soldier. In response, Sabri denied the accusations, stating that he merely offered condolences to the families of the attackers after their deaths, as well as calling the indictment as "fabricated" and "malicious".

On 2 August 2024, he was again arrested by Israeli authorities after eulogizing and expressing condolences to Ismail Haniyeh's assassination. Consequently, Israeli police banned Sabri from entering the Al-Aqsa Mosque and its surrounding courtyards for six months.

== Controversy ==
In a 1999 interview regarding the political situation on the Temple Mount, Sabri stated, "If the Jews want peace, they will stay away from Al Aqsa. This is a decree from God. The Haram al-Sharif belongs to the Muslim. But we know the Jew is planning on destroying the Haram. The Jew will get the Christian to do his work for him. This is the way of the Jews. This is the way Satan manifests himself. The majority of the Jews want to destroy the mosque. They are preparing this as we speak."

In a July 2001 interview with Jeffrey Goldberg for The New Yorker, Sabri remarked: "Look at the society of the Israelis. It is a selfish society that loves life. These are not people who are eager to die for their country and their God. The Jews will leave this land rather than die, but the Muslim is happy to die."

On 20 February 2005, Sabri appeared on Saudi Arabian Al Majd TV to comment on the assassination of Rafic Hariri, the former Lebanese Prime Minister. Sabri stated, "Anyone who studies The Protocols of the Elders of Zion and specifically the Talmud will discover that one of the goals of these Protocols is to cause confusion in the world and to undermine security throughout the world."

== See also ==
- Grand Mufti of Jerusalem
