= Kamil al-Husayni =

Grand Mufti of Jerusalem

Grand Mufti Kamil al-Husayni
- كامل الحسۆن
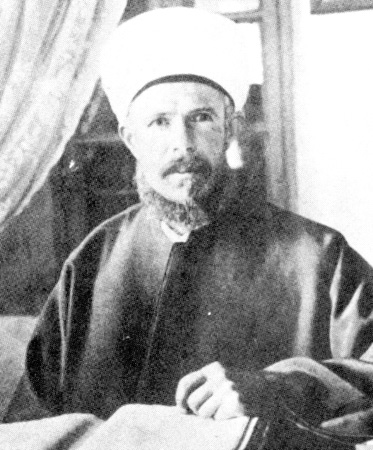

Personal life
- Born: Kamel ibn Mohammad Taher ibn Mostafa Taher ibn al-Husayni; 23 February 1867 Jerusalem, Damascus Eyalet, Ottoman Empire
- Died: 31 March 1921 (aged 54) Jerusalem, Mandatory Palestine
- Resting place: Jerusalem

Religious life
- Religion: Islam
- Denomination: Sunni
- School: Sufism
- Jurisprudence: Hanafi
- Creed: Maturidi
- Profession: Mufti

Muslim leader
- Predecessor: Mohammed Tahir al-Husayni
- Successor: Amin al-Husayni

Kamil al-Husayni (also spelled Kamel al-Hussaini; Arabic: كامل الحسيني; 23 February 1867 – 31 March 1921) was a Sunni Muslim religious leader in Palestine and member of the al-Husayni family. He was the Hanafi Mufti of Jerusalem from 1908, and in 1918 the British Mandate authorities appointed him as the first Grand Mufti of Jerusalem, a title they had copied from the Grand Mufti of Egypt. The British referred to him as “the representative of Islam in Palestine and a member of the oldest nobility of the country”.

Al-Husayni was the son of Mohammed Tahir al-Husayni, who had preceded him as Hanafi Mufti of Jerusalem.

Politically, his approach was very different from his father’s. During the British Mandate for Palestine, he sought compromise with the Jews and British authorities. The British appointed him chairman of the Appeal Courts and later director of the Higher Waqf Committee. The British also made him a Companion of the Order of St Michael and St George (CMG).

He died in Jerusalem on the 31st of March 1921, and was succeeded as Grand Mufti by his half-brother Mohammad Amin al-Husayni.

== Bibliography ==
- Porath, Yehoshua (1971). "Al Hajj Amin al Huseyni, Mufti of Jerusalem". Asian and African Studies. Jerusalem Academic Press.
- Zvi Elpeleg (1992, David Harvey, trans.). ‘’The Grand Mufti : Haj Amin al-Hussaini, Founder of the Palestinian National Movement’’ (London: Frank Cass) ISBN 0-7146-3432-8
