= Grand Mufti =

Appointed leading or chief muftis of states

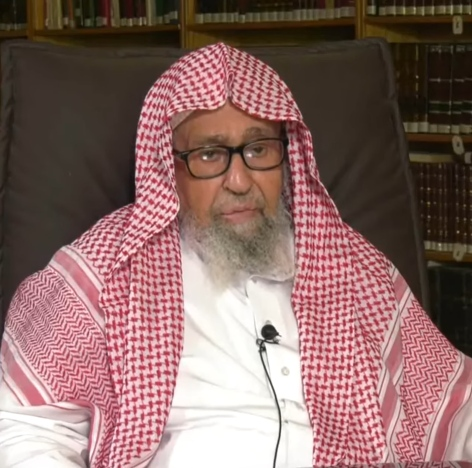
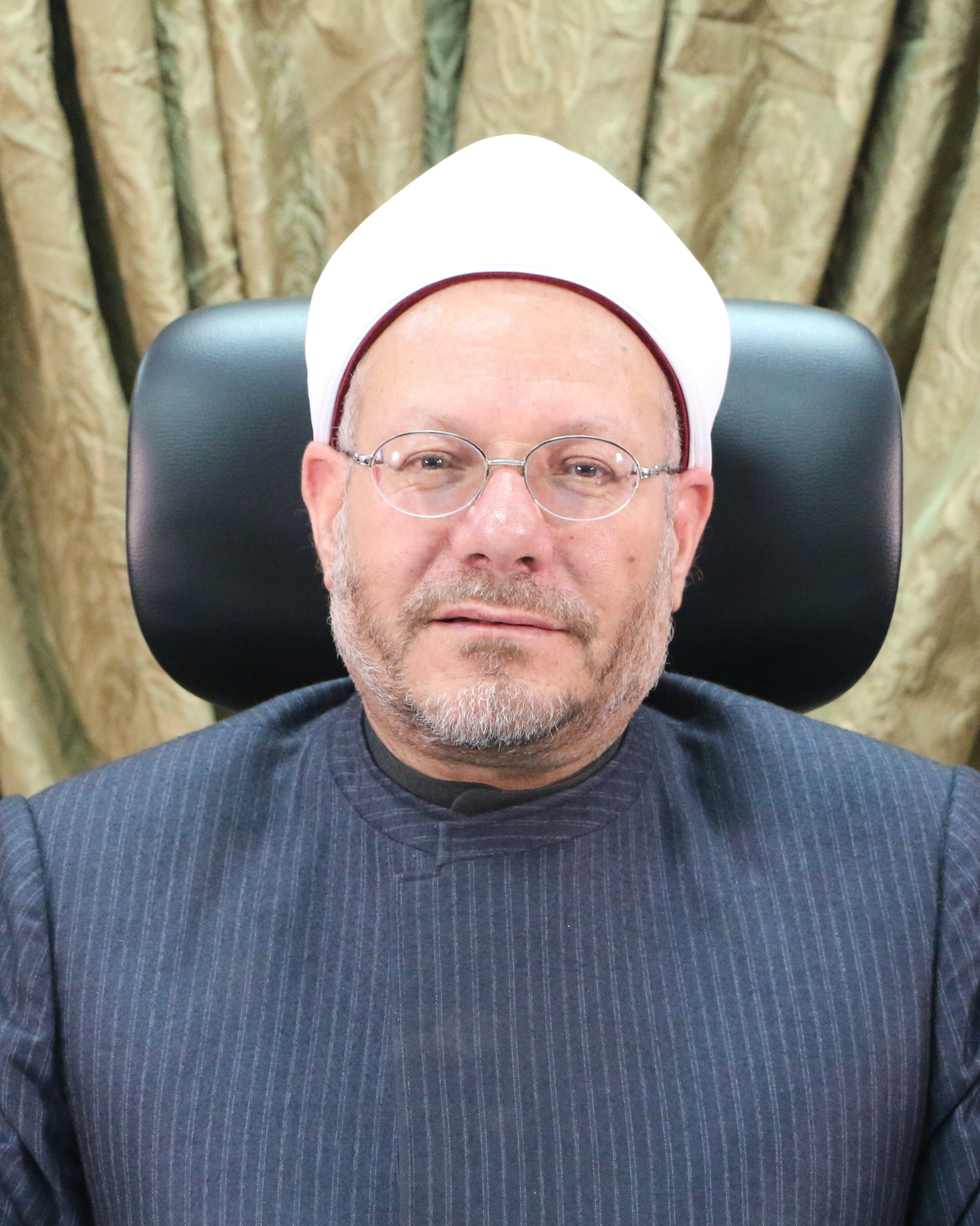
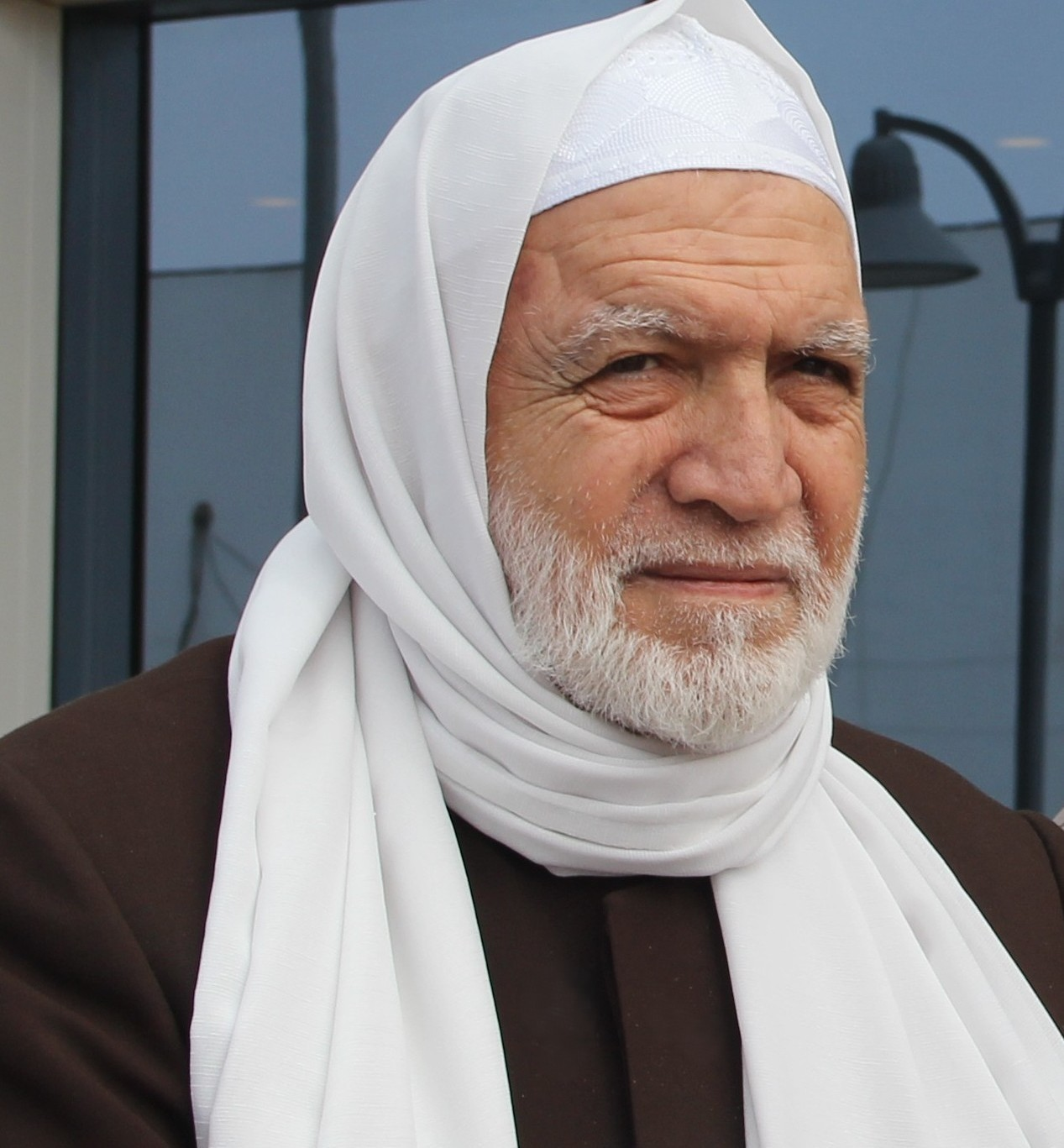
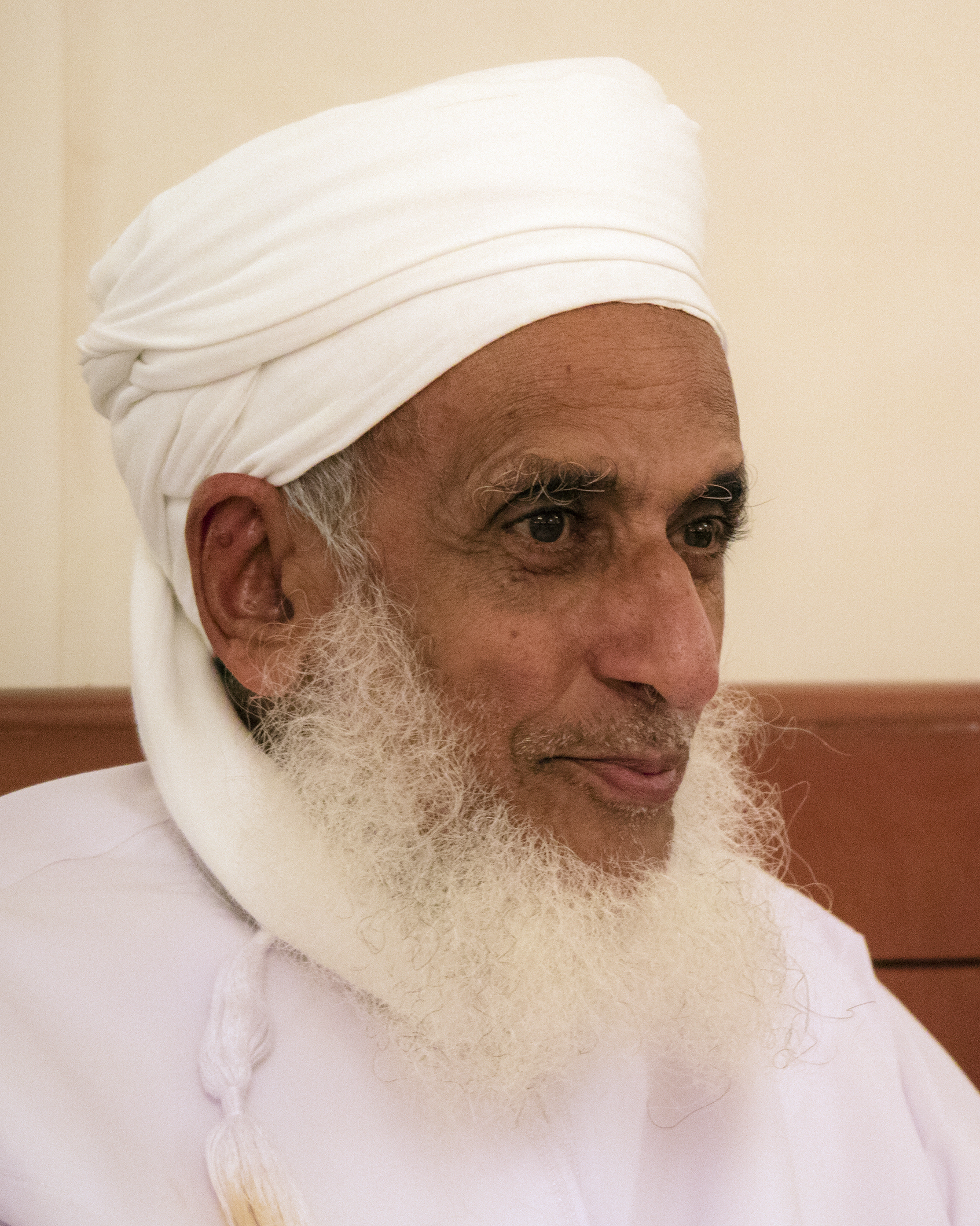
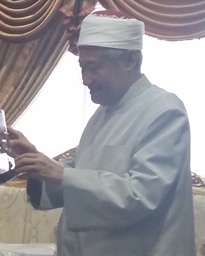
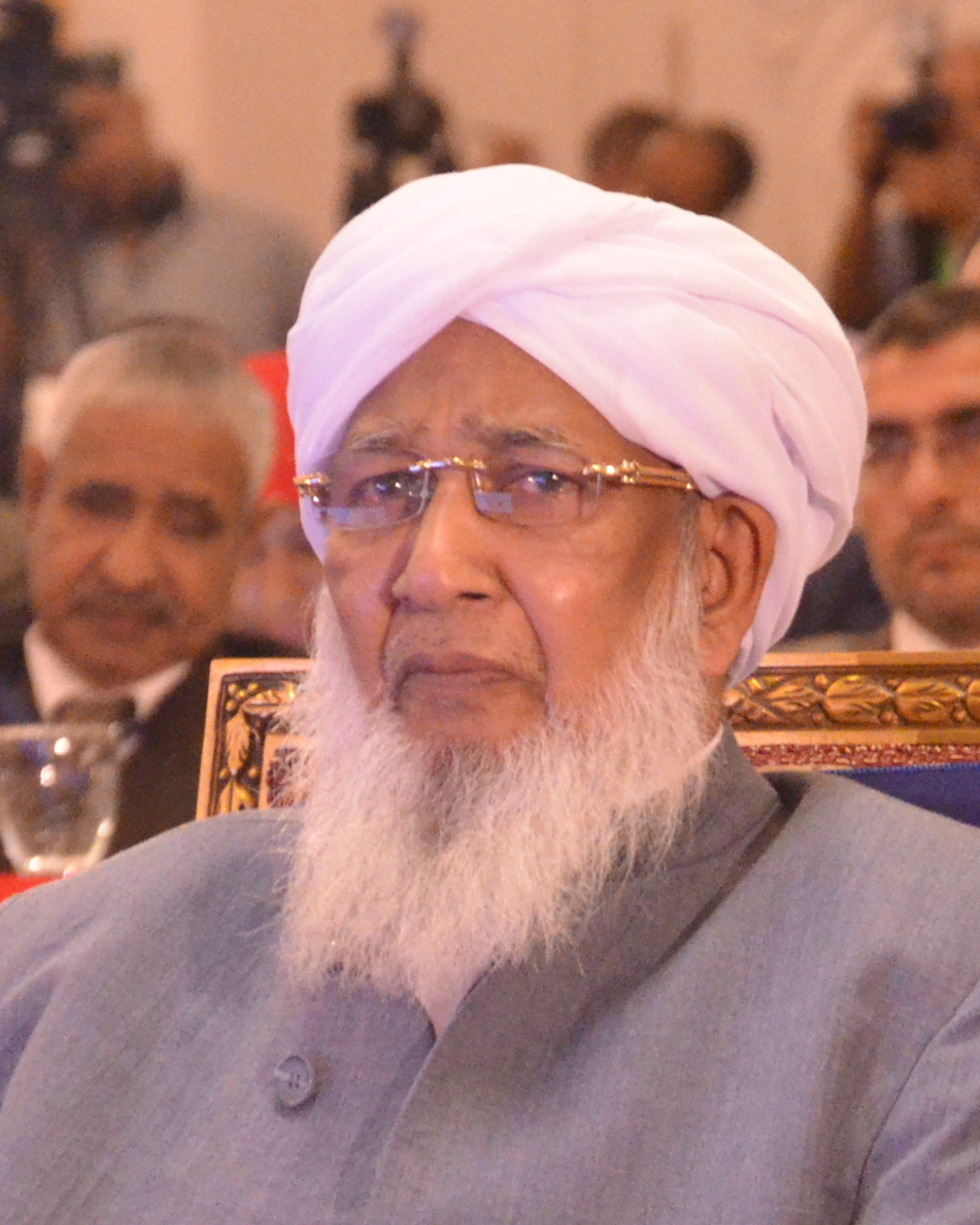
Grand Mufti of various countries:

- Salih al‑Fawzan, Grand Mufti of Saudi Arabia
- Shawki Allam, Grand Mufti of Egypt
- Osama al-Rifai, Grand Mufti of Syria
- Ahmed bin Hamad al-Khalili, Grand Mufti of Oman

- Abdul Aziz Juned, Grand Mufti of Brunei
- Sheikh Abubakr Ahmad, Grand Mufti of India
- Nedžad Grabus, Grand Mufti of Bosnia and Herzegovina

A Grand Mufti (also called Chief Mufti, State Mufti and Supreme Mufti) is a title for the leading Islamic jurist of a country or grand muftiate, typically Sunni, who may oversee other muftis. Not all countries with large Sunni Muslim populations have Grand Muftis; in those that do, the Grand Mufti is typically appointed by the state or elected by a council of scholars. The office originated in the early modern era in the Ottoman Empire and has been later adopted in a number of countries that were never part of the Ottoman Empire.

Muftis are Islamic jurists qualified to issue a nonbinding opinion (fatwa) on a point of Islamic law (sharia). In the 15th century, muftis of the Ottoman Empire, who had acted as independent scholars in earlier times, began to be integrated into a hierarchical bureaucracy of religious institutions and scholars. By the end of the 16th century, the government-appointed mufti of Istanbul came to be recognized under the title Shaykh al-Islam (Turkish: şeyhülislam) as the Grand Mufti in charge of this hierarchy. The Ottoman Grand Mufti performed a number of functions, including advising the sultan on religious matters, legitimizing government policies, and appointing judges. After the dissolution of the Ottoman Empire, the office of the Grand Mufti was adopted in a number of countries across the Muslim world, often serving the role of providing religious support for government policies.

== History ==
Muftis are Muslim religious scholars who issue legal opinions (fatwas) interpreting sharia (Islamic law). The Ottoman Empire began the practice of giving official recognition and status to a single mufti, above all others, as the Grand Mufti. The Sheikh ul-Islam (or "grand mufti") of Istanbul had, since the late 16th century, come to be regarded as the head of the religious establishment. He was thus not only pre-eminent but bureaucratically responsible for the body of religious-legal scholars and gave legal rulings on important state policies such as the dethronement of rulers. This practice was subsequently borrowed and adapted by Egypt for the head of its Dar al-Ifta (House of Fatwas) from the mid-19th century. From there, the concept spread to other Muslim states, so that today there are approximately 16 countries with sizable Muslim populations which have a Grand Mufti. The relationship between the Grand Mufti of any given state and the state's rulers can vary considerably, both by region and by historical era.

== Election ==
=== India ===
The Grand Mufti of India is elected by the Sunni Barelvi Muslims and appointed by the Barelvi Sunni Muslims.

=== Brunei ===
The State Mufti of Brunei is nominated by the Sultan.

=== Jerusalem ===
Throughout the era of British colonialism, the British retained the institution of Grand Mufti in some Muslim areas under their control and accorded the Grand Mufti of Jerusalem the highest political stature in Palestine. During World War I (1914–1918), there were two competing Grand Muftis of Jerusalem, one endorsed by the British and one by the Ottoman Empire. When Palestine was under British rule, the Grand Mufti of Jerusalem was a position appointed by the British Mandate authorities. In the Palestinian National Authority, the administrative organization established to govern parts of the West Bank and Gaza Strip, the Grand Mufti is appointed by the president.

=== Malaysia ===
Malaysia has a unique system of collective mufti. Nine of the fourteen Malaysian states have their own constitutional monarchy; nine are ruled by their own constitutional monarch while the country is led by a monarch elected from the nine. These nine monarchs have authority over religious matters within their own states: therefore, each of these nine states have their own mufti who usually controls the Islamic Council or Islamic Department of the state. At the national level, a Fatwa Committee of the National Council for Islamic Religious Affairs (Malay: Majlis Fatwa Kebangsaan) has been formed under the Department of Islamic Advancement of Malaysia (Malay: Jabatan Kemajuan Islam Malaysia or JAKIM). JAKIM appoints five Muftis for the five states which do not have monarchs. The muftis of the nine monarchical states, together with the five officials appointed by JAKIM in the National Council of Fatwā, collectively issue fatāwā at the national level.

=== Mughal Empire ===
In the Mughal Empire, the Grand Mufti of India was a state official.

=== Ottoman Empire ===
In the Ottoman Empire, the Grand Mufti was a state official, and the Grand Mufti of Constantinople was the highest of these.

=== Saudi Arabia ===
The Grand Mufti of Saudi Arabia, with office created in 1953, is appointed by the King.

=== Tunisia ===
According to Article 78 of the 2014 Constitution, the Grand Mufti of Tunisia is appointed and can be dismissed by the President of the Republic.

== List of Grand Muftis ==
The list includes the names of currently appointed Grand Muftis who will take office on an appointed date and appointed by a governing committee.

State	Incumbent	Status	Term
Albania	Bujar Spahiu (26 February 1976 – )	Appointed Chairman of the Muslim Community of Albania (KMSH) by the Muslim Community of Albania	March 2019
Australia	Ibrahim Abu Mohammed ( – )	Appointed Grand Mufti of Australia by the Australian National Imams Council	September 2016
Bosnia and Herzegovina	(3 July 1964 – )	Appointed Grand Mufti of Bosnia and Herzegovina by the Islamic Community in Bosnia and Herzegovina	November 2026
Brunei	Abdul Aziz Juned (22 December 1941 – )	Appointed State Mufti of Brunei by the Sultan of Brunei, Hassanal Bolkiah	1 September 1994
Bulgaria	Mustafa Hadzhi (31 March 1962 – )	Appointed Chief Mufti of Bulgaria by the Supreme Muslim Council	1997 – 2005 (first term); 2005 –
Canada	Syed Soharwardy (1955 – )	Chairman of the Islamic Supreme Council of Canada (Grand Mufti of Canada)	2000
Caucasus region	Salman Musayev (26 August 1949 – )	Mufti of the Caucasus by the Caucasus Muslims Council	1980 – 1992 (first post); 1992 –
China	Xilalunding Chen Guangyuan	Chairman of the Islamic Association of China	November 2016
Egypt	Shawki Allam (12 August 1961 – )	Appointed Grand Mufti of Egypt by the Council of Senior Scholars of Al-Azhar and approved by the President of Egypt, Mohamed Morsi	February 2013
Ghana	Osman Nuhu Sharubutu (23 April 1919 – )	National Chief Imam of Ghana (De facto)	1993
Guinea	El Hadj Mamadou Saliou Camara ( – )	Grand Imam of Guinea (De facto)	
India	Sheikh Abubakr Ahmad (19 October 19 2019)	Appointed Grand Mufti of India by the Sunni Muslims of India	2019 –
Iraq	Mahdi al-Sumayda'i (1 July 1955 – )	Grand Mufti of the Iraqi Sunnis (de facto)	February 2014
Japan	Yahya Toshio Endo	Chairman of the Japan Muslim Association	2021
Jordan	Abdul Karim Khasawneh (1944 – )	Appointed Grand Mufti of the Kingdom of Jordan by the Cabinet of Jordan and Abdul Hafez Rabtah as Chief Islamic Justice of the Kingdom of Jordan	11 November 2019
Kazakhstan	Nauryzbay Kazhy Taganuly ( – )	Appointed Supreme Mufti of Kazakhstan by the Spiritual Administration of the Muslims of Kazakhstan as per nomination of former Supreme Mufti, Serikbai Kazhy Oraz	7 February 2020
Kosovo	Naim Ternava (7 January 1961 – )	Appointed Grand Mufti of Kosovo by the Islamic Community of Kosova	October 2003
Kyrgyzstan	Maksatbek Toktomushev (9 August 1973 – )	Appointed Mufti of Kyrgyzstan	2014
Lebanon	Abdul Latif Derian (3 April 1953 – )	Appointed Grand Mufti of Lebanon by the Higher Islamic Council	10 August 2014
Libya	Sadiq al-Gharyani (8 December 1942 – )	Appointed Grand Mufti of Libya by the National Transitional Council	May 2011
Lithuania	( – )	Grand Mufti of Lithuania (De facto)	
Macedonia	Shaqir Fetahu	Reis-ul-ulema of the Islamic Religious Community of Macedonia	2020
Malaysia	Ahmad Fauwaz Fadzil (12 September 1969 – )	Mufti of the Federal Territories (Website: muftiwp.gov.my)	16 May 2020
Malaysia	Dato Hj Yahya bin Ahmad	Mufti of Johor (Website: mufti.johor.gov.my)	13 November 2018
Malaysia	Syeikh Fadzil Awang	Mufti of Kedah (Website: mufti.kedah.gov.my)	20 July 2017
Malaysia	Mohamad Shukri Mohamad	Mufti of Kelantan (Website: muftikelantan.gov.my)	1 January 2008
Malaysia	Abdul Halim Tawil	Mufti of Malacca (Website: muftimelaka.gov.my)	
Malaysia	Faudzinaim Badaruddin	Mufti of Negeri Sembilan (Website: muftins.gov.my)	4 October 2023
Malaysia	Asmadi Mohamed Naim	Mufti of Pahang (Website: mufti.pahang.gov.my)	1 April 2024
Malaysia	Mohd Sukki Othman Noor	Mufti of Penang (Website: mufti.penang.gov.my)	1 July 2024
Malaysia	Wan Zahidi Wan Teh	Mufti of Perak (Website: mufti.perak.gov.my)	17 June 2022
Malaysia	Mohd Asri Zainul Abidin (1 January 1971 – )	Mufti of Perlis (Website: mufti.perlis.gov.my)	2 February 2015
Malaysia	Bungsu Aziz Jaafar	Mufti of Sabah (Website: mufti.sabah.gov.my)	10 August 2012
Malaysia	Kipli Yassin	Mufti of Sarawak (Website: muftinegeri.sarawak.gov.my)	
Malaysia	Anhar Opir	Mufti of Selangor (Website: muftiselangor.gov.my)	29 July 2022
Malaysia	Sabri Haron	Mufti of Terengganu (Website: mufti.terengganu.gov.my)	12 April 2021
Mali	Chérif Ousmane Madani Haïdara	Chairman of the High Islamic Council of Mali	April 2019
Mauritania	Ahmed Ould Murabit	Grand Mufti of Mauritania	
Montenegro	Rifat Fejzić ( – )	Reis-ul-ulema of the Islamic Community of Montenegro	
New Zealand	( – )	Appointed Grand Mufti of New Zealand	
Nigeria	Ibrahim Ibn Saleh al-Hussaini (1938 – )	Appointed Grand Mufti of Nigeria by the Supreme Council for Fatwa and Islamic Affairs in Nigeria	
Oman	Ahmed bin Hamad al-Khalili (27 July 1942 – )	Appointed Grand Mufti of the Sultanate of Oman by the Sultan of Oman, Qaboos bin Said	1975
Pakistan	Munib ur-Rahman	Grand Mufti of the Barelvi school in Pakistan	There is no single, officially designated "Grand Mufti of Pakistan" appointed by the government.
Pakistan	Taqi Usmani	Grand Mufti of the Deobandi school in Pakistan	There is no single, officially designated "Grand Mufti of Pakistan" appointed by the government.
Palestine	Muhammad Ahmad Hussein (10 March 1950 – )	Appointed Grand Mufti of Jerusalem by the President of the Palestinian National Authority, Mahmoud Abbas	July 2006
Poland	Tomasz Miśkiewicz (9 July 1977 – )	Appointed Mufti of the Republic of Poland by the Muslim Religious Union in the Republic of Poland	2004
Romania	Murat Yusuf (18 August 1977 – ) (Murād Yūsuf)	Grand Mufti of Romania	2005
Russia	Talgat Tadzhuddin (12 October 1948 – )	Appointed Grand Mufti of Russia by the Central Spiritual Administration of the Muslims of Russia	1992
Russia	Rawil Ğaynetdin (25 August 1959 – )	Appointed Grand Mufti of Russia by the Spiritual Administration of the Muslims of Russian Federation	2014
Saudi Arabia	Salih al‑Fawzan (1935 – )	Appointed Grand Mufti of Saudi Arabia by the King of Saudi Arabia, Salman of Saudi Arabia	22 October 2025
Serbia	Sead Nasufović (22 June 1979 – )	Appointed Mufti of Serbia by the Islamic Community of Serbia	July 2016
Singapore	Nazirudin Mohd Nasir	Appointed Mufti of the Republic of Singapore by the Majlis Ugama Islam Singapura, the statutory board of Ministry of Culture, Community and Youth	1 March 2020
South Africa	Mufti Mohamed Akbar Hazarvi	Appointed Mufti by the Sunni Ulama Council, Sunni Ulama Cape and Cape Town Ulama Board	20 June 2000-
South Korea	Mufti Muhammad Abdul Wahhab Zahid Al-Haq	Elected by the Muslim imams in Korea, and endorsed by the Korea Muslim Federation	
Syria	Osama al-Rifai (b. 1944)	Grand Mufti of Syria appointed by the Syrian opposition	November 2021
Tunisia	Othman Battikh (17 April 1941 – 25 October 2022)	Appointed Grand Mufti of Tunisia by the President of Tunisia, Zine El Abidine Ben Ali in 2008 and Beji Caid Essebsi in 2016	2008 – 5 January 2016 (resigned for haj pilgrimage in 2016); 12 January 2016 – (reappointed by the president after one week)
Turkey	Safi Arpaguş (b. 1967)	Appointed President of Directorate of Religious Affairs by the President of Turkey, Recep Tayyip Erdoğan, acting as Grand Mufti of the country.	18 September 2025
United Arab Emirates	( – )	Appointed Grand Mufti of Dubai by Islamic Affairs and Charitable Activities Department	
United States	( – )	Chairman of the Islamic Supreme Council of America (Grand Mufti of the United States)	
Uzbekistan	Nuriddin Xoliqnazarov (25 June 1968 – )	Grand Mufti of Uzbekistan	19 October 2021
Zimbabwe	Ismail ibn Musa Menk (b. 1975)	Grand Mufti of Zimbabwe	

== List of former Grand Muftis ==
State	Incumbent	Status	Term
Bosnia and Herzegovina	Mustafa Cerić (5 February 1952 – )	Appointed Grand Mufti of Bosnia and Herzegovina	April 1993 – November 2012
Brunei	Ismail Omar Abdul Aziz (1911 – 1993)	Appointed State Mufti of Brunei	1962–1994
India	ʽAbd al-Qadir Badayuni (21 August 1540 – 5 November 1615)	Appointed Grand Mufti of India by the Mughal emperor, Akbar, appointed him to the muftiat in 1574 where he spent much of his career.	16th century – 17th century
India	Shah Fazle Rasool Badayuni (1 July 1798 – 8 August 1872)	Appointed Grand Mufti of India by the final Mughal emperor, Bahadur Shah Zafar.	19th century
India	Kifayatullah Dehlawi (November 1882 – 31 December 1952) (Note: Urdu: مفتی اعظم محمد کفایت اللہ دہلوی Arabic: مفتی کفایت اللہ الدہلوی)		20th century
India	Amjad Ali Aazmi (November 1882 – 6 September 1948)	Elected as Grand Mufti of India by electoral college and appointed by the Islamic Community of India.	20th century
India	Mustafa Raza Khan Qadri (18 July 1892 – 11 November 1981)	Elected as Grand Mufti of India by electoral college and appointed by the Islamic Community of India.	20th century
India	Akhtar Raza Khan (23 November 1943 – 20 July 2018)	Elected as Grand Mufti of India by electoral college and appointed by the Islamic Community of India.	20th century – 20 July 2018
Japan	Sadiq Yoshio Imaizumi	Self-Appointed Chairman of the Japan Muslim Association	1953 – 1960
Japan	Umar Ryoichi Mita	Appointed Chairman of the Japan Muslim Association	1960 – 1962
Japan	Abdulkareem Atsuhira Saito	Appointed Chairman of the Japan Muslim Association	1962 – 1971
Japan	Abu Bakr Takeo Morimoto	Appointed Chairman of the Japan Muslim Association	1971 – 1974
Japan	Abdulmunir Shoji Watanabe	Appointed Chairman of the Japan Muslim Association	1974 – 1977
Japan	Omar Yojiro Iokibe	Appointed Chairman of the Japan Muslim Association	1977 – 1984
Japan	Abdul Salam Jiro Arimi	Appointed Chairman of the Japan Muslim Association	1984 – 1986
Japan	Zubeir Hakuro Suzuki	Appointed Chairman of the Japan Muslim Association	1986 – 1990
Japan	Khalid Mimasaka Higuchi	Appointed Chairman of the Japan Muslim Association	1990 – 2003
Japan	Amin Kimiaki Tokumasu	Appointed Chairman of the Japan Muslim Association	2003 – 2021
Malaysia	Zulkifli Mohamad Al-Bakri (16 January 1969 – )	Appointed Mufti of the Federal Territories	20 June 2014 – 16 May 2020
Macedonia	Sulejman Rexhepi (1947 – )	Reis-ul-ulema of the Islamic Religious Community of Macedonia	2006 – 27 May 2020
Palestine	Mohammed Tahir al-Husayni (1842 – 1908) (Hanafi)	Appointed Grand Mufti of Jerusalem by the Ottoman Empire	1869–1908
Palestine	Kamil al-Husayni (23 February 1867 – 31 March 1921) (Hanafi)	Appointed Grand Mufti of Jerusalem by the British Mandate	1908–1921
Palestine	As'ad Shukeiri (1860 – 1940) (Hanafi)	Appointed Qadi by the Ottoman Empire during the World War I.	1914–1918
Palestine	Amin al-Husseini (1 January 1895 – 4 July 1974) (Hanafi)	Appointed Grand Mufti of Jerusalem by the High Commissioner, Herbert Samuel	1921–1937
Palestine	Hussam ad-Din Jarallah (1884 – 6 March 1954)	Appointed Grand Mufti of Jerusalem by the King of Jordan, Abdullah I of Jordan	1948–1952
Palestine	Saad al-Alami (1911 – 6 February 1993)	Appointed Grand Mufti of Jerusalem by the Jerusalem Islamic Waqf	1952–1993
Palestine	Sulaiman Ja'abari (1912 – 1994)	Appointed Grand Mufti of Jerusalem by the President of the Palestinian National Authority, Yasser Arafat	1993–1994
Palestine	Ekrima Sa'id Sabri (1939 – )	Appointed Grand Mufti of Jerusalem by the President of the Palestinian National Authority, Yasser Arafat	October 1994 – July 2006
Philippines	Abuhuraira Udasan (3 March 1942 – 3 July 2023)	Grand Mufti of Bangsamoro	Until July 2023
Saudi Arabia	Muhammad ibn Ibrahim Al ash-Sheikh (24 July 1893, 1893 – 3 December 1969, 1969)	Appointed Grand Mufti of Saudi Arabia by the King of Saudi Arabia, Abdulaziz of Saudi Arabia	1953–1969
Saudi Arabia	Ibn Baz (22 November 1912 – 13 May 1999)	Appointed Grand Mufti of Saudi Arabia by the King of Saudi Arabia, Fahd of Saudi Arabia	1992–1999
Saudi Arabia	Abdulaziz Al Sheikh (30 November 1943 – 23 September 2025)	Appointed Grand Mufti of Saudi Arabia by the King of Saudi Arabia, Fahd of Saudi Arabia	1999–2025
Syria	Ahmed Kuftaro (1915 – 1 September 2004)	Appointed Grand Mufti of Syria	26 October 1964 – 1 September 2004
Syria	Ahmad Badreddin Hassoun (25 April 1949 – )	Appointed Grand Mufti of the Republic by the President of President of Syria, Bashar al-Assad	July 2005 – November 2021
Turkey	Ali Erbaş (10 September 1961 – )	Appointed President of Directorate of Religious Affairs by the President of Turkey, Recep Tayyip Erdoğan, acting as Grand Mufti of the country.	17 September 2017 – 17 September 2025
Uzbekistan	Usmankhan Alimov (1 January 1950 – 15 August 2021)	Grand Mufti of Uzbekistan	8 August 2006 – 15 August 2021

== See also ==
- Imam
- Muftiate
- List of Islamic muftiates
- Marja' and Ayatollah, roughly equivalent offices in Twelver Shi'ism
