= Saliou =

Saliou is an African given name. Notable people with the name include:

- Saliou Akadiri (born 1950), Beninese politician and diplomat
- El Hadj Mamadou Saliou Camara, the Grand Imam of Guinea
- Saliou Ciss (born 1989), Senegalese football player
- Saliou Coumbassa (1932–2003), Guinean politician and educator
- Saliou Diallo (born 1976), Guinean football goalkeeper
- Mamadou Saliou Diallo (born 1995), Guinean football forward
- Saliou Lassissi (born 1978), Ivorian football defender
- Serigne Saliou Mbacké (1915–2007), Grand Marabout (leader) of the Mouride movement in Senegal
- Saliou Niang (born 2004), Senegalese basketball player
- Saliou Sané (born 1992), German-Senegalese football forward
- Saliou Seck (born 1955), Senegalese sprinter at the 1984 Olympics
