= Mohammed Rashid Qabbani =

Grand Mufti of Lebanon (born 1942)

Sheikh Mohammed Rashid Qabbani (Arabic: محمد رشيد قباني, born September 15, 1942) is the former Grand Mufti of Lebanon and the most prominent Sunni Muslim cleric in the country. Qabbani succeeded former Grand Mufti Hassan Khaled. The current Grand Mufti of Lebanon is Abdul Latif Derian.

== Life and education ==
Qabbani was born in Beirut. He finished his secondary education in Sharia studies in Azahar Lebanon in 1962. He earned his License (equivalent to Bachelor of Arts) in Sharia and Law in 1966 from the College of Sharia and Law in Cairo, Egypt in 1966. For his post graduate studies, he received his masters in Comparative Fiqh in 1968 and a Doctorate in Comparative Fiqh in 1976 from the same college and university.

An alleged assassination attempt against Qabbani was foiled by Lebanese internal security forces on September 21, 2009, during Eid al-Fitr celebrations in Beirut.

== Religious and political views ==
In his 2014 Eid al-Fitr sermon, Qabbani called for jihad to "[liberate] Palestine's sacred land from Jewish foreign occupation."

In an interview broadcast on Al-Manar TV in September 2012, Qabbani condemned the anti-Islam film Innocence of Muslims as "intensely painful and disgusting" and stressed that broadcasting the movie was a step towards "instigating Christian-Islamic tension" during the Pope's visit to Lebanon. He also suggested that five million dollars were reportedly donated by Jews for its accomplishment.

Qabbani is against the legalization of civil marriage in Lebanon. On January 28, 2013, Qabbani made a fatwa declaring any Muslim politician who supports the introduction of civil marriage, as an apostate.

In his 2014 Eid al-Fitr sermon Qabbani condemned the persecution of Christians by ISIL, stating "We Muslims, will not rest until our Christian brothers, notably in the Levant, are able to live in peace, security and tranquility."

== Academic and religious positions ==
He occupied many functions including:

- Director General of the Islamic Wakf (1978)
- Professor of Islamic law at the Faculty of Law, Arab University of Beirut (1977–89)
- Professor of Islamic Teachings at the College of Higher Islamic Studies of the Islamic Makassed Wakf (1982–89)
- Member of "The Fiqh (Islamic Jurisprudence) Council" (مجمع الفقه الإسلامي) part of Muslim World League (Rabitat Al Aalam al Islami, in Arabic رابطة العالم الإسلامي) in Makkah al Moukarramah since 1979.
- Secretary of Fatwa in Lebanon since 1984.
- Appointed by the Higher Council of Islamic Sharia on June 29, 1989, to act as Grand mufti of the Lebanese Republic following the death of Grand Mufti Sheikh Hassan Khaled. This provisional status continued until December 28, 1996.
- From December 29, 1996, officially elected Grand Mufti of the Lebanese Republic. In addition to his duties as Mufti, he is the president of the following entities and committees.
  - Higher Islamic Sharia Council (المجلس الشرعي الإسلامي الأعلى)
  - Higher Sharia Courts Council (مجلس القضاء الشرعي الأعلى)
  - Higher Reference for Islamic Awqaf in Lebanon (المرجع الأعلى للأوقاف الإسلامية في لبنان)
  - President of Dr. Mohammed Khaled Social Institutions (مؤسسات الدكتور محمد خالد الاجتماعية)
  - Honorary President of Beirut Islamic University (جامعة بيروت الإسلامية)

== Publications ==
- The right of divorce in Islamic Sharia - Comparative study (حق الطلاق في الشريعة الإسلامية - بحث مقارن)
- The limits of adultery in Islamic Sharia - Comparative study (حد الزِنا في الشريعة الإسلامية - بحث مقارن)
- Pandemics and Emergency Conditions - Comparative Study (الجوائح ونظرية الظروف الطارئة في الشريعة الإسلامية - بحث مقارن)
- General rules of the Islamic Economy (القواعد العامة للاقتصاد الإسلامي)
- The Status of Islamic Fiqh in International Rights (مكانة الفقه الإسلامي في الحقوق الدولية)
- Study of "Wisdom in God's Creations" by Abi Hamed al Ghazali" - A report (الحكمة في مخلوقات الله للإمام أبي حامد الغزالي – تحقيق)
- Paper Money and Its Economic Value (العملة الورقية وقيمتها الاقتصادية)
