= Coumbassa =

Coumbassa is an African surname. Notable people with the surname include:

- Mohamed Coumbassa (born 1995), Guinean football midfielder
- Saliou Coumbassa (1932–2003), Guinean politician and educator
