= Mustafa Hadzhi =

Sunni islamic scholar

Mufti Mustafa Alish Hadzhi

Grand Mufti of Bulgaria
- In office 2005

Personal life
- Born: 31 March 1962 (age 64)
- Education: New Bulgarian University

Religious life
- Religion: Islam
- Denomination: Sunni
- Jurisprudence: Hanafi
- Creed: Maturidi

Muslim leader
- Influenced: Abu Hanifa, Abdul Qadir Gilani, Mu'in al-Din Chishti, Nizamuddin Auliya, Al-Suyuti, Ibn Abidin, Qadi Iyad, Ahmed Raza Khan Barelvi, Akhtar Raza Khan

Mustafa Alish Hadzhi (born 31 March 1962) is an Islamic scholar, author, and the current Grand Mufti of Bulgaria. He was listed in The 500 Most Influential Muslims, compiled by the Royal Islamic Strategic Studies Centre.

== Early life ==
Mustafa Hadzhi born in Draginovo in the region of Pazardzhik, Bulgaria.
