= Muslim Council of Elders =

Islamic organizations in the United Arab Emirates

The Muslim Council of Elders
- مجلس حكماء المسلمين
- Formation: July 19, 2014; 12 years ago
- Type: Independent international, non-profit organization
- Purpose: Human coexistence, global peace, interfaith dialogue
- Headquarters: Abu Dhabi, United Arab Emirates
- Region served: Worldwide
- Secretary General: Mohamed Abdelsalam
- Chairman: The Grand Imam of Al-Azhar Ahmed el-Tayeb
- Website: muslim-elders.com

The Muslim Council of Elders (Arabic: مجلس حكماء المسلمين) is an independent international, non-profit organization founded on 21 Ramadan 1435 AH / 19 July 2014 to promote peace, tolerance, and coexistence by uniting Muslim scholars, experts, and dignitaries. Chaired by Prof. Dr. Ahmed Al-Tayeb, the Grand Imam of al-Azhar, and headquartered in Abu Dhabi, the Council is composed of a select group of scholars, dignitaries, and intellectuals from across the Muslim world.

== Background ==
The Muslim Council of Elders was founded in 2014 in Abu Dhabi, United Arab Emirates, as an independent international organization to promote peace, advance the values of dialogue, tolerance, and human coexistence, and defend the causes of the Muslim world. It aims to promote communication and dialogue with followers of other religions and cultures, while enhancing the role of faith leaders and representatives in encouraging mutual understanding and peaceful coexistence.

In 2019, the Council established a publishing house dedicated to producing and translating works that promote tolerance, coexistence, and the rejection of hatred, extremism, and Islamophobia. The publishing house also republishes classical Islamic texts, works by specialized authors, and translates publications into Arabic and other languages. It participates in international book fairs, organizes cultural events and seminars, and has published more than 250 titles in multiple languages across various intellectual fields.

In October 2020, the Muslim Council of Elders established the Al-Hokama Centre for Peace Research, an independent international research institution. The centre aims to address gaps in peace studies and related fields within the Muslim world. It brings together a specialized team of researchers and administrators and provides both theoretical and practical frameworks to advance the message of peace worldwide.

The Council has been chaired by Professor Dr. Ahmed Al-Tayeb, Grand Imam of Al-Azhar, since its establishment. Judge Mohamed Abdelsalam has served as Secretary-General of the Council since March 2022, overseeing its projects and initiatives and coordinating among its members and bodies. The Council is also supported by an Executive Office composed of specialized experts and qualified professionals responsible for implementing its objectives.

The Council aims to safeguard the Muslim world from conflict and division by encouraging individuals, communities, and states to resolve disputes through peaceful means and dialogue. It seeks to raise awareness among Muslims of the challenges facing the Muslim world, while countering intolerance, extremism, violence, marginalization, moral decline, and atheism. The Council also strives to present an accurate image of Islam and Muslims, highlighting Islamic values in engagement with others both within Muslim societies and beyond, and promoting the principles of good neighbourliness and mutual respect among peoples on the basis of justice.

=== Regional offices ===
The headquarters of the Muslim Council of Elders has been in Abu Dhabi, the capital of the United Arab Emirates, since its establishment. The Council also maintains several regional offices in several countries, including Indonesia, Malaysia, Pakistan, and Kazakhstan. These regional chapters aim to broaden the Council's engagement with Muslim communities and to support its mission of promoting dialogue, tolerance, and harmonious coexistence.

=== Initiatives ===
East–West Dialogue: An initiative launched by Prof. Ahmed Al-Tayeb, aimed at advancing intellectual dialogue and mutual understanding between scholars from Eastern and Western traditions.

Intra-Islamic Dialogue: Introduced by the Muslim Council of Elders in response to a call by Prof. Ahmed Al-Tayeb during the Bahrain Dialogue Forum in 2022, this initiative aims to foster unity within the Muslim world.

International Peace Convoys: Initiated in 2015 by the Muslim Council of Elders in cooperation with Al-Azhar, this program sends scholars and distinguished graduates from Al-Azhar to countries where they are fluent in the local language.

Emerging Peacemakers Forum: Hosted for the first time in 2018 by the Muslim Council of Elders in partnership with Al-Azhar and the Church of England, this initiative trains young people from diverse religions and cultures in coexistence and peace building.

Faith Pavilion at COP Conferences: First introduced at COP28, the Faith Pavilion was established by the Muslim Council of Elders as a global platform to foster dialogue among faith leaders and policymakers on climate issues.

100 Questions Project: This project seeks to address and clarify common misconceptions about Islam, eliminate confusion, and foster a culture of dialogue, peace, tolerance, and justice. It compiles and responds to one hundred of the most pressing questions raised by Muslims and non-Muslims regarding Islamic principles and practices.

=== Documents ===
The Abu Dhabi Document on Human Fraternity: The document was signed in Abu Dhabi on 4 February 2019 by the Grand Imam Prof. Ahmed Al-Tayeb and Pope Francis, then head of the Catholic Church, under the patronage of Sheikh Mohamed bin Zayed Al Nahyan, President of the United Arab Emirates. The United Nations General Assembly designated the date of its signing as the International Day of Human Fraternity. It has since been incorporated into educational curricula in several countries and institutions, and Timor-Leste has adopted it as a national charter.

The Code of Twenty: A professional and ethical charter issued by the Arab Media Gathering for Human Fraternity on 4 February 2020, coinciding with the first anniversary of the signing of the Document on Human Fraternity.The code contains twenty articles affirming the role of media in promoting coexistence and tolerance while rejecting hatred and extremism.

The Call of Conscience – Abu Dhabi Joint Statement for Climate: Ahead of the 28th UN Climate Change Conference (COP28), the Muslim Council of Elders, in cooperation with the United Nations and the UAE Ministry of Tolerance and Coexistence, convened a global summit of religious leaders to discuss the role of religions in addressing climate change.

The Call for the People of the Qibla Charter: A unifying declaration of principles aimed at advancing dialogue and understanding among the various schools of Islamic thought.

=== Events ===
The Muslim Council of Elders has co-organized several conferences and forums. Notable events include:

- 2016: International Symposium on The Role of Religions in Promoting Peace and Rejecting Violence and Hatred.
- 2016: International Symposium on Towards a Harmonious and Integrated World.
- 2017: Conference of the Muslim Council of Elders on Achieving Peace in Burma.
- 2017: World Peace Conference.
- 2017: Conference on Freedom and Citizenship: Diversity and Complementarity.
- 2018: World Conference in Support of Jerusalem.
- 2018: International Symposium on Islam and the West: Diversity and Complementarity.
- 2019: Global Conference on Human Fraternity.
- 2020: Arab Media Gathering for Human Fraternity.
- 2021: Conference on Media Professionals Against Hatred.
- 2022: Bahrain Dialogue Forum.
- 2023: Global Summit of Religious Leaders for Climate – Abu Dhabi.
- 2024: Global Summit of Religious Leaders – Baku.
- 2025: Intra-Islamic Dialogue Conference – Kingdom of Bahrain.

== Notable members ==
=== Current Members ===
Name	Country	Position
Prof. Dr. Ahmed Al-Tayeb	Egypt	Grand Imam of Al-Azhar Al-Sharif and Chairman of the Muslim Council of Elders
Sheikh Abdullah bin Bayyah	Mauritania	President of the UAE Fatwa Council, and Chairman of the Abu Dhabi Forum for Peace
Sheikh Abdullah bin Mohammad bin Rashed Al Khalifa	Kingdom of Bahrain	President of the Supreme Council for Islamic Affairs in the Kingdom of Bahrain
Prince Ghazi bin Muhammad bin Talal	Jordan	Chairman of the Board of Trustees of the Royal Aal al-Bayt Institute for Islamic Thought
Prof. Dr. Abdullah Nassif	Kingdom of Saudi Arabia	Former Secretary-General of the Muslim World League
Prof. Dr. Hassan Abdullatif Al-Shafei	Egypt	Member of Al-Azhar's Council of Senior Scholars; President of the Union of Arab Scientific Language Academies; former Chairman of the Academy of the Arabic Language
Prof. Dr. Muhammad Quraish Shihab	Indonesia	Former Minister of Religious Affairs in the Republic of Indonesia
Prof. Dr. Mustafa Ben Hamza	Kingdom of Morocco	President of the Ulema Council of Oujda for the Eastern Region in the Kingdom of Morocco
Sheikh Dr Al-Sharif Ibrahim Saleh Al-Hussaini	Federal Republic of Nigeria	Head of the Fatwa Authority at the Supreme Council for Islamic Affairs and Chairman of the Fatwa Committee of the Jama'at Nasril Islam (JNI) in Nigeria
Prof. Dr. Prof. Dr. Koutoubou Mustapha Sano	Republic of Guinea	Minister of Religious Affairs, Minister of International Cooperation, former Diplomatic Advisor to the President of the Republic of Guinea, and Secretary-General of the International Islamic Fiqh Academy in Jeddah
Sheikh-ul-Islam Allahshukur Pashazadeh	Republic of Azerbaijan	Spiritual Leader of Muslims in Azerbaijan and the Caucasus Region
Dr. Ahmed bin Abdulaziz Al-Haddad	United Arab Emirates	Senior Mufti, Director of the Ifta Department at the Islamic Affairs and Charitable Activities Department in Dubai (IACAD), and Member of the UAE Fatwa Council
Sheikh Sayyid Ali Al-Amin	Republic of Lebanon	Senior Religious Authority
Senator Datuk Senator Dr. Zulkifli Mohamad Al-Bakri	Malaysia	Member of the Malaysian Senate and former Minister of Islamic Affairs of Malaysia
President Mahamadou Issoufou	Republic of Niger	Former President of Niger; Recipient of the 2020 Ibrahim Prize for Achievement in African Leadership
Sheikh Nuriddin Kholiknazarov	Republic of Uzbekistan	Head of the Religious Administration of Muslims of Uzbekistan
Sheikh Ahmad Al-Noor Mohammad Al-Hilw	Republic of Chad	Grand Mufti of the Republic of Chad
Sheikh Rawi Ainuddin	Russia	Grand Mufti and Head of the Religious Administration of Muslims of Russia

=== Former Members ===
Name	Country	Position
The late Field Marshal Abdelrahman Suwar Al-Dahab	Republic of Sudan	Former President of the Republic of Sudan
The late Prof. Dr. Mahmoud Hamdi Zakzouk	Egypt	Member of Al-Azhar's Council of Senior Scholars and former Minister of Endowments (Awqaf)
