= Ahmed bin Hamad al-Khalili =

Grand Mufti of the Sultanate of Oman since 1975

Ahmad Al-Khalili
- أحمد بن حمد الخليلي
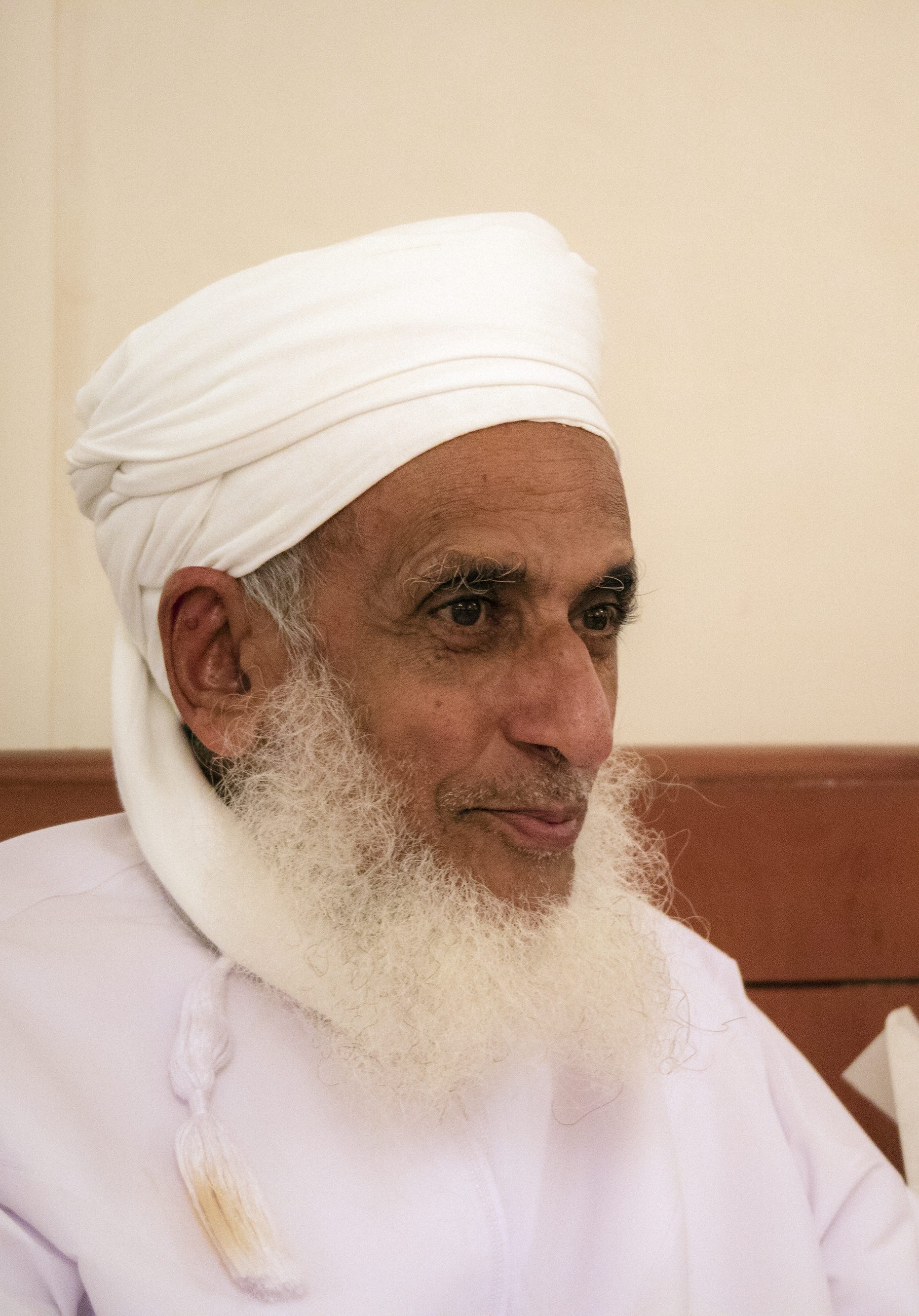
- Al-Khalili in 2017

Grand Mufti of the Sultanate of Oman
- Incumbent
- Assumed office 27 November 1975
- Preceded by: Ibrahim ibn Saʻid ʻAbri

Personal life
- Born: 12 Rajab 1361 AH | 27 July 1942 (age 84) Zanzibar, Muscat and Oman
- Citizenship: Sultanate of Oman
- Era: Modern
- Region: Arabian Peninsula
- Main interest(s): Fiqh, Aqidah

Religious life
- Religion: Islam
- Denomination: Ahl al-Haqq wa-l-Istiqāmah
- Jurisprudence: Ibadi
- Creed: Ibadi
- Movement: Ibadism

Shaykh Ahmad bin Hamad Al-Khalili (NP) (Arabic: أحمد بن حمد الخليلي; born 27 July 1942) is the Grand Mufti of the Sultanate of Oman.

== Life ==
Ahmed bin Hamad Al-Khalili was born on the island of Zanzibar on 27 July 1942, when Zanzibar was still under the rule of the al-Said sultans who originated from Oman. His tribal home is the town of Bahla.

He was appointed Director of the Ministry of Justice, Islamic Affairs and Awqaf and Islamic Affairs, and in 1395 hijri (1975 CE), a royal decree appointed him the Grand Mufti of the Sultanate of Oman, the highest Islamic authority in Oman, after the death of the scholar Ibrahim bin Said Al Abri.

== Opinions ==
The Grand Mufti appears regularly on TV, where he answers the public's questions on Islam. He urged the government to ban alcohol in Oman, one of the more liberal states in the Arabian Peninsula.

However, he is a strong advocate for religious tolerance and works hard to ensure harmony between the different religious schools of thought in Oman.

Al-Khalili signed the Amman Message, which gives a broad foundation for defining Muslim orthodoxy.

In August 2021, he congratulated the Taliban for “the clear victory and the grand conquering of the aggressor invaders, and we also congratulate ourselves and the entire Islamic nation for the fulfillment of God’s sincere promise”.

== Awards ==
- Nishan-e-Pakistan (2022)
- Nishan-e-Imtiaz (2022)
