= Mohamed Abdelsalam (Egyptian judge) =

Egyptian judge and legal expert

- محمد عبد السلام
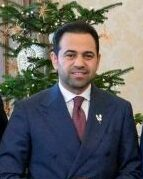
- Judge Mohamed Abdelsalam in 2025

Secretary-General of the Muslim Council of Elders
- Incumbent
- Assumed office March 2022

Secretary-General of the Zayed Award for Human Fraternity
- Incumbent
- Assumed office February 2019

Legal and Legislative Advisor to the Grand Imam of Al-Azhar
- In office August 2011 – December 2018

Secretary-General of the Higher Committee of Human Fraternity
- In office September 2019 – 2024

Judge at the Egyptian State Council
- In office 2011–2021

Personal details
- Born: Mohamed Mahmoud Abdelsalam Abdellatif; December 31, 1980 (age 45) Dakahlia Governorate, Egypt
- Education: Al-Azhar University (MA)

Mohamed Mahmoud Abdelsalam Abdellatif (Arabic: محمد محمود عبد السلام عبد اللطيف, born December 31, 1980; Dakahlia, Egypt), commonly known as Judge Mohamed Abdelsalam, is an Egyptian judge, legal expert, and a public figure. He currently serves as Secretary-General of the Muslim Council of Elders and Secretary-General of the Zayed Award for Human Fraternity. He previously held the position of Legal and Legislative Advisor to His Eminence Ahmed el-Tayeb, Grand Imam of Al-Azhar, for 8 years.

Abdelsalam is the Co-President of Religions for Peace, a member of Al-Azhar's Center for Interreligious Dialogue, a member of the Board of Trustees of the King Hamad Global Centre for Peaceful Coexistence, a member of the Global Leadership Council for Sustainable Development, and Secretary-General of the Higher Committee of Human Fraternity.

== Early life and education ==
Abdelsalam was born on December 31, 1980, in the village of Nub Tareef, located in the Dakahlia Governorate of Egypt. He received his higher education at Al-Azhar University, where he enrolled in the Faculty of Sharia and Law. He earned a bachelor's degree in Islamic Sharia and Law and went on to complete his postgraduate studies, obtaining a Master's degree with a specialization in comparative public law and Islamic Sharia.

== Judicial career ==
Abdelsalam held several judicial positions in Egypt, beginning with his appointment as a deputy prosecutor at the Administrative Prosecution Authority by presidential decree in the 2005 cohort. In 2009, he was appointed Deputy Prosecutor for Culture, Media, and Tourism Affairs, followed by a post in 2010 as Deputy Prosecutor for Al-Azhar and Religious Endowments. In 2011, he served as Deputy Prosecutor at the Presidency of the Republic. He also served as the official spokesperson for the Administrative Prosecution Authority until his resignation, which came after being appointed a judge at the Egyptian State Council in 2011.

== Advisor to Grand Imam of Al-Azhar ==
In 2011, Abdelsalam was seconded by the Egyptian Ministry of Justice pursuant to ministerial Decree No. 3791 of 2011, as Legal Advisor to the Grand Imam of Al-Azhar His Eminence Professor Dr. Ahmed el-Tayeb, for matters relating to Legal Affairs and the Ombudsman Office. He served in this role until his resignation on September 30, 2018. Commenting on Abdelsalam's service, Dr. Ahmed el-Tayeb, remarked: "He was a model of the distinguished Egyptian judiciary competent, honest, and diligent. He sincerely and selflessly contributed to several important national milestones, particularly through his strong representation of Al-Azhar in the constitution-drafting committees, where he passionately defended national values, Al-Azhar's prominent standing, and its noble religious principles."

Abdelsalam was appointed a member of the higher committee tasked with drafting Al-Azhar's Law, which included the re-establishment of the Council of Senior Scholars under Law No. 13 of 2012. He also served as legal advisor to the Council of Senior Scholars throughout his secondment at Al-Azhar. Furthermore, he was nominated by the Grand Imam to represent Al-Azhar in Egypt's Constituent Assembly that drafted the 2012 Constitution and was again nominated to serve in the 50-member Constitutional Committee for the 2014 amendments.

In 2018, he was appointed a member of the Board of Trustees of the Egyptian Family House, a joint initiative of Al-Azhar and the Coptic Orthodox Church by a decision issued jointly by the Grand Imam of Al-Azhar and Pope Tawadros II, Pope of Alexandria and Patriarch of the See of St. Mark.

Abdelsalam participated in drafting and launching several Al-Azhar declarations that addressed humanitarian and Islamic issues. These were introduced during international conferences held by Al-Azhar between 2011 and 2018, including the Al-Azhar Document on the Future of Egypt (June 20, 2011), the Al-Azhar Document Against Violence (31 January 2013), the Al-Azhar Declaration on Citizenship and Coexistence (March 1, 2017), and the Al-Azhar Global Declaration in Support of Jerusalem (January 2018). He also participated in the drafting of the Document on Human Fraternity, which was launched in Abu Dhabi on February 4, 2019.

== Secretary-General of the Muslim Council of Elders ==
Abdelsalam has served as Secretary-General of the Muslim Council of Elders since March 2022. During his tenure as Secretary-General, the council has organized notable international conferences and launched several initiatives, including the East-West Dialogue Initiative, the contributions to the Document on Human Fraternity that was launched in Abu Dhabi, efforts to foster intra-Islamic dialogue, the International Peace Convoys and Ramadan Missions, the establishment of the Faith Pavilion at the 2023 United Nations Climate Change Conference (COP28) in Dubai and its continuation at the 2024 United Nations Climate Change Conference (COP29) in Azerbaijan, and the launch of the Emerging Peacemakers Forum.

== Secretary-General of the Zayed Award for Human Fraternity ==
Abdelsalam has held the position of Secretary-General of the Zayed Award for Human Fraternity since its establishment in 2019. In its inaugural edition, the award was given honorarily to Pope Francis and the Grand Imam of Al-Azhar, Ahmed Al-Tayeb, in recognition of their signing of the Document on Human Fraternity. The notable initiatives under the award include the Human Fraternity Fellowship Program, the Youth Summit on Compassion and Human Fraternity, the Global Village Youth Townhall, the first Latin American Youth Workshop, the Sounds of Human Fraternity Program, the Annual Human Fraternity Roundtable, and the Expressions of Human Fraternity Initiative.

== Secretary-General of the Higher Committee for Human Fraternity ==
Abdelsalam was appointed Secretary-General of the Higher Committee of Human Fraternity at its inception. Among the notable initiatives launched during his tenure as Secretary-General of the Committee were the Zayed Award for Human Fraternity, an independent global award with a prize of $1 million; the International Day of Human Fraternity, officially recognized by the United Nations General Assembly on December 21, 2020 and observed annually on February 4; the Human Fraternity Education and Leadership for Peace Program; and the International Day of Prayer for Humanity.

== Honors and recognitions ==
In 2018, Abdelsalam was awarded the Medal of the Supreme Constitutional Court of Egypt by the President of the Court. In 2019, he was conferred the Order of Pope Pius IX Knight Commander by Pope Francis, making him the first Arab Muslim to receive such an accolade from the head of the Catholic Church. In 2022, Abdelsalam was awarded the Astana Medal by President Kassym-Jomart Tokayev of Kazakhstan. In the same year, he was granted an Honorary Professorship by the Kazakh University of the Humanities and Law (KAZGUU).

In 2023, he was bestowed the Shapagat Order by the President of Kazakhstan, conferred an Honorary Professorship by the Eurasian National University in Kazakhstan and was awarded the Medal of Religious Tolerance by the Republic of Uzbekistan, the first time this honor was presented to a non-Uzbek national. The following year, he was unanimously elected Goodwill Ambassador by the General Secretariat of the Congress of Leaders of World and Traditional Religions. Abdelsalam was also awarded the Community Service Medal by the Minister of Interior of the United Arab Emirates.
