= Zulkifli Mohamad Al-Bakri =

Malaysian politician

Yang Berbahagia Dato' Seri Zulkifli Mohamad Al-Bakri PJN DGPN PMW
- ذوالكفل محمد البكري

Minister in the Prime Minister's Department (Religious Affairs)
- In office 10 March 2020 – 16 August 2021
- Monarch: Abdullah
- Prime Minister: Muhyiddin Yassin
- Deputy: Ahmad Marzuk Shaary
- Preceded by: Mujahid Yusof Rawa
- Succeeded by: Idris Ahmad
- Constituency: Senator

Senator Appointed by the Yang di-Pertuan Agong
- In office 10 March 2020 – 9 March 2023
- Monarch: Abdullah
- Prime Minister: Muhyiddin Yassin (2020–2021); Ismail Sabri Yaakob (2021–2022); Anwar Ibrahim (2022–2023)

7th Mufti of the Federal Territories of Malaysia
- In office 23 June 2014 – 9 March 2020
- Monarchs: Abdul Halim (2014–2016); Muhammad V (2016–2019); Abdullah (2019–2020)
- Prime Minister: Najib Razak (2014–2018); Mahathir Mohamad (2018–2020); Muhyiddin Yassin (2020)
- Minister: Jamil Khir Baharom (2014–2018); Mujahid Yusof Rawa (2018–2020)
- Preceded by: Wan Zahidi Wan Teh
- Succeeded by: Luqman Abdullah

Faction represented in Dewan Negara
- 2020–2023: Independent

Personal details
- Born: 16 January 1969 (age 57) Kampung Gong Pauh, Kemaman, Terengganu
- Citizenship: Malaysia
- Education: Islamic University of Madinah; Al-Ulum Al-Islamiah Wa Al-Arabiah University, Damascus; Universiti Sains Malaysia (PhD)
- Website: Zulkifli al-Bakri
- Zulkifli Mohamad Al-Bakri on Facebook

Zulkifli Mohamad Al-Bakri (Jawi: ذوالكفل محمد البكري; born 16 January 1969) is a Malaysian Islamic scholar who served as Minister in the Prime Minister's Department in charge of Religious Affairs in the Perikatan Nasional (PN) administration under former Prime Minister Muhyiddin Yassin from March 2020 to August 2021, Senator from March 2020 to March 2023 and 7th Mufti of the Federal Territories from June 2014 to his political appointments in March 2020. He is currently a member of the Muslim Council of Elders based in Abu Dhabi, United Arab Emirates, led by Sheikh Dr. Ahmed el-Tayeb, and a member of The Assembly of Muslim Jurists of America. He remains actively involved in presenting papers at national and international levels. Zulkifli is also the founder of Federal Territories Islamic Religious Council's Pondok Moden Al-'Abaqirah, a religious educational institute.

== Education ==
=== Educational Background ===
He was born in Kampung Gong Pauh, Kemaman, Terengganu, on January 16, 1969, and attended Sekolah Kebangsaan Rengas Bekah, Kuala Terengganu (1976–1981). He continued his education at Sekolah Menengah Agama Sultan Zainal Abidin (SMASZA), Ladang, Kuala Terengganu (1982–1984) before pursuing his studies at the Thanawi level at Sekolah Menengah Agama (Atas) Sultan Zainal Abidin (SMAASZA), Batu Buruk, Kuala Terengganu (1985–1988).

Subsequently, Zulkifli pursued a bachelor's degree in Shariah at the Islamic University of Madinah (1989–1993). He then furthered his education with a master's degree in Shariah at the University of Islamic and Arabic Sciences, Damascus, Syria (1994–1997), under the supervision of Sheikh Prof. Dr. Mustafa al-Khin.

He completed his Ph.D at the School of Humanities, Universiti Sains Malaysia (2002–2004), under the supervision of Prof. Dr. Radzi Othman. His research topic was "The Institution of the Mufti and Fatwa: An Analysis of the Enactments and Selected Fatwas of Negeri Sembilan".

== Honours ==
=== Honours of Malaysia ===
- Malaysia
  - Commander of the Order of Meritorious Service (PJN) – Datuk (2019)
- Federal Territory (Malaysia)
  - Commander of the Order of the Territorial Crown (PMW) – Datuk (2015)
- Penang
  - Commander of the Order of the Defender of State (DGPN) – Dato' Seri (2018)
