= Mufti of Johor =

- Incumbent; Dato' Haji Yahya Ahmad since 13 November 2019
- Johor Mufti Department
- Style: Sahibus Samahah
- Inaugural holder: Datuk Syed Salim Ahmad Al Attas
- Formation: 1895; 131 years ago
- Website: Mufti of Johor

Mufti of Johor State Government is the religious authority responsible of giving opinions (fatwa) on Islamic legal matters and social affairs in Johor. He is the head of the state's Mufti Department. During the early establishment of this position, the Mufti headed the Religious Assembly Council (Malay: Majlis Mesyuarat Agama) at the state level, which was founded after the Constitution of Johor was enacted in 1895.

The incumbent is Dato' Haji Yahya Ahmad, who was conferred the title on 13 November 2018 by the Sultan of Johor.

== History ==
The presence of Mufti institution in Johor can be traced back as early as the Johor-Riau Malay Sultanate era. Between 1885 and 1941, some of the Mufti's administrative roles on Islamic matters in the state included Syariah Court Judge, Vice President of the Religious Council, managing Fiqh matters according to mazhab Syafi'i, coordinating prayers for Sultan's birthday, writing Friday sermon, as well as examining the Qadi, Vice Qadi, dan Imam positions.

== List of Muftis ==
The Muftis of Johor, in chronological order, are:

No.	Name	Term of Office
1	Datuk Syed Salim Ahmad Al Attas	1896 – 1899
2	Datuk Haji Abdullah Musa	1899 – 1907
3	Dato’ Syed Abdul Kadir Mohsin al-Attas	1904 – 1933
4	Dato’ Syed Alwe Tahir al-Hadad	1934 – 1941
5	Dato’ Haji Hassan Yunos	1941 – 1947
6	Dato’ Syed Alwe Tahir al-Hadad	1947 – 1961
7	Tan Sri Dato’ Abdul Jalil Hassan	1961 – 1964
8	Dato’ Haji Rahim Yunus	1965 – 1977
9	Dato’ Syed Alwe Abdullah al-Hadad	1977 – 1981
10	Dato’ Haji Ahmad Awang	1981 – 1999
11	Dato’ Haji Nooh Gadut	1999 – 2008
12	Dato’ Haji M. Tahrir Dato’ Haji Samsudin	2008 – 2018
13	Dato’ Haji Yahya Ahmad	since November 2018
