= Abdul Aziz Juned =

Bruneian poet and politician (born 1941)

Yang Berhormat Pehin Datu Seri Maharaja Dato Paduka Seri Setia Abdul Aziz bin Juned Dr. Ustaz Haji Awang
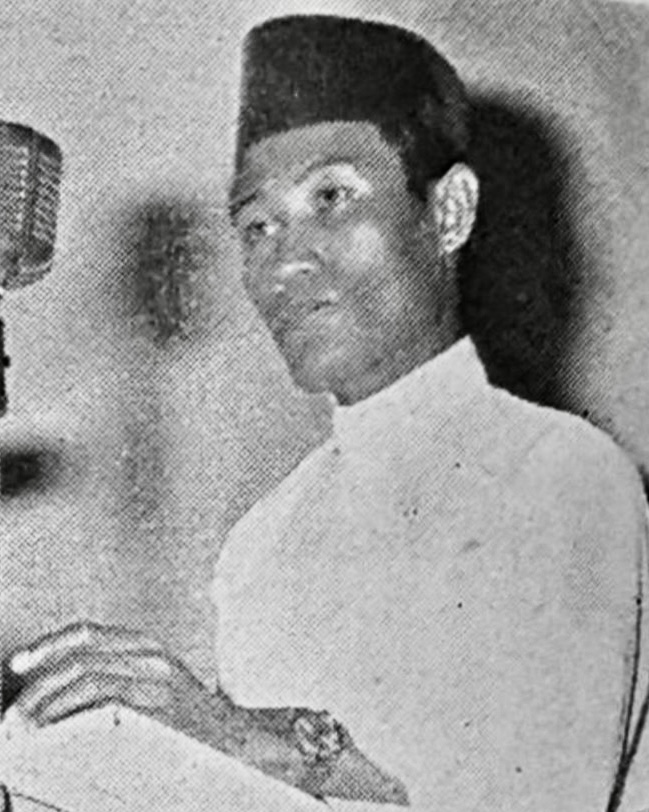
- Abdul Aziz Juned in 1971

2nd State Mufti of Brunei
- Incumbent
- Assumed office 1 September 1994
- Monarch: Hassanal Bolkiah
- Deputy: Japar bin Haji Mat Dain @ Maidin
- Preceded by: Ismail Omar Abdul Aziz

Member of the Legislative Council of Brunei
- Incumbent
- Assumed office 1994

Member of the Privy Council
- Incumbent
- Assumed office 17 April 1984

Personal details
- Born: December 22, 1941 (age 84) Kampong Setia Pahlawan Lama, Bandar Seri Begawan, Brunei
- Spouse: Datin Hajah Maznah binti Haji Mohammad
- Children: 3 (2 sons, 1 daughter)
- Education: Kolej Islam Malaya; Al-Azhar University (BA)
- Occupation: Ulama; poet; politician
- Website: www.mufti.gov.bn

Religious life
- Religion: Islam
- Denomination: Sunni
- Jurisprudence: Shafi'i
- Creed: Ahl as-Sunna wa l-Jamāʻah (Ash'ari-Maturidi)

Abdul Aziz bin Juned (born 22 December 1941), also known by his pen name Adi Rumi, is a Bruneian aristocrat, poet and politician. Serving as the State Mufti of Brunei since 1994, his appointment marked a pivotal moment in the country's Islamic governance, aligning with a strengthened focus on state-led Islamisation. Throughout his career, Abdul Aziz has been a staunch advocate for the application of Syariah law as a deterrent to crime and has played a key role in supporting the Syariah Penal Code Order (SPCO) 2013, underscoring his influence in shaping Brunei's Islamic legal framework.

== Early life and education ==
Abdul Aziz bin Juned was born on 22 December 1941 in Kampong Setia Pahlawan Lama, a village within Kampong Ayer. He received his early education in Brunei before continuing his studies at Madrasah Aljunied Al-Islamiah in Singapore in 1955, Kolej Islam Malaya in 1962, and Al-Azhar University in Cairo, where he graduated with a Bachelor of Arts in 1968.

== Career ==
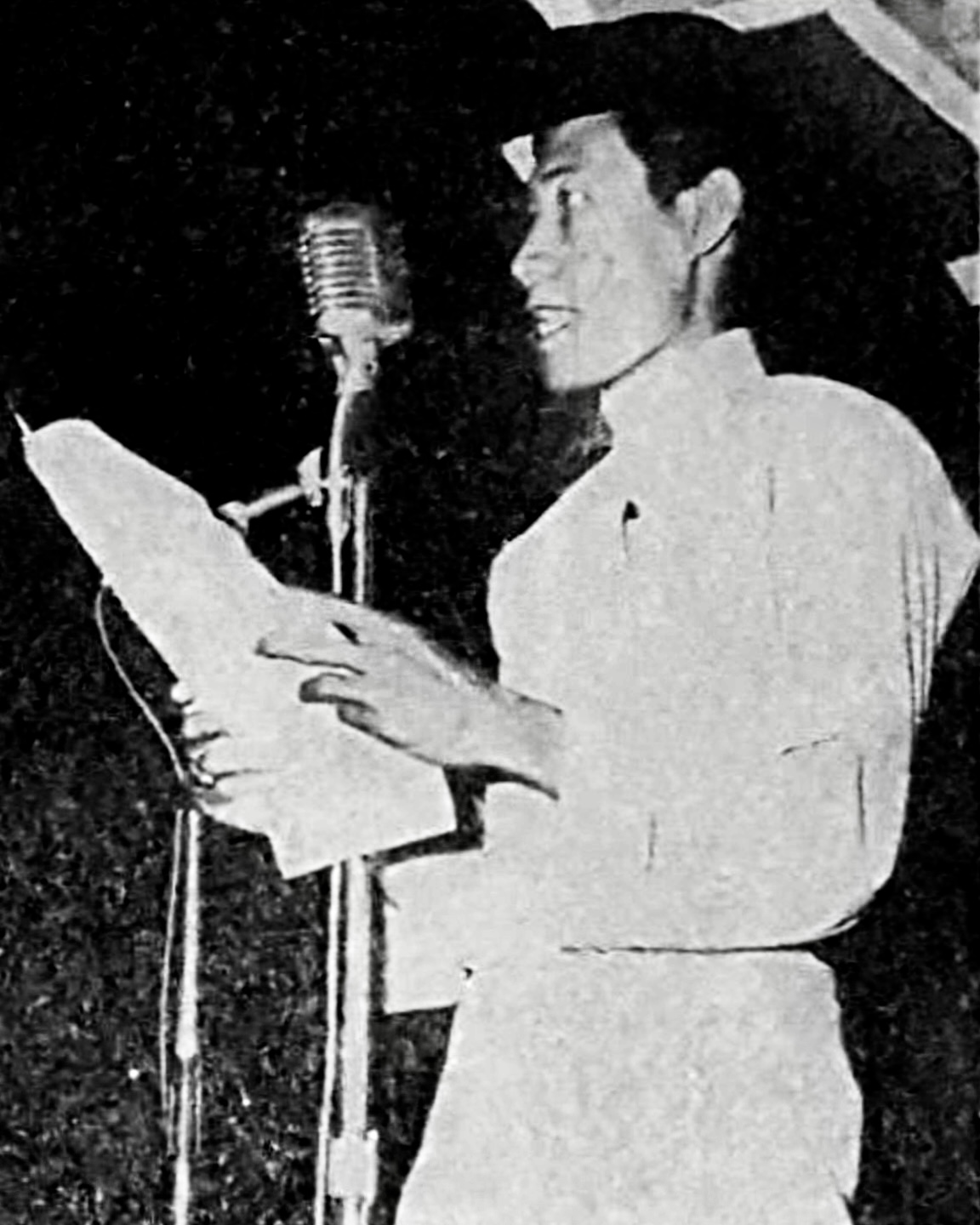
Abdul Aziz in 1971

Abdul Aziz held various roles early in his career with the Brunei government, including religious officer at the Department of Religious Affairs in 1970, head of broadcasting and information in 1971, and member of the Brunei Islamic Religious Council from 1971. He was appointed senior religious officer in 1976, a member of the Succession Council in 1978, and deputy chief kadi in 1983. Abdul Aziz became a member of the Privy Council on 17 April 1984, director of Syariah affairs in 1986, and deputy state mufti on 1 January 1989.

The appointment of Abdul Aziz Juned as state mufti on 1 September 1994 marked a significant turning point in Brunei's Islamic governance, coinciding with an intensified effort toward state-led Islamisation. Abdul Aziz, alongside Mahmud Saedon as special advisor in Syariah affairs, emerged as one of the most influential ulama in Brunei's modern history. As the nation's highest religious authority, his office holds the exclusive right to issue fatwas that are uniquely enforceable as law in Brunei. Succeeding former state mufti Ismail Omar Abdul Aziz, whose "strict" stance had steered Brunei toward a more orthodox Islamic approach, Abdul Aziz further deepened the state's Islamic discourse. His leadership aligned with Sultan Hassanal Bolkiah's assertion that no law or constitution could supersede the Quran. During this period, the groundwork for a comprehensive Islamic criminal law code was laid, with Abdul Aziz playing a central role in shaping Brunei's legal and religious framework.

As the head of the Brunei Islamic Religious Council's legal committee, Abdul Aziz Juned played a pivotal role in shaping the country's Syariah reforms. A key figure in Brunei's Islamic government, he promoted the SPCO 2013, highlighting in October 2013 that "Islam has its own human rights," which, he argued, are distinct from "man-made" rights. According to him, the latter are less universal and subject to change, whereas the rights guaranteed by Sharia law are timeless and unalterable. He stressed that genuine human rights are consistent with Syariah law, which presents them as enduring and fixed.

Abdul Aziz was instrumental in establishing the SPCO 2013 as a model for Southeast Asia, with the hope that it would inspire neighbouring nations. Under his leadership, Brunei also launched an ASEAN network for Syariah court cooperation in 2013, bringing together countries such as Indonesia, Malaysia, and Thailand. Brunei's commitment to ensuring the SPCO aligns with established Syariah law principles is further demonstrated by the consultations it held with Islamic organisations in Saudi Arabia, Pakistan, and Aceh. His contributions underscore his significant role in shaping Brunei's Syariah legal system and its influence in the region.

In 2013, Abdul Aziz advocated for the application of Syariah law as a deterrent to crime, particularly supporting severe penalties such as hand-chopping and stoning. He argued that the purpose of these laws was not to punish, but to prevent crimes from spreading through society. Despite widespread condemnation from the United Nations, human rights organisations, and prominent figures such as US President Joe Biden, George Clooney, and Elton John, Abdul Aziz maintained that those who viewed the sanctions as harsh had misinterpreted their intent. He highlighted that the aim was not to violate human rights but to discourage criminal behaviour.

On 4 January 2014, Abdul Aziz responded to critics of the SPCO, claiming that their comments were made without proper understanding of Islamic law. He dismissed the objections of online human rights organisations opposing the law's implementation as ignorant. He also addressed the issue of the headscarf in a speech in London, asserting that despite criticism, wearing the headscarf is a requirement in Islam, as prescribed by the Quran. Abdul Aziz praised Brunei’s decision to implement the alcohol ban, attributing blessings to the country. He concluded by urging students to prioritise regular prayers and Quranic study. In a talk at International Islamic University Malaysia on 20 August, Abdul Aziz highlighted that non-Muslims often praise aspects of Syariah law, particularly the interest-free Islamic banking system. He expressed disappointment at the confusion among Muslims, noting that ignorance of the law leads to division and weakens Iman. He stressed that the key to overcoming this "faith crisis" is spreading accurate knowledge through speeches, publications, and talks.

In 2015, amid global counter-terrorism efforts, Abdul Aziz condemned ISIS, stressing that Islam forbids bloodshed unless explicitly authorised by Syariah law. His firm stance reinforced Brunei's commitment to opposing extremist ideologies while upholding strict adherence to Islamic principles.

== Literacy career ==
=== Themes ===
Through his Islamic literary works, Abdul Aziz—known as Adi Rumi in the literary world—has made an impact on the development of language, literature, religion, culture, and his country. An advocate for the importance of literature and language, he has highlighted the need for "language heroes" to address the challenges facing the Malay language. His writings frequently explore spiritual and cultural themes, promoting Islamic values and beliefs through the medium of literature. Adi Rumi's works primarily engage with Syariah law, and the beauty of these legal systems, challenging misconceptions about their relevance and advocating for their application. Perintah Qanun Jenayah Syar'iah: Neraca Allah is a notable long poem that underscores the significance of Syariah law, emphasising justice and the all-encompassing nature of divine law.

=== Selected works ===
Abdul Aziz has authored several books, with some of his selected works including:

- Musuh Islam. Bandar Seri Begawan: Universiti Brunei Darussalam. 1986.
- Islam di Brunei [Islam in Brunei]. Bandar Seri Begawan: Pusat Sejarah Brunei. 1992.
- As Guest of Allah with Members of Brunei Royal Family: A Memoir. Bandar Seri Begawan: Brunei History Centre. 1999. ISBN 978-99917-34-02-6.
- Dari Jendela Dunia: Kumpulan Puisi. Bandar Seri Begawan: Dewan Bahasa dan Pustaka Brunei. 2008. ISBN 978-99917-0-607-8.
- Melayu Islam Beraja: "Mahkota Negara". Bandar Seri Begawan: Jabatan Mufti Kerajaan. 2011. ISBN 978-99917-33-96-8.
- Kerasukan: Merawat dan Mencegahnya. Bandar Seri Begawan: Jabatan Mufti Kerajaan. 2012. ISBN 978-99917-33-57-9.
- Qanun Jenayah Syariah: Satu Pengenalan (2nd ed.). Bandar Seri Begawan: Jabatan Mufti Kerajaan. 2014. ISBN 9789991760131.
- Berubat Dengan Perubatan Bumi dan Perubatan Langit. Bandar Seri Begawan: Jabatan Mufti Kerajaan. 2015. ISBN 978-99917-33-80-7.
- The King who Shapes History. Bandar Seri Begawan: State Mufti's Office. 2017. ISBN 978-99917-60-55-1.
- Raja Melakar Sejarah. Bandar Seri Begawan: Jabatan Mufti Kerajaan. 2017. ISBN 9789991760520.
- Di Mana Pun Adalah Bumi Allah. Bandar Seri Begawan: Dewan Bahasa dan Pustaka Brunei. 2020. ISBN 9789991769776.

== Personal life ==
Abdul Aziz is married to Datin Hajah Maznah binti Haji Mohammad, and they have three children—two sons and one daughter. Their daughter, Hanan, serves as the deputy dean of law and a lecturer at the Sultan Sharif Ali Islamic University. His home is located at Jalan Mulaut, Mukim Sengkurong.

== Titles, styles and honours ==
=== Titles and styles ===
On 26 March 1983, Abdul Aziz was honoured by Sultan Hassanal Bolkiah with the manteri title of Pehin Udana Khatib. He was later elevated to the title of Pehin Tuan Imam on 6 November 1984, and eventually to Pehin Datu Seri Maharaja on 9 May 1996. The latter title carries the style Yang Dimuliakan Lagi Dihormati.

=== Awards ===
Abdul Aziz has been given the following awards:

- ASEAN Cultural Award for Literary Works (1993)
- SEA Write Award (2000)
- Anugerah Khas Penulisan Islam Yayasan Sultan Haji Hassanal Bolkiah (27 June 2011)
- Anugerah Tokoh Ugama bagi Tahun 1433 Hijrah (26 November 2011)
- Anugerah Kesusasteraan Islam Yayasan Sultan Haji Hassanal Bolkiah Ke-2 (25 November 2013)
- Anugerah Perdana Penerbit Nusantara from the Yayasan Pembangunan Buku Negara (10 December 2014)
- Buku Terlaris 2014 (Kategori Ilmiah) at the Brunei Book Festival and Reading Culture Empowerment Carnival (2015)

=== Honours ===
Abdul Aziz has been bestowed the following honours:

- Order of Islam Brunei First Class (PSSUB; 1984) – Dato Paduka Seri Setia
- Order of Islam Brunei Third Class (SSUB; 1982)
- Order of Paduka Seri Laila Jasa Second Class (DSLJ; 1983) – Dato Seri Laila Jasa
- Sultan Hassanal Bolkiah Medal First Class (PHBS; 15 July 2010)
- Pingat Bakti Laila Ikhlas (PBLI; 1982)
- Long Service Medal (PKL)
- Honorary Doctorate in Literature from Universiti Brunei Darussalam (11 September 2007)

Political offices
Preceded by Ismail Omar Abdul Aziz	2nd State Mufti of Brunei; 1 September 1994 – present	Succeeded by Incumbent
