= Luqman Abdullah =

Malaysian mufti

Sahibus Samahah Datuk Dr. Luqman Abdullah PMW JMK
- لقمان عبدالله

8th Mufti of the Federal Territories
- In office 15 May 2020 – 23 May 2025
- Deputy: Jamali Mohd Adnan
- Monarch: Abdullah
- Prime Minister: Muhyiddin Yassin; Ismail Sabri Yaakob; Anwar Ibrahim
- Preceded by: Zulkifli Mohamad Al-Bakri
- Succeeded by: Fauwaz Fadzil

Personal details
- Born: Luqman bin Abdullah; 12 September 1969 (age 57) Pasir Mas, Kelantan, Malaysia
- Spouse: Wan Marhaini Wan Ahmad
- Education: University of Malaya (BA); University of Edinburgh (PhD)
- Occupation: Lecturer and preacher
- Website: Luqman Abdullah on UMExpert

Luqman bin Abdullah (Jawi: لقمان عبدالله, Malay pronunciation: [luqman]; born 12 September 1969) is a Malaysian Islamic scholar, preacher and university lecturer who was the 8th Mufti of the Federal Territories of Malaysia. He replaced Datuk Dr. Zulkifli Mohamad Al-Bakri who was appointed as a Senator to hold the Minister in the Prime Minister's Department portfolio in charge of Religious Affairs. He is also a Member of the Shariah Advisory Committee for MBSB Bank and Takaful Malaysia and is an associate professor at the Department of Fiqh and Usul Fiqh, University of Malaya Academy of Islamic Studies.

== Early life and education ==
Luqman was born on 12 September 1969 in Kampung Pondok Lubok Tapah, Pasir Mas, Kelantan. He is the second son of a prominent Kelantanese islamic scholar, Tuan Guru Haji Abdullah. He received his formal education at Sekolah Kebangsaan Lemal, Pasir Mas in 1976 to 1980, and his secondary studies at Sekolah Menengah Ugama (Arabiah) Pasir Mas from 1981 to 1986. He then continued his foundation studies at the Islamic Studies Academy of University of Malaya at Nilam Puri from 1987 to 1989 before continuing his undergraduate studies at the Faculty of Syariah, Academy of Islamic Studies at the University of Malaya in 1989 to 1993. During his doctorate studies, he went to the University of Edinburgh, Scotland until 2005 majoring in the field of Islamic property law.

== Bibliography ==
Apart from lecturing, Luqman has also published a number of books specifically focusing on Islamic finance and law.

=== Books and articles ===
- (2022) Development of Zakat in Malaysia: Past and Present, Kuala Lumpur: Universiti Malaya Press.
- (2019) Menekuni Strategi Dakwah Dalam Masyarakat Majmuk. Shah Alam: Persatuan Ulama Malaysia.
- (2019) Kutipan Zakat Rentas Sempadan: Teori Fiqh dan Realiti di Malaysia - Siri Kajian AZKA 1/2019. Kuala Lumpur: PPZ-MAIWP.
- (2016) Konflik Fatwa di Malaysia, Kuala Lumpur: Jabatan Fiqh dan Usul, APIUM.
- (2016) Maqasid al-Shariah:Aplikasi Dalam Aspek Muamalat Dan Kehartaan, Kuala Lumpur: Jabatan Fiqh Dan Usul, Universiti Malaya.
- (2016) Menelusuri Isu-isu Kontemporari Zakat, Kuala Lumpur: PPZ.

== Honours ==
=== Honours of Malaysia ===
- Federal Territory (Malaysia)
  - Commander of the Order of the Territorial Crown (PMW) – Datuk (2021)
- Kelantan
  - Companion of the Order of the Life of the Crown of Kelantan (JMK) (2016)
