= Ibrahim Ibn Saleh al-Hussaini =

Nigerian Islamic scholar

Ibrahim Saleh al-Hussaini Sheikh (Dr) CON
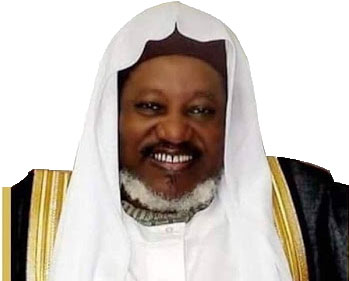
- Sharif Saleh at Abuja Nigeria in 2020

Personal life
- Born: Ibrahim Saleh al-Hussaini; 1938 (age 87–88) Borno State, Nigeria
- Occupation: Mufti

Religious life
- Religion: Islam
- Denomination: Sunni
- Jurisprudence: Maliki
- Movement: Sufi

Ibrahim Ibn Saleh al-Hussaini CON, also known as Shaykh Sharif Saleh (born 12 May 1938), is a Nigerian Islamic scholar, teacher and mufassir. He is the grand Mufti of the Federal Republic of Nigeria he established annahda college of science and Islamic studies in the year 1957 and he is currently the head of the Supreme Council for Fatwa and Islamic Affairs in Nigeria (NSCIA).

== Early life ==
Al-Hussaini was born on May 12, 1938, at a town called al-Fadhaa near Dikwa in Borno State, Nigeria. His father Shaykh Saleh was a religious scholar.

== Education ==
Al-Hussaini started his early childhood education at his father's madrasa one of the popular Islamic schools in Borno at that time, later he went to Saudi Arabia, Egypt and Pakistan to further his Islamic studies with interest in Hadith and Quranic sciences. Some of his teachers include; Shaykh Al-Qadi Abani Borno, Abubakar al-Waziri Borno, Shaykh Adam al-Mahrusa Borno, Ahmad AbdulFathi, Shaykh Tijjani Usman (Zangon Bare-bari), Shaykh Abubakar Atik, Muhammad al-Arabi bin Kubbani, Abubakar al-Kashnawiy, Muhammad al-Hafiz, Mahmoud Khalil Al-Hussary, Ahmad Nur al-Barni, Muhammad Hassanil Makhluf, Muhammad Zakariya al-Kandahlawiy, Ibrahim Nyass among others. Al-Hussaini has also studied English language in London.

== Career ==
Al-Hussaini is an international Islamic figure. Currently, he is the head of the Supreme Council for Fatwa and Islamic Affairs in Nigeria and he is a member of the Muslim Council of Elders. He completed his studies at the Supreme Islamic Institute in his country Nigeria and then studied at the hands of well-known scholars in many countries. Al-Hussaini delivered many lectures in the fields of Al-Tafsir Qur’an and the Hadith as well as Islamic sciences, jurisprudence and ethics.

=== Positions ===
He has held and still holds several significant positions, some of which are:

- Chairman of Financial Regulation Advisory Council of Experts (FRACE) Central Bank of Nigeria
- Founder and mentor of the Islamic Renaissance Organization
- Founding Member Association of Muslim Scholars in Africa (Morocco)
- Adviser to the Federal Government on Islamic Affairs 1992
- Assistant Secretary-General for African Affairs in the World Islamic People's Leadership 1989
- Chairman of Assembly of Muslims in Nigeria (AMIN)
- Member of the Muslim Council of Elders.
- Founder of Sheikh Shariff Ibrahim Saleh Islamic Center (SHISIC)

== Publications ==
Shaykh Ibn Saleh has written more than six hundred (600) books and pamphlets, as well as more than two hundred (200) commissioned conference papers, all in the Arabic language which include: Qur’anic sciences, Prophetic Traditions, History, Philosophy, Islamic studies etc.

== Medals and awards ==
Shaykh has received a number of awards and certificates of appreciation on various occasions, including the following:

- The Egyptian First Class Award in Arts and Sciences (Wisam Al-Jamhuriya), presented by the Egyptian President, His Excellency, Mr. Muhammad Hosni Mubarak, Arab Republic of Egypt, 1993.
- Certificate of Merit and Award of Honour on Islamic Da’wah, presented by Abi Alnnour Islamic Foundation and the Supreme Council for Islamic Affairs, Syria, 1997.
- First Class Award of Pioneering in the Service of the Ummah (Wisam Elriyada), presented by the Leader of the Libyan Revolution, Colonel Mu’ammar Gaddafi, Libya, 1998.
- The Award for Islamic Preaching (Dir’a-Daawah), presented by the World Islamic Call Society, Libya, 1998.
- Al-Imam Abu Ala’za’im Medal of Islamic Call (Imam Gold Medal), Cairo, 1988.
- First Class Merit Award on Writing (Afro-Asian Writer of the Year 2004), presented by the Afro-Asian Association of Egypt, Cairo, 2004.
- National Merit Award of Commander of the Order of the Niger (CON), presented by His Excellency, Al-Haji Umaru Musa Yar’Adua, President and Commander-in-Chief of the Armed Forces, Federal Republic of Nigeria, Abuja, 2008.
- The Award of Doctorate Degree of Science (Honoris Causa), Conferred at the 3rd Convocation Ceremony of the Nigerian-Turkish Nile University, Abuja, 2015.
- The First International Royal Award in Islamic Thought and Research, presented by His Majesty, King Muhammad VI, King of the Kingdom of Morocco, 2017.

== Legacies ==
- There is a Mosque named after him; Shaykh Ibrahim Ibn Saleh Mosque Niger.
