= Ismail Omar Abdul Aziz =

Malaysian muslim scholar (1911–1994)

Yang Dimuliakan Lagi Dihormati Pehin Datu Seri Maharaja Dato Seri Utama Ismail Omar Abdul Aziz DK PSSUB DSLJ SMB PHBS PIS
- اسماعيل عمر عبدالعزيز
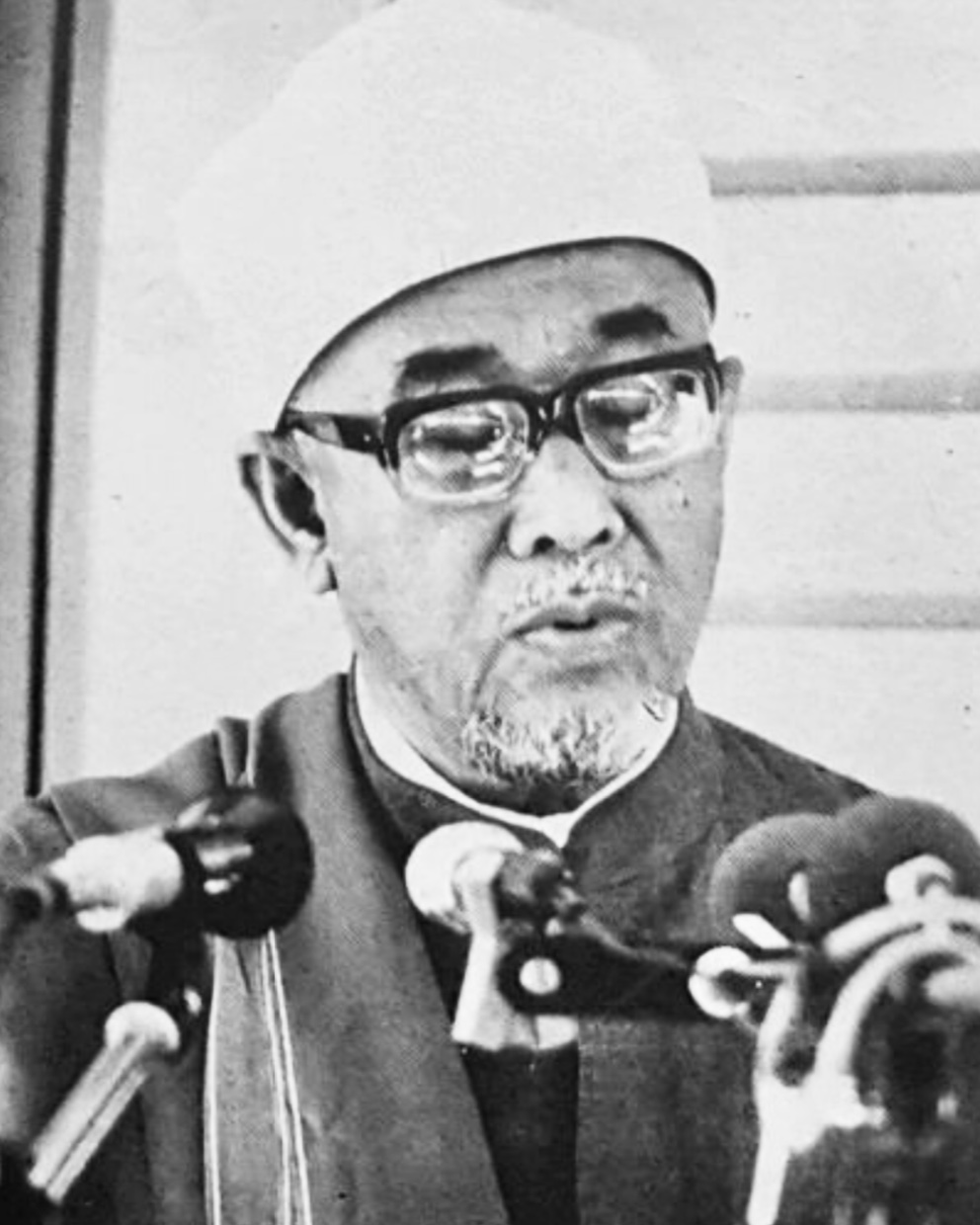
- Ismail in the 1960s

1st State Mufti of Brunei
- In office 8 March 1967 – 3 February 1994
- Monarchs: Omar Ali Saifuddien III; Hassanal Bolkiah
- Deputy: Abdul Aziz Juned
- Preceded by: Himself (1965)
- Succeeded by: Abdul Aziz Juned
- In office 1 April 1962 – 31 March 1965
- Monarch: Omar Ali Saifuddien III
- Preceded by: Office established
- Succeeded by: Himself (1967)

Personal details
- Born: 1911 Kampong Rengit, Johor, Federated Malay States (present-day Malaysia)
- Died: 3 February 1994 (aged 82) Raja Isteri Pengiran Anak Saleha Hospital, Bandar Seri Begawan, Brunei
- Resting place: Royal Mausoleum, Bandar Seri Begawan, Brunei
- Spouse: Kamaliah Suhaimi
- Education: University of Al-Azhar; University of Cairo

Ismail bin Omar Abdul Aziz (Note: The earlier spelling of his patronymic was written as "Umar Abdul Aziz" instead of "Omar Abdul Aziz".) (1911 – 3 February 1994) was a Malaysian aristocrat and Muslim scholar who served as the first State Mufti of Brunei from 1962 to 1965 and again from 1967 until his death in 1994. He is renowned for his profound contributions to Islamic scholarship, his instrumental role in shaping Brunei's religious landscape as its inaugural mufti, and his insightful fatwas that not only provided clarity on religious matters but also addressed broader ethical, social, and health concerns. His leadership and work strengthened the ties between Brunei and Johor, solidifying his legacy as a respected figure in both regions.

== Early life and education ==
Ismail bin Omar Abdul Aziz was born in 1911 in Kampong Rengit, Batu Pahat, Johor. He received his early education at Malay School and the Johor Government Quran School from 1919 to 1923, before continuing his studies at Al-Attas Arabic School, Johor Bahru, from 1923 to 1928. Upon completing his studies at Al-Attas Arabic School, he was appointed in 1929 to teach at the same school and at Al-Attas College, Johor Bahru, where he served until 1937. In 1938, he was awarded a scholarship by the Johor government to further his studies at Al-Azhar University and Cairo University in Egypt, where he remained until 1948 and successfully obtained no fewer than five advanced degrees from five different faculties at these universities.

== Career ==
After returning from Egypt in 1949, Ismail was appointed as an Arabic school inspector and editor of Warta, a publication under the Johor Religious Affairs Department, serving in this role until 1952. He was then promoted to the position of district kadhi in Segamat, Johor, from 1953 to 1954. In 1955, he was seconded to become the principal of the newly established Kolej Islam Malaya, located in a waqf palace of Sultan Hisamuddin Alam Shah in Selangor. During this time, he and Haji Othman bin Haji Mohammad, who later became the director of government religious schools in Brunei, were invited to Brunei. At the request of Sultan Omar Ali Saifuddien III, they assessed the possibility of establishing a government religious school system in the country. This visit led to the founding of Brunei's first structured religious school in September 1956.

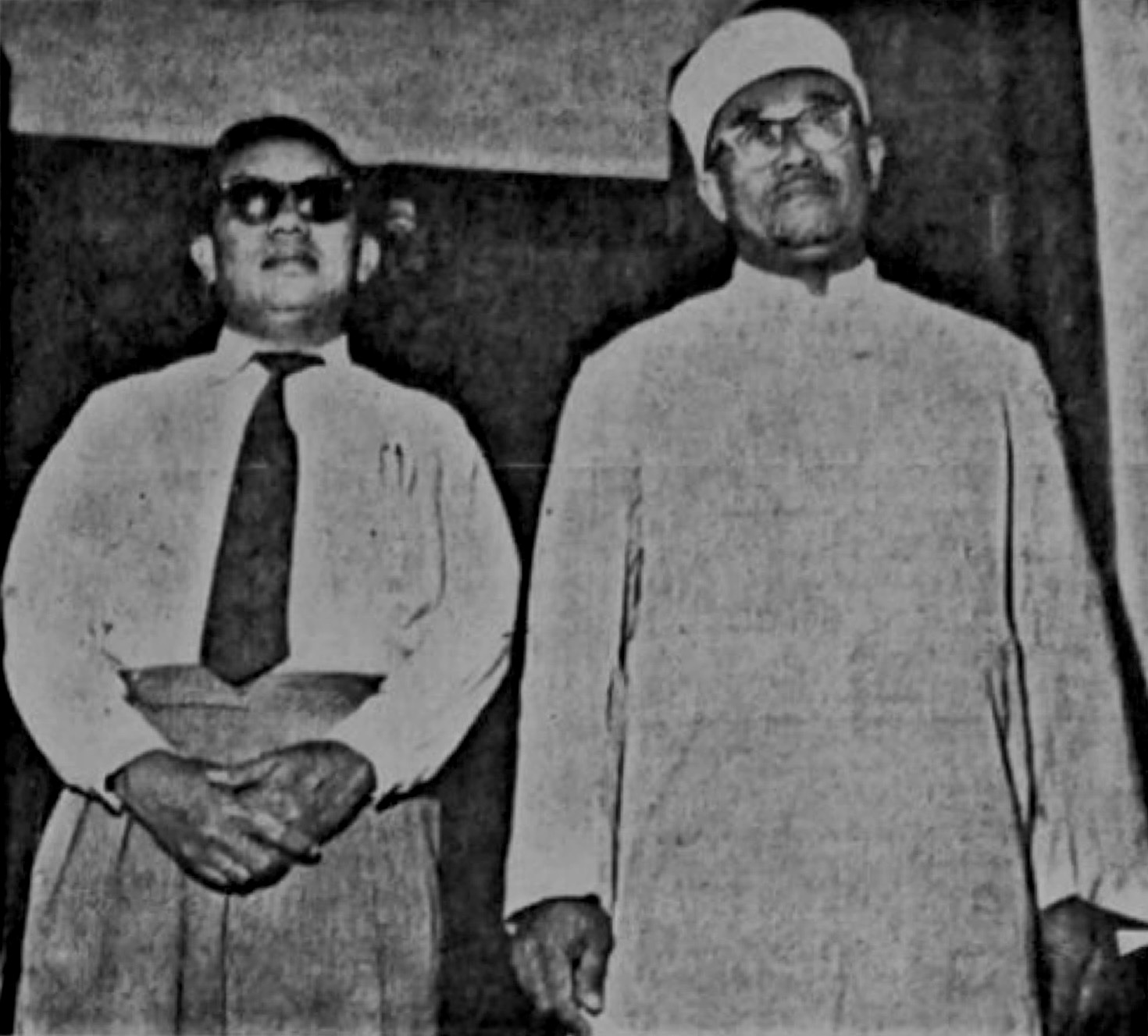
Pengiran Anak Kemaluddin (left) and Ismail (right) in April 1962

In 1956, Ismail returned to Johor after being appointed acting deputy mufti of Johor. He then became the district kadhi of Pontian, Johor in 1957, acting chief kadhi of Johor in 1958, and was later confirmed as the chief kadhi of Johor, holding the position until 1961. On 1 April 1962, the Johor government seconded him to serve as the mufti of Brunei for three years. This appointment was made following an agreement between Sultan Omar Ali and Sultan Ismail of Johor. The creation of the mufti role was not only in accordance with the Religious Council and Kadhi Courts Law No. 20/1955 but was also strongly endorsed by Sultan Omar Ali. In a letter to the Menteri Besar of Brunei on 24 January 1961, the sultan emphasised the importance of having a scholar who could provide fatwas and interpret religious laws for the welfare of the people, acknowledging the difficulty of addressing Islamic issues without such expertise in a country that officially upholds Islam.

Ismail completed his contract with the Brunei government on 31 March 1965 and then returned to serve with the Johor government as deputy mufti until his retirement on 1 January 1967. On 8 March 1967, he resumed his service with the Brunei government as mufti. His appointment was approved by the sultan, effective from 11 March 1967, in accordance with Chapter 40(1) of the Religious Council and Kadhi Courts Law of 1955. During his final tenure as state mufti, he was included and appointed into various national and institutional councils such as the Succession Council, Brunei Islamic Religious Council, Judicial Committee, and many others up to an estimated 40. Additionally, he has represented Brunei in many international and regional seminars and congresses.

Ismail gained notoriety on 3 November 1984, when he claimed that three foreign organisations with Bruneian organisation—the Lions Club, Rotary Club, and a Masonic lodge—were anti-Islamic and supporting Zionist activities. Although the mufti's editorials in the Pelita Brunei were his personal opinions and not a ruling, a top government official stated that Muslims would still be expected to follow his counsel.

Ismail had declared many fatwas during those years, one of which was the banning of selling alcoholic drinks. He was an excellent figure who has the ability and can be identified through various aspects, such as personality, trustworthy nature, extensive knowledge, steadfast and courageous attitude, and fiery spirit. His Fatwas were seen as firm, insightful, and enlightening. According to entries in the register of fatwas kept by the State Mufti's Office, up to 1,753 series of fatwas were published between 1962 and the end of his life in 1993.

== Death ==
Ismail died on 3 February 1993, at the age of 82, in the Raja Isteri Pengiran Anak Saleha Hospital in Bandar Seri Begawan. In recognition of his significant contributions, he was honoured with a royal funeral, and his remains were laid to rest in the Royal Mausoleum in Batu Satu.

== Legacy ==
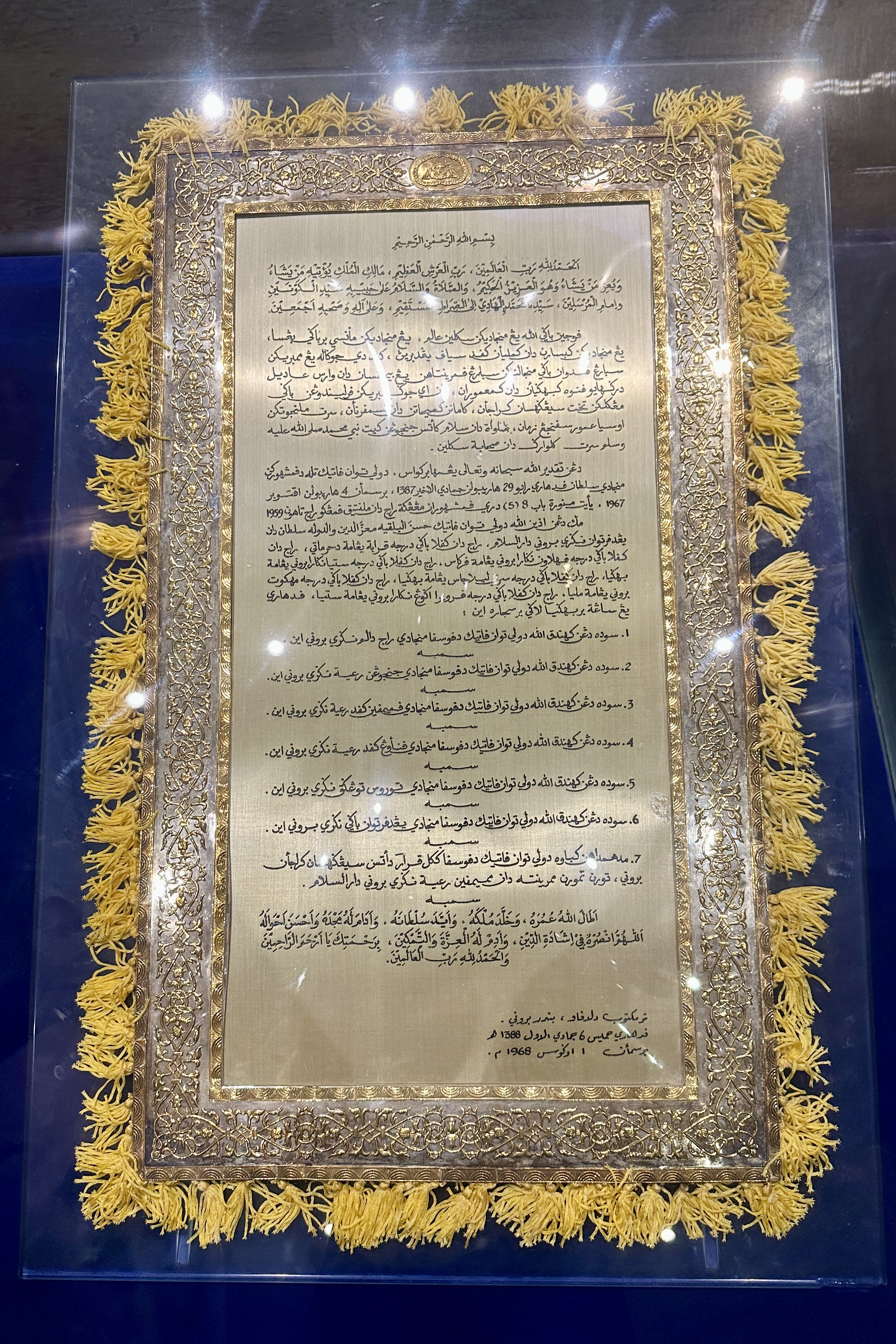
The coronation doa for Sultan Hassanal Bolkiah, read by Ismail on 1 August 1968

Ismail's significant contributions to Islamic scholarship and his essential role in shaping Brunei's religious and social framework established him as a respected figure in both Brunei and Johor. Known for his steadfast dedication to Islamic principles, especially in his fatwas, he had a direct influence on key policies, including Brunei's alcohol ban. As the first mufti of Brunei, his leadership was defined by his ability to deliver clear, resolute religious rulings, earning him widespread admiration and acknowledgment. His efforts also played a crucial role in strengthening the relationship between Brunei and Johor, further solidifying his legacy as a leader who valued both faith and diplomacy.

Ismail's fatwas were highly regarded for their depth and thoroughness, extending well beyond simple clarifications of what is halal or haram. His rulings were comprehensive, offering not only religious guidance but also valuable perspectives on the ethical, social, and health-related aspects of his decisions. For example, when discussing halal food, he not only addressed prohibitions but also emphasised the positive impact of lawful food on one’s character, health, and prayers. His approach, combining intellectual insight with compassionate wisdom, earned him great respect. His legacy is a testament to his unwavering commitment to Islamic law and the spiritual welfare of his community, showing that religious observance is integral to both moral and spiritual well-being.

Ismail played a key role in maintaining the nation's traditional and moderate Islamic philosophy, averting theological disputes such to those between the reformist Kaum Muda and the traditionalist Kaum Tua that are common in the Malay Muslim community. Rejecting the impact of reformist thinkers like Rashid Rida and Ibn Taymiyya, whom he claimed lacked validity since they lacked recognised religious mentorship, he placed a strong focus on adhering to Islamic principles as understood and performed by competent religious teachers. Ismail's adamant opposition to Wahhabism and religious innovations (bid'ah) demonstrated his dedication to upholding Brunei's long-standing religious customs and steering clear of polarising ideological tendencies.

== Personal life ==
Ismail was married to Datin Seri Setia Hajah Kamaliah Suhaimi bte Hj Muhd Fadzlullah Suhaimi, who died in 2008. Together, they had a daughter, Hajah Nurol Huda, who is a lecturer at the Faculty of Syariah and Law at Sultan Sharif Ali Islamic University. His family resides in Jalan Tutong.

== Titles, styles and honours ==
=== Titles and styles ===
On 1 February 1968, Ismail was honoured by Sultan Hassanal Bolkiah with the manteri title of Pehin Datu Seri Maharaja, bearing the style Yang Dimuliakan Lagi Dihormati.

=== Honours ===
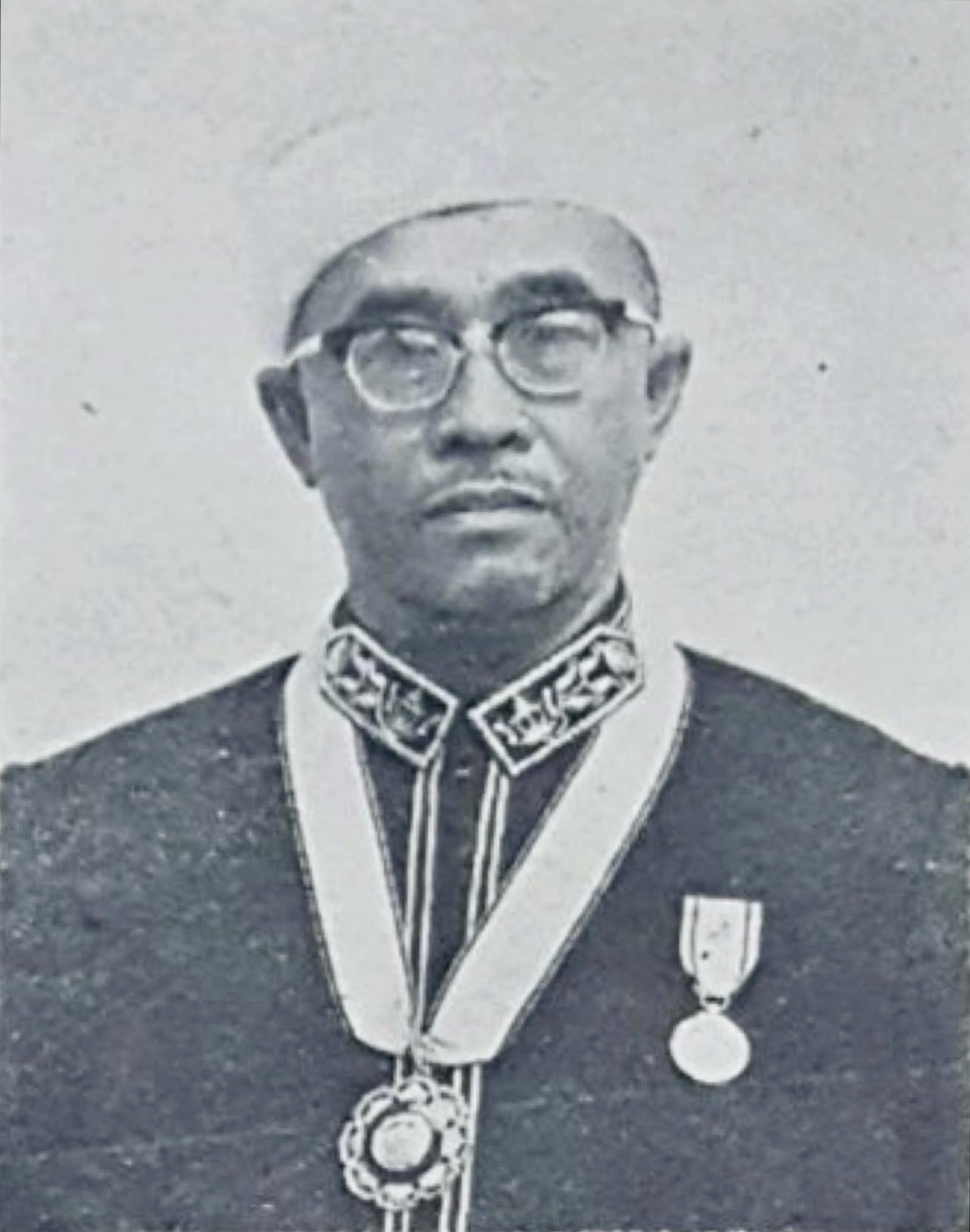
Ismail wearing his SMB, c. 1967

Ismail has been bestowed the following honours:

- Family Order of Seri Utama (DK) – Dato Seri Utama
- Order of Islam Brunei First Class (PSSUB) – Dato Paduka Seri Setia
- Order of Paduka Seri Laila Jasa Second Class (DSLJ) – Dato Seri Laila Jasa
- Order of Seri Paduka Mahkota Brunei Third Class (SMB)
- Sultan Hassanal Bolkiah Medal (PHBS)
- Sultan Ibrahim Medal First Class (PIS)
- Universiti Brunei Darussalam Doctor in Laws (25 September 1991)

== Notes ==
Political offices
Preceded by Office established Office abolished	1st State Mufti of Brunei; 1 April 1962 – 31 March 1965; 8 March 1967 – 3 February 1994	Succeeded by Office reinstated Abdul Aziz Juned
