= Abdul Latif Derian =

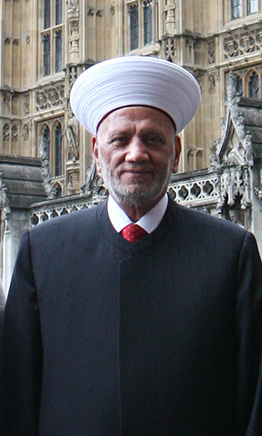
- Grand Mufti of Lebanon at the Houses of Parliament in London, 25 March 2015.

Grand Mufti of Lebanon
- Incumbent
- Assumed office August 2014

Personal details
- Born: April 3, 1953 (age 72) Beirut, Lebanon

Sheikh Abdul Latif Derian (Arabic: عبد اللطيف فايز دريان) is the Grand Mufti of Lebanon since August 2014. As the spiritual leader of Lebanese Muslims, the Grand Mufti holds the highest religious post for a Sunni Islamic scholar in Lebanon. The honorific his eminence is used in referring to him.
