= State Mufti of Brunei =

Highest Islamic religious official in the country

State Mufti Office
- Jabatan Mufti Kerajaan جابتن مفتي كراجأن
- National emblem of Brunei

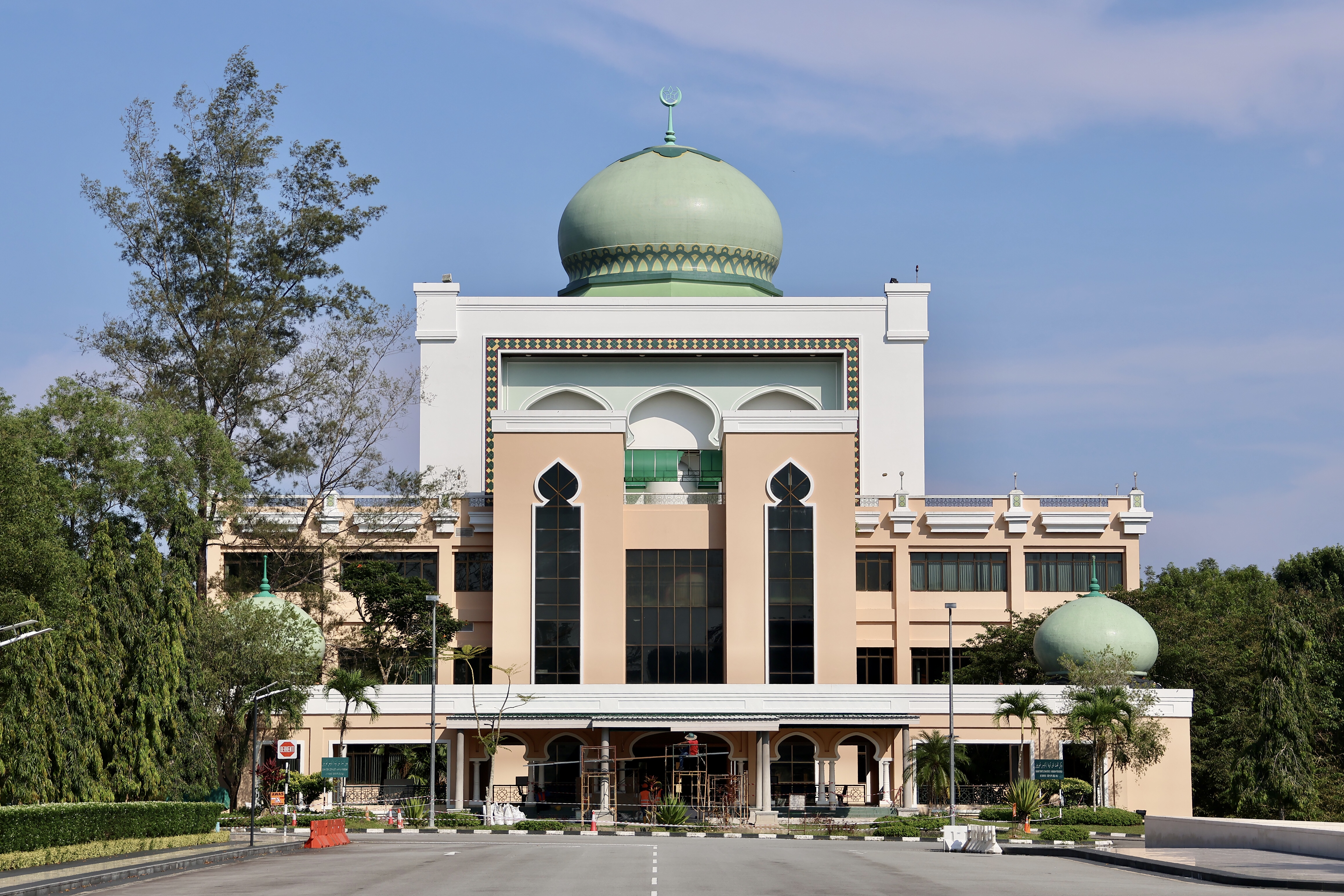
- State Mufti Office in Bandar Seri Begawan, Brunei

Agency overview
- Formed: 1 September 1994; 31 years ago
- Jurisdiction: Government of Brunei
- Headquarters: 26, Jalan Pengiran Babu Raja, Bandar Seri Begawan, Brunei BA2112
- Employees: c. 1,000
- Annual budget: B$260 million
- Agency executives: Abdul Aziz Juned, State Mufti; Japar Mat Dain, Deputy State Mufti
- Parent agency: Prime Minister's Office
- Child agency: Ministry of Religious Affairs of Brunei
- Website: www.pmo.gov.bn www.mufti.gov.bn

The State Mufti (Malay: Mufti Kerajaan) holds the highest authority in Brunei's religious governance. Unlike in many other countries, this position possesses the exclusive power to issue fatwas, or Islamic legal rulings, which carry enforceable authority within the nation.

== Role ==
The State Mufti is the most senior religious authority in the country. His main role is to give opinions (fatwas) on legal matters and on social affairs base on Islamic Koran, Hadeeth, Qiyas and Ijma' of Ulema.

== History ==
The first State Mufti of Brunei was Ismail Omar Abdul Aziz from 1962 to 1965. He had been Mufti of Johore in Malaysia. In 1967, Ismail again became Brunei's State Mufti until his death. In 1994, Brunei-born Vice State Mufti Abdul Aziz Juned became the country's State Mufti.

== List of state muftis ==
=== State Mufti ===
Portrait	Minister	Term start	Term end	Time in office	Ref.
	Ismail Omar Abdul Aziz	1 April 1962	31 March 1965	2 years, 364 days	
	Ismail Omar Abdul Aziz	8 March 1967	3 February 1994	26 years, 332 days	
	Abdul Aziz Juned	1 September 1994	Incumbent	31 years, 361 days	

=== Deputy State Mufti ===
Portrait	Minister	Term start	Term end	Time in office	Ref.
	Suhaili Mohiddin	1 September 1994	31 August 2015	20 years, 364 days	
	Dr Hj Japar Hj Mat Dain	1 September 2015	Incumbent	10 years, 361 days	
