= Saliou Coumbassa =

Guinean politician (1932–2003)

Saliou Coumbassa (2 February 1932, in Baralandé – 30 September 2003) was a Guinean politician and educator.

He was admitted to Van Wollenhoven school in Dakar in 1949, where he obtained two bachelor's degrees, before entering the École normale supérieure William Ponty in Senegal, where he became a teacher certified in elementary education. After military service, he returned to Guinea in 1957 and first taught at Kindia Wassou application school, where he was a colleague of poet and writer David Diop. In Kindia, he further taught at the Friguiagbé elementary school, where for a time he was the director.

In 1960 he received a scholarship to study at the Faculty of Humanities of Bordeaux in France and obtained a degree. He then returned to Guinea in 1963, and resumed a teacher, teaching French. In 1964, he was appointed headmaster of Donka grammar school, and the following year he became inspector of schools in Kankan, the capital of Upper Guinea region, then Labé in Middle Guinea. In 1969 he was appointed inspector general of education at the Ministry of Education, and the following year President Ahmed Sékou Touré appointed him Secretary of State for Justice, a position where he succeeded Mohamed Kassory Bangoura. He was arrested in 1971, and spent nine years, six months and seventeen days in Camp Boiro.

Released from prison in 1981, he stayed away from public life until 1984, after the death Touré and the assumption of power by the military. In June 1984, he was one of the initiators of the project to overhaul and redevelopment of the Guinean education system. He was then UN Ambassador to Guinea from 1985 to 1987, and on 22 December 1985 the President of the Republic, General Lansana Conte, appointed him national education minister. In a cabinet reshuffle in February 1990, he became Minister of Social Affairs and Employment, until February 1991.
