= El Hadj Mamadou Saliou Camara =

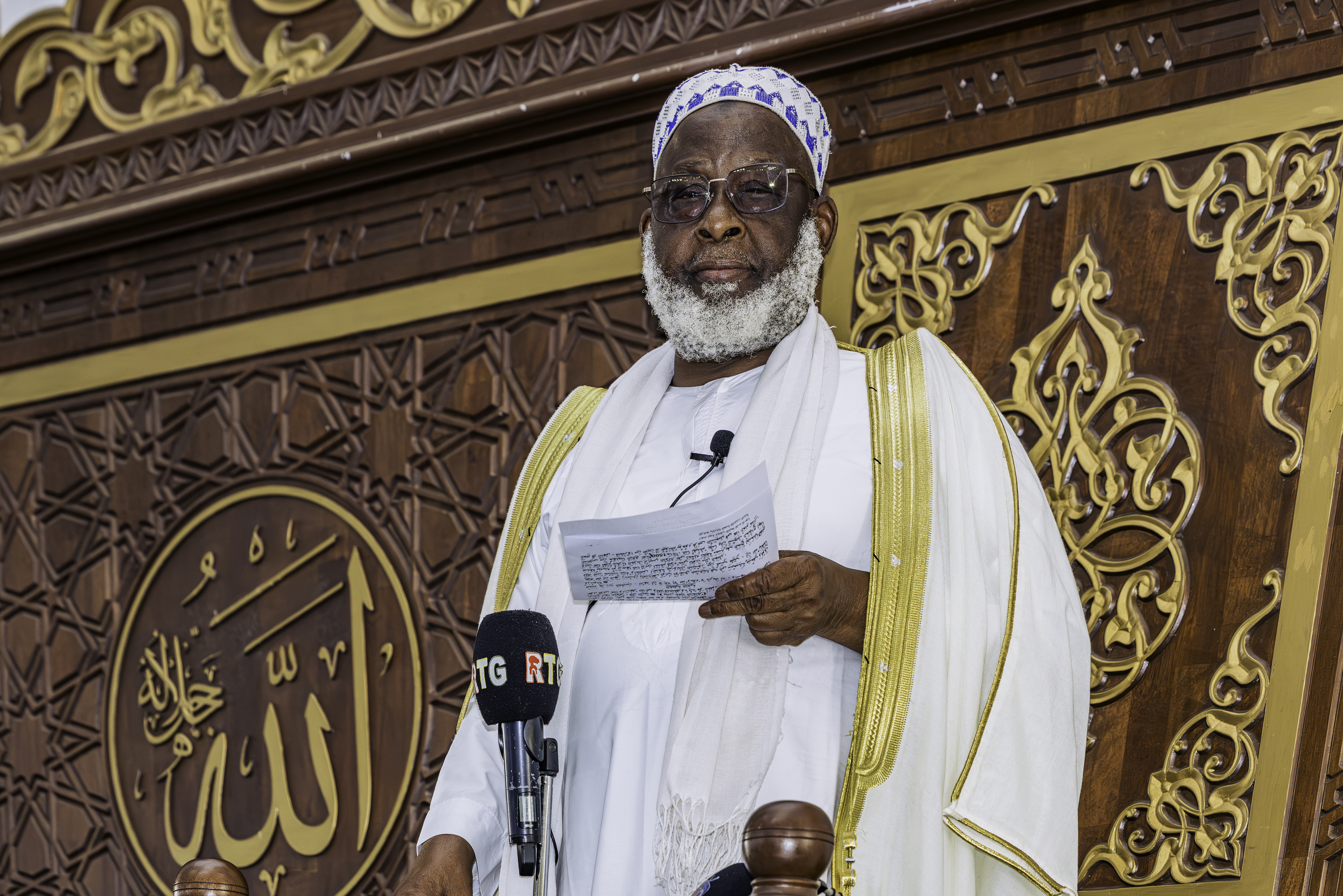

El Hadj Mamadou Saliou Camara is the grand imam of Guinea, and the country's highest cleric.

On 27 January 2015, he said, in relation to the Ebola virus epidemic in West Africa, "There is nothing in the Koran that says you must wash, kiss or hold your dead loved ones," and he called on citizens to do more to stop the virus by practicing safer burying rituals that do not compromise tradition.
