= Tawfiq Canaan =

Palestinian physician and author (1882–1964)

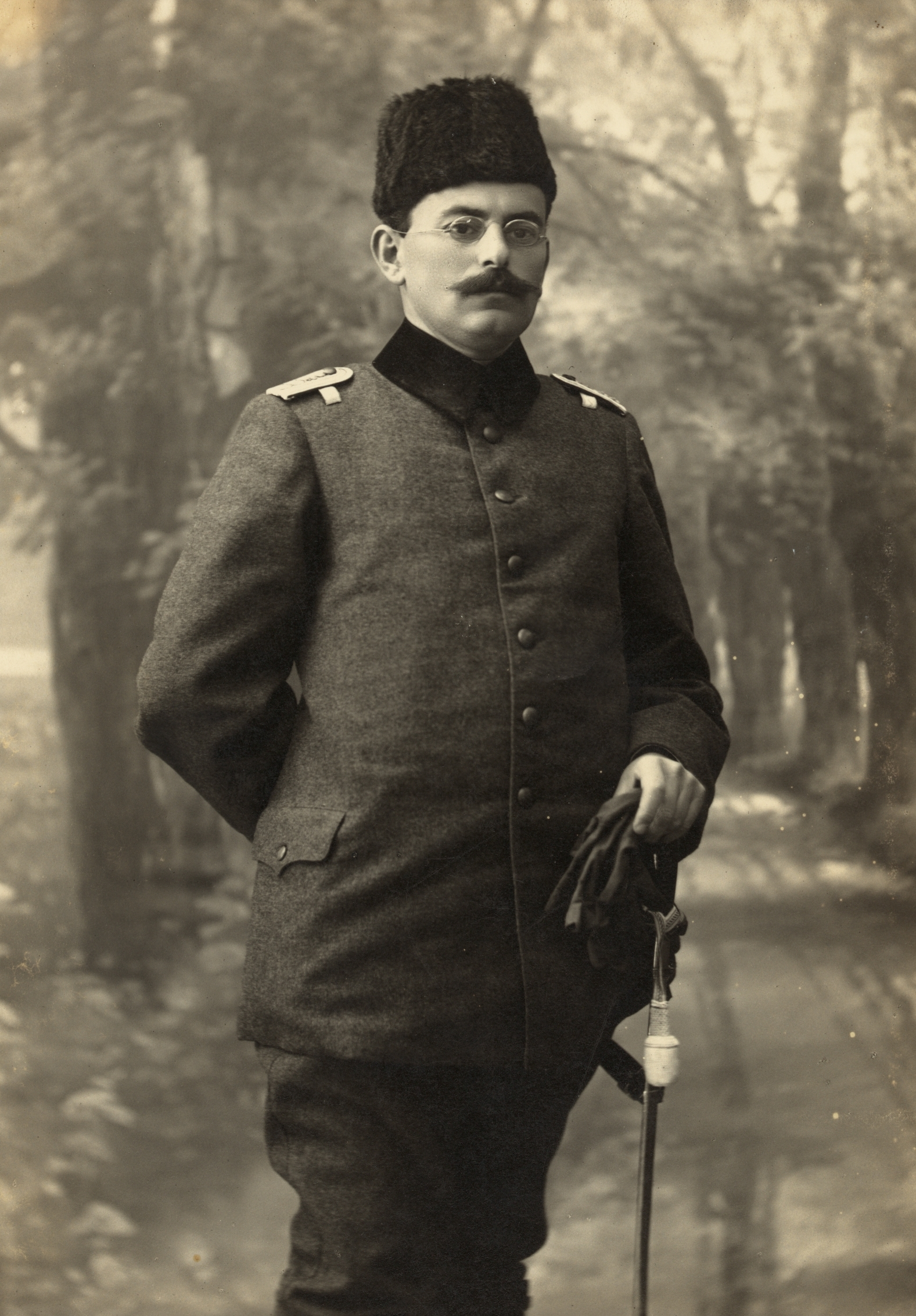
- Born: 24 September 1882; Beit Jala, Ottoman Empire
- Died: 15 January 1964 (aged 81); East Jerusalem, West Bank
- Occupations: Physician, ethnographer, author
- Known for: Pioneer in the field of medicine in Palestine; Researcher of Palestinian popular heritage
- Parent(s): Bechara Canaan and Katharina Khairallah

Tawfiq Canaan (Arabic: توفيق كنعان; 24 September 1882 – 15 January 1964) was a Palestinian physician, medical researcher, ethnographer, and Palestinian nationalist. Born in Beit Jala during the rule of the Ottoman Empire, he served as a medical officer in the Ottoman army during World War I.

During British rule, he served as the first President of the Palestine Arab Medical Association founded in 1944, and as the director of several Jerusalem area hospitals before, during, and after the 1948 war. Over the course of his medical career, he authored more than thirty-seven studies on topics including tropical medicine, bacteriology, malaria, tuberculosis, and health conditions in Palestine, and contributed to research that led to a cure for leprosy.

Interested in Palestinian folklore, popular beliefs, and superstitions, Canaan collected over 1,400 amulets and talismanic objects believed to have healing and protective properties. His published analyses of these objects, and other popular folk traditions and practices, brought him recognition as an ethnographer and anthropologist. The several books and more than 50 articles he wrote in English and German serve as valuable resources to researchers of Palestinian and Arab heritage. Canaan also published works in Arabic and was fluent in Hebrew.

An outspoken public figure, he also wrote two books on the Palestine problem, reflecting his involvement in confronting British imperialism and Zionism. He was arrested by the British authorities in 1939. The last two decades of his life were lived in the shadow of several personal tragedies: the loss of his son in an accident at Jerash, the loss and destruction of his family home, and of his clinic in Jerusalem during the 1948 war.

Canaan managed to re-establish his life and career in East Jerusalem under Jordanian rule. First taking sanctuary in a convent in the Old City for two years, he was appointed director of the Augusta Victoria Hospital on the Mount of Olives, where he lived with his family through his retirement until his death in 1964.

== Early life ==
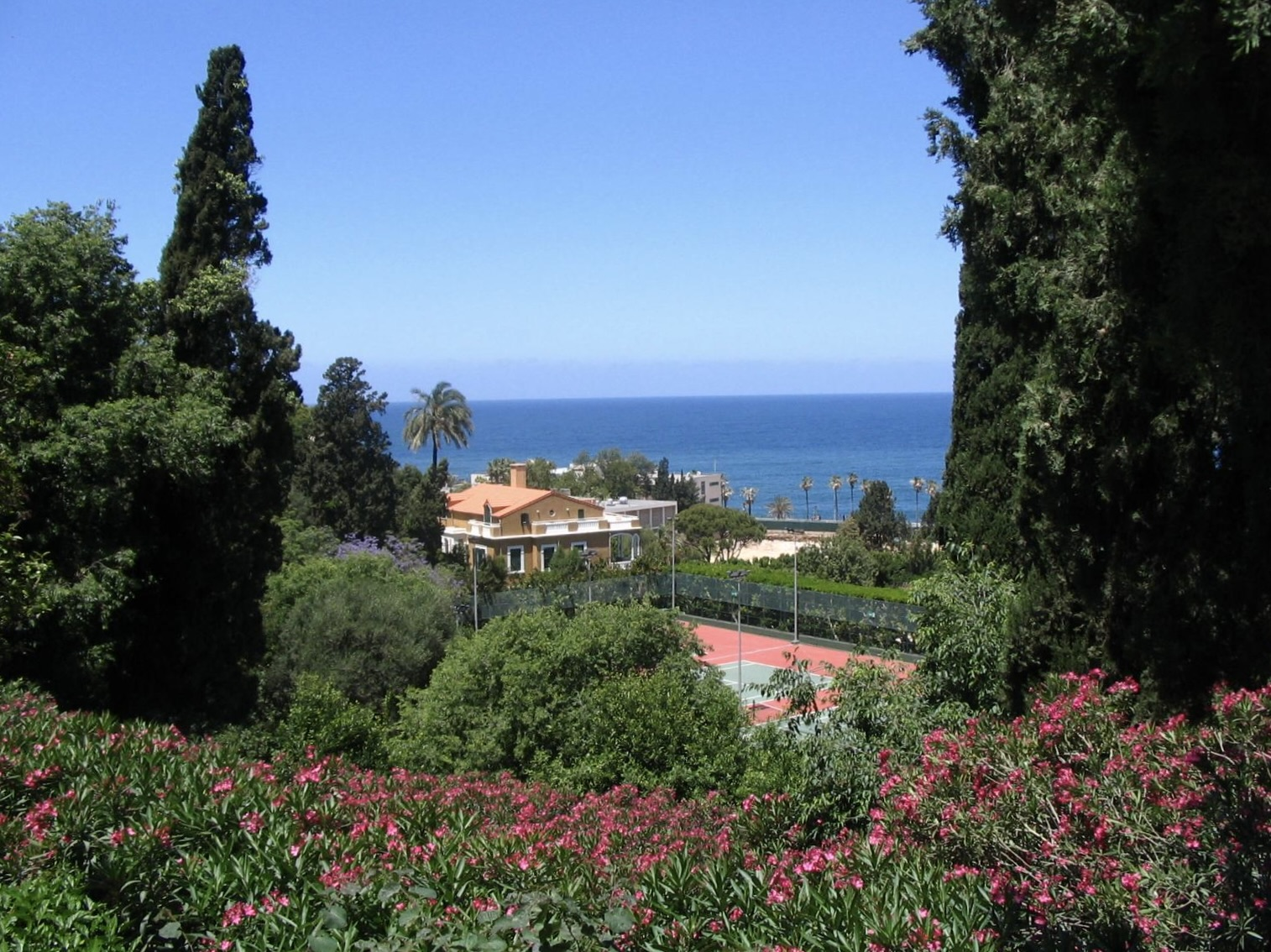
Looking towards the Mediterranean Sea, a view from within and of the campus of the American University of Beirut (formerly, the Syrian Protestant College) where Canaan studied medicine

Canaan was born in the village of Beit Jala in Palestine during the rule of the Ottoman Empire. As a child, he studied at the Schneller School, an institution founded by German missionaries in nearby Jerusalem. His father, Bechara, who was also schooled there, founded the first Lutheran church, YMCA, and co-ed school in Beit Jala and the first Arab pastor for the German Protestant Palestine Mission. His mother, Katharina, was raised in a German orphanage in Beirut and met Bechara while working at a hospital in Jerusalem.

In 1898–99, Canaan went to Beirut to study medicine at the Syrian Protestant College. Obliged to work while studying as his father died of pneumonia shortly after his arrival, he graduated with distinction in 1905. His valedictory speech, "Modern Treatment", was likely his first published piece and broached the use of serums, animal organs and X-rays.

Canaan attributed his love of, interest in, and dedication to the people, culture and land of Palestine to his upbringing and the influence of his father who regularly took the family with him on his trips around the country. In the Jerusalem Quarterly, Khaled Nashef suggests Canaan's knowledge of nature in Palestine as exhibited in writings such as "Plant-lore in Palestinian Superstition" (1928) among others were informed by these trips.

== Medical career ==
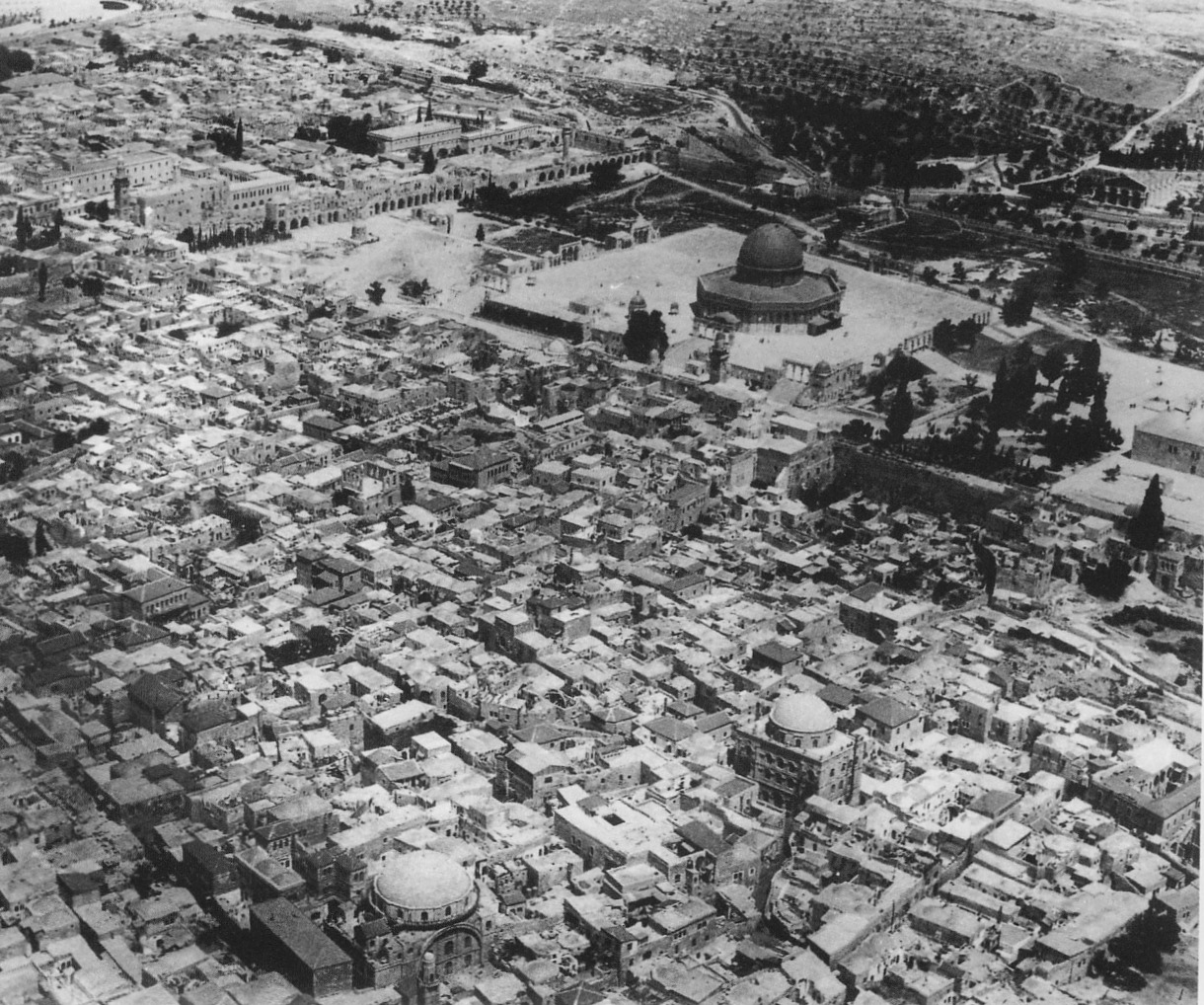
The Old City of Jerusalem in the 1900s

Returning to Jerusalem from Beirut, Canaan began work in the German Deaconesses Hospital [German], co-administering it with Dr. Adalbert Einsler (1848–1919) during a senior physician's absence in 1906. He was also sought as a manager at the German-Jewish Hospital (Shaare Zedek). His first published medical article as a practicing physician, “Cerebro-Spinal Meningitis in Jerusalem" (1911), was based on studies he conducted with the director there.

Between 1912 and 1914, Canaan travelled to Germany several times to further his knowledge of microbiology and tropical diseases. He met his wife, Margot Eilender, in an Esperanto class on his first trip there. Margot's father was a German importer and she was born and raised in Palestine. They were quickly married, having their first child Yasma that same year, and built their family home in the al-Musrarah district of Jerusalem in 1913, where their three other children (Theo, Nada, and Leila) were born. In that home, Canaan also opened the only Arab clinic operating in Jerusalem at the time.

One of the physicians Canaan collaborated with in Germany was Hans Müch, head of a mission to Palestine whose 1913 report on tuberculosis included three research papers authored by Canaan. That same year, he was appointed director of the Malaria Branch of the International Health Bureau, a world center for medical research and microscopic examination founded by The German Society for Fighting Malaria, The Jewish Health Bureau, and The Jewish Physicians and Scientists for Improving Health in Palestine. He served patients at the Arab General Hospital in the hilltop village of Sheikh Badr next to Jerusalem.

=== World War I, end of the Ottoman empire, beginning of the Mandate for Palestine ===
Canaan was working in the German Hospital in Jerusalem in 1914 when World War I began in October. As a citizen of the Ottoman Empire, which administered Palestine at the time, he was drafted as an officer into the Ottoman army. First assigned as a physician to a contingent in Nazareth, he was transferred that same year to 'Awja al-Hafeer. He was appointed Head of the Laboratories on the Sinai Front by the German chief physician in charge there, a position that allowed Canaan to travel between Bir as-Saba, Beit Hanoun, Gaza, and Shaykh Nouran, as well as Damascus, Amman, and Aleppo. During this period, he collected more than 200 amulets to add to a collection he had begun in the early 20th century.

He contracted both cholera and typhus during the war and survived, though his brother Wadia was killed in the fighting and buried at the Zion cemetery in Jerusalem. Soon after the end of the war, in 1919, Canaan was appointed Director of The Leprosy Hospital (Asylum of the Lepers Jesushilfe, now Hansen House) in Talbiyyah, the only leprosy hospital in Syria, Palestine, and the Transjordan. Considered an incurable disease at the time, Canaan contributed to research in the fields of bacteriology and microscopic examination that resulted in the discovery of a cure using chaulmoogra oil.

With the reopening of the German Hospital in 1923, Canaan was appointed head of the Internal Medicine Division, a position he held until the hospital had to cease operations in 1940. Between 1924 and 1927, Heráclides César de Souza Araújo led a word-wide inquiry on leprosy, for which Canaan wrote the report about Palestine, establishing his reputation in as an expert in this pathology at the international level.

Over the course of his medical career, Canaan treated people from all classes and segments of Palestinian and Arab society. He was one of a number of physicians from Jerusalem to examine Sherif Hussein of Mecca in Amman before his death in 1931, and removed a bullet from the thigh of Abu Jildah, a notorious Palestinian rebel, in 1936. An entry on Canaan is included in the book Famous Doctors in Tropical Medicine (1932) by Dr. G. Olpp, director of the tropical medicine center in Tübingen, indicating he was well known & regarded within the medical community.

=== 1936 revolt, nationalist writings ===
Canaan's politics and strong sense of nationalism find clear expression in two of his published works: The Palestine Arab Cause (1936) and Conflict in the Land of Peace (1936).

Published in English, Arabic, and French, The Palestine Arab Cause was a 48-page booklet that collated a series of articles Canaan authored for the local and foreign press following the outbreak of the 1936 Arab revolt. Canaan described British policy in Palestine as, "a destructive campaign against the Arabs with the ultimate aim of exterminating them from their country." He questioned the nationality laws enacted by the Mandatory authorities which prevented Palestinian immigrants in the Americas, who had been citizens of the Ottoman Empire, from obtaining Palestinian citizenship in Mandate Palestine. Directed at influencing British public opinion, the writings were seen by the Mandatory authorities as subversive.

Conflict in the Land of Peace was penned to respond to an anonymous rebuttal of "The Palestine Arab Cause" that claimed European Jewish immigration to Palestine brought benefits, such as improvements in agriculture and the general health of the peasantry. Canaan delves more deeply into the Palestine problem and deconstructs the alleged benefits. For example, he concedes that Zionist settlers did contribute to controlling the malaria epidemic in Palestine through the draining of swamps, but notes that the workers who performed the actual task were Arabs, who thus transformed lands purchased by Zionist owners at very low prices into more valuable agricultural lands for their exclusive benefit. Recalling that dozens of the Egyptian labourers employed to dig the drainage channels died in the process, Canaan writes: "Baron De Rothschild supplied the money and the Egyptians gave their lives." Canaan further notes that the anonymous pamphleteer ignores that Palestinians and Arabs drained swamps in dozens of sites throughout Palestine, under the supervision of the Department of Health, with Arab financial support and volunteer labour, caring for and improving their own lands and lives.

Canaan was also co-signatory to a document sent to the Higher Arab Committee on 6 August 1936, and there is reason to believe that he supported Arab armed resistance. From 1936 onward, Canaan, clearly expressed his rejection of British policies, in particular the policy of Jewish Zionist immigration to Palestine.

=== Imprisonment of Canaan, his wife, and his sister ===
The onset of World War II meant that most German citizens had either left Palestine or been arrested by the British Mandatory authorities as enemy aliens. Canaan was arrested by the British Mandate authorities the same day that Britain and France declared war on Germany on 3 September 1939. Ordered released at his second court session, the Criminal Investigation Department intervened and had him imprisoned for nine weeks in Acre. His wife Margot and his sister Badra were also arrested, and imprisoned at a women's facility for criminal prisoners in Bethlehem; Margot for nine months, and Badra for four years. They were then held in Wilhelma, a German colony turned British detention camp for German Palestinians until their release in 1943.

Though Margot's arrest was primarily because of her German ancestry, both women were politically active, having helped found the Arab Women's Committee in Jerusalem in 1934. This charitable society took strong political stances, calling for civil disobedience and the continuation of the general strike that kicked off the 1936 revolt. Badra also served as the assistant secretary in the Palestinian delegation to The Eastern Women's Conference that was held in support of Palestine in Cairo in October 1938. These arrests of the Canaan family were part of the general British policy of suppressing Palestinian resistance to Zionism & British rule.

== Research & writings on Palestine ==
Canaan's interest in Palestinian peasantry (fellaheen) found its first public expression in an Arabic lecture he gave on "Agriculture in Palestine" in 1909. Published in German translation in the geographical journal Globus in 1911, it continues to be recognized as a useful historical reference for basic information on the development of Palestinian agriculture in the early 20th century. In this first article outside the field of medicine, Canaan exhibits his deep familiarity with the field of "Oriental Studies", referencing the work of Schumacher, Guthe and Burckhardt, alongside classical sources, like Strabo and Josephus, and Arab sources like Mujir ad-Din. Influenced by the Old Testament studies of Gustaf Dalman, Albrecht Alt, and Martin Noth, all of whom were personal acquaintances, Canaan used the Bible as a basic source to compare past and present agricultural practices. Canaan and Dalman co-headed the Evangelical German Institute beginning in 1903, and they shared the idea that it is not possible to understand the Old Testament without studying Palestinian folklore.

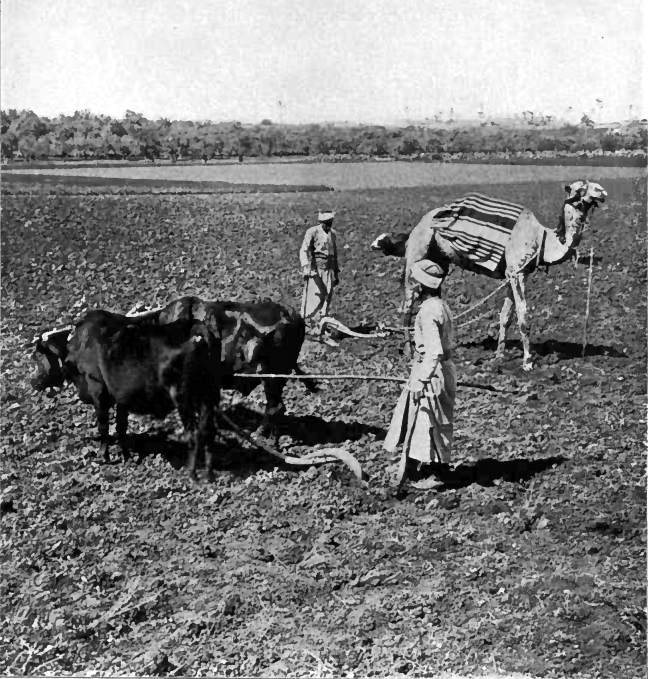
Farmers in Palestine as photographed by Dwight Lathrop Elmendorf in 1912

In "The Calendar of Palestinian Peasants," published by the Journal of the German Palestine Society (German: Zeitschrift des Deutschen Palästina-Vereins) in 1913, Canaan focused on traditional beliefs organizing the agricultural practices of Palestinian fellaheen. A significant observation recorded in this paper was that people in southern Palestine divided the year into 7 periods of 50 days, a type of pentecontad calendar. Subsequent scholars referencing his work traced the origins of this calendar system to Western Mesopotamia circa the 3rd millennium BCE, suggesting it was also used by the Amorites. Canaan's first book on Palestinian folklore practices was published in 1914 and entitled Superstition and Popular Medicine.

=== Palestine Oriental Society & its journal ===
A member of the American School for Oriental Research (established 1900), the Jerusalem branch of which was headed from 1920 to 1929 by the American archaeologist William Foxwell Albright, Canaan was also a member of the Palestine Oriental Society, (established in 1920 by Albert Tobias Clay). Albright was a lifelong friend of Canaan's, and edited his book Mohammedan Saints and Sancruaries (1927), as well as several of his articles, the last in 1962.

Canaan played a very active role in the Palestine Oriental Society, serving as a member of the board, as well as secretary and sometime treasurer from early in the 1920s through until 1948, though the last article he published in its journal was in 1937. Other articles Canaan published for the Journal of the Palestine Oriental Society (1920-1948) – such as, "Haunted Springs and Water Demons in Palestine" (1920–1921), "Tasit ar-Radjfeh" ("Fear Cup"; 1923), and "Plant-lore in Palestinian Superstition" (1928) – exhibit his deep interest in superstition.

Salim Tamari, director of the Institute of Jerusalem Studies, describes Canaan as the most prominent member of a school of "nativist" ethnographers who published their works in The Journal of the Palestine Oriental Society (JPOS). Their research and contributions were motivated by their belief that the "native culture of Palestine" was best represented in the traditions of the fellaheen, and that this ancient "living heritage" had to be urgently documented as the modern world encroached upon the Palestinian countryside. These Palestinian ethnographers included Omar Saleh al-Barghouti, Stephan Hanna Stephan, Elias Haddad, and Khalil Totah, and all of them (excepting Totah) were Jerusalemites, like Canaan.

=== Mohammedan Saints and Sanctuaries in Palestine ===
Mohammedan Saints and Sanctuaries in Palestine (1927) is identified by Meron Benvenisti as Canaan's "most outstanding contribution to the ethnography of Arab Palestine and to the annals of his country." In the introduction to the book, Canaan makes explicit his urgent motivation to document ancient, still practiced Palestinian traditions & beliefs threatened by Western influence and the spread of European educational models: "The primitive features of Palestine are disappearing so quickly that before long most of them will be forgotten."

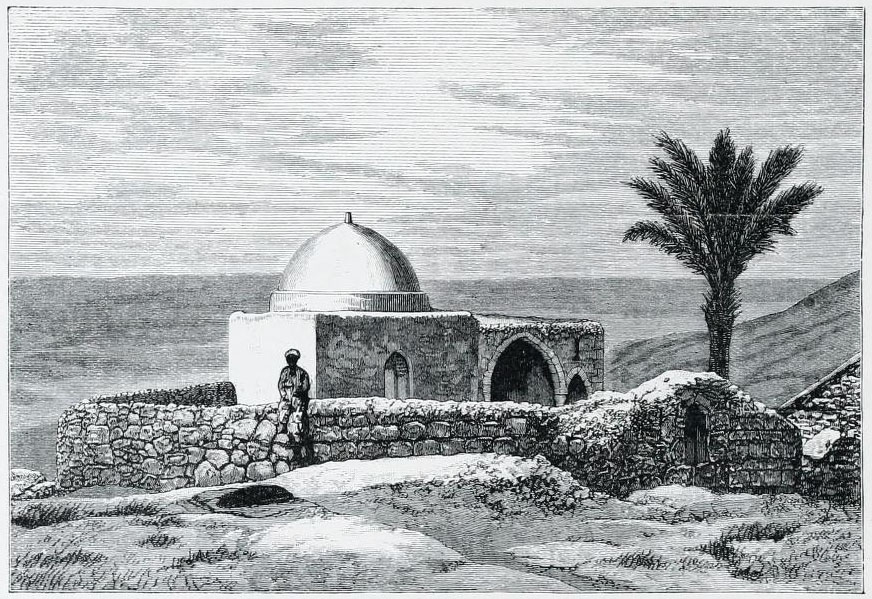
Maqam of Nabi Samit (Samson) in Sar'a, destroyed in the 1950s

The shrines (awlia), sanctuaries (maqamat) and popular religious practices in Palestine, with many local Muslim, Christian and Jewish rituals held in common are outlined in Canaan's work. He notes in the Preface that he personally visited 235 shrines and gathered documentation about 348 of them.

While local saints worshipped in Palestine can be said to be rooted in Muslim traditions, "they are actually ennobled sheikhs, who after their death, have been elevated to sainthood." Only one-tenth of the shrines surveyed in Canaan's work were dedicated to female saints, but they enjoyed relatively greater reverence compared to those of their male counterparts, with "60 per cent of the female saints enjoying a wide reputation, as compared to only 31 per cent of the male list."

Local Muslims, many of whom had never stepped into a mosque, honoured these village saints at awlia, often situated by trees or other natural landmarks, some at or nearby ancient sites of worship for the "local Baals of Canaan" given, as John Wilkinson puts it, a 'Muslim disguise'. Canaan saw these practices as evidence that the fellaheen were heirs to the practices of the earlier pre-monotheistic inhabitants of Palestine, "who built the first high places."

Also covered in this work are therapeutic bathing rituals people undertook to cure diseases and ailments, with descriptions of the specific water sources perceived to be especially holy or effective. Canaan noted how people with fevers, many from malaria, would drink from al-Suhada cistern in Hebron and bathe in springs in Silwan, Kolonia (Ein al-Samiya) and Nebi Ayyub (Ein al-Nebi Ayyub) and a well in Bayt Jibrin for al-Sheikh Ibrahim. Specific swamps were also considered to be sacred healing places. Al-Matbaa at Tel al-Sammam in the Plain of Esdraelon, associated with the wali ("saint") al-Sheik Ibrek, was widely renowned for curing sterility, rheumatism and nervous pains. Canaan noted that after washing in its water, women seeking to conceive would offer a present to al-Sheikh Ibrek.

=== Archaeology & ethnography ===
Among Canaan's acquaintances were a number of specialists in the field of Palestinian archaeology, including William Foxwell Albright, Nelson Glueck, and Kathleen Kenyon, and his interest in the history of the region naturally extended to the field of archaeology. In 1929, he participated in an archaeological expedition in Petra organized by George Horsfield, and discovered at its northern boundary a Kebaran shelter that he named Wadi Madamagh. That same year he published a five chapter article, "Studies in the Topography and Folklore of Petra", in the JPOS that included topographical maps with Arabic names for the features and sites that he collected from the local Bedouin population, along with oral histories associated with them. He also devoted a chapter to an ethnographic study of the Lijatne tribe, and politely dispelled their erroneous identification as "Simeonites or other Beni-Israel" by non-Arabic speaking authors, due to their sidelocks, noting it just happened to be a recent fashion among them at the time.

=== Collection of Palestinian amulets ===
Beginning in 1905 and through until 1947, part of the ethnographic fieldwork Canaan undertook consisted of amassing a collection of more than 1,400 amulets and other objects related to popular medicine and folk practices. He kept detailed records of his acquisitions and their applications, collecting many of these objects while working treating patients in Palestinian villages between 1913 and 1920, often purchasing them, but sometimes in lieu of payment or as gifts. Others were acquired similarly from patients who came to him from Palestinian cities and villages, as well as those who came from other Arab locales in Egypt, Syria, Lebanon, Jordan, Saudi Arabia, Iraq and Yemen.

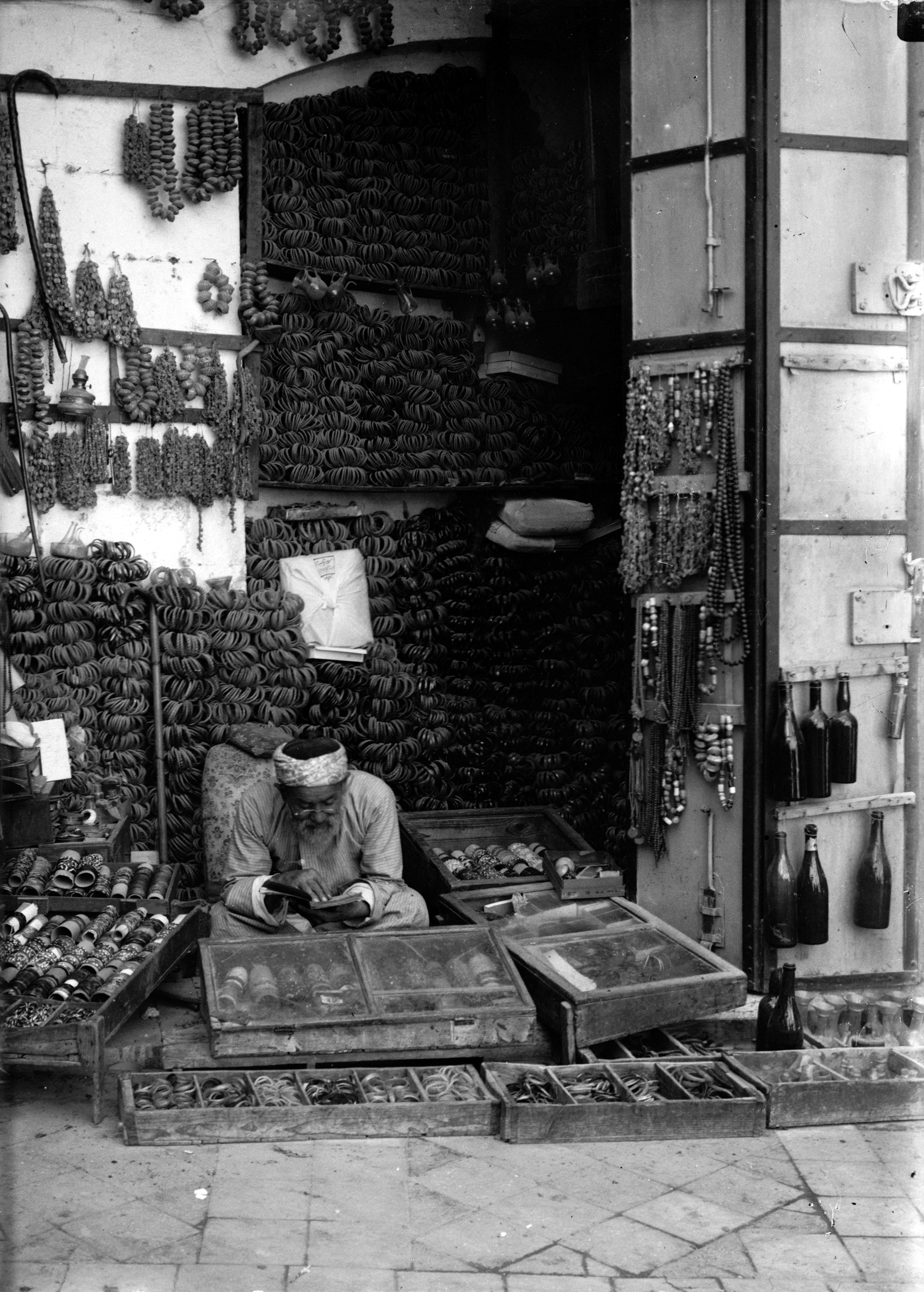
A jewellery store in Hebron where evil eye beads and Hebron glass bracelets are sold alongside the shopkeeper's main ware of silver or metal wire; photo by American Colony, Jerusalem, 1900–1920.

Still other sources included antiquity dealers in the Old City, as well as Sufi sheikhs and fortunetellers who prepared amulets whom Canaan counted among his many acquaintances; among these were Ibrahim Hassan al-Ansari, a custodian of the Haram al-Sharif (Temple Mount), Sheikh 'Atif ad-Disy, a Qadiriyyah follower, and Sheikh Mahmoud al-'Askari al-Falaki, a renowned maker of amulets in Jerusalem.

Though he was a doctor who practiced scientific medicine, Canaan held there was a close relationship between it and popular beliefs and superstitions marshalled to ward away and cure diseases. He sought to analyze this, conducting in-depth interviews with the individuals who wore and used talismans, complementing this first-hand testimony by consulting specialized sources on sorcery and witchcraft. He attempted to decipher the meanings of the symbols, shapes, writings, letters and numbers used in talismanic inscriptions and published an article on his findings in a journal produced by the Antiquities Museum of the American University in Beirut in 1937.

Drawing upon his medical background, Canaan further classified the amulets by etiology, diagnosis, prognosis, prophylaxis, and treatment under these chapter headings in his book Superstition and Popular Medicine (1914). Evil spirits, such as the Qarinah, "Mother of Boys", and the evil eye were identified as perceived sources of diseases. He also identified charms, amulets, glass beads and stones of all types and colors that were used as prophylactics. Hebron glass beads in the shape of eyes of various sizes were given names including rooster eye, baby camel eye and camel eye.

The chapter on treatment includes an extensive listing of a wide variety of amulets and talismans used by all classes of Palestinian and Arab society, such as "the soul's bead", "the cat's eye" (black or white bead, used primarily by Bedouin women to reignite their husband's love for them), and "the milk's bead" (white glass bead to encourage the production of breastmilk, its power associated with the Milk Grotto). Canaan also discusses the talismanic use of jewelry and semiprecious stones, as well as uses for parts of animal bones and tortoise shells, sometimes inscribed with talismanic formulas, which could be used to treat ailments; for eg. al-hitit-horn which he identifies as a potential treatment for poisoning. Keff Maryam ("Hand of Mary"), the desert Rose of Jericho, was also in his collection with a note that the water it was placed in to bloom was drunk for its healing properties.

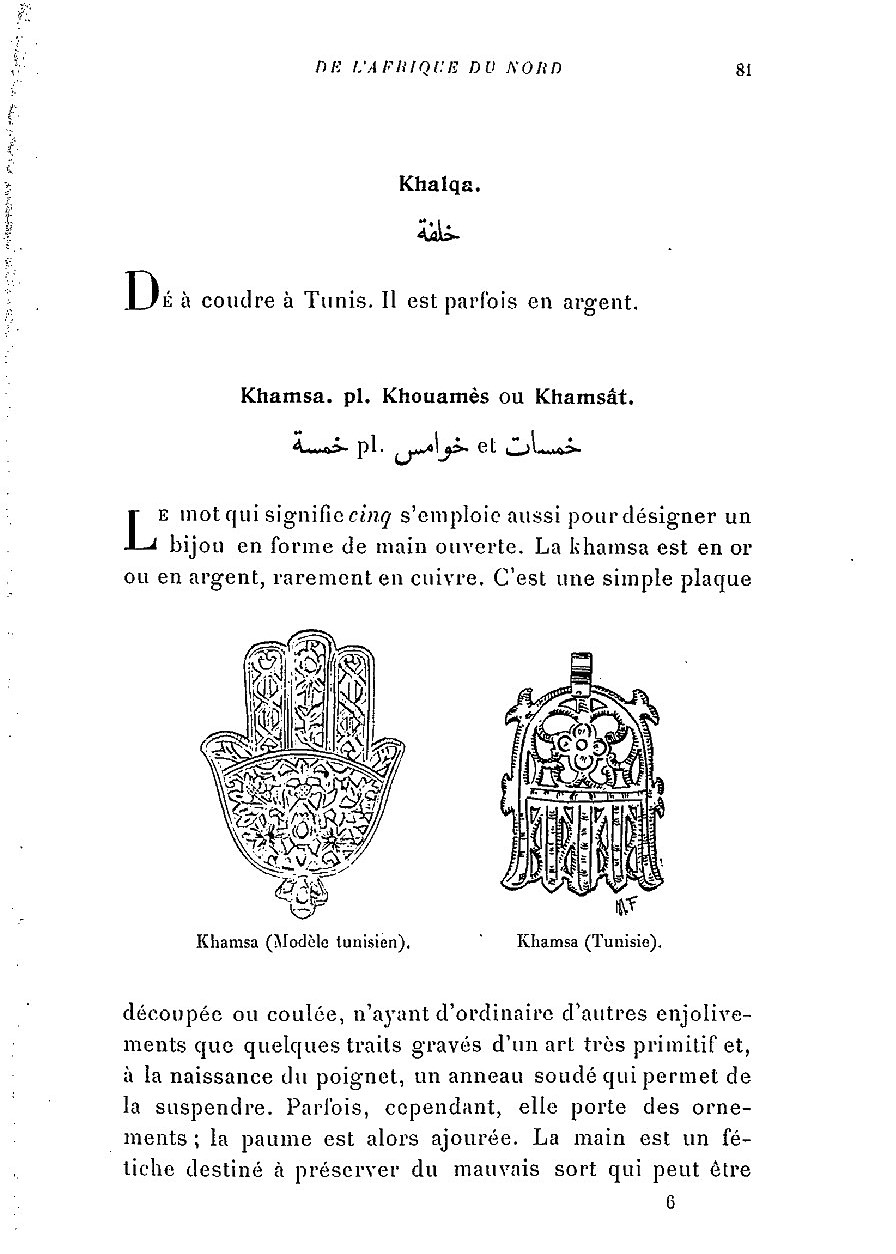
Page from a dictionary of North African jewellery depicting two stylized khamsas from Tunisia

The khamsa figures among the amulets in Canaan's collection with three named examples from Morocco acquired by purchase. This popular tradition of using representations of a human hand to ward off the evil eye is also represented in the natural objects he collected. One of these was a box containing sprays of rue, known as keff sabadie or ("hand of rue") because of the sprays similarity to a human hand (khamsa). The mother to whom the box belonged would hang the sprays of rue on her ill child's nightcap to ward away the evil eye and promote healing. Seeds of various fruit trees, such as lemon, were also used this way.

The sacred status of trees in Palestinian folk traditions accounts for the many twigs and sprigs in Canaan's collection. The branch of the mes-tree (celtis australis) that grows within the Haram al-Sharif compound in Jerusalem, for example, was placed in a necklace or on the head. The branch is said to have a special effect if harvested on Laylat al-Qadr (27 Ramadan), which in Islamic belief is the night the Quran was revealed.

Excepting some 230 amulets which were given to Henry Wellcome and are now part of the exhibits at the Pitt Rivers Museum in Oxford, the bulk of the collection was donated by Canaan's family to Birzeit University following his death. It also consists of:

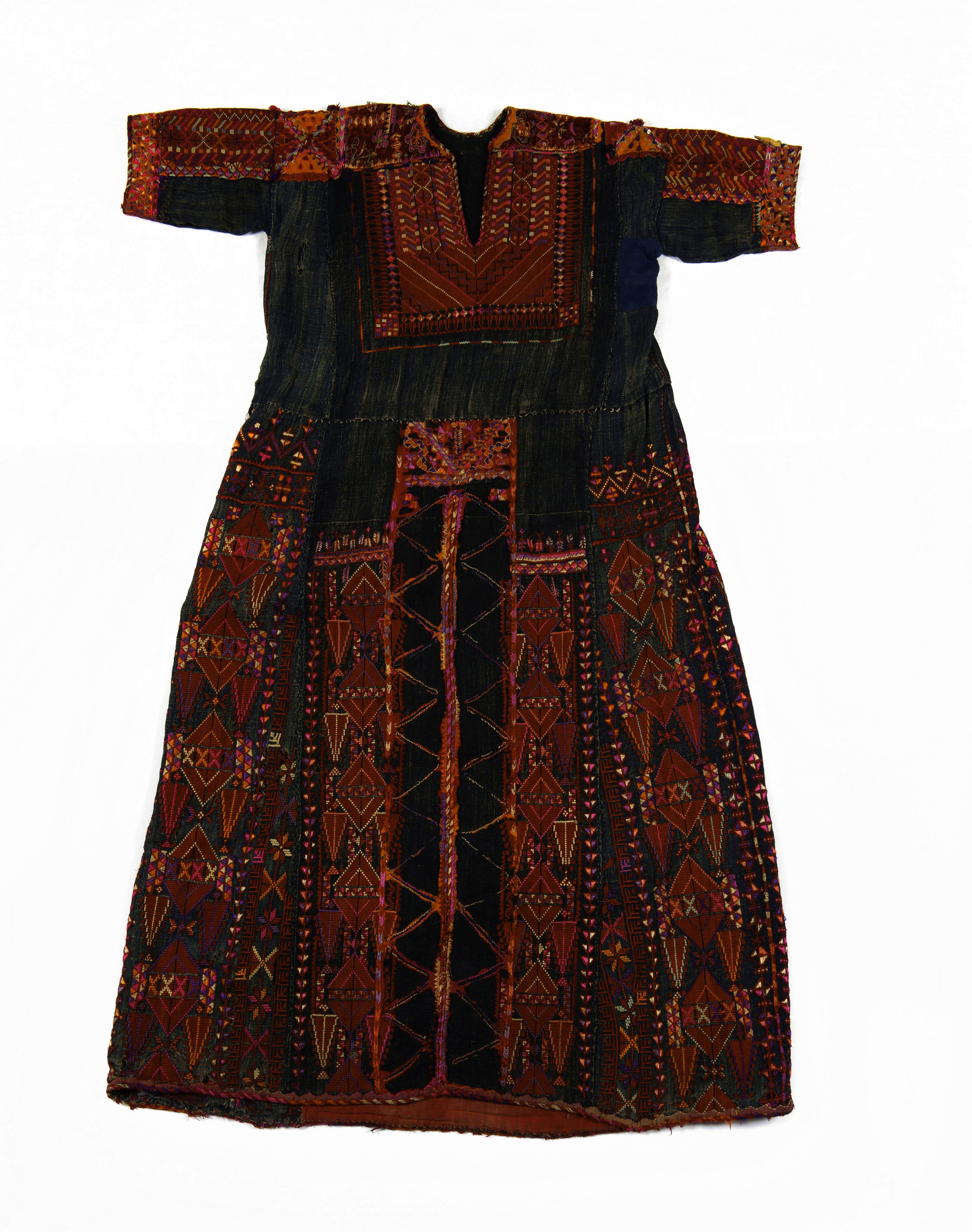
Tatreez patterns including the hujub amulet pattern (the diamond shape with two inverted triangles on either side) on a dress for a woman from Beit Dajan. An illustrative example of the widespread use of amulet symbolism in the costumes of the people of Palestine

- Amulets or talismans written on paper, often including prayers and supplications, and placed in triangular cloth, leather wraps, cylindrical silver cases (Arabic: khiyara or hijab) and hujub which were worn, sometimes as jewelry, or hung in homes for protection.
- Pilgrims' certificates bearing religious symbols of the three Semitic religions, in stamp or written form which were given to pilgrims who visited holy sites in Jerusalem and Hebron.
- Silver votive offerings, most of which are from Aleppo, Syria, and shaped in the form of the human body or its parts. These were hung in churches and on religious icons to heal illnesses and protect the health of children.
- Vessels, often copper or bronze, such as "fear cups" inscribed with Quranic verses and supplications, in which water was placed to be left under the light of the moon and stars for several nights before being given to an afflicted person to drink. Other ceramic dishes inscribed with talismans for curing diseases and facilitating childbirth.

The collection is considered a valuable resource for those interested in manifestations of magic in the popular beliefs underpinning folk medicine practices in Palestinian and Arab societies.

== War & Nakba ==
=== Arab Medical Society of Palestine ===
The Arab Medical Society of Palestine was established in August 1944, based on a decision taken at the Arab Medical Conference in Haifa ten years earlier. A coordinating body for medical associations in cities throughout Palestine, Canaan was its first president. He was also a member of the editorial board for the Society's journal, al-Majallah at-Tibbiyyah al-'Arabiyyah al-Filastiniyyah ("The Palestinian Arab Medical Journal"), the first issue of which was published in Arabic and English in December 1945. The Society also organized medical conferences, the first of which was in July 1945.

As the situation in Palestinian cities and villages became increasingly insecure, the Society trained and organized relief units and centers to provide medical aid to civilians and the Palestinian and Arab militants fighting to defend them. Contacting and coordinating with the Red Cross to protect hospitals and other humanitarian institutions, the Society also made appeals to medical associations to send help, and limited medical aid was sent by some in the Arab world. Canaan was also a founding member of the Higher Arab Relief Committee, established on 24 January 1948, to receive aid coming to the country and supervise its distribution.

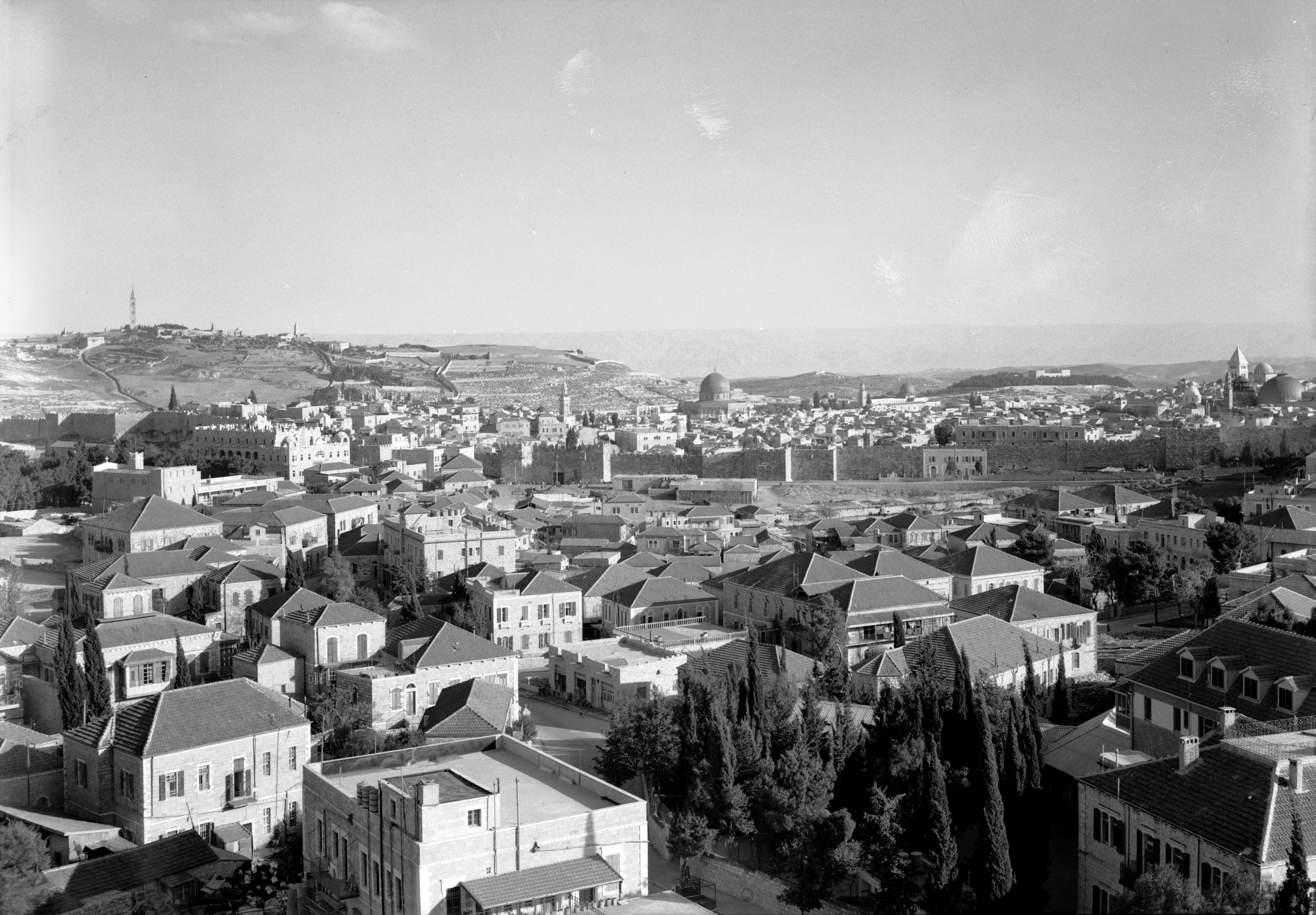
Al-Musrarah neighborhood where Canaan and his family built their home in 1913, as pictured between 1934 and 1939 from the tower of the Italian Hospital

=== The Nakba ===
During the Battle for Jerusalem, bombs and mortar shells hit Arab houses in al-Musrarah quarter where the Canaan family home, including Tawfiq's clinic, was located on 22 February 1948. To protect the children, they were moved to a safer location, but Tawfiq, Margot, Badra, and Nora (his sister-in-law) stayed to ensure the clinic would continue to serve the people being impacted by the bombings and in need of medical care. They were forced to leave following a direct hit on the home/clinic on 9 May 1948. The entire extended family reunited after securing a room at a convent in the Old City run by the Greek Orthodox Patriarch of Jerusalem, and they lived there for two and a half years. Canaan's daughter Leila Mantoura wrote of this time:

"Mother and father would go daily to the top of the Wall of Jerusalem to look at their home. They witnessed it being ransacked, together with the wonderful priceless library and manuscripts, which mother guarded jealously and with great pride. They saw mother's Biedermeyer furniture being loaded into trucks and then their home being set on fire."

Canaan's family home, his clinic, library, and three manuscripts ready for publication were all either destroyed or looted. Fortunately, his collection of amulets and icons survived, as it had already been entrusted to an international organization in the western part of Jerusalem earlier that same year for safekeeping.

Undeterred by this loss, and determined to continue his work as physician, Canaan treated patients out of his temporary home in the convent. He also continued his work as head of the Arab Medical Society of Palestine, advocating for the rights of people to medical treatment. Following arduous negotiations with the Mandate Government, he managed to secure a wide base of operations for the Arab Medical Society of Palestine to administer and provide medical services at the Central Hospital and the Austrian Hospice Hospital in Jerusalem, the Infectious Diseases Hospital near Beit Safafa, and the Mental Hospital in Bethlehem. The Central Hospital, including its facilities in the Russian Compound (al-Mascobiyyah), was administered by Canaan's colleague As'ad Bishara, while Canaan oversaw the operations at the Austrian Hospice Hospital. Both were officially under the Society's administration by May 1948, and received and treated the wounded and the sick during the 1948 Arab-Israeli war.

Unfortunately, the provision of services as the Central Hospital, which flew a flag of the Red Cross, came to an end only a few months after it began. The hospital and its surrounding homes were subject to continuous shelling from Jewish militias, impeding operations, restricting patient access, and causing significant destruction. Jewish militants then occupied part of the hospital and the surrounding homes, which ultimately forced The Society to evacuate in October 1948.

Canaan and the staff of the Austrian Hospice Hospital continued providing medical treatment during the Battle for Jerusalem but were also eventually forced to evacuate because of non-stop shelling as hostilities intensified.

== Post-Nakba ==
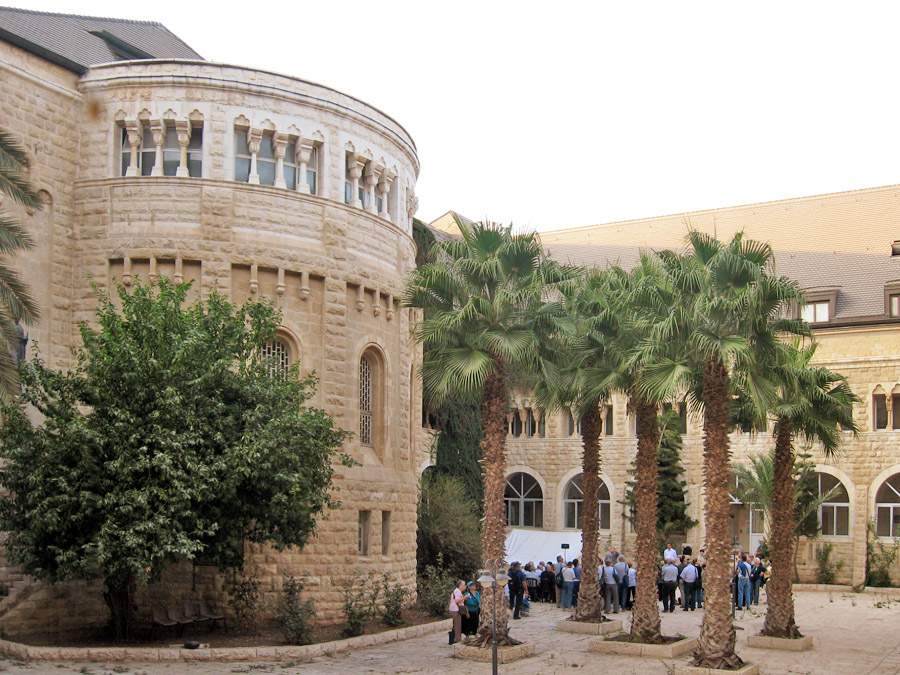
The courtyard of the Augusta Victoria hospital where Canaan resided until his death in 1964

With the 1949 Armistice Agreements, open hostilities subsided, and East Jerusalem and the rest of the West Bank fell under Jordanian control. Canaan was appointed manager of the medical operations of the Lutheran World Federation (LWF) which was primarily concerned with providing services to the many Palestinian refugees displaced from West Jerusalem and other parts of Palestine that fell under Israeli control. Part of this work included the establishment of clinics were which set up at the Saint John Hospice in the Old City of Jerusalem, and in 'Aizariyyeh, Hebron, Beit Jala, and Taybeh in the West Bank. He also oversaw operations for LWF's mobile clinics which were used to provide services to rural areas.

By 1950, the situation in East Jerusalem was stable enough for the restoration of the provision of hospital services at the Austrian Hospice Hospital, now known as Augusta Victoria Hospital. Canaan assisted in this, in cooperation with the United Nations Relief and Works Agency (UNRWA) and the LWF. He was appointed the first medical director of the newly inaugurated hospital, which located in the same building he forced to flee from in 1948 on the Mount of Olives (Jabal al-Tur. He and his family were provided residence on the hospital grounds.

While his livelihood and a place to live had been restored, his personal losses continued. His son Theo died in 1954 while renovating an archaeological monument in Jerash. When he retired from his position as medical director in 1957 at the age of 75, Canaan was granted permanent residence in a home on the hospital grounds called Gardner's House. He spent his last days there with his surviving family, continuing his research and writing in the field of ethnography. "Crime in the Traditions and Customs of the Arabs in Jordan" was the last article he composed, and was published in German in Zeitschrift des Deutschen Palästinavereins in 1964, probably posthumously, as he died on 15 January 1964. His grave is in the Evangelical Lutheran Cemetery in Bethlehem, which is directly adjacent to the village of his birth, Beit Jala.

== Awards ==
- Order of the Red Crescent (in World War I)
- Iron Cross of 1914
- Holy Sepulchre Cross with a red ribbon, awarded by the Greek Orthodox Patriarch (1951)
- Order of Merit of the Federal Republic of Germany (1951)

== Published works ==
(Partial list)

=== Folklore and ethnography ===
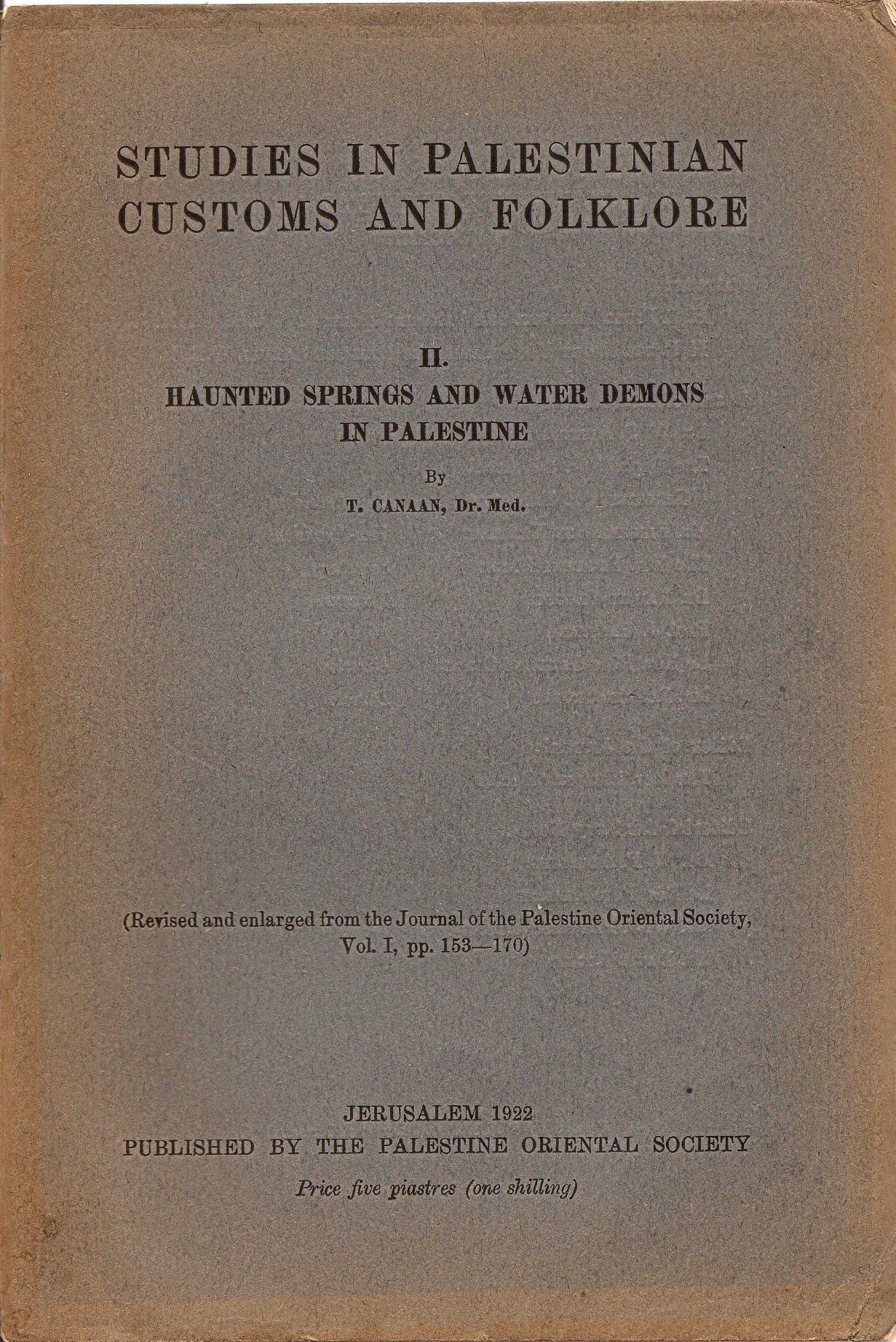
The cover of Haunted Springs and Water Demons in Palestine, published in 1922

- "Der Ackerbau in Palästina (Agriculture in Palestine)". Globus; illustrierte Zeitschrift für Länder- und Völkerkunde (in German). 96: 268-272, 283-286. 1909.
- "Demons as an Aetiological Factor in Popular Medicine". Al-Kulliyeh. Beirut. 1912.
- "Der Kalender des palästinensischen Fellachen (The Calendar of Palestinian Peasants)". Zeitschrift des Deutschen Palästina-Vereins (in German). 36 (4): 266–300. 1913.
- Scragg, D. G. (1914). Superstition and Popular Medicine. Centre for Anglo-Saxon Studies, University of Manchester. ISBN 1-871034-01-9.
- Canaan, Tawfiq (1921). "Haunted Springs and Water Demons in Palestine". The Journal of the Palestine Oriental Society. 1. Jerusalem: The Palestine Oriental Society: 153–170.
  - Alternative: Haunted Springs and Water Demons in Palestine. Jerusalem: Palestine Oriental Society. 1922. OCLC 187062829. See also Jumana Emil Abboud
- Canaan, Tawfiq (1922). "Byzantine Caravan Routes in the Negev". The Journal of the Palestine Oriental Society. 2. Jerusalem: The Palestine Oriental Society: 139–144.
- Canaan, Tawfiq (1923). "Folklore of the seasons in Palestine". The Journal of the Palestine Oriental Society. 3. Jerusalem: The Palestine Oriental Society: 21–35.
- Canaan, Tawfiq (1923). "Tasit ar-Radjfeh ("Fear Cup")". The Journal of the Palestine Oriental Society. 3. Jerusalem: The Palestine Oriental Society: 122–131.
- Canaan, Tawfiq (1927). Mohammedan Saints and Sanctuaries in Palestine. London: Luzac & Co. Archived from the original on 16 May 2019.
  - Alt:Canaan, Tawfiq (1927). Mohammedan Saints and Sanctuaries in Palestine. London: Luzac & Co.
- "Plant-lore in Palestinian Superstition". The Journal of the Palestine Oriental Society. VIII: 129-168. 1928.
- Belief in Demons in the Holy Land (in German). 1929.
- "Additions to "Studies in the Topography and Folklore of Petra"". The Journal of the Palestine Oriental Society. IX: 178-180. 1929.
- "Light and Darkness in Palestine Folklore". Journal of the Palestine Oriental Society: 15-36. 1931.
- "Unwritten Laws Affecting the Arab Women of Palestine" (PDF). Journal of the Palestine Oriental Society. 1931. Archived from the original (PDF) on 2 October 2011.
- "The Palestinian Arab House, Its Architecture and Folklore". Journal of the Palestine Oriental Society. 12: 223-247. 1932. (Part I)
- "The Palestinian Arab House, Its Architecture and Folklore". Journal of the Palestine Oriental Society. XIII. Jerusalem: The Syrian Orphanage Press: 1-83. 1933. (Part II)
- "Arabic Magic Bowls". Journal of the Palestine Oriental Society. 16: 79-127. 1936.
- "The curse in Palestinian folklore". Journal of the Palestine Oriental Society. 15: 235–279. 1935.
- "The Saqr Bedouin of Bisan". Journal of the Palestine Oriental Society. 16: 21–32. 1936.
- "Book Review of Dalman's Arbeit und Sitte in Palästina". Journal of the Palestine Oriental Society. 14: 147-151. 1934.
- "Review of Granquist's Marriage Conditions in a Palestinian Village". Journal of the Palestine Oriental Society. 1933–1937.
- "The Decipherment of Arabic Talismans". Berytus Archaeological Studies. 4: 69–110. 1937.
- "The Decipherment of Arabic Talismans". Berytus Archaeological Studies. 5: 141–151. 1938.
- Canaan, T (October 1962). "Superstition and Folklore about Bread". Bulletin of the American Schools of Oriental Research. 167 (167). The American Schools of Oriental Research: 36–47. doi:10.2307/1355686. ISSN 0003-097X. JSTOR 1355686. S2CID 163293237.
- "The 'Azazme Bedouin and Their Region". Arab World Geographer. 2 (4). Winter 1999. Archived from the original on 10 August 2007. (translated from German by William Templer)
  - orig: "Die 'Azazme-Beduinen and ihr Gegiet". Zeitschrift des Deutschen Palästina-Vereins (in German). 51.

=== Politics ===
- "Two Documents on the Surrender of Jerusalem". Journal of the Palestine Oriental Society. 9: 27-31. 1929.
- The Palestine Arab Cause. 1936. (48-page booklet)
- Conflict in the Land of Peace. 1936. (Published in English, Arabic, and French)

=== Medical ===
- "Modern Treatment". Al-Muqtataf. Beirut. 1905.
- "Cerebro-Spinal Meningitis in Jerusalem". Al-Kulliyeh. Beirut. 1911.
- "Beobachtungen bei einer Denguefieberepidemie in Jerusalem ("Observations on an epidemic of dengue fever in Jerusalem")". Archiv für Schiff- und Tropenhygiene (in German). 17: 20–25. 1912.
- "Die Jerichobeule". Archiv für Schiff- und Tropenhygiene (in German). 20: 109–119. 1916.
- Canaan, T (1929). "The Oriental Boil: An Epidemiological Study in Palestine". Transactions of the Royal Society of Tropical Medicine and Hygiene. 23: 89–94. doi:10.1016/S0035-9203(29)90903-2.
- "Zur Epidemiologie der Orientbeule in Palästina". Dermatologische Wochenschrift (in German). 29 (91): 1779. 1930.
- "Kalazar in Palestine". Festschrift Bernhard Nocht (in German). 80: 67–71. 1937.
- "Topographical studies in leishmaniasis in Palestine". Journal of the Palestinian Arab Medical Association. 1: 4–12. 1945.
- Canaan T (1951). "Intestinal parasites in Palestine". J. Med. Liban. 4 (3): 163–69. PMID 14898190.

== See also ==
- Saint George Interfaith shrine
- Palestinian Christians

== Bibliography ==
- Abdullah, Wissam (June 2000). "Special Feature: The Tawfik Canaan Collection of Palestinian Amulets – Birzeit University". This Week in Palestine. No. 26.
- Benvenisti, Meron (2000). Sacred Landscape: The Buried History of the Holy Land since 1948. Berkeley: University of California Press. p. 253. ISBN 0-520-21154-5. "."
- Bernstein, Deborah S. (2000). Constructing Boundaries: Jewish and Arab Workers in Mandatory Palestine. Albany: SUNY Press. ISBN 0-7914-4539-9.
- Davis, Rochelle (January 2004). "Peasant Narratives Memorial Book Sources for Jerusalem Village History". Jerusalem Quarterly (20): 62. doi:10.70190/jq.I20.p62. Archived from the original on 28 September 2007.
- El-Eini, Roza (2006). Mandated Landscape: British Imperial Rule in Palestine (1929–1948). New York: Routledge. ISBN 0-7146-5426-4.
- Eisler, Ejal Jakob (איל יעקב איזלר); Frutiger, Hans Hermann (2008). Johannes Frutiger (1836–1899): ein Schweizer Bankier in Jerusalem (in German). Cologne et al: Böhlau. ISBN 978-3-412-20133-3.
- Irving, Sarah R. (2017). Intellectual networks, language and knowledge under colonialism: the work of Stephan Stephan, Elias Haddad and Tawfiq Canaan in Palestine, 1909-1948 (PDF) (PhD thesis). University of Edinburgh. hdl:1842/31179.
- al-Ju'beh, Baha' (Fall–Winter 2005). "Magic and Talismans: The Tawfiq Canaan Collection of Palestinian Amulets" (PDF). Jerusalem Quarterly (22–23): 103. doi:10.70190/jq.I22.p103.
- Kirkbride, Diana V. W. (1958). "A Kebaran Rock Shelter in Wadi Madamagh, Near Petra, Jordan". Man. 58 (April). Royal Anthropological Institute of Great Britain and Ireland: 55–58. doi:10.2307/2794154. JSTOR 2794154.
- Lapp, Paul W.; Albright, W. F. (April 1964). "Tawfiq Canaan in Memoriam". Bulletin of the American Schools of Oriental Research. 174 (174). The American Schools of Oriental Research: 1–3. doi:10.1086/BASOR1356065. JSTOR 1356065. S2CID 166964584.
- Mershen, Birgit (2006). Huebner Ulrich (ed.). "Tawfiq Canaan and His Contribution to the Ethnography of Palestine". Palaestina exploranda: Studien zur Erforschung Palästinas im 19. und 20. Jahrhundert anlässlich des 125jährigen Bestehens des Deutschen Vereins zur Erforschung Palästinas: 251–264.
- Nashef, Khaled (November 2002). "Tawfik Canaan: His Life and Works" (PDF). Jerusalem Quarterly (16): 12–26. doi:10.70190/jq.I16.p12.
- Patai, Raphael (1957). Jordan, Lebanon, and Syria: an annotated bibliography. New Haven: HRAF Press. ASIN B002A16RCM. OCLC 174331967.
- Polley, Gabriel (5 March 2024). "Not Forgotten, Not (All) Erased: Palestine's Sacred Shrines". The Markaz Review.
- Probert, M. A. Garcia (12 January 2021). "Exploring the life of amulets in Palestine: from healing and protective remedies to the Tawfik Canaan Collection of Palestinian Amulets". University of Leiden.
- Probert, Marcela A. Garcia. "Chapter 10 Twigs in the Tawfik Canaan Collection of Palestinian Amulets". Amulets and Talismans of the Middle East and North Africa in Context (April 19, 2022): 253–274.
- Probert, Marcela Garcia. "Tawfiq Canaan, the Collector of Amulets" (PDF). Jerusalem Quarterly. 102 (Summer 2025): 25.
- Raheb, Mitri (1990). "Das reformatorische Erbe unter den Palästinensern". Zur Entstehung der Evangelisch-lutherischen Kirche in Jordanien (= die Lutherische Kirche, Geschichte und Gestalten) (in German). 11. Gütersloh: Mohn: 91–96. ISBN 3-579-00127-2. Originally presented in 1988 as author's thesis (doctoral) at Fachbereich Evangelische Theologie of Philipps-Universität in Marburg
- Richards, D. S. (2002). The Annals of the Saljuq Turks: Selections from Al-Kāmil Fīʻl-Taʻrīkh of ʻIzz Al-Dīn Ibn Al-Athīr. New York: Routledge. ISBN 0-7007-1576-2.
- Sperling, Arthur (1917). Hygienische Morgentoilette: Gymnastik und Selbstmassage für Gesunde und Kranke (in German). Vol. 27. Munich: Verlag der Ärztlichen Rundschau Otto Gmelin. OCLC 218409429.
- Sufian, Sandra Marlene (2007). Healing the land and the nation: malaria and the Zionist project in Palestine, 1920–1947 (Illustrated ed.). University of Chicago Press. ISBN 978-0-226-77935-5.
- Tamari, Salim (2009). "Lepers, Lunatics and Saints: The Nativist Ethnography of Tawfiq Canaan and his Jerusalem Circle". Mountain Against the Sea. Berkeley: University of California Press. ISBN 978-0-520-25129-8.
- Taylor, Jane (2001). Petra and the Lost Kingdom of the Nabataeans. London: I.B.Tauris. ISBN 1-86064-508-9.
- Taylor, Joan E. (1993). Christians and the holy places: the myth of Jewish-Christian origins (Illustrated ed.). Oxford University Press. ISBN 978-0-19-814785-5.
- Taylor, Joan E. (2003). Jewish Women Philosophers of First Century Alexandria. Oxford: Oxford University Press. ISBN 0-19-929141-1.
- U.S. Agricultural Research Service (1932). Charles Wardell Stiles (ed.). Index-catalogue of medical and veterinary zoology. Washington, D.C.: U.S. Government Printing Office.
- Yellow Fever Bureau, Liverpool School of Tropical Medicine (1912). Bulletin. Vol. 2. Liverpool: University Press. OCLC 1640456.
