= Mahmoud al-'Askari al-Falaki =

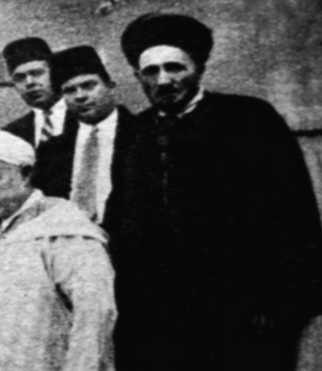
- Sayyed Mahmoud al-Askari al-Falaki in 1948 in Cairo
- Born: Mahmoud al'Askari; Palestine
- Other name: Sheikh al-Falaki
- Occupations: Astrologer, amulet maker
- Years active: 1902-1948

Mahmoud al-'Askari al-Falaki (Arabic:محمود العسكري الفلكي), also known as Sheikh al-Falaki, was a Sufi sheikh and sayyed, a professional astrologer who served in the court of an Ottoman Sultan, and well known maker of amulets and practitioner of folk medicine in Jerusalem at the time of the Ottoman Empire and the British Mandate of Palestine.

== Birth & Service to the Sultan ==
Sources agree that al-Falaki was born in Palestine without providing a birthdate, but conflict as to the precise village or city of origin, giving two different locations: al-Dhahiriyyah in the district of al-Khalil or Jerusalem.

Al-Falaki is frequently referred to as al-Sharif or sayyed and one extant photograph shows him where wearing a black turban. He was a Sufi of the Khalwati order and his family were descendants of Ahl al-Bayt, progeny of the Prophet Mohammed.

It is known that he travelled to Istanbul in 1902 to serve in the court of Sultan Abdul Hamid II as his personal astrologer, and that the Sultan granted him the honorific of Pasha. The Sultan was deposed in 1909 and the Ottoman Empire dissolved with the end of World War I, and al-Falaki must have returned to Jerusalem around this time.

== Writings ==
=== Magazine of the Planetary Movements on the World of Property ===
In Jerusalem, al-Falaki authored a magazine containing an astronomical calendar with prayer timetables, called "Magazine of the Planetary Movements on the World of Property" (Arabic:مجلة الأفلاك في عالم الأملاك, Majallat al-Aflak Fi 'Alam il-Amlak). Like many others dedicated to determining precise prayer times for urban centers, al-Falaki used a sine quadrant to calculate prayer times for Jerusalem.

=== Precious Selection from the Knowledge of the Prophet of God Idris ===
He also authored a book while in Jerusalem, sharing part of his knowledge of the stars, the crafting of amulets and ilm al-huruf ("knowledge of letters") in a book entitled: Precious Selection From The Knowledge Of The Prophet Of God Idris (المنتخب النفيس من علم نبى الله ادريس al-muntakhab al-nafīs min ʿilm nabī allah idrīs). It was published by more than one publisher in Egypt, beginning in 1923.

The book's preface is entitled, "Important Notice", and in it he outlines his motivation for writing it was to preserve ancient knowledge which he believed emanated from the prophet Idris (biblical Enoch) through Hermes and Abbas ibn Firnas, knowledge he saw as part of a sacred Arab legacy and heritage that had been distorted and was in danger of disappearing.

== Astrology, forecasting, amulet making & folk medicine in Jerusalem ==
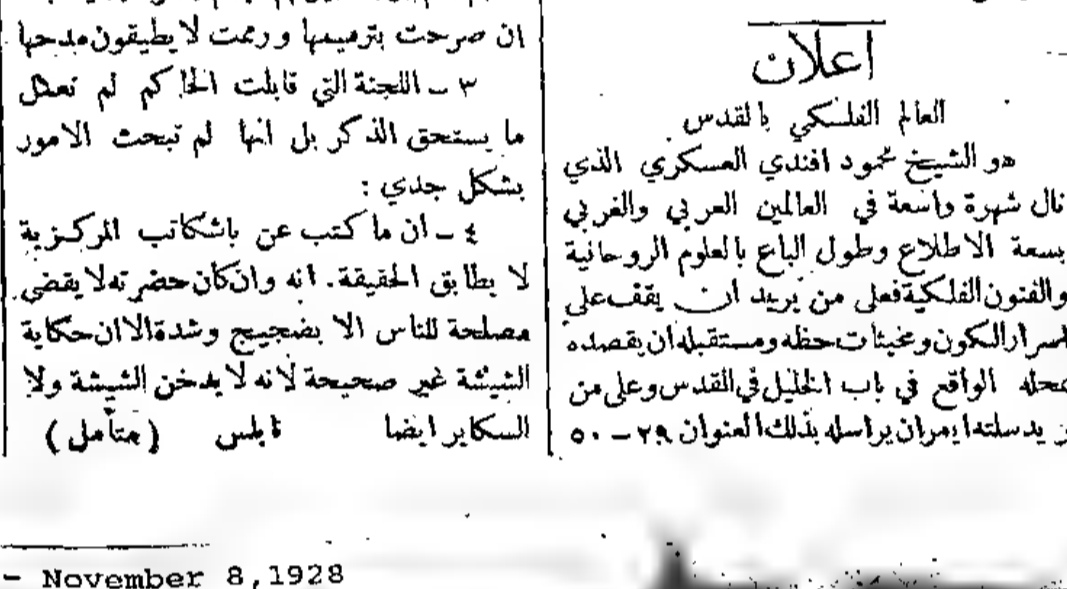
His name is recorded here as "Sheikh Mahmoud Effendi al-'Askari"

Sheikh al-Falaki enjoyed some regional renown with notices about him in Al-Shura newspaper (established in 1924 by Muhammed Ali al-Taher) in Cairo announcing his skill as an astrologer and forecaster, and his presence and availability just outside the Old City by Bab al-Khalil. He would provide personal consultations in an area there known as jawrat al-ʿenāb, so named for the Ziziphus jujuba trees found in abundance there, which provided some of the raw material for the amulets he produced. Such amulets could be simple, natural twigs from the trees over which blessings would be uttered, while others were inscribed with special characters and invocations. Trees are considered to be manahil, markers of sacred spots and water sources in Palestinian folklore, and indeed a large water reservoir known as the Sultan's Pool lay adjacent to the grove. The jujube tree in particular was used to treat bulges by taking its twigs with small knots in them, breaking them at the place of the knots, and tying them onto clothing.

Sheikh al-Falaki known to be an acquaintance of Tawfiq Canaan and is mentioned by name in his notes as one of the donors of amulets to his vast collection. He is speculated to have been a source for a set of jujube twig amulets in the former's vast collection, as Canaan does note they were from jawrat al-'enab. Today the grove of jujubes is gone, replaced by an Israeli national park.

== Trip to Cairo ==
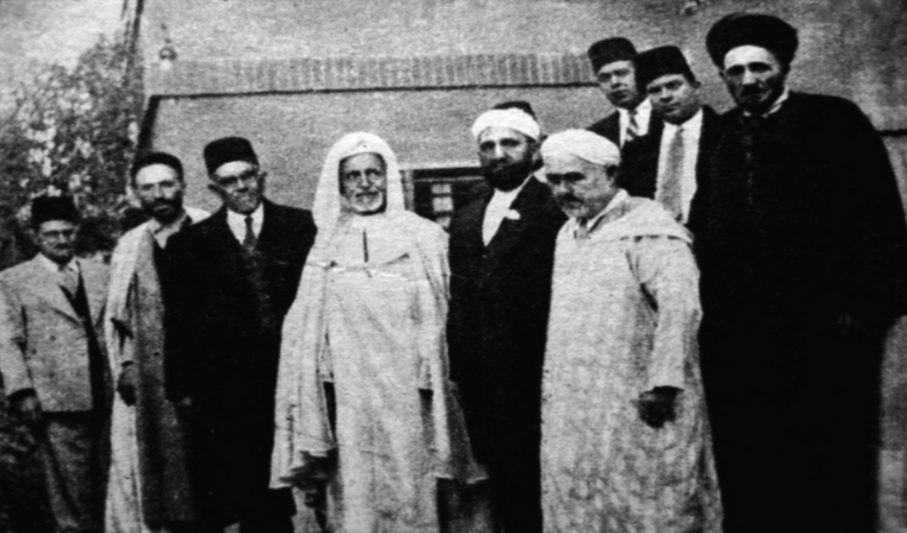
Sayyed Mahmoud al-Askari al-Falaki al-Sharif at far right, beside him wearing white is Abdel Karim al-Khattabi & further to the left also in white Idris of Libya in Cairo in 1948

In February 1948, Sayyed al-Falaki traveled to Cairo and hosted a number of Arab and Islamic dignitaries and elites at a luncheon event, including the Moroccan revolutionary Abdel Karim al-Khattabi & the future king Idris of Libya as well as Afghani and Tunisian dignitaries.

This visit took place during the Nakba that had begun in his native Palestine, and it is the last mention of al-Falaki in available written sources. It is a mystery as to whether he returned to Palestine, remained in Egypt, and when he died or where he was buried.
