= Hebron glass =

Glass produced in Hebron, Palestine

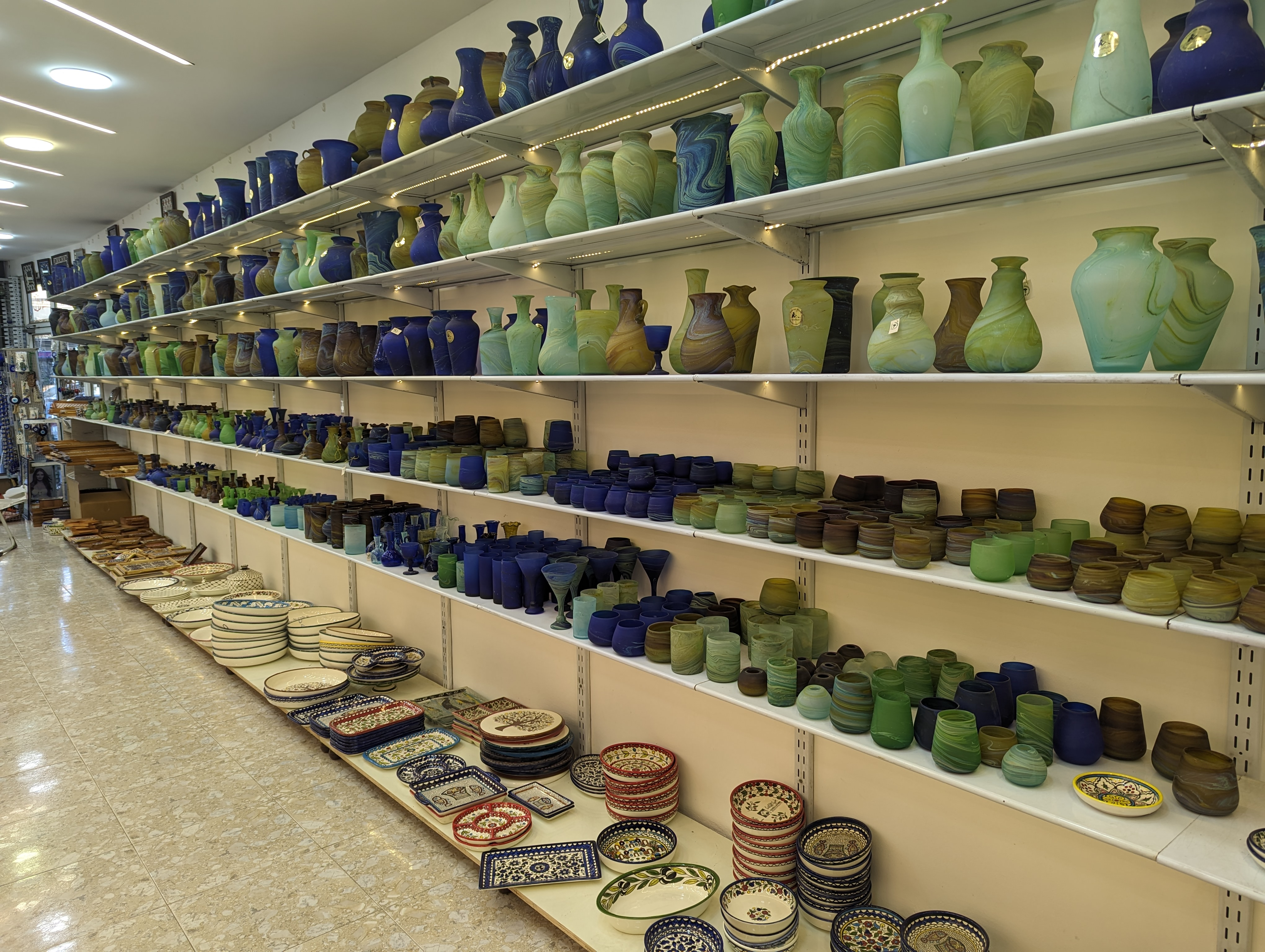
A display of Hebron glass at a shop in Hebron.

Hebron glass (Arabic: زجاج الخليل, zajaj al-Khalili ) is glass made in Hebron, Palestine, where there has been a strong glassmaking tradition since Roman times in Syria Palestina, with its origin going back to the older Phoenician glass industry. The Old City of Hebron still contains a quarter named the "Glass-Blower Quarter" (Arabic: حارة القزازين; Haret Kezazin) and Hebron glass continues to serve as a tourist attraction for the city.

Traditionally, the glass was melted using local raw materials, including sand from neighboring villages, sodium carbonate (from the Dead Sea), and coloring additives such as iron oxide and copper oxide. Nowadays, recycled glass is often used instead. Glass production in Hebron is a family trade and art, the secrets of which have been preserved and passed down by a few Palestinian families who operate the glass factories located just outside the city. The products made include glass jewelry, such as beads, bracelets, and rings, as well as stained glass windows, and glass lamps. However, due to the Palestinian–Israeli conflict and Israel's occupation of the West Bank, glass production has suffered a decline.

== History ==
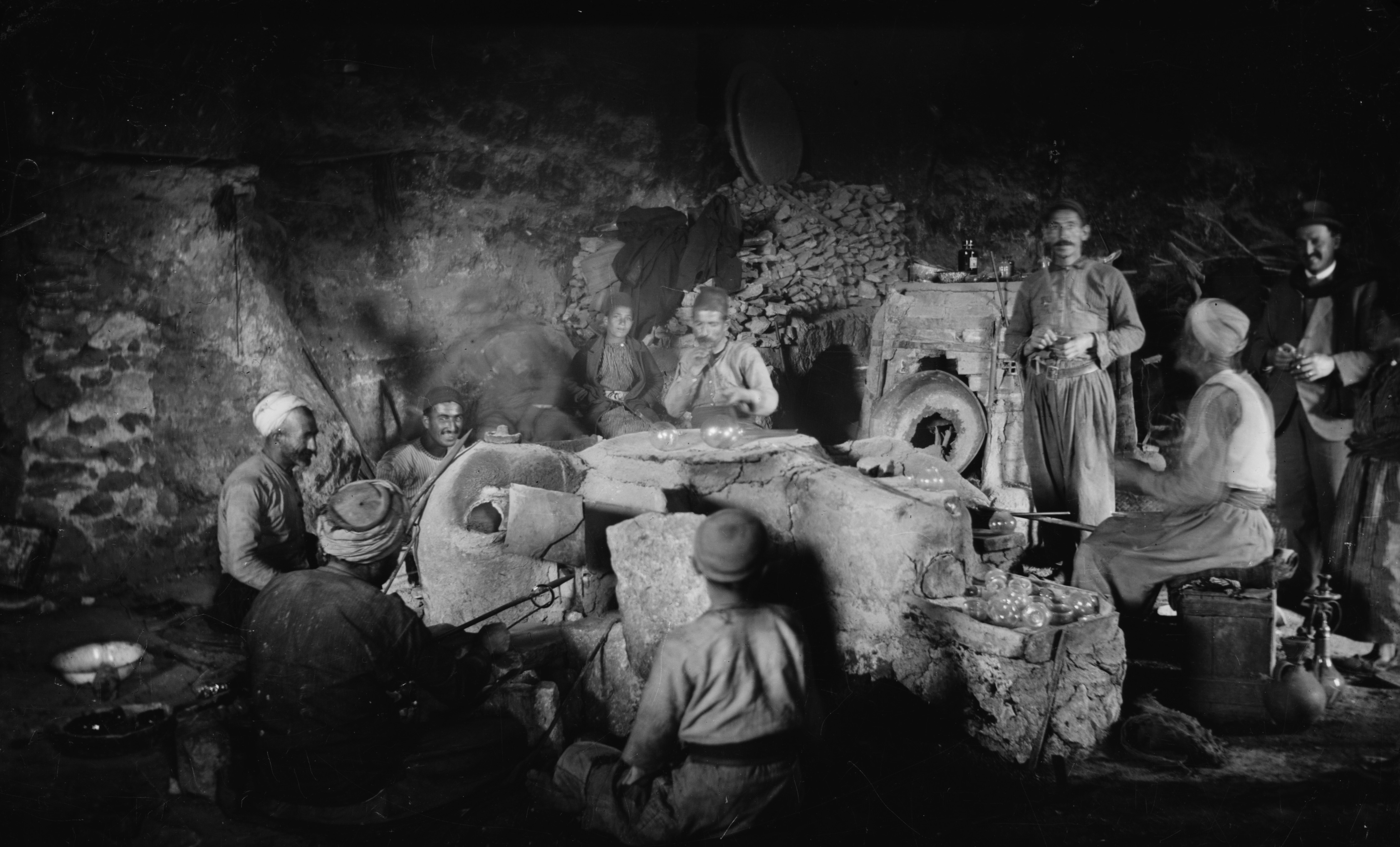
Glass Works, photo taken 1900-1920 by American Colony, Jerusalem.

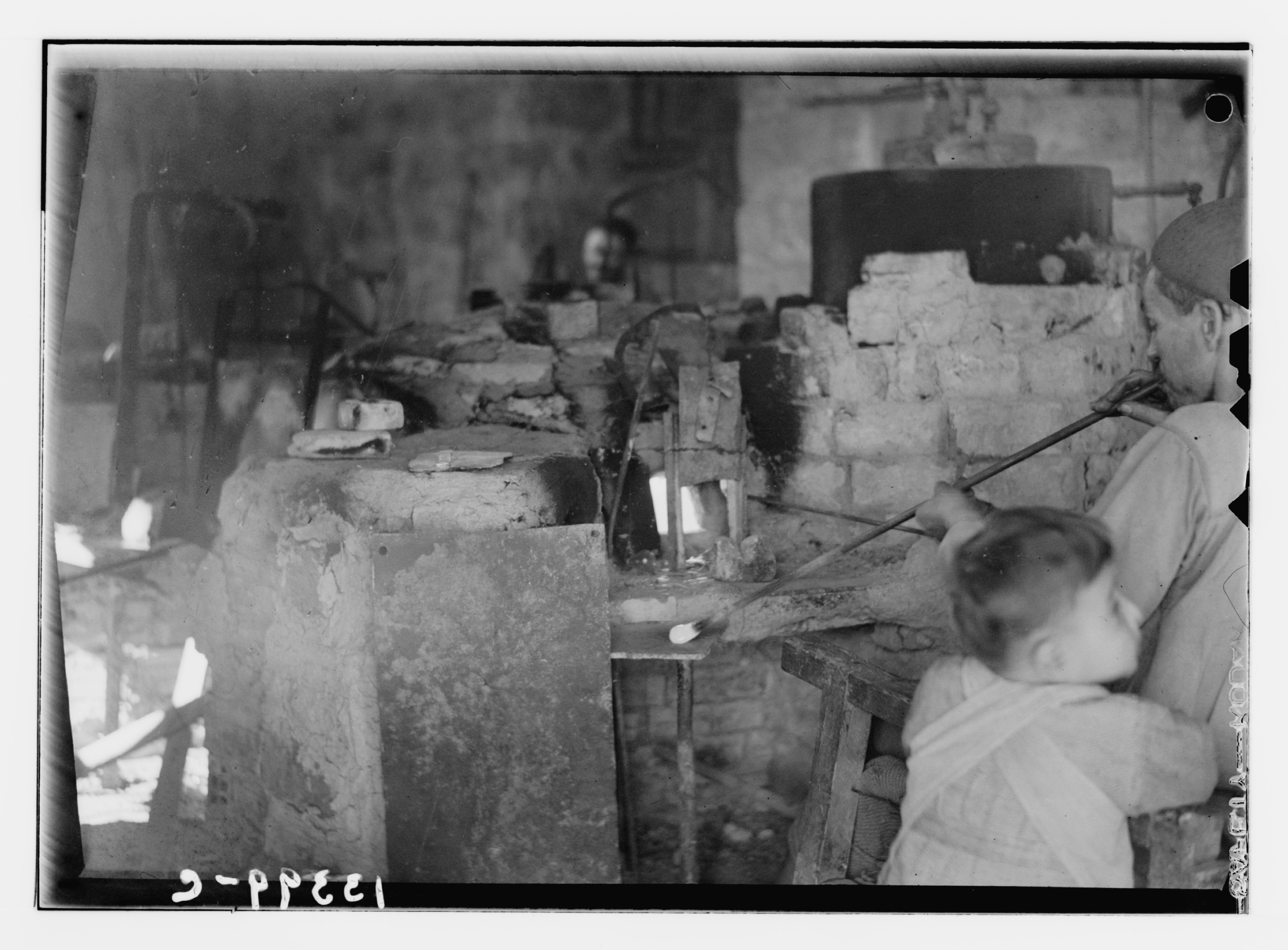
Hebron glass blowing, 9 December 1945

Glass-making has a millennia long history in the region of Palestine. In the Amarna letters, the rulers of city-states in Palestine and Lebanon mention their export of raw glass materials to the Ancient Egyptian pharaohs. Artifacts of the glass industry in Hebron have been dated to period of Roman rule in Syria Palestina . As the ancient Phoenician glass industry shrank from the exposed cities along the eastern Mediterranean coastline, the industry migrated inland, to Hebron in particular. Glass artifacts from Hebron dating to the 1st and 2nd centuries have been found, and are on exhibit as part of the Drake Collection. Stained glass windows made of Hebron glass dating to the 12th century are found in the Ibrahimi Mosque, which served as a church during the Crusader era in Syria Palestina. Another example of stained glass windows produced in Hebron are those adorning the Dome of the Rock in the Old City of Jerusalem.

"Hebron's medieval reputation in glassmaking is corroborated by some of the many Christian pilgrims who visited the city over the centuries. Between 1345 and 1350, Franciscan friar Niccolò da Poggibonsi noted that "they make great works of art in glass." In the late 15th century, the friar Felix Faber and his companions also stopped in this "exceeding ancient city," and he described how "we came forth from our inn, and passed through the long street of the city, in which work-people of divers crafts dwelt, but more particularly workers in glass; for at this place glass is made, not clear glass, but black, and of the colors between dark and light."

While acknowledging that the production of glass in Syria Palestina dates back to Roman period, Nazmi Ju'beh, director of RIWAQ: Centre for Architectural Conservation, contends that the practices of today's glass industry in Hebron most likely emerged in the 13th century CE. This corresponds to what foreigners observed, like Jacques de Vitry who around 1080 mentioned Acre and Tyre, (but not Hebron), as glass-producing cities, while by 1483, when Felix Fabri visited the city, he described passing "through the long street of the city, in which work-people of divers crafts dwelt, but particularly workers in glass; for at this place glass is made, not clear glass, but black, and of the colors between dark and light."

Ju'beh notes that an alternate theory assigns today's techniques to the Venetian glass tradition and that still other researchers claim they were already extant at the time of the Crusades and were carried back to Europe from Hebron, possibly originating in Syria.

Glass produced by these factories were typically functional items including drinking and eating vessels, as well as olive oil and later petrol-based lamps, although the factories also produced jewelry and accessories. Bedouins of the Negev, the Arabian Desert, and Sinai were the primary purchasers of jewelry, but large exports of expensive Hebron glass items were sent by guarded camel caravans to Egypt, Syria, and the Transjordan. Marketing communities of Hebron glass were established in al-Karak (Crac) in southern Jordan and Cairo in Egypt by the 16th century.

The glass industry was a principal employer and a generator of wealth for its owners. Well known for glass production throughout the Arab world, Western travelers to Ottoman Palestine in the 18th and 19th century provided descriptions of the Hebron glass industry as well. For example, Volney in the 1780s, wrote that: "They make there great quantity of colored rings, bracelets for the wrists and legs, and for the arm above the elbows, besides a variety of other trinkets, which are sent even to Constantinople." Ulrich Jasper Seetzen noted during his travels in Ottoman Palestine in 1807–1809 that 150 persons were employed in the glass industry in Hebron, while C.J. Irby and J. Mangles visited a glass lamp factory in Hebron in 1818, and were told the lamps were exported to Egypt.

Later in the century, the production declined due to competition from imported European glass-ware. However, the products of Hebron continued to be sold, particularly among the poorer populace, particularly by travelling Jewish traders from the city. At the World Fair of 1873 in Vienna, Hebron was represented with glass ornaments. A report from the French consul in 1886 suggests that glass-making remained an important source of income for Hebron with four factories making 60,000 francs per annum.

The tradition of glassblowing continues in the 21st century in three factories located outside of the traditional quarter of the Old City, north of Hebron and south of the neighboring town of Halhul which generally produce functional household souvenirs. Two of the factories are owned by the Natsheh family. These are displayed in large halls close to each of the factories.

Hebron glass is an attraction for both domestic and foreign tourists. Today, however, due to ongoing export problems, the decline in tourism, and restrictions on Palestinian freedom of movement in the aftermath of the Second Intifada, industry production has suffered. According to Nazmi al-Ju'bah, the director of RIWAQ: Centre for Architectural Conservation, under these circumstances, the survival of the Hebron glass industry is in question.

== Production ==
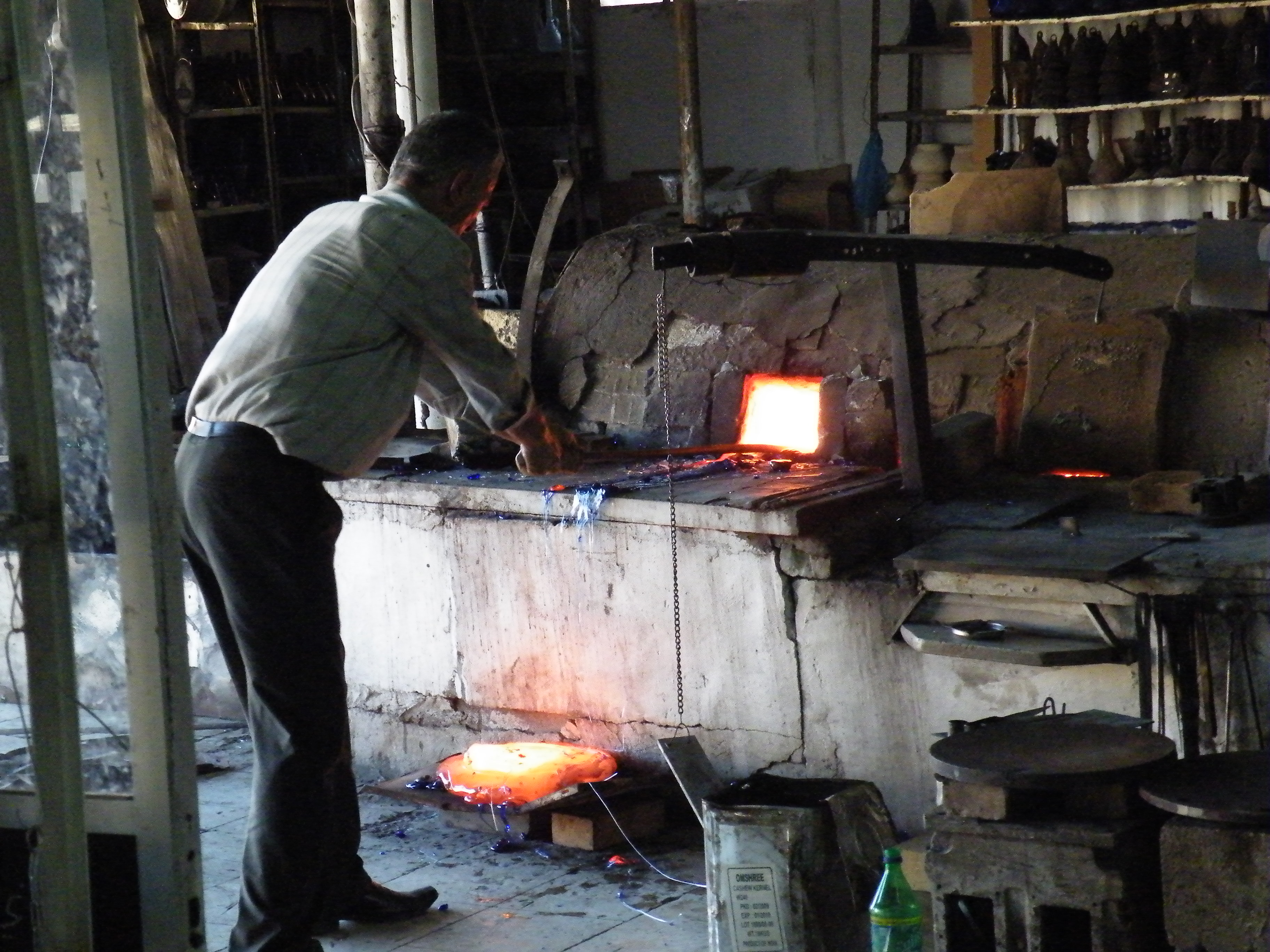
Carefully moving molten glass as part of the modern production process

Hebron glass was traditionally produced using sand from the village of Bani Na'im, east of Hebron, and soda-rich sodium carbonate plant-ash from salt-resistant (halophytic) plants around the Dead Sea, approximately 35 miles away (Seetzen, 1859: 49). Instead of sand, recycled glass is the primary raw material used to make Hebron glass today.

In the 19th hundred, it was reported that Arabs cut and burned Salicornia fruticosa (syn. Arthrocnemium fruticosum), growing by the Dead Sea, and afterwards sold the ashes to the glass-makes of Hebron.

The precise production process is a trade secret maintained by the few Palestinian families who run the factories which continue to produce Hebron glass today, passed through generations by apprenticing children. As one master of the craft said, "You can learn to play the 'oud at any age, but unless you begin [glasswork] as a child, you will never become a master..."

According to the Holy Land Handicraft Cooperative Society, the blowing technique employed is the same as was used by the ancient Phoenicians, though archaeologists and historians of glass agree that glassblowing was not common until the last few centuries BCE. Molten glass is withdrawn from a furnace on the end of an iron pipe, which is blown into as a metal tool called a kammasha is used to shape the glass. It is returned to the furnace and reshaped by the same process before being detached from the pipe and placed into a cooling chamber.

== Jewelry ==
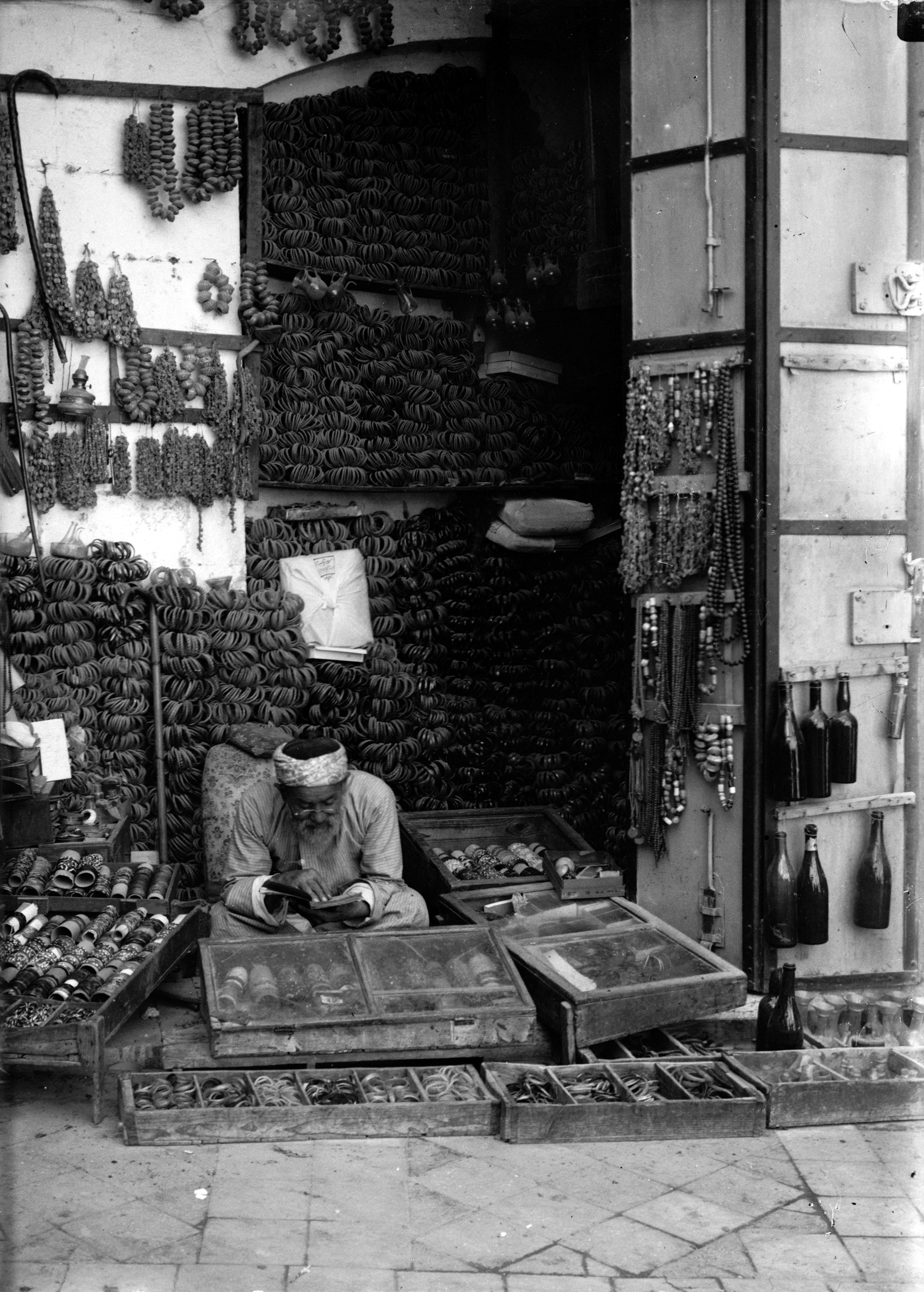
Evil eye beads and Hebron glass bracelets, Jerusalem 1900-1920.

Glass beads for jewelry have traditionally been made in Hebron. Blue beads and glass beads with 'eyes' (owayneh) were made for use as amulets since they were considered particularly effective against the evil-eye. In the Museum of Mankind collections, there exist several glass necklaces that were made in Hebron during the Mandate period or earlier. Besides necklaces made of blue and green beads, and 'eyes' beads, there are examples of beads of small hands, also called a Hamsa. Most of a woman's jewellery was given to her at marriage; in the early 1920s, in Bayt Dajan, a glass bracelet (ghwayshat) made in Hebron would be considered a necessary part of the jewellery of a bride's trousseau.

=== Hebron trade beads ===
In 1799, English traveler William George Browne mentioned the production of "Coarse glass beads...called Hersh and Munjir" in Palestine; The "Munjir" (Mongur) were large beads, while the Hersh (Harish) were smaller. These Hebron glass beads were used for trade, and export primarily to Africa from the early to mid-19th century. Spread throughout West Africa, in Kano, Nigeria, they were grounded on the edges to make round beads fit together on a strand more suitably. There, they picked up the name "Kano Beads", although they were not originally produced in Kano. By the 1930s, their value had decreased; in 1937, A. J. Arkell recorded the beads being sold "for a song" by Sudanese women to Hausa traders in Dafur.

== See also ==
- Glass art
- Mother-of-pearl carving in Bethlehem
- Nabulsi soap
- Palestinian handicrafts
- Roman glass

== Bibliography ==
- Arkell, A.J. (1937). "Hebron beads in Dafur". Sudan Notes and Records. 40 (2): 300–305. JSTOR 41716267.
- Beard, J.R. (1862). The people's dictionary of the Bible. Vol. 2. Oxford University.
- Browne, W.G. (1799). Travels in Africa, Egypt and Syria From the year 1792 to 1798. T. Cadell junior and W. Davies, Strand.
- Delpuget, David (1866). Les Juifs d´Alexandrie, de Jaffa et de Jérusalem en 1865. Bordeaux.
- Comay, Joan (2001). Who's who in the Old Testament. Routledge. ISBN 0-415-26031-0.
- Fabri, F. (1893). Felix Fabri (circa 1480–1483 A.D.) vol II, part II. Palestine Pilgrims' Text Society.
- Gumppenberg, Stephan von (1561). Wahrhaftige Beschreibung der Meerfahrt. Rab und Han.
- Irby, C.L.; Mangles, J. (1823). Travels in Egypt and Nubia, Syria, and Asia Minor; during the years 1817 & 1818. London: Printed for Private Distribution by T. White & Co.
- Loret, L. (1884). La Syrie d'aujourd'hui. Hachette.
- Perrot, G.; Chipiez, C.; Armstrong, W. (1885). History of Art in Phœnicia and Its Dependencies. Chapman and Hall.
- Robinson, E.; Smith, E. (1841). Biblical Researches in Palestine, Mount Sinai and Arabia Petraea: A Journal of Travels in the year 1838. Vol. 2. Boston: Crocker & Brewster. (p. 441)
- Schölch, A. (1993). Palestine in Transformation, 1856-1882 (PDF). Institute for Palestine Studies. ISBN 0-88728-234-2.
- Sears, Robert (1849). A New and Complete History of the Holy Bible as Contained in the Old and New Testaments. Harvard University Press.
- Seetzen, U.J. (1855). Ulrich Jasper Seetzen's Reisen durch Syrien, Palästina, Phönicien, die Transjordan-länder, Arabia Petraea und Unter-Aegypten (in German). Vol. 3. Berlin: G. Reimer.
- Spaulding, Mary; Welch, Penny (1994). Nurturing Yesterday's Child: A Portrayal of the Drake Collection of Paedeatric History. Dundurn Press Ltd. ISBN 0-920474-91-8.
- Thompson, W.M. (1861). The Land and the Book: Or, Biblical Illustrations Drawn from the Manners and Customs, the Scenes and Scenery of the Holy Land. Harper & Bros.
- Tunisi, or el-Tounsy (1845). Voyage au Darfour. Paris. (pp. 41n, 209)
- Vitry, J. de (1896). History of Jerusalem, A.D. 1180. Paris.
- Volney, C.-F. (1788). Travels Through Syria and Egypt, in the Years 1783, 1784, and 1785: containing the Present Natural and Political State of Those Countries, Their Productions, Arts, Manufactures, and Commerce : with Observations on the Manners, Customs, and Government of the Turks and Arabs : Illustrated. Vol. 2.
- Weir, Shelagh (1989). Palestinian Costume. British Museum Publications Ltd. ISBN 0-7141-2517-2.
