= List of Pakistani qaris =

This is a list of Pakistani radio and television qaris. The "Late" after a name indicates that that person is deceased.

== A ==
- Abdullah Bukhari

== G ==
- Ghulam Rasool

== K ==
- Khursheed Ahmad

== R ==
- Rubina Khalid

== S ==
- Shakir Qasmi
- Syed Sadaqat Ali

== J ==
- Junaid Jamshed

== Y ==
- Muhammad Yahya Rasool Nagari

== Z ==
- Zahir Qasmi
