= Qāriʾ =

Person who recites the Qur'an with the proper rules of recitation

A qāriʾ (Arabic: قَارِئ, Arabic pronunciation: [qaːriʔ], plural قُرَّاء qurrāʾ) is a person who recites the Quran with the proper rules of recitation (tajwid). While in modern times the term refers primarily to professional reciters, historically the qurrāʾ represented an elite class of scholars and early Muslim settlers who played a pivotal role in the administration and political history of the early Rashidun Caliphate.

Although it is encouraged, a qāriʾ does not necessarily have to memorize the Quran, just to recite it according to the rules of tajwid with melodious sound.

Ibn al-Jazari (1350–1429) is considered one of the most prominent scholars in the science of Quran recitation. He was a leading authority who systematized and documented the ten canonical recitations. Earlier, Abu Bakr Ibn Mujāhid (d. 936) had formalized the system of seven readings. Both scholars contributed to the preservation and transmission of Quran recitation through established chains of oral transmission tracing back to the Prophet Muhammad.

The quadrumvirate of Al-Minshawi, Abdul Basit, Al-Hussary, and Mustafa Ismail are generally regarded as prominent Egyptian Quran reciters of modern times who have an outsized impact on the Islamic world.

== Notable Quran reciters ==
=== Early Islamic period (7th century) ===
- Abu Musa al-Ash'ari – A number of traditions praise his Quran recitation, and is associated with one of the early versions of Mushaf compilation.
- Abd Allah ibn Mas'ud – Named among the four companions from whom the Prophet Muhammad instructed Muslims to learn Quranic recitation.
- Muadh ibn Jabal – Named among the four companions from whom the Prophet Muhammad instructed Muslims to learn Quranic recitation.
- Ubayy ibn Ka'b – Described in Islamic tradition as one of the foremost Quran reciters among the Companions.
- Abu al-Darda – Quran instructor during the time of Muhammad.
- Zayd ibn Thabit – Quran reciter, leading authority and collator during the compilation of Quran in Uthman's caliphate.
- Salim ibn Ma'qil – Freed slave of Abu Hudhayfa ibn Utba, named among the four companions from whom the Prophet Muhammad instructed Muslims to learn Quranic recitation.
- Malik al-Ashtar – Leader of the Kufan qurrāʾ, and the opposition to Caliph Uthman.
- Kumayl ibn Ziyad – A prominent Kufan and associate of Ali, noted for his piety and political role.
- Hurqus ibn Zuhayr as-Sa'di – A veteran leader of the qurrāʾ and a founding figure of the Muhakkima.
- Zayd ibn Suhan – A prominent Kufan qāriʾ and orator who was a staunch supporter of Ali until his death at the Battle of the Camel.
- Abd Allah ibn Hanzala – Leader of the Medinan qurrāʾ during the Battle of al-Harra.
- Abd Allah ibn Habib al-Sulami

=== Seven canonical reciters and transmitters ===
1. Ibn Amir ad-Dimashqi (d. 736)
  - Hisham bin Amar
  - Ibn Dhakwan
2. Ibn Kathir al-Makki (665–737)
  - Al-Bazzi (786–846)
  - Qunbul (808–904)
3. Aasim ibn Abi al-Najud (d. 745)
  - Hafs (706–796)
  - Abu Bakr ibn Ayyash (713–809)
4. Abu Amr al-Basri (690–771)
  - Al-Duri (767–860)
  - al-Soussi (790–874)
5. Hamzah az-Zaiyyat (d. 772)
  - Khalaf al-Bazzar (767–844)
  - Khallad (d. 835)
6. Nafiʽ al-Madani (689–785)
  - Warsh (728–812)
  - Qalun (738–835)
7. Al-Kisa'i (d. 804)
  - Al-Duri (767–860)
  - Al-Laythi (d. 854)

=== 8th–18th century ===
- Abu Ja'far al-Madani (d. 748)
- Aban ibn Taghlib (d. 758)
- Sulayman al-Aʽmash (d. 765)
- Yahya ibn Adam (757–818)
- Abu Ubaid al-Qasim bin Salam (770–838)
- Abu Bakr al-Isfahani (d. 908)
- Makki ibn Abi Talib al-Qaysi (960–1045)
- Al-Dani (981–1053)
- Muhammad ibn Tayfour Sajawandi (d. 1165)
- Abu al-Qasim al-Shatibi (1144–1194)
- Abu Hayyan al-Gharnati (1256–1344)
- Ibn Juzayy (1292–1340)
- Ibn al-Jazari (1350–1429)
- Sati-un-Nissa (1580–1647)

=== Contemporary and modern reciters ===
==== Bangladesh ====
- Muhammad Ibrahim Ujani (1863–1943)
- Abdul Latif Chowdhury Fultali (1913–2008)
- Saleh Ahmad Takrim (b. 2008)
- Muhammad Tariqul Islam (b. 2004)

==== Egypt ====
Ali Mahmud

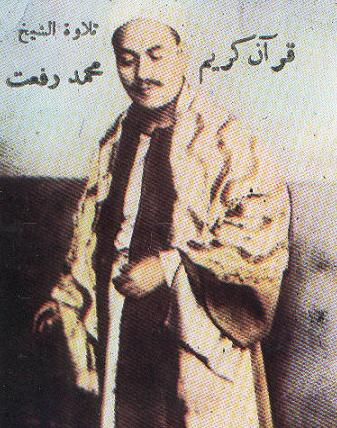
Rifat

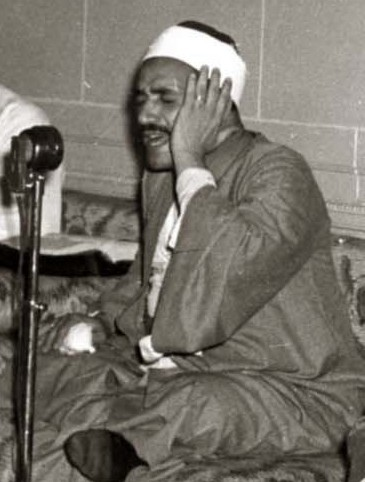
el-Fashni

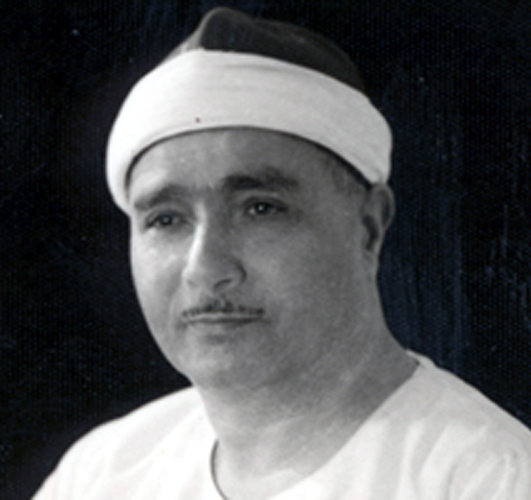
Mustafa Ismail

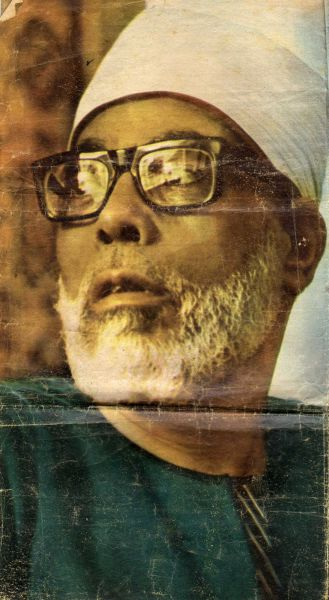
al-Husary

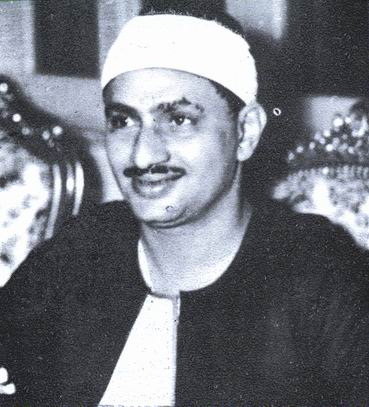
al-Minshawi

al-Bahtimi

Abdul Basit

al-Banna

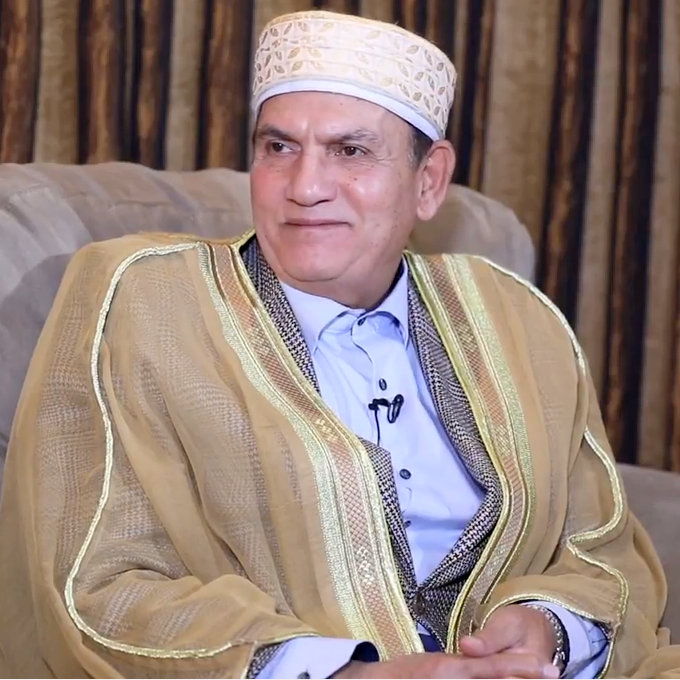
Ahmad Nuaina

- Ali Mahmud (1878–1946)
- Muhammad Rifat (1882–1950)
- Siddiq al-Sayed al-Minshawi (1895–1984)
- Mohamed Salamah (1899–1982)
- Taha el-Fashni (1900–1971)
- Mustafa Ismail (1905–1978)
- Mahmoud Khalil Al-Hussary (1917–1980)
- Sayed El Naqshabandy (1920–1976)
- Muhammad Siddiq Al-Minshawi (1920–1969)
- Nasr El-Din Tobar (1920–1986)
- Kamil Yusuf Al-Bahtimi (1922–1969)
- Abul Ainain Shuaisha (1922–2011)
- Mahmud Ali al-Banna (1926–1985)
- Ali As-Suwaisy (1926–2002)
- Abdul Basit 'Abd us-Samad (1927–1988)
- Mohamed Mahmoud al-Tablawi (1934–2020)
- Shahat Muhammad Anwar (1950–2008)
- Ahmad Nuaina (b. 1954)
- Muhammad Jibril (b. 1964)
- Mahmoud Shahat Anwar (b. 1984)

==== India ====
- Abul Hasan Azami (b. 1941)
- Husain Burhanuddin (b. 1977)

==== Indonesia ====
- Muammar Z.A. (b. 1954)
- Maria Ulfah (b. 1955)
- Mu'min Ainul Mubarak (b. 1971)
- Ali Jaber (1976–2021)
- Veve Zulfikar (b. 2003)

==== Iran ====
- Saeed Toosi (b. 1970)
- Hamed Shakernejad (b. 1983)

==== Kuwait ====
- Mishary Rashid Alafasy (b. 1976)

==== Lebanon ====
- Mahmoud Ahmad El Akkawi (b. 1971)

==== Nigeria ====
- Ahmad Sulaiman Ibrahim (b. 1966)

==== Oman ====
- Hazza Al Balushi (b. 1995)

==== Pakistan ====
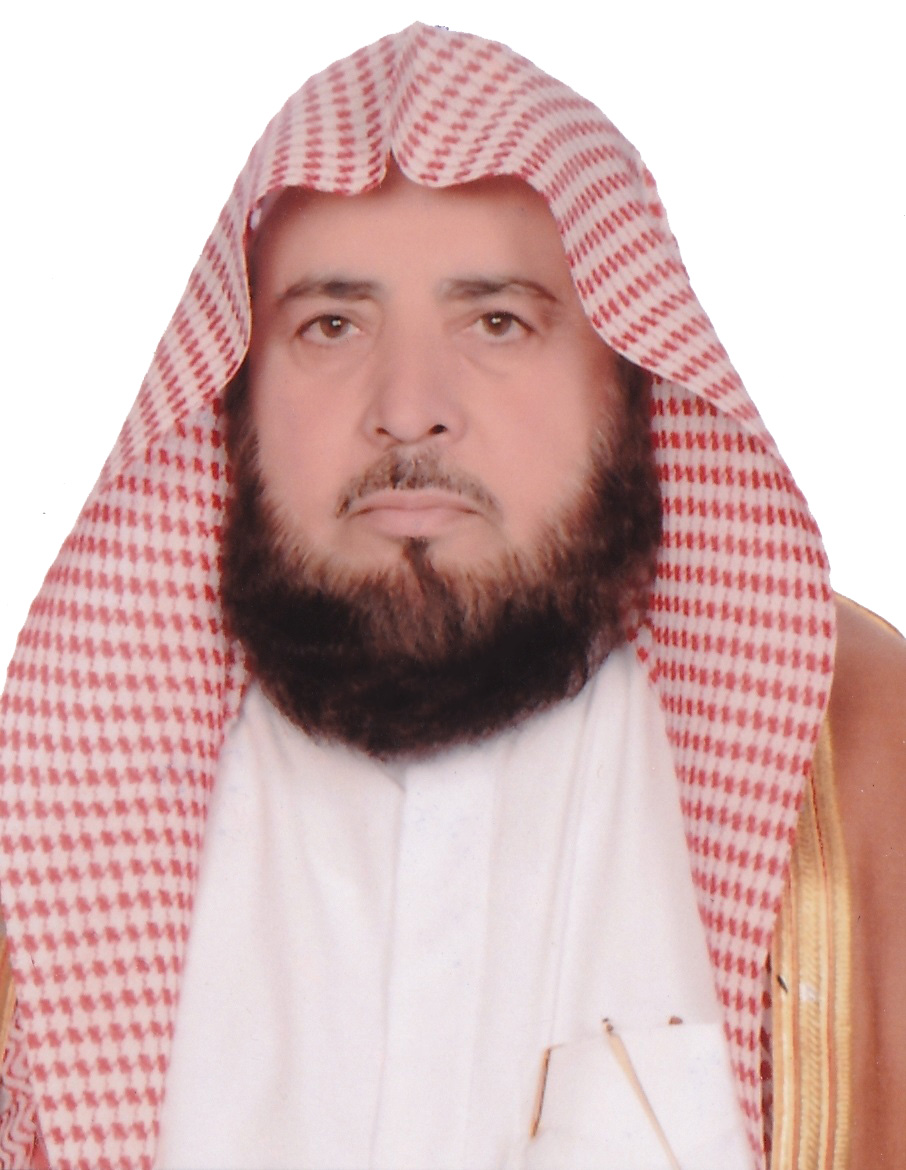
Khalil al-Qari

- Zahir Qasmi (1922–1988)
- Ghulam Rasool (1935–2014)
- Khalil Al-Qari (1939–2018)
- Shakir Qasmi (1943–2023)
- Yahya Rasool Nagari (d. 2020)
- Rubina Khalid (1959–2017)
- Hassan Ali Kasi (b. 1999)
- Syed Sadaqat Ali

==== Palestine ====
- Muhammad Rashad al-Sharif (1925–2016)

==== Saudi Arabia ====
al-Hudhayfi

Muhammad Ayyub

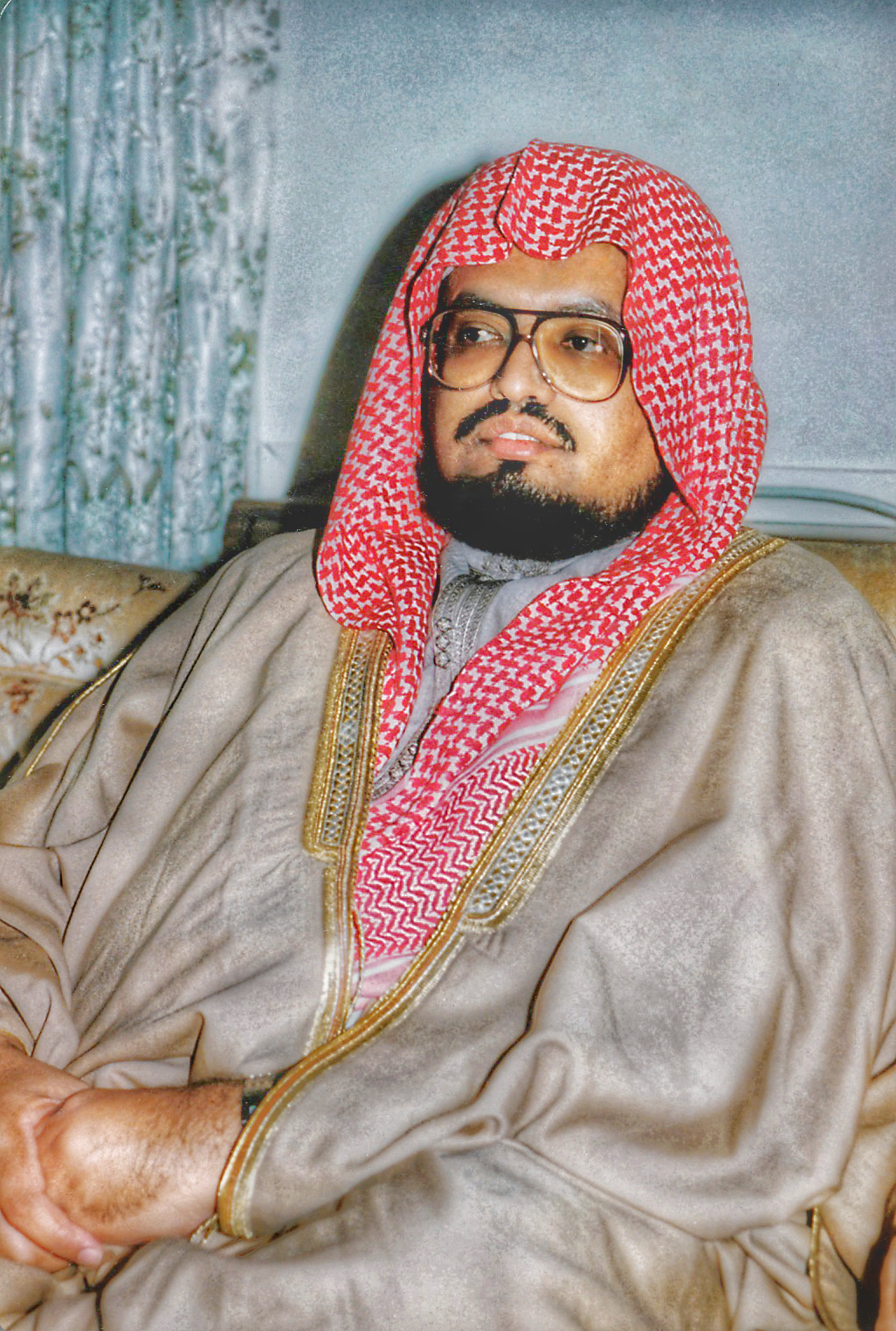
Ali Jaber

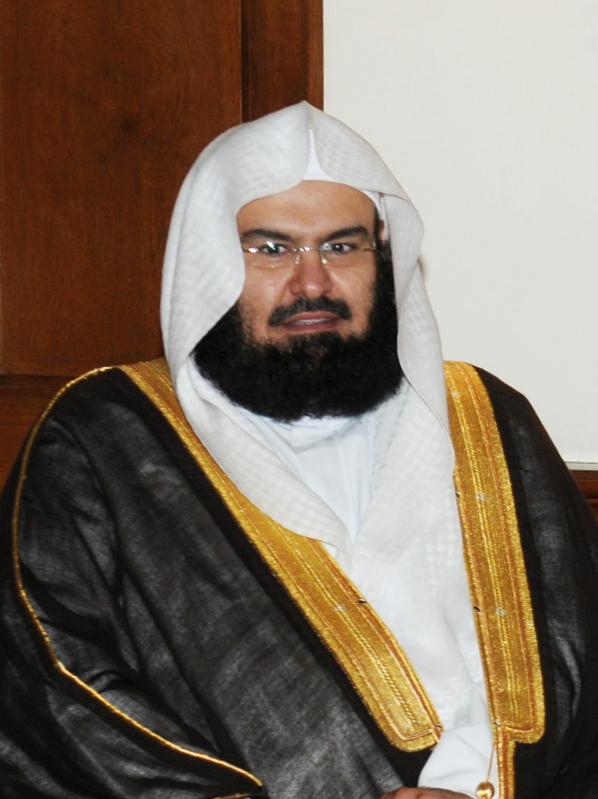
al-Sudais

al-Shuraim

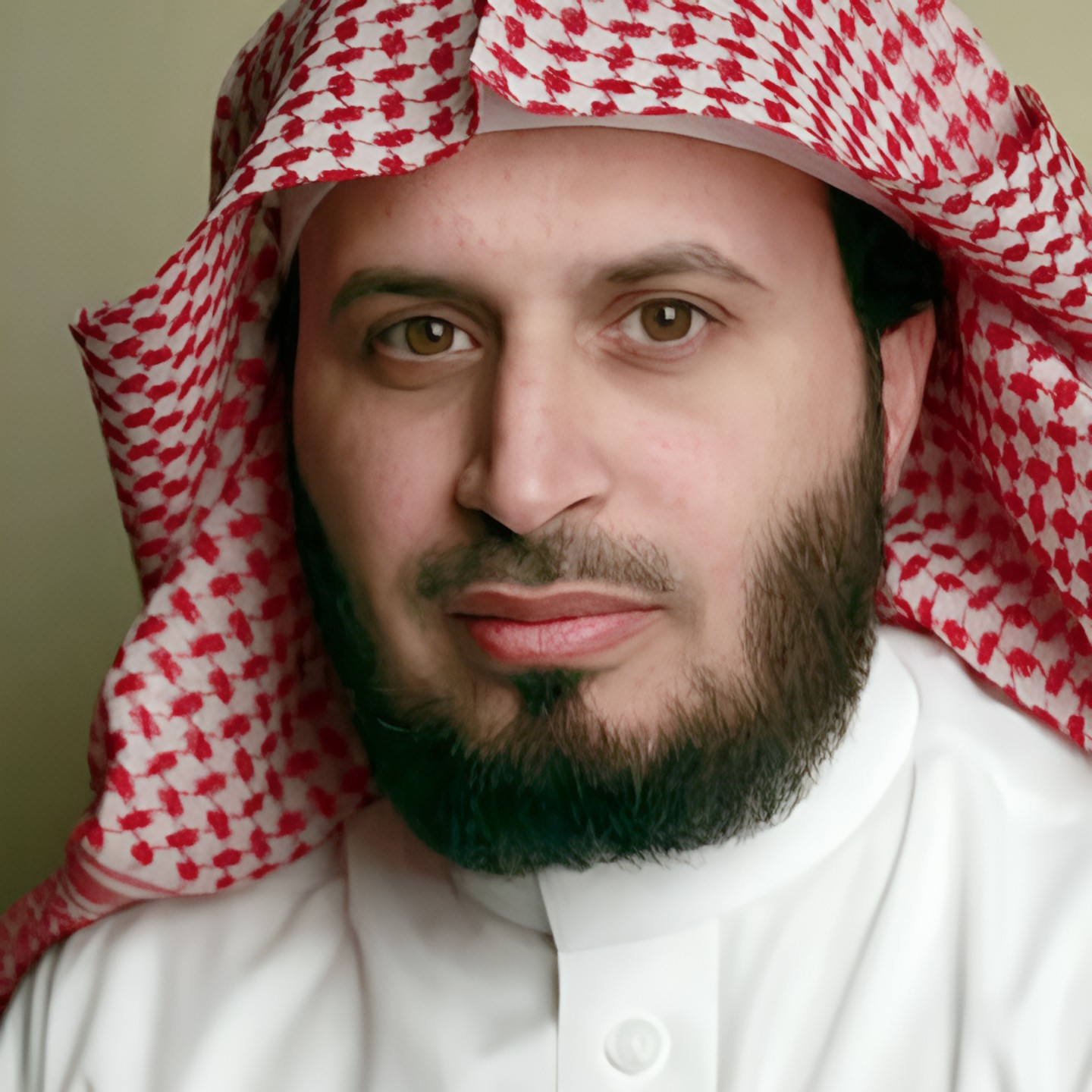
al-Ghamdi

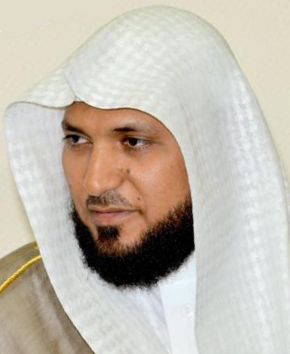
al-Mu'aiqly

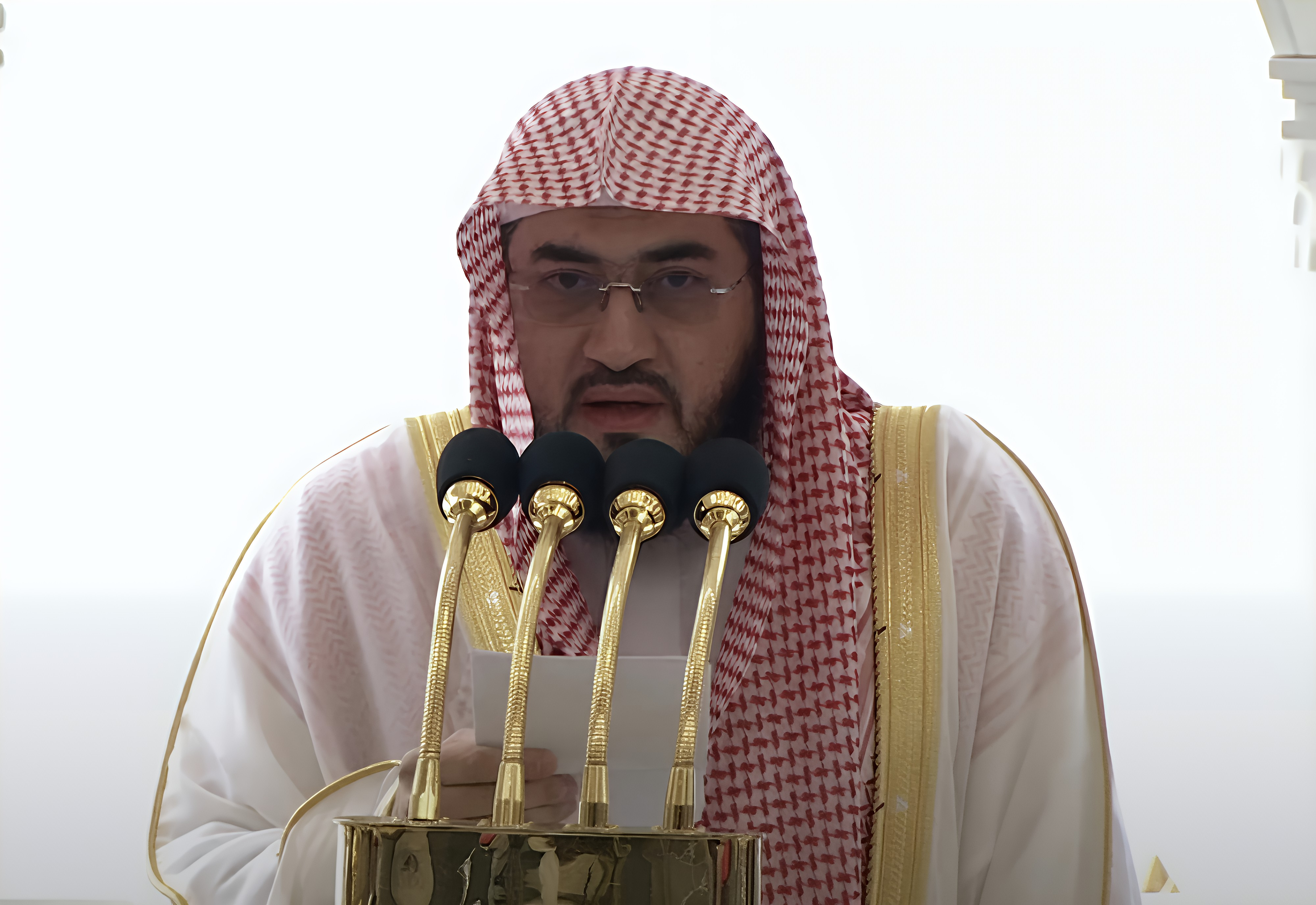
Bandar Baleela

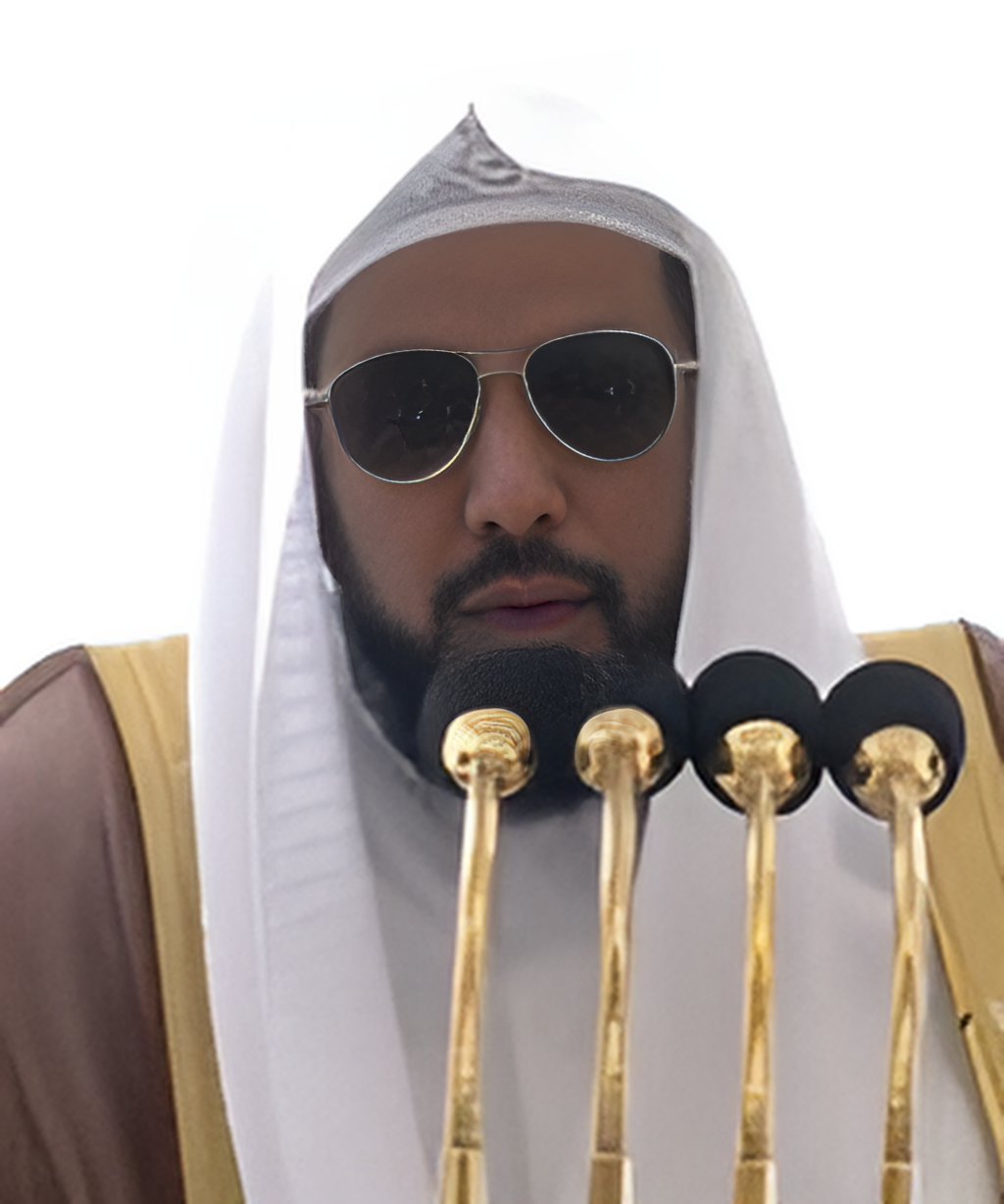
al-Juhany

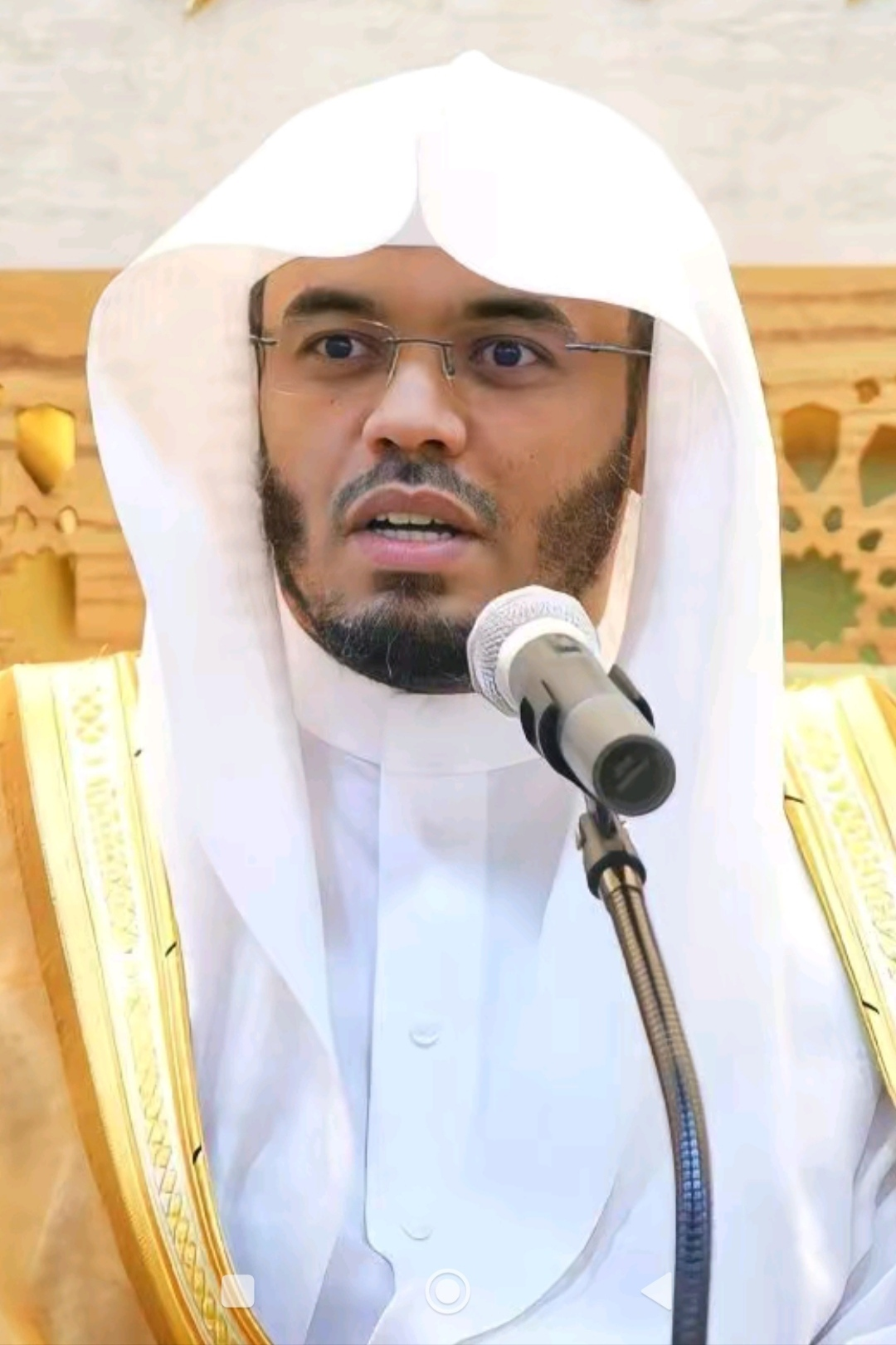
al-Dawsari

- Abd Allah ibn Humayd (1911–1982)
- Mohammad Al Subail (1924–2012)
- Abu Abd al-Rahman Ibn Aqil al-Zahiri (b. 1938)
- Ali al-Hudhaify (b. 1947)
- Muhammad Ayyub (1952–2016)
- Ali Abdullah Jaber (1954–2005)
- Adil al-Kalbani (b. 1959)
- Abdulbari ath-Thubaity (b. 1960)
- Abdul-Rahman Al-Sudais (b. 1963)
- Abdullah Matroud (b. 1963)
- Saud Al-Shuraim (b. 1966)
- Saad al Ghamdi (b. 1967)
- Abdulmohsen Al-Qasim (b. 1967)
- Ahmad bin Ali Al-Ajmi (b. 1968)
- Maher al-Mu'aiqly (b. 1969)
- Mahmoud Khalil al-Qari (1970–2022)
- Abu Bakr Ash Shatry (b. 1970)
- Salah Ba'uthman
- Salah Al Budair (b. 1970)
- Saleh Al-Talib (b. 1974)
- Bandar Baleela (b. 1975)
- Abdullah Awad Al Juhany (b. 1976)
- Yasir al-Dawsari (b. 1980)
- Ahmad Talib Hameed (b. 1981)

==== Somalia ====
- Abdul Rachid Soufi (b. 1962)

==== Sudan ====
- Noreen Muhammad Siddiq (1982–2020)
