= Maher al-Mu'aiqly =

Imam of Masjid-al-Haraam

Imam of Masjid al-Haram Maher Al-Mu'aiqly
- ماهر المعيقلي
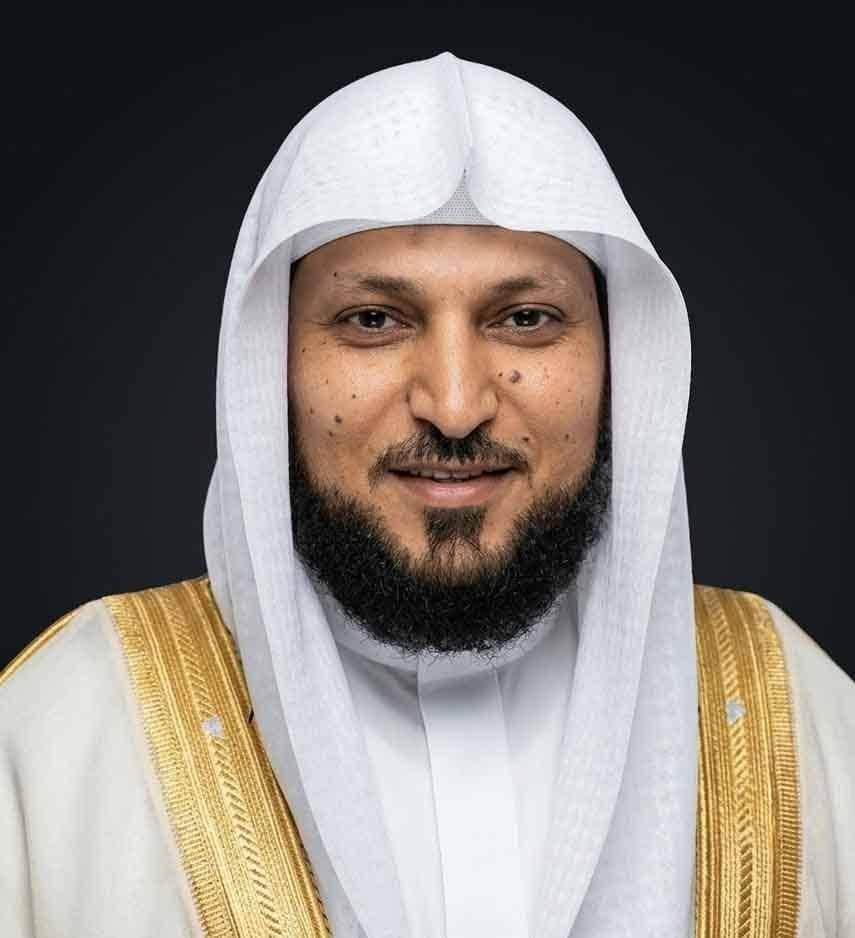

Imam of Masjid al-Haram
- Incumbent
- Assumed office 9 August 2007
- Appointed by: Custodian of the Two Holy Mosques

Personal life
- Born: 7 January 1969 (age 57) Medina, Saudi Arabia
- Education: King Saud University; Umm al-Qura University (PhD); Promoted to full professor in Islamic jurisprudence at Umm al-Qura University
- Occupation: Imam, Khatib, Professor

Religious life
- Religion: Islam
- Jurisprudence: Hanbali
- Maher al-Muaiqaly's voice Surat al-Fatiha Recited by Maher al-Muaiqaly

Maher ibn Hamad ibn Muaiqel al-Muaiqly al-Balawi (Arabic: ماهر بن حمد بن معيقل المعيقلي البلوي; born 7 January 1969) is an imam and preacher of the Grand Mosque of Mecca, Masjid al-Haram. In 2024, he delivered the Hajj sermon to a multitude of pilgrims gathered at Mount Arafat after prayers.

== Education ==
Maher al-Mu'aiqali leading prayer in the Sultan Salahuddin Abdul Aziz Mosque

Al-Muaiqly graduated from the Teachers College in Medina where he studied mathematics and moved to work in Makkah al-Mukarramah as a teacher. He then became a student guide at Prince Abdul Majeed School in Mecca. He holds a master's degree in 1425 AH in the jurisprudence of Imam Ahmad bin Hanbal at the College of Shari'a at Umm al-Qura University and obtained a doctorate in interpretation. He works as an assistant professor in the Judicial Studies Department at the College of Judicial Studies and Regulations at Umm al-Qura University, and holds the position of Vice Dean for Graduate Studies and Scientific Research.

The thesis was entitled Imam Ahmad ibn Hanbal Jurisprudence Issues according to the narration of Abd al-Malik al-Maimouni (collection and study). He obtained his doctorate from Umm al-Qura University in the 1432 AH, which is the research of the book (Tuhfat al-Nabih, Sharh al-Tanbih) on Borders and Districts (by Imam Shirazi in Shafi’i jurisprudence).

He also obtained a doctorate thesis entitled The Prophet's Masterpiece in Explanation of the Warning to al-Zanklouni al-Shafi'i, a Study and research of the Chapter on Borders and the Judiciary. The thesis was discussed in the King Abdul Aziz Hall. He obtained his doctorate in jurisprudence on 28 Muharram 1434, the Hijri equivalent to 12 December 2012 Gregorian.

He was subsequently promoted to the rank of professor in Islamic jurisprudence at Umm al-Qura University.

== Imam of Grand Mosque ==
He led the sermon of al-Saadi Mosque in al-Awali district in Mecca Province. He assumed the leadership of the prayer at the Prophet's Mosque during the month of Ramadan in 1426 AH and 1427 AH. And he led the Tarawih and Tahajjud prayers at the Grand Mosque during the month of Ramadan in 1428 AH, and he was appointed as an official Imam of the Grand Mosque in that year to date.

== See also ==
- Umm al-Qura University
- Abdul-Rahman Al-Sudais
- Saud al-Shuraim
- Saad al-Ghamdi
- Abdullah Awad al-Juhany
- Bandar Baleela
- Yasir al-Dawsari
