= Saad al Ghamdi =

Saudi Arabian Imam and Qari

Sa'ad al-Ghāmidī
- سعد الغامدي
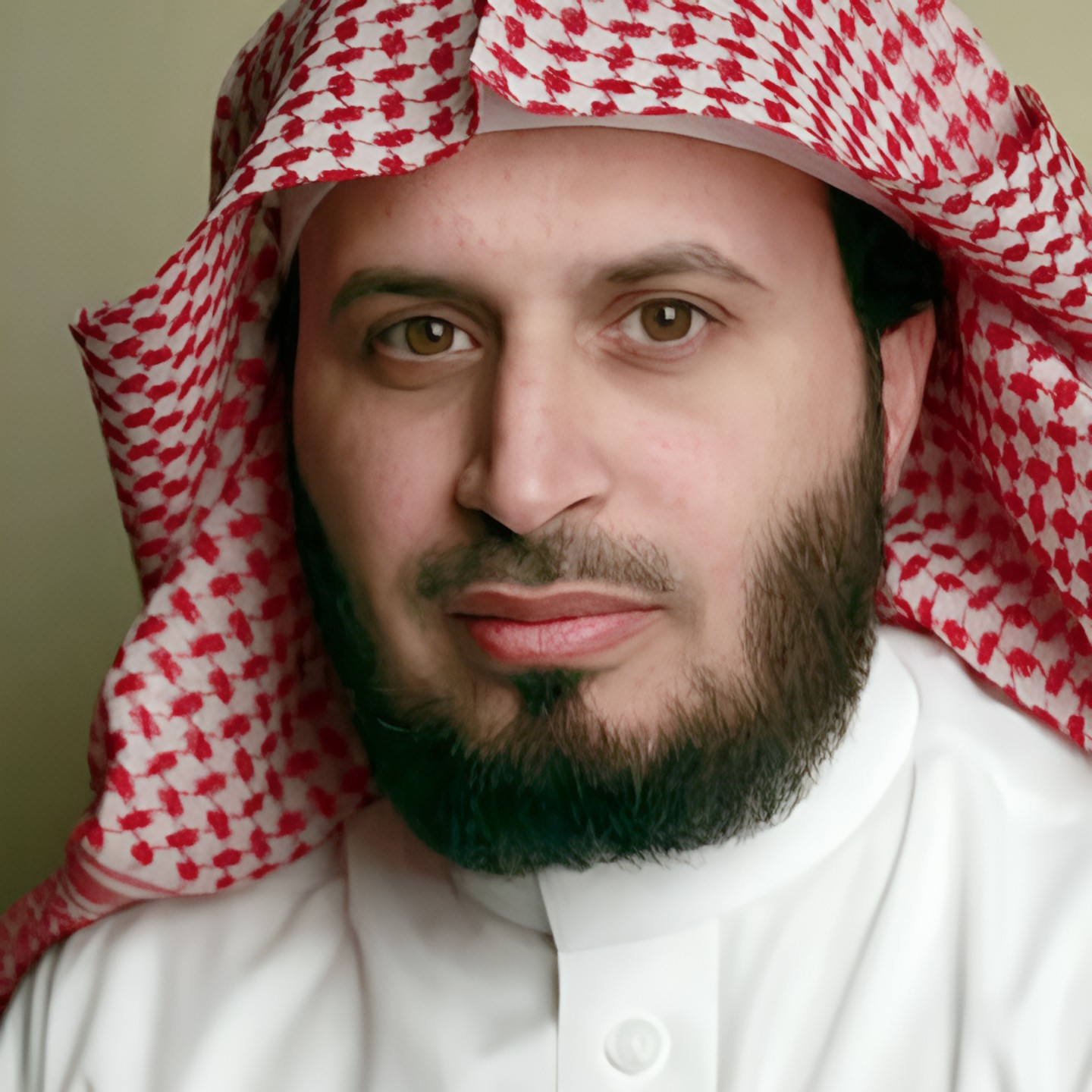

Personal life
- Born: May 19, 1967 (age 59) Dammam, Saudi Arabia
- Occupation: Qari; imam; Khatib

Religious life
- Religion: Islam
- Jurisprudence: Hanbali, Salafi
- Saad Al-Ghamdi reciting Surah Fatiha

Sa'ad al-Ghāmidī (Arabic: سعد الغامدي) is a Qāriʾ and a guest imam of the holy mosque Masjid an-Nabawi. Shaykh Sa'ad al-Ghamdi has served as imam to Islamic communities internationally.

== Biography ==
Al-Ghāmidī was born in Dammam, Eastern Province in 1967. He received his primary education in his hometown, attending Musab bin Umair Elementary School, then Al-Faisal Intermediate School, and finally Al-Shati Secondary School.

He graduated from Imam Mohammad ibn Saud Islamic University at the College of Sharia in Al-Ahsa, where he was reviewing and mastering the Quran, for which he was often noted for his acclaimed tajwīd. In 1990, he memorized the entire Quran at 22 years old.

He worked as a teacher until 1995. He worked as an educational supervisor for Islamic education in Dammam until 2003. He currently works as the general supervisor of Muhammad Al-Fatih Private Schools in Dammam.

Sheikh Saʻad al-Ghāmidī led the Tarāwīḥ prayers, serving as guest imam, in the Prophet's Mosque during Ramadan 2009.

In 2012, he became the imam of the Yousef bin Ahmed Kanoo Mosque in Dammam while also performing in several mosques in the United States, the United Kingdom, Austria, Kuwait, and Bahrain.

He has also produced albums of Islamic nasheeds.

== See also ==
- Saud as-Shuraim
- Abdulrahman al-Sudais
- Yasser al-Dosari
- Abdullah Awad al-Juhany
- Maher al-Mu'aiqly
- Mishary bin Rashid Alafasy
