= Ali Mahmud (Qari) =

Egyptian Quran reciter, religious chanter and composer. (1878–1946)

Sheikh Ali Mahmud
- علي محمود
- Born: 1878; Cairo, Khedivate of Egypt
- Died: 21 December 1946 (aged 67–68)
- Occupations: Qari, religious chanter and composer
- Spouse: Karima al-Adleya

Ali Mahmud (1878 – 21 December 1946) was an Egyptian Quran reciter, teacher, religious chanter and composer. He was known for his Quran recitations and call to prayer at Al-Hussein Mosque in Cairo. He was among the early Quran reciters to recite on Egyptian Radio.

== Early life and education ==
He was born in 1878 in Kafr el-Zaghari neighbourhood of Cairo's El Gamaliya district, near Al-Hussein Mosque, Khedivate of Egypt. He lost his sight after a childhood accident.

He memorised the Quran and studied its recitation, tajwid, and Quranic readings Abu Hashim al-Shabrawi and Mabrouk Hassanein. He also studied music under Ibrahim al-Maghribi, composition and muwashshah under Muhammad Abdel Rahim al-Masloub. He further studied Turkish music under the Iraqi musician Othman al-Mawsili.

== Career ==
He became known for his Quran recitations and religious chanting, particularly a Al-Hussein Mosque in Cairo, where he regularly performed the call to prayer in different melodic modes (maqamat). Among his notable performances was a recitation of the Quran at the Royal Opera House in Cairo during celebrations marking the marriage of King Farouk and Queen Farida in 1938. He reportedly also performed religious chants at the wedding ceremony of Fawzia, sister of King Farouk and the then Crown Prince of Iran Mohammad Reza Pahlavi.

On 3 July 1939, Mahmud Made his first broadcast as an official recognised Quran reciter on Egyptian Radio. He was subsequently scheduled to recite on Monday evenings.

Mahmud was also referred to in accounts of his career as the Sayyid al-Qurrā ("Master of Reciters") and Imām al-Munshidīn ("Imam of Chanters"). Among those associated with his circle were Quran reciters Muhammad Rifat, Kamil Yusuf Al-Bahtimi, Taha el-Fashni, and Muhammad al-Fayyumi.

Mahmud was also involved in musical instruction and composition. His students and musical associates included Zakariyya Ahmad, Mohammed Abdel Wahab, and reportedly also Umm Kulthum and Asmahan.

== Personal life ==
He was reportedly married to Karima al-Adleya, an Egyptian Quran reciter who also performed on Egyptian radio during the 1930s.

== Death and recordings ==
He died on 21 December 1946. His surviving recordings include Quran recitations, religious supplications (ibtihalat), religious chants and songs. His surviving Quran recordings include recitations from Surahs Al-Anfal, Yusuf, Al-Kahf, Maryam, Al-Anbiya and Al-Qiyama, as well as several shorter surahs.
