= Rubina Khalid =

Rubina Khalid may refer to:

- Rubina Khalid (politician), 21st century Pakistani senator
- Rubina Khalid (qaria) (1959–2017), Pakistani Quran reciter
