= Bani Zaid =

Bani Zaid (or Bani Zayd) may refer to:

- Bani Zaid, a neighbourhood in Aleppo, Syria
- Bani Zeid, a town (and a historical tribe) in Palestine
- Banu Zayd, a Nejdi tribe
