= Ahmad Nuaina =

Egyptian Quran reciter and physician (born 1954)

Dr Ahmad Ahmad Nuaina
- أحمد أحمد نعينع
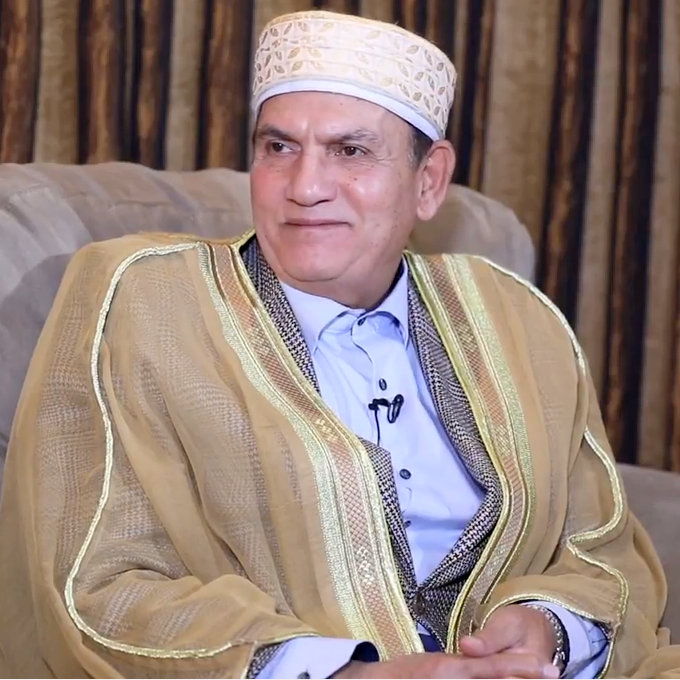
- Born: March 15, 1954 (age 72); Metoubes, Republic of Egypt (present day Egypt)
- Education: Alexandria University (M.Sc. in Pediatrics, M.D.)
- Occupations: Physician, Qari, Academic administrator
- Known for: Quran recitation

Chief of Egyptian Quran recitations
- In office 2025–present

Religious life
- Religion: Islam

Ahmad Ahmad Nuaina (Note: Arabic: أحمد أحمد نعينع, romanized: Ahmed Ahmed Nu'ayna) (born 15 March 1954) is an Egyptian Quran reciter (qāri) and Pediatrician. He is known for his mastery of tajwid and the canonical Quranic readings, his distinctive recitation style influenced by Mustafa Ismail, and his parallel career in medicine. He has served as an official Quran reciter of Egyptian Radio and Television since 1979 and has recited at state ceremonies under several Egyptian presidents. In 2025, he was appointed Egypt's Chief of Quran recitations (Shaykh Umūm al-Maqāri' al-Misriyya).

== Early life and education ==
Nuaina was born on 15 March 1954 in Metoubes, Kafr El Sheikh Governorate, Republic of Egypt. His father was a prominent cotton merchant in the district and served as chairman of the board of the Qabbani Association in Kafr El Sheikh.

Nuaina began studying the Quran at a traditional Quran school (kuttab) at the age of four and completed memorization of the entire Quran before the age of eight. He Studied rules of tajwid under Ahmed el-Shawa while continuing his formal education. He received his primary education in Metoubes and completed his secondary education in Rosetta, Beheira Governorate.

He later enrolled in the Faculty of Medicine at Alexandria University, Where he graduated as a physician and specialized in pediatrics. He earned both master's and doctoral degrees in the field. Following graduation, he worked at Alexandria University Hospital an later held administrative positions, including vice director of the university children's hospital and vice director of a therapeutic institution in Alexandria.

His combined career in medicine and Quranic recitation earned him the epithet "Al-Qāri' al-Tabīb" (lit. 'Physician Reciter').

== Quranic training ==
While studying medicine, Nuaina continued his formal Quranic education. He studied the ten canonical Quranic readings under Sheikh Muhammad Farid al-Nu'mani and his wife, Sheikha Umm al-Saad, a prominent Quran teacher in Alexandria. According to biographical accounts, he attended lessons with them for two hours after the dawn (Fajr) prayer before going to university.

In addition to formal instruction, Nuaina developed his recitation by listening to prominent Egyptian reciters on the radio. Among those he admired were Muhammad Rifat, Abdul Basit Abdus Samad, Abul Ainain Shuaisha, Mahmoud Khalil al-Husary, and Muhammad Siddiq al-Minshawi.

He is particularly associated with the recitation style of Mustafa Ismail, whom he has described as his principal teacher and greatest influence. Nuaina later recalled becoming personally acquainted with Ismail while studying in Alexandria, stating that his admiration increased after observing Ismail's methods of teaching and religious instruction.

== Career ==
=== Quran recitation ===
Nuaina first attracted public attention as a child reciter, when he reportedly recited the Quran in presence of Egyptian president Gamal Abdel Nasser in 1959.

He then gained recognition while still a university student. His voice attracted the attention of Ahmad al-Sayyid Darwish, head of the Muslim Youth Association in Alexandria, where Nuaina regularly recited the Quran. He also served for approximately ten years as a regular reciter at Al-Samak Mosque in Alexandria.

In 1979, Nuaina became an official Quran reciter for Egyptian Radio and Television, bringing his recitation to a national audience. He later recorded the complete Quran in murattal recitation for Egyptian Radio and Abu Dhabi Radio.

=== State ceremonies ===
Nuaina's association with Egyptian state ceremonies began during the presidency of Anwar Sadat, who reportedly praised his recitation and compared it to that of Mustafa Ismail. Sadat subsequently invited him to recite at presidential functions and appointed him as his personal physician and reciter.

Because of his frequent appearances at official events, Nuaina became widely known as the "Presidential Quran Reciter." He continued to recite at state ceremonies during the presidency of Hosni Mubarak and later appeared at official religious events under subsequent administrations.

=== Chief Qari ===
In October 2025, Egypt's Minister of Religious Endowments, Osama al-Azhari, appointed Nuaina as Chief of All Egyptian Quran Recitations (Shaykh Umūm al-Maqāri' al-Misriyyah), (Note: Also translated as Shaykh of All Egyptian Quranic Recitations) heading the General Authority of Egyptian Quran Recitations (Arabic: مشيخة عموم المقارئ المصرية, romanized: Mashiakhat Umum al-Maqari' al-Misriyya), which oversees around 12,000 kuttab (Quranic schools) around Egypt.

== International visits ==
Ahmad Nuaina reciting the Quran in Imam Khomeini hussayniya in the House of the Leadership in Iran in July 2010.

In 1983, Nuaina was invited to Kuwait, where he recited before the country's emir. He visited Qatar in 1984 and, in 1986, accepted an invitation from the Sultan of Brunei, subsequently appearing as a guest of honour in Malaysia.

In 1985, Nuaina participated in an international Quran memorization competition held in New Delhi, India. He reportedly won first place in the competition. He later won first-place honours at international Quran competitions in Malaysia in 1995 and in Brunei, as well as in Indonesia.

In 1997, King Hassan II of Morocco reportedly heard Nuaina reciting the Quran during a dawn broadcast and invited him to Morocco for Ramadan. Nuaina recited there during the kingdom's Ramadan gatherings, attended by the king and senior Moroccan officials.

Nuaina has also been invited to recite at international events organized by Islamic charitable organizations, including events associated with the Islamic Relief Society at the United Nations.

Ahmad Nuaina in the International Quran Competition in Tehran in June 2012

Nuaina (second from right) siting among participants

Nuaina Meets Ali Khamenei

In 2010, Nuaina recited the Quran in the presence of Ali Khamenei in the Imam Khomeini hussayniya in the House of the Leadership in Iran. In 2012, he was selected as member of jury for the 28th International Quran Competition, held in Tehran in June.

In June 2026, he visited United States. The visit included Quran recitations, visits to Quran memorization centres, and assessment of students' knowledge of tajwid. After a controversy, he clarified that his visit was unrelated to the opening ceremony of the 2026 FIFA Worlds Cup.
