= Veve (disambiguation) =

A veve is a Vodun religious symbol.

Veve may also refer to:

- VeVe, a New Zealand company
- Veve (film), a 1914 Kenyan film
- Mount Veve, a Solomonese volcano
- Vevé (footballer) (1918–1964), Brazilian footballer
- VèVè Clark (1944–2007), American writer and academic
- Joanne Rodríguez Veve (born 1983), Puerto Rican lawyer and politician
- Veve Zulfikar (born 2003), Indonesian singer and actress

== See also ==
- Vevey (disambiguation)
- Vevi, a Greek village
