= Kamil Yusuf Al-Bahtimi =

Egyptian Quran reciter (1922–1969)

Shaykh al-Qari Kamil Yusuf al-Bahtimi
- كامل يوسف البهتيمي
- Born: Mohamed Zaki Yusuf; August 12, 1922; Shubra El Kheima, Qalyubiyya Governorate, Kingdom of Egypt
- Died: February 6, 1969 (aged 46); Cairo

Personal life
- Occupation: Qari

Religious life
- Religion: Islam
- Denomination: Sunni

Kamil Yusuf al-Bahtimi (Note: Arabic: كامل يوسف البهتيمي) (6 April 1922 – 6 February 1969), born Mohamed Zaki Yusuf, (Note: Arabic: محمد زكي يوسف) was an Egyptian Qur'an reciter. Known for his distinct style of recitation, he became known among the prominent reciters of his generation. He appeared on Egyptian Radio, recited at Umar Makram Mosque in Cairo, and was invited to perform at presidential ceremonies during the presidency of Gamal Abdel Nasser. He was also known by the nickname "owner of steel throat" and "the reciter of the Republican Palace."

== Early life and education ==
Mohamed Zaki Yusuf was born on 6 April 1922 in the village of Bahtim, in Shubra El Kheima, Qalyubia governorate. His family had a background in Quran recitation, as his father was a Quran reciter and teacher. He enrolled in the village's kuttab (traditional Quran school) at the age of six and memorized the Quran before he was ten. He subsequently began reciting at the village mosque.

He also developed a close association with Muhammad al-Sayfi, who took him to Cairo, where he introduced him to audiences and invited him to accompany him at religious gatherings.

According to a profile published in Al-Ahram, his father enrolled him at Al-Azhar after he had memorized the Quran. However, Ali Gomaa later stated that al-Bahtimi had attended his studies irregularly and did not continue them.

== Career ==
Al-Bahtimi began reciting publicly in his village before gaining recognition in Cairo. His performances at religious gatherings, where he also delivered religious chants (tawashih), contributed to his growing recognition.

Accounts differ regarding the year he joined Egyptian Radio. Some sources give 1946, while other identify 1953. According to his son, Essam al-Bahtimi, his formal association with the Radio began in 1953, following the assistance of al-Sayfi.

Al-Bahtimi also travelled outside Egypt to recite the Quran. Around 1945, he visited Palestine, where he recited during Ramadan on Middle Easter Radio. He also performed in Jerusalem and at religious gatherings in other Arab countries.

In Cairo, he was appointed as a Friday reciter at Umar Makram Mosque in Tahrir Square, a position he held until his death. He also became a reciter at the presidential palace and was invited to perform at official ceremonies during Gamal Abdel Nasser's presidency. He became known as "the reciter of the Republican Palace".

=== Style ===
Al-Bahtimi was recognised for his deep voice and his ability to move between different melodic modes (maqamat) during recitation. He was also noted for the strength of his voice, which earned him the nickname "owner of the steel throat".

His early influences included Egyptian reciters Muhammad Rif'at and Mohamed Salamah.

== Illness and death ==
In 1967, al-Bahtimi while performing at a memorial gathering in Port Said, where he reportedly became unable to continue reciting. Accounts state that he subsequently experienced partial paralysis. Although he received treatment and recovered to some extent, his voice did not fully regain its previous strength.

He died on 6 February 1969, aged 46, reportedly from a cerebral haemorrhage. According to Egyptian accounts, his funeral was held with military honours on the orders of President Nasser, and numerous Quran reciters, led by Mahmoud al-Hussary, participated in reciting the Quran at his funeral.

== Recording and legacy ==
Al-Bahtimi left behind a collection of recorded Quranic recitations preserved the archives of Egyptian Radio. He also recorded approximately portions of the Quran in murattal style for the Supreme Council for Islamic Affairs. His recording continue to be broadcast and circulated among listeners of Quran recitation around the world.

== See also ==
- Mahmoud Khalil Al-Hussary
- Muhammad Siddiq Al-Minshawi
