= Ali As-Suwaisy =

Egyptian Quran reciter (1926–2002)

Ali as-Suwaisy
- علي حجاج السويسي
- Born: 10 September 1926; Cairo, Kingdom of Egypt
- Died: 9 September 2002 (aged 75)
- Known for: Quran recitation in Saba maqam

Ali Hajjaj As-Suwaisy (Note: Arabic: على حسن السويسى) (10 September 1926 – 9 September 2002) was an Egyptian Quran reciter, known for his recitation style, which was influenced by the Egyptian reciter Muhammad Rif'at, and for his use of the Saba maqam. He became an official reciter for Egyptian Radio and recorded the complete Quran for broadcast.

== Early life and education ==
As-Suwaisy was born in the al-Gamaliyya district of Cairo, he came from a family whose origins were in al-Badari, Asyut Governorate. His father worked as a senior clerk at a Sharia court in Cairo. As-Suwaisy memorized the Quran at approximately nine years of age under Abu Aziz al-Sahhar and began reciting publicly during childhood.

During his childhood, As-Suwaisy regularly attended recitations by Muhammad Rif'at at Fadil Pasha Mosque in Cairo. he later adopted elements of Rif'at's recitation style, which remained an important influence throughout his career.

== Career ==
=== Egyptian radio ===
As-Suwaisy entered Egyptian radio broadcasting in the 1940s and was formally approved as a radio reciter, reportedly in 1951. He also studied music theory and Oud at the Institute of Arabic Music for four years. He became associated with the Saba maqam, which was frequently mentioned in accounts of his recitation style.

As-Suwaisy performed at religious gatherings and Ramadan events in Cairo and other Egyptian cities. he was appointed as a Quran reciters at local mosques, including al-Fath Mosque in Cairo, where he succeeded Mahmoud al-Bujairimi.

He recorded the complete Quran in a measured recitation style, known as murattal, for Egyptian Radio.

=== International recitations ===
As-Suwaisy travelled to several countries to recite the Quran, including countries in the Arab world. He also visisted Libya and accompanied the Egyptian reciter Mustafa Ismail there during the years following the 1969 Libyan revolution.

He recorded Quranic recitations for broadcasters outside Egypt, including those in Saudi Arabia and Kuwait.

As-Suwaisy is also reported to have visited the UK on several occasions, in particular attending the London Central Mosque during Ramadan.

== Death ==
As-Suwaisy died on 9 September 2002, one day before his 76th birthday.

== See also ==
- Mohamed Siddiq El-Minshawi
- Abdul Basit 'Abd us-Samad
- Mahmud Ali al-Banna
