= Muhammad Jibril (Qari) =

Egyptian Quran Reciter (born 1964)

- محمد جبريل
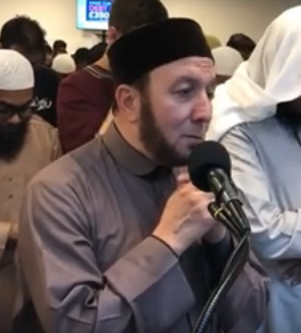
- Sheikh Muhammad Jibril
- Born: Muhammad Muhammad Al-Sayyid Hasanain Jibril; 1964 (age 61–62); Shibin El Qanater, Qalyubia Governorate, Egypt
- Education: Al-Azhar University
- Occupation: Imam at Amr ibn al-As Mosque
- Years active: 1988 - 2019
- Known for: Quran Recitation,Tarawih prayers at Amr ibn al-As Mosque
- Website: jebril.com

Muhammad Muhammad Al-Sayyid Hasanain Jibril (born 1964), commonly known as Sheikh Muhammad Jibril, is an Egyptian Qari (Quran reciter) and Islamic scholar. He is best known for his decades-long tenure as the Imam of the Amr ibn al-As Mosque in Cairo, where he led the] prayers from 1988 until 2015. He currently resides in London, United Kingdom.

== Early life and education ==
Jibril was born in 1964 in the village of Tahouriya in the Qalyubia Governorate of Egypt. He memorized the Quran at the age of nine. He attended Al-Azhar University, graduating with a Bachelor's degree (Licentiate) in] Sharia and Law.

== Career ==
=== Amr ibn al-Aas Mosque ===
In 1988, Jibril was appointed as the Imam for the Tarawih prayers at the Amr ibn al-As Mosque, the oldest mosque in Africa. His recitations attracted hundreds of thousands of worshippers, particularly during Laylat al-Qadr, causing significant logistical challenges in Old Cairo due to the massive crowds.

=== Media and institutions ===
Jibril hosted several religious programs on television, including Aya wa Dua (A Verse and a Supplication) on Egyptian television and Ahbab Allah (Beloved of God) on Jordanian television, the latter co-hosted with Dr. Ahmed Noufal. He established the International Islamic Center for Quranic Sciences (Dar Ubayy ibn Ka'b) in Cairo in 1996.

== 2015 controversy and travel Ban ==
On July 13, 2015, during the 27th night of Ramadan, Jibril led a supplication (Qunut) that included prayers against "tyrant leaders" and "corrupt media." The Egyptian Ministry of Endowments construed this as a political attack on the post-2013 government.

On July 14, 2015, Minister of Endowments Mohamed Mokhtar Gomaa banned Jibril from preaching in any mosque in Egypt. On July 15, Jibril was prevented from traveling to London at Cairo International Airport by security authorities.

=== Legal verdict ===
Jibril challenged the travel ban in the administrative court. On October 27, 2015, the Court of Administrative Justice ruled in his favor, annulling the travel ban on the grounds that it was issued without a judicial order, violating Article 62 of the Egyptian Constitution. Following the verdict, Jibril relocated to London.
