= Abdullah Matroud =

Saudi Qari and Imam

Abdullah Al-Matrood
- عبد الله بن محمد بن عبد الله المطرود
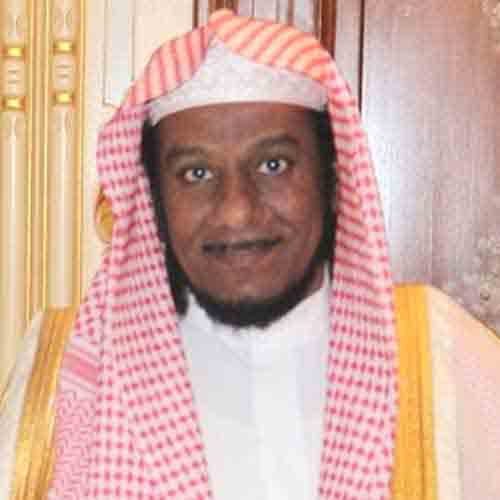

Personal life
- Born: 1963 (age 62–63) Al-Kharj, Saudi Arabia
- Education: Imam Muhammad bin Saud Islamic University (Ph.D)
- Occupation: imam, Qari, Khatib

Religious life
- Religion: Islam
- Abdullah Al Matroud recitation Recitation of Al-Qadr

Abdullah bin Mohammad al-Matroud (Arabic: عبد الله بن محمد المطرود) is a Saudi Qari, born in Al-Kharj in 1963 (1383 AH). He is the Imam of Fahd bin Abdullah Al-Murshid Mosque in Diriyah and also of Prince Bandar bin Abdulaziz Al Saud Mosque.

== Biography ==
=== Birth ===
Abdullah bin Mohammad bin Abdullah al-Matroud was born in Al-Kharj Saudi Arabia in 1963. He would lead prayers at age of 15.

=== Education ===
He obtained his Ph.D. in 2003 (1424 AH) from Imam Mohammad Ibn Saud Islamic University, the title of his thesis is Arabic: الصوفية في القرن الرابع الهجري ورد علماء السلف عليهم في نفس القرن, lit. '(Sufism in the fourth century Hijri and the responses of the early scholars to them in the same century)'.

Abdullah Al-Matroud tells the story of his transformation:

“ At the beginning of my life during middle and high school, I was a singer, as I used to sing on stage. I was an athlete, as I won first place in gymnastics in elementary school in the Riyadh region. I was a goalkeeper in football, and I played tennis and volleyball. I was also an actor, and I won first place in the Kingdom in the Jeddah region. At the beginning of high school, there was a great professor named Falah bin Mubarak Al-Atari, who taught at Riyadh High School. He was one of the reasons that made me take the path of guidance and calling to God. He heard my voice while reciting the Holy Quran, so he encouraged me and said: It is better than singing. So I began to maintain the recitation of the Holy Quran and Islamic songs, and I continued on this beautiful path. And from the encouragement of this professor, he introduced me to lead prayers in one of the mosques, and after that, God opened my eyes, and I walked on the right path, praise be to God. ”

— Abdullah Al-Matroud,
