= Nasr El-Din Tobar =

Egyptian religious chanter and Quran reciter (1920–1986)

Nasr el-Din Tobar
- نصر الدين طوبار
- Born: 7 June 1920; El Manzala, Dakahlia Governorate, Sultanate of Egypt
- Died: 16 November 1986 (aged 66); Egypt
- Occupations: Religious chanter and Quran reciter

Nasr el-Din Tobar (7 June 1920 – 16 November 1986) was an Egyptian Quran reciter and religious chanter. He became known for his Quran recitation throughout the Dakahlia Governorate and Egypt.

== Early life ==
Nasr el-Din Tobar was born in El Manzala, Dakahlia Governorate. He studied Arabic and memorised the Quran in childhood.

== Career ==
Tobar performed in local religious gatherings. He was accepted into Egyptian Radio in 1956, as a Quran reciter and religious chanter, after earlier being rejected 6 consecutive times. He also performed religious supplications (ibtihalat), which notably include Ya Malik al Mulk, Ya Salikin al-Darb, Kull al-Qulub ila al-Habib Tamiel, among other.

In 1978, he recorded Quran recitation in collaboration with reciter Mahmoud el-Bajirmi, for the Saudi Arabian Radio and Television.

In 1980, He was selected as the supervisor and leader of religious Chanting Ensemble affiliated with Egypt's Academy of Arts. He performed with the ensemble first time in Alexandria Opera House. In 1986, he was appointed as a Quran reciter and chanter of tawashih (religious hymns) at al-Khazindara Mosque in Shubra, Cairo.

Nasr el-Din Tobar in 1982

His notable international performance include Chanting at the Royal Albert Hall in London during the World Islamic Conference in 1980. He also performed religious chants and Eid takbir at Al-Aqsa Mosque alongside reciters Mustafa Ismail, Abdul Basit 'Abd us-Samad, during Egyptian President Anwar Sadat's visit to Jerusalem in 1977.

== Death ==
Nasr el-Din Tobar died on 16 November 1986, at the age of 66.
