= Mohamed Salamah =

Egyptian Quran reciter and teacher (1899 – 1982)

Shayk al-Qari Mohamed Salamah
- محمد سلامة
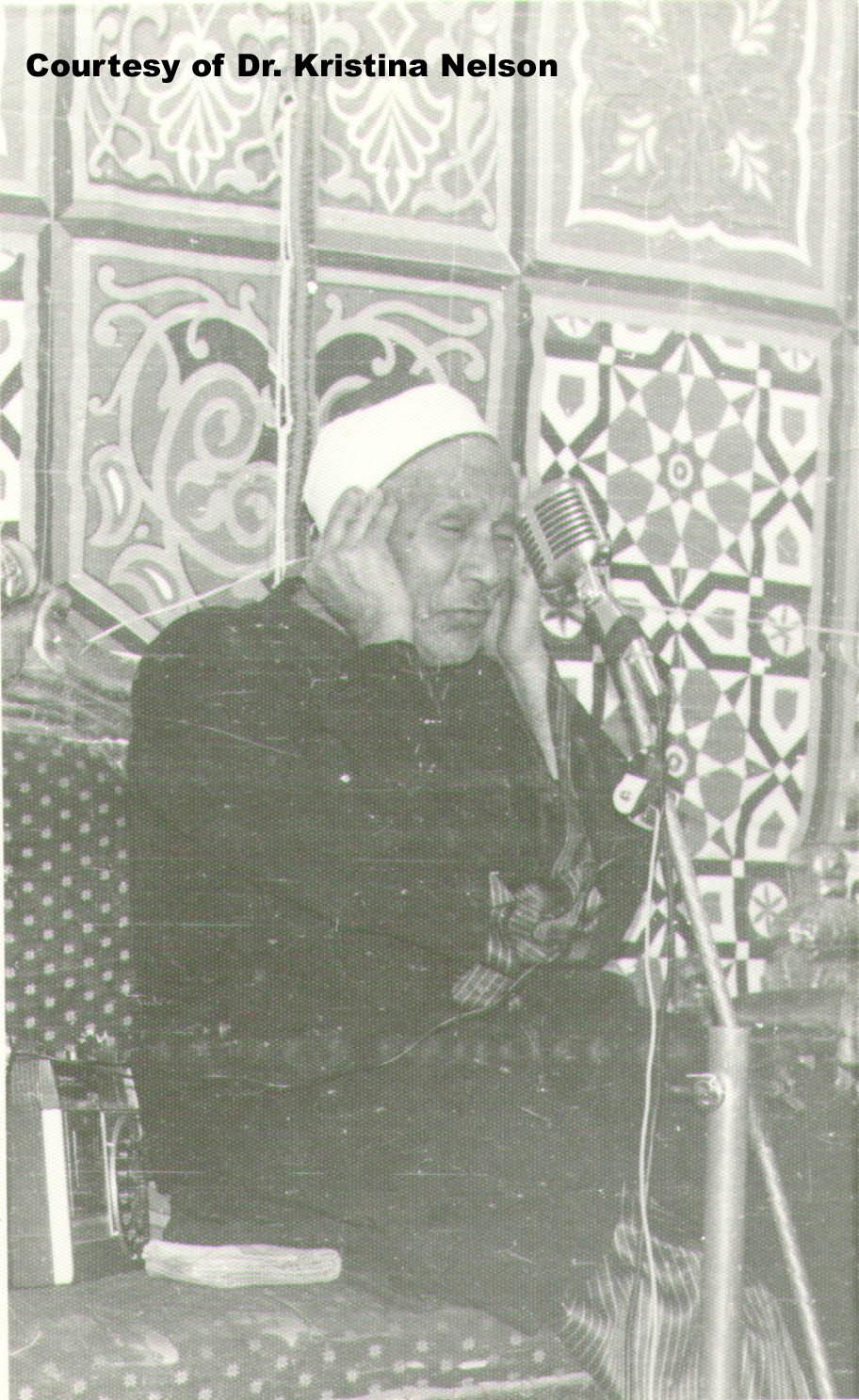
- Born: 1899; Qalyubia Governorate, Khedivate of Egypt (present-day Egypt)
- Died: May 11, 1982 (aged 82–83)

Religious life
- Religion: Islam
- Denomination: Sunni
- Profession: Qari

Mohamed Salamah (Note: Arabic: محمد سلامة) (1899 – 11 May 1982) was an Egyptian Quran reciter and teacher. Born in Musturud, Qalyubia Governorate, Khedivate of Egypt, he was among the prominent reciters of Egypt during the early and mid-20th century. He was known for his distinctive style of recitation and his influence on later generations of reciters. Salamah initially refused to record Quran recitation for radio, considering the practice religiously impermissible, but eventually agreed to record in 1948.

== Early life and education ==
Mohamed Salamah was born in 1899 in Musturud, in the Qalyubia Governorate of Egypt. He memorised the Quran at an early age and subsequently studied in Al-Azhar University. He began reciting publicly at around the age of ten.

He studied under the Egyptian Quran reciter Mohamed el-Sayfi, whom he frequently accompanied and occasionally represented at religious gatherings. After el-Sayfi moved to Al-Hussein Mosque, Salamah succeeded him as a reciter at the Sayyida Fatima al-Nabawiyya Mosque in Cairo.

Salamah participated in the Egyptian Revolution of 1919. Following the First World War, he moved to Palestine, before returning to Egypt during the 1930s.

== Career ==
Salamah became one of the recognised Quran reciter of his generation and was active during what is often described as the golden age of Egyptian Quran recitation. He developed a distinct approach to recitation, emphasising the relationship between the vocal melody and the meaning of the verses. His style was associated with the direct and relatively restrained approach of his teacher, Mohamed el-Sayfi, and the earlier recitation tradition of Ali Mahmud (d. 1946).

In 1937 he participated in a conference of Quran reciters which led to the establishment of a Reciters' Association (Rabitat al-Qurra).

=== Radio recordings ===
Salamah initially to refuse to record Quran recitations for radio, as he considered the practice religiously impermissible and maintained this position for several years, refusing offers to record, including an invitation from Palestine Radio. His objections reportedly also concerned the conditions under which recordings would be broadcast, including their possible use in unsuitable public places. He eventually changed his position and began recording for Egyptian radio in 1948. His recordings continued until his death, allowing his recitations to reach a wider audience.

=== Teaching and influence ===
Salamah was a teacher of the Quran recitation and influenced several prominent Egyptian reciters. Among his prominent students were Kamil Yusuf Al-Bahtimi and Mohamed Siddiq El-Minshawi, both of whom reportedly lived and studied at his home for a period.

He also taught other prominent reciters and musicians of his time, including Sayyid Darwish and Zakariyya Ahmad.

== Recitation style ==
Salamah was known for his distinctive physical posture while reciting. Rather than sitting in the conventional cross-legged position, he reportedly sat on his knees in a posture resembling the Sitting position in salah. When moving from lower vocal register (qarar) to the higher register (jawab), he would raise himself onto his knees, coordinating his movements with changes in vocal pitch.

He reportedly favoured powerful and dignified voice, believing that strength and solemnity were important qualities in Quran recitation. He was also known for his reserved manner and limited gestures while performing.

== Death and legacy ==
Mohamed Salamah died on 11 May 1982, reportedly after suffering a heart attack while reciting the Quran at a gathering.

In recognition of his contribution to Egyptian cultural and religious heritage, the National Organization for Urban Harmony included his name in its Hikayat Shari' (Street Stories) project, placing a commemorative street sign in Port Said.
