= Abu Bakr ash-Shatry =

Saudi Quran reciter

- أبو بكر الشاطري

Personal life
- Born: January 1, 1970 (age 56) Jeddah, Saudi Arabia

Religious life
- Religion: Sunni Islam

Abu Bakr ibn Muhammad ash-Shatry (Arabic: أَبُو بَكْر بِن مُحَمَّد اَلشَّاطْرِي; born January 1, 1970) is a Saudi Quran reciter (qāri’) and imam.

== Biography ==
Abu Bakr Ash-Shatry was born on 1 January 1970 in Jeddah, Saudi Arabia. Of Yemeni descent.

Ash-Shatry grew up in Jeddah and graduated with a degree in Quranic studies from Sheikh Ayman Rushdi Suweid in 1416 AH (circa 1994 AD), and four years later received a master's degree in accounting and he began learning to read the Quran in the 5th grade of primary school, when he began attending summer courses. He learned to read the Quran under the guidance of Ayman Suweid. He received an ijaza for reading Hafs from Asim.

He made two complete recordings of the Quran. The first recording was made in 1988, and the second in 2006. He led prayers and delivered sermons in many mosques in Saudi Arabia. He was the imam of the Sacred Mosque. He is currently the imam of the al-Furqan Mosque in Hay Annasim (Jeddah).

He has held numerous conferences in countries such as Bahrain, Morocco, Egypt, South Africa, and Kuwait.

In 2013, he became the chairman of the jury of the 14th International Quran Recitation Competition in the Moscow Cathedral Mosque.

In March 2020, he recovered from COVID-19.

He is married and has four children.
