= Vevey (disambiguation) =

Vevey is a town in the canton of Vaud, Switzerland, on the shores of Lake Geneva.

Vevey may also refer to:

- Vevey District former district of Vaud based on the town, merged in 2006 into Riviera-Pays-d'Enhaut district
- FC Vevey United, football club in the town
- Vevey railway station, in the town
- Vevey (The Warlocks album), 2017 album recorded live in the town in 2016

== See also ==
- Vevay (disambiguation)
- Veve (disambiguation)
- Veveyse District, canton of Fribourg, Switzerland
