= Hamed Shakernejad =

Iranian qari (born 1983)

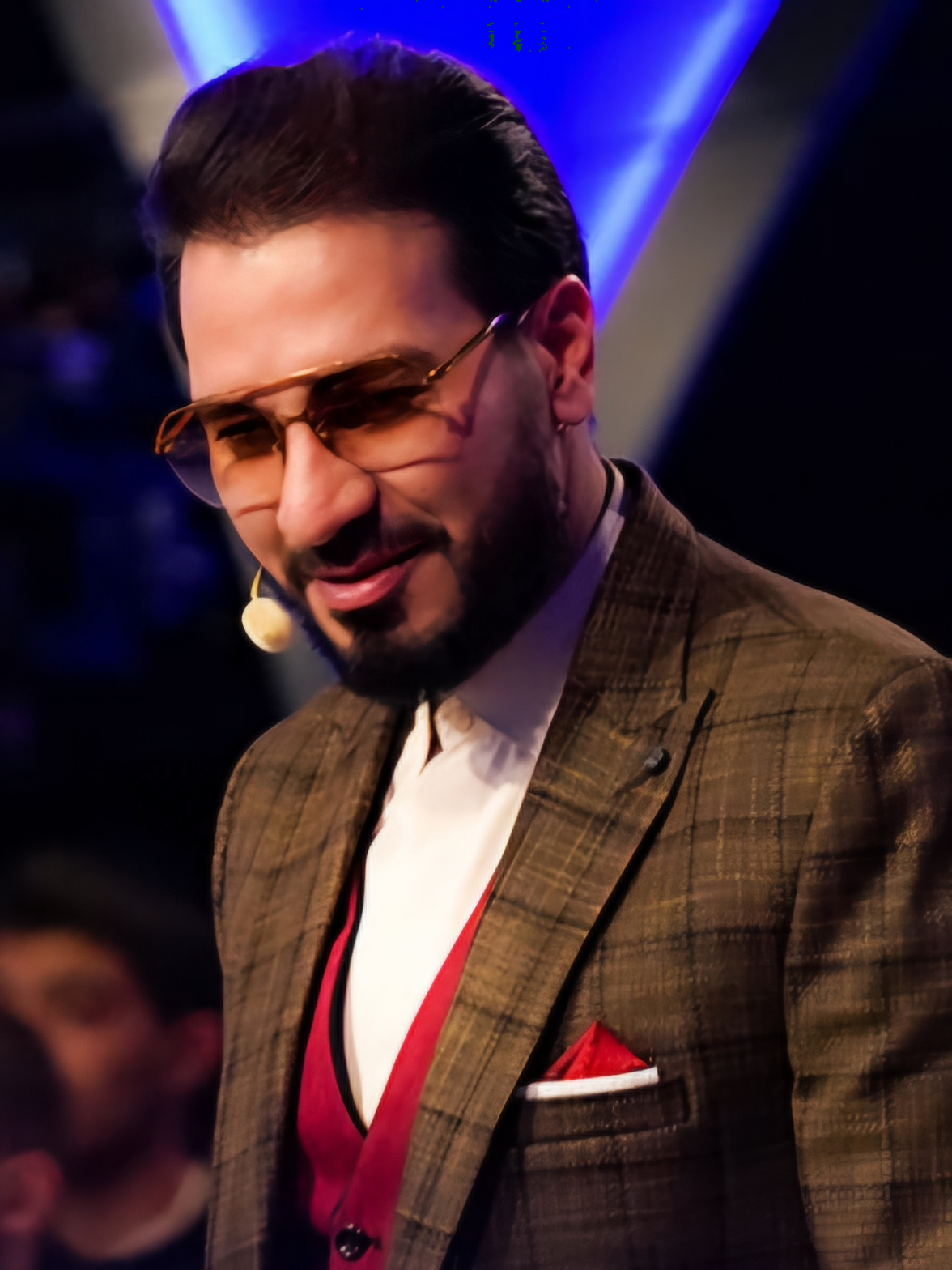
- Hamed Shakernejad in Mahfel
- Born: 20 April 1983 (age 43); Mashhad, Iran
- Education: Quranic Sciences PhD; Bachelor of Business Administration
- Occupation: Qari (Qur'an Reciter)
- Known for: Iranian Qāriʾ
- Title: Qari ed Shakernejad

Hamed Shakernejad (Persian: حامد شاکرنژاد; born in April 1983, Mashhad, Iran) is an Iranian qari (reciter of the Qur'an). Shakernejad won a world qira'at competition on 15 March 1996 in Saudi Arabia. This win was followed by a gift from king Fahd of Saudi Arabia: entering the Kaaba for an hour. This was the first time that an Iranian qari had entered the Kaaba.

== Early life and education ==
Hamed Shakernejad was born in Mashhad near the Shrine of Imam Reza. At an early age, he and his brother joined Quranic study circles under the guidance of renowned Iranian reciters such as Haj Mahmoud Forghani, Haj Javad and Haj Mojtaba Sadat Fatemi. His father, Haj Mohammad Shakernejad, was also a Quran reciter, who played a crucial role in training him and his brother.

Hamed and his older brother, Hameed, learnt recitation of Quran from their father and teachers at school. They began reciting at a very young age. Surprisingly, Hamed became much more famous and well known as compared to his brother Hameed. He later started imitating the famous Egyptian Qari, Mustafa Ismail, which significantly influenced his unique style.

Shakernejad holds a master's degree in business administration and a PhD in Quranic sciences. His journey in Quran recitation began at the age of five, when he started learning by imitating famous Qaris. His parents, recognizing his talent, supported both him and his older brother, Hamid Shakernejad, who also became a distinguished Quran reciter.

=== Family and marriage ===
Hamed Shakernejad got married in the early 1990s and has a child. His wife is also a Quranic sciences instructor who teaches at the university.

== Beginning of Quranic recitation ==
Shakernejad recalls that he was five years old in 1987 when he began reciting the Holy Quran with encouragement from his family. His parents would reward him with gifts such as toy cars, bicycles, and remote-controlled cars to motivate him.

=== First national competition win ===
At the age of 12, in 1995, Shakernejad competed in Iran’s National Student Quran Competition, where he won first place—astonishing the judges with his talent.

=== International recognition in Saudi Arabia ===
After winning the national championship, he memorized five Juz of the Quran in just two months and participated in the International Quran Competition in Saudi Arabia in 1996. Competing in the adult category, he won first place, becoming the first Iranian Qari to achieve this feat.

=== Special recognition from King Fahd ===
In recognition of his achievement, he was personally honored by King Fahd of Saudi Arabia, receiving:

1. A financial reward
2. An exclusive spiritual honor—a one-hour private visit inside the Kaaba, a privilege granted to very few individuals

=== New recitation style and endorsement by Iran’s Supreme Leader ===
Shakernejad later introduced a new style of Quranic recitation, which was officially endorsed by Iran’s Supreme Leader, Ayatollah Ali Khamenei. His unique approach influenced many young reciters across Iran and other countries, who began to follow his methods.

== Contributions to Quranic studies ==
=== Director of the National Quranic Recitation Plan ===
Hamed Shakernejad proposed and initiated the National Quranic Recitation Plan, which was officially launched during the 20th International Quran Exhibition in Tehran. The plan, managed by Shakernejad himself, focuses on:

- Identifying and nurturing young Quranic talents
- Providing systematic training in Quran recitation and Tajweed
- Enhancing Quranic education across Iran

=== Hand and body movements in recitation ===
Shakernejad is known for his expressive hand and head movements while reciting the Quran. He explains that these movements are not deliberate, but rather natural expressions of the meaning of the verses.

== Major awards and recognitions ==
Hamed Shakernejad has won numerous national and international Quranic competitions, including:

1. First place in the Mashhad Student Quran Competition (1995)
2. First place in the Holy Quran Competition for Students in Khorasan Province (1995)
3. First place in the National Student Quran Competition (1995)
4. First place in the Holy Quran Endowments and Charity Affairs Competition in Mashhad (1995)
5. First place in the Holy Quran Endowment Competition in Khorasan Province (1995)
6. First place in the National Holy Quran Endowments and Charity Competition (1995)
7. First place in the Saudi Arabian International Quran Competition (Recitation and Memorization of Five Parts) (1996)

== Public appearances and programs ==
=== Judge in "Mahfel" (محفل) TV program ===
In 2023 (1402 SH), Shakernejad gained mainstream recognition in Iran when he appeared as a judge and expert in the popular Quranic television show "Mahfel" (محفل). His role as a mentor to young reciters further elevated his status in the Quranic community.

=== International Quran recitations ===
Shakernejad has traveled extensively, reciting the Holy Quran in various countries, including Turkey, Saudi Arabia, Pakistan, Qatar, United Arab Emirates, Syria, Lebanon, Indonesia, Bangladesh, Malaysia, Iraq, and Tanzania.

His recitations have been widely broadcast on television, radio, and digital platforms, inspiring millions of listeners worldwide.
