= Noreen Muhammad Siddiq =

Sudanese imam and Quran reciter (1982–2020)

Noreen Mohammad Siddiq
- Born: 1982; North Kordofan, Sudan
- Died: 7 November 2020 (aged 37–38); Khartoum, Sudan
- Known for: Qāriʾ and Imam

Noreen Mohammad Siddiq (Arabic: نُورِين مُحَمَّد صِدِّيق, first name also spelled Norayn, Nurain, Nureyn, last name also spelled Siddig or Siddique) (1982 – 7 November 2020) was a Sudanese imam who was known for his recitations of the Quran. He was an imam of the Khartoum Grand Mosque, the Sayeda Sanhori Mosque, the Al-Nour Mosque, and other famous mosques within the capital city of Sudan, Khartoum.

He died in a car crash at the age of 38.

== Personal life ==
Siddiq had four wives and eight children, both male and female, with his eldest child being female.

== Biography ==
Siddiq was born in 1982 in a town called Farajab, Sudan. In 1998, he enrolled in khalwa school in Khorsi and became a student of the renowned scholar Sheikh Makki in Sudan. After graduation, he continued his studies of Islam in Khorsi, spending 20 years seeking education under various scholars. Later, he became a disciple of Sheikh Makki in Khartoum, the capital of Sudan. Siddiq was born in Umm Dam locality in North Kordofan state and grew up in a spiritual household. At the age of 17, he memorized the Qur’an in the qira'at of Al-Douri 'an Abi 'Amr and Hafs. He later enrolled in the Islamic Holy Quran University, where he graduated. Siddiq participated in several international Qur'an competitions, notably placing in competitions in Malaysia, Dubai, Saudi Arabia, and Libya.

Siddiq gained popularity across the Muslim world through videos of his recitations on social media. Several videos of Siddiq have garnered millions of views on YouTube.

On 7 November 2020, Siddiq was killed in a car accident in Khartoum at the age of 38. Three other reciters of the Quran were also killed: Ali Yaqoub, Abdullah Awad Al-Karim, and Muhannad Al-Kinani. A fourth reciter, Sayed bin Omar, was injured. The group were about 18 kilometers from Omdurman returning from Wadi Halfa when their car allegedly collided with a truck. There was an outpouring of tributes shared on social media after his death.

== Style of recitation ==
After his passing, Omar Suleiman tweeted "The world has lost one of the most beautiful [voices] of our time."

Hind Makki, a Sudanese-American interfaith educator said regarding Siddiq's recitation that "There is an African authenticity that people point to even if they are not able to articulate exactly what it is and they like it," she said.

Siddiq was able to recite in the qira'at of Al Douri 'an Abi 'Amr and Hafs.

== See also ==
- Quran
- Qira'at
