= Muhammad Yahya Rasool Nagari =

Pakistani Quran reciter and recitation teacher (died 2020)

Qari Muhammad Yahya Rasool Nagari

Personal life
- Died: 31 May, 2020 (aged 75) Okara, Pakistan

Religious life
- Religion: Islam
- Denomination: Sunni

Muslim leader
- Influenced by: Qari Izhar Ahmad Thanvi
- Influenced: Saud Al-Shuraim

Muhammad Yahya ibn Noorullah Baloch Rasool Nagari (died 31 May 2020) was a Pakistani Quran reciter and recitation teacher. He was known for his skills in Tajwid and Qira'at.

== Biography ==
Rasool Nagari studied the rules of recitation under Izhar Ahmad Thanvi. He joined Jamia Aziziyah in Sahiwal as a teacher in 1970 and taught there for about fifty years. His students include Saud Al-Shuraim. Rasool Nagari was fondly called 'the father of Qira'at' by his followers. He died on 31 May 2020, aged 75. On 1 June 2020, he was buried in Okara, Pakistan.

Of his family, his son Izhar Ahmad Baloch is patron of Markazi Jamiat Ahle Hadith, Sahiwal District, brother Hafeez Ullah Baloch is a Pakistan Tehreek-e-Insaf leader and son-in-law Abdul Basit Baloch is a journalist .

== Literary works ==
- As-hal al-Tajwid fi al-Quran al-Majeed
- Tuhfat al-Qur'a
