= Vevay =

Vevay can refer to:

- Vevay, Indiana
- Vevay Township, Michigan

== See also ==
- Vevey (disambiguation)
