= Ahmad bin Ali Al-Ajmi =

Saudi Quran reciter and imam (born 1968)

Ahmad bin Ali bin Muhammad Al-Sulaiman Al-Ajmi
- أحمد بن علي بن محمد آل سليمان العجمي
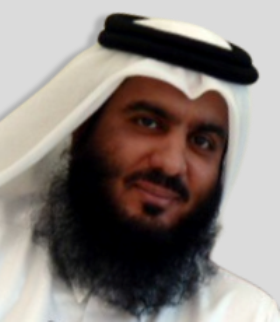
- Born: 24 February 1968 (age 58); Khobar, Saudi Arabia
- Occupation: Qari
- Known for: Quran recitation
- Children: Abdullah, Omar, Fatima, Mariam, Moudhi, and Abdulrahman

Sheikh Ahmad bin Ali Al-Ajmi (Arabic: أحمد بن علي العجمي) is a Saudi Quran reciter and imam.

== Life ==
Ahmad Al-Ajmi attended elementary school at Al-Mohammadiya School in southern Khobar, middle school at Al-Zubair bin Al-Awwam Middle School, and high school at Khobar High School in Khobar, specifically Madinat Al-Umal (مدينة العمال).

After finishing high school, he studied at Imam Mohammad Ibn Saud Islamic University and graduated with a bachelor's degree in Sharia.

He married a woman from the Al-Badran family and has six children.

== Ethnicity ==
Sheikh Al-Ajmi is Arab and not Ajami. His surname indicates that he belongs to the Al Sulaiman branch of the Arabian Ajman tribe.
