= Abdullah Awad Al Juhany =

Imam of Masjid al-Haram

Abdullah Awwad Al Juhany
- عبد الله عواد الجهني
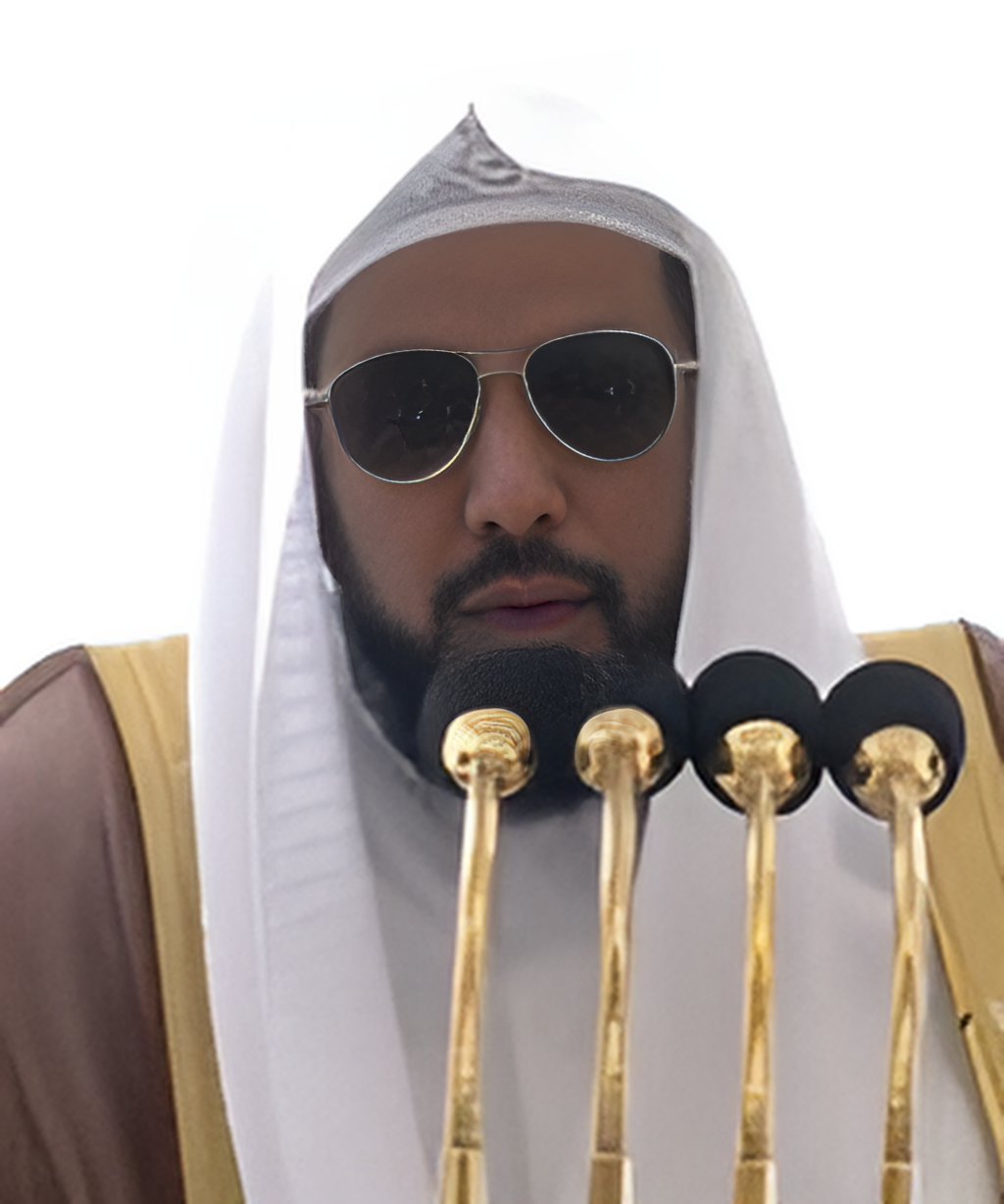

Imam of Masjid al-Haram
- Title: Imam, Sheikh

Personal life
- Born: 13 January 1976 (age 50) Medina, Saudi Arabia
- Education: Islamic University of Madinah (B.A.); Umm al-Qura University (Ph.D.)
- Known for: Imam Of Masjid Al-Haram
- Occupation: Imam, Qari Sheikh

Religious life
- Religion: Islam
- Jurisprudence: Hanbali

Abdullah Awad Al Juhany (Arabic: عبد الله عواد الجهني), is one of the ten Imams of the Grand Mosque Masjid al-Haram in Mecca. He holds a B.A. from the faculty of Qur'an at the Islamic University of Madinah, and a doctorate (Ph.D.) from Umm al-Qura University in Mecca.

Juhany has led the Taraweeh prayers during Ramadan in Mecca since 2005. His voice has been widely recorded and is internationally distributed by various communities.

== Career ==
He was appointed as an permanent imam of Masjid Al Haram, Mecca in July 2007 while before he started leading taraweeh from 2005. He is or has been an imam of Masjid Al Haram in Mecca, Masjid Al Nabawi in Medina, Masjid Quba and Masjid Qiblatain.

== See also ==
- Saud as-Shuraim
- Abdulrahman As-Sudais
- Saad Al-Ghamdi
