= Mahmoud Ahmad El Akkawi =

Lebanese Islamic scholar and Quran reciter

- محمود أحمد عكاوي
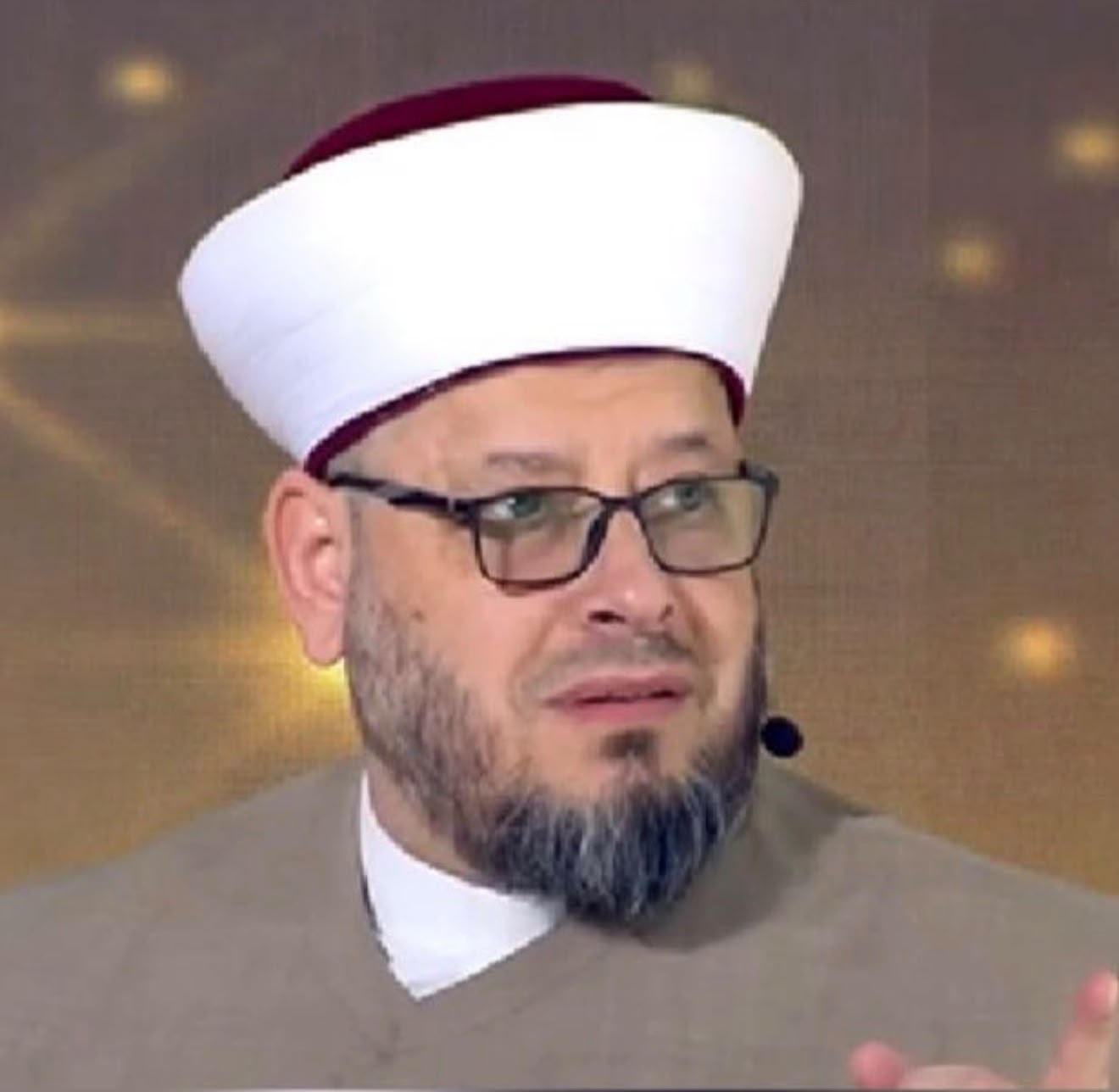
- Portrait
- Born: Mahmoud Ahmad El Akkawi; 1 January 1971 (age 55); Beirut, Lebanon
- Education: Institute of Qira'at, Al-Azhar University
- Occupations: Islamic scholar, Quran reciter, educator
- Employer(s): Dar al-Fatwa, Lebanon
- Known for: Shaykh al-Qurrāʾ of Beirut; specialist in the Ten Qira'at; international Quran competition judge

Mahmoud Ahmad El Akkawi (Arabic: محمود أحمد عكاوي; born 1 January 1971) is a Lebanese Islamic scholar, Quran reciter (qāriʾ), educator, and specialist in the canonical Quranic readings. He serves as the Shaykh al-Qurrāʾ (Chief Quran Reciter) of Beirut and is Director of the Quran Service Center (Markaz Khidmat al-Qur'an) affiliated with Dar al-Fatwa in Lebanon. He is also known internationally as a judge in Quran memorization and recitation competitions.

== Early life ==
El Akkawi was born in Beirut, Lebanon, in 1971. According to an interview published by Al Jazeera, he developed an interest in the Quran during childhood after witnessing young Quran memorizers at a local mosque. He began memorizing independently at the age of eleven before enrolling in formal religious studies. He completed his secondary Islamic education at Azhar Lebanon in 1989 before continuing advanced studies in Syria and Egypt.

== Education ==
El Akkawi pursued advanced studies in the science of Quranic recitation (Qira'at) at the Institute of Qira'at of Al-Azhar University. He obtained: * Higher Certificate in the Ten Minor Readings (Ash-Shatibiyyah and Ad-Durrah) * Specialized Degree in the Ten Major Readings (Tayyibat an-Nashr) * Bachelor's degree in Islamic Sharia He studied the Ten Readings under Sheikh Omar Raihan in Damascus before completing further specialization under Sheikh Abdul Hakim Abdul Latif Abdullah.

== Career ==
Following his completion of advanced studies, El Akkawi became active in Quranic education and administration in Lebanon. In 2005 he was appointed Shaykh al-Qurrāʾ of Beirut by the Grand Mufti of the Lebanese Republic. He later became Director of the Quran Service Center in Beirut, an institution operating under Dar al-Fatwa that provides Quran memorization, recitation, and Qira'at education throughout the Lebanese capital.

== Work with Dar al-Fatwa ==
Within Dar al-Fatwa, El Akkawi has served in several leadership capacities relating to Quranic education. His documented responsibilities include: * Director of the Quran Service Center in Beirut. * Member of the Committee for Reviewing Printed Qurans. * Chairman of the committee responsible for selecting Lebanon's representatives for international Quran competitions. * Supervisor of Quranic educational projects organized by Dar al-Fatwa. He has also overseen initiatives encouraging Quran memorization among school students and expanding Quran education across Beirut.

== International Judging ==
El Akkawi has served as a judge in numerous national and international Quran competitions. According to published biographies and media reports, he has participated as an international judge in competitions held in Lebanon, Algeria, Qatar, Canada, Australia, and the United States. He has been a permanent member of the judging panel for the Tijan Al-Noor Quran Competition broadcast by Jeem TV in Qatar. In 2019 he served on the international judging committee for the Algeria International Quran Prize, where he was officially honored by the Lebanese ambassador in Algeria for his participation.

== Teaching ==
El Akkawi has taught Quran recitation, Tajwid, and the Ten Qira'at to students from Lebanon and abroad. Through the Quran Service Center, he has supervised Quran memorization programs, teacher training, and advanced certification (Ijazah) in Quran recitation. He has delivered lectures and workshops on Quranic sciences in Lebanon and internationally.

== Scholarly views ==
El Akkawi has emphasized the importance of direct oral transmission (mushāfahah) in learning the Quranic readings. In interviews he has stated that the science of Qira'at cannot be fully transmitted through digital media alone and requires direct recitation before qualified teachers within an authenticated chain of transmission (isnād).

== Recognition ==
El Akkawi is regarded as one of Lebanon's contemporary specialists in Quranic recitation and Qira'at. His appointments within Dar al-Fatwa and repeated participation in international Quran competitions have contributed to his recognition throughout the Arab and Muslim world.
