= Qari Ghulam Rasool =

Quran reciter and religious scholar (1935 - 2014)

Maulana, Qari Ghulam Rasool

Personal life
- Born: 1935 Lahore, British Raj
- Died: March 9, 2014 (aged 78–79) Lahore, Pakistan
- Education: Darul Uloom Hizbul Ahnaf
- Other name: Zeenat ul Qura

Religious life
- Religion: Islam
- Denomination: Ahlus-Sunnah wa’l-Jama’ah
- Jurisprudence: Hanafi

Muslim leader
- Influenced by: Qari Abul Malik
- Awards: Pride of Performance Award by the President of Pakistan (1985)

Qari Ghulam Rasool (1935 – 9 March 2014) was a Pakistani Qari and an Islamic scholar.

== Biography ==
He was born in 1935 in Salamatpura, Lahore, British India. He received education from famous seminary Darul Uloom Hizbul Ahnaf. He learned Qira'at from Qari Abdul Malik and later on became famous across the globe due to his unique recitation style.

He had recited the Quran at PTV and Radio Pakistan for more than 50 years. He also served as the 'designated qari' for the Provincial Assembly of the Punjab for some years.

He also taught at Jamia Nizamia and later on established his own five madaris. He was a close friend of Shah Ahmad Noorani and Abdul Sattar Khan Niazi of Jamiat Ulema-e-Pakistan party.

== Awards and recognition ==
- Pride of Performance Award by the President of Pakistan in 1985.

== Death ==
He died on 9 March 2014 in Lahore.
