= Banu Zayd =

Najdi tribe

Banu Zayd (Arabic: بنو زيد) is a tribe based in Shaqra of Najd.

== Notable people ==
Among the tribe's members are:

- Muhammad bin Abdul Karim Al-Issa, Saudi politician and Secretary General of the Muslim World League
- Saleh Abdul Aziz Al Rajhi, Saudi businessman, philanthropist, and one of the founders of Al-Rajhi Bank with his brothers
- Saud Al-Shuraim, One of the imams and preachers of the al-Masjid al-Haram.
- Bakr Abu Zayd, Saudi Muslim scholar
- Abdullah ibn Jibreen, Saudi Islamic jurist

== See also ==
- Tribes of Arabia
- Bani Zeid, Palestinian town in the Ramallah and al-Bireh Governorate
