= Shakir Qasmi =

Quran reciter of Pakistan

Qari Shakir Qasmi
- Born: September 1943; Deoband, Uttar Pradesh, British India
- Died: March 2023 (Aged 80); Ontario, Canada
- Occupation: Qari (a reciter of the Quran)
- Father: Qari Tahir Qasmi
- Relatives: Qari Zahir Qasmi (older brother) Qari Waheed Zafar Qasmi (younger brother)
- Awards: Pride of Performance Award by the Government of Pakistan in 1981 *Tamgha-i-Imtiaz (Medal of Excellence) Award by the President of Pakistan in 1979 *Pakistan Television (PTV) Award in 1980

Qari Shakir Qasmi (Urdu: قارى شاكر قاسمى) was a Pakistani Qāriʾ (a reciter of the Quran) known for his work on Radio Pakistan and Pakistan Television (PTV).

== Background ==
Qari Shakir Qasmi was born in Deoband to Maulana Qari Tahir Qasmi, son of Islamic scholar Hafiz Muhammad Ahmad, who was the son of Maulana Muhammad Qasim Nanautavi.

He later migrated to Karachi, Pakistan. He was a founding member and executive director of the International Quran Recitation Association (IQRA). From 1978 to 1985, he was the host of the children's television program Iqra (transl. read), which provided lessons and exercises on properly reciting and pronouncing Quranic Arabic. This program aired and re-ran on Pakistan Television Corporation (PTV). It was later hosted by Waheed Zafar Qasmi (his younger brother), and lateron by Qari Khushi Muhammad. He was the author of a famous book called Asan Qaida Dars-E-Qur'an, which came with audio tapes to help children recite the Quran with proper pronunciation. Qari Shakir Qasmi was also the first person to recite the Quran at the United Nations.

== Awards and recognition ==
- Tamgha-e-Imtiaz (Medal of Excellence) Award by the Government of Pakistan (1979)
- Pride of Performance Award by the Government of Pakistan (1981)
- Pakistan Television (PTV) Award in 1980

== Death ==
Qari Shakir Qasmi died in March 2023 in Canada at age 80.

== Publications ==
- Asan Qaida Dars-E-Qur'an
