= Qari Syed Sadaqat Ali =

Quran recitor

Qari Syed Sadaqat Ali Hafiz (Quran) HI SI PP
- قاری سید صداقت علی
- Born: Pakistan
- Occupation: Teaching Quran on Pakistani television (PTV Program AlQuran) since 1992
- Known for: Recitation from the Quran, Program AlQuran (The Quran) on PTV
- Title: Hafiz (Quran)
- Awards: See List in this article

Qari Syed Sadaqat Ali HI SI PP is a Pakistani qari. He is well known for his program AlQuran (The Quran) that was especially aimed to help children with their reading and pronunciation skills of the Quran.

The program, started in 1992, was a huge success on the Pakistan Television Corporation channel (PTV) and is being replayed and rerun even in 2025. He has been invited on BBC Radio 3 as a guest to share his experiences with the public there.

He is also one of the official Quran readers at the Provincial Assembly of the Punjab's inaugural parliamentary sessions.

One of his teachers was the renowned Abdul samad 'Abd us-Samad (1927 – 1988) of Egypt.

== Early life and career ==
Qari Syed Sadaqat Ali was born in Pakistan. Qari Sadaqat started participating in local and international qiraat competitions (recitation of Quran competitions) at a very early age. He first recited the Quran on Radio Pakistan in 1966. He has appeared in 200 contests and won many international Qiraat competitions.

== Awards and recognition ==
- Hilal-i-Imtiaz (Crescent of Excellence) Award by the President of Pakistan in 2020
- Sitara-i-Imtiaz (Star of Excellence) Award by the President of Pakistan in 2015
- Pride of Performance Award by the President of Pakistan
- Qari (reciter) for the Provincial Assembly of the Punjab
- PTV Award winner in 1998
- Chairman, Saut ul Qura International, Pakistan
- Qari (reciter) for both Pakistan Television Corporation & Radio Pakistan
- Member, Selection Board for Pakistan Broadcasting Corporation
- Member, Niqabat ul Qura, Republic of Egypt
- Pupil of Internationally famous Qari Abdul Basit 'Abd us-Samad of Egypt
- Represented Pakistan in World Qirat recitals in Malaysia, Saudi Arabia, Kuwait, United Arab Emirates, Iran, United Kingdom, United States of America and Europe
- Gained second position twice in International Husn-e-Qirat competitions held in Iran
- First Pakistani Qari ever to win first position in International Husn-e- Qirat competition held in Bangladesh
- Broadcasting Al-Quran programme from Pakistani television and Prime TV since 1992

== See also ==
- Quran
- Qirat
- Tajweed
- Iqra
