= Hassan Ali Kasi =

Imam and Certified Qur'an reciter

Imam Hassan Ali Kasi
- Born: November 8, 1999 (age 27); Quetta
- Known for: Quranic Reciter
- Website: hassanalikasi.com

Hassan Ali Kasi (born 1999, Pashto/Urdu: حسن علی کاسی) is a Qur'anic reciter and Qur'an memorizer from Quetta, Pakistan, currently serving as an Imam at The Prayer Center of Orland Park. Recently Hassan served as an Imam at Islamic Center of Wheaton, Illinois, United States of America.

== Biography ==
In 2021, Kasi won first place in a Quran recitation competition Siraj Al-Kabeer, held in Afghanistan.

Kasi was eight years old when he began to earn recognition for his memorization and Qira'at skills and memorized the Quran at early age. He learned Tajwid from his father and recitation styles from his uncle.

Kasi finished college in Quetta and later moved to Islamabad to continue Islamic studies at International Islamic University Islamabad.

== Awards and recognition ==
- 3rd position in Turkey International Holy Quran Competition 2013
- 1st position in Swat National Qiraat Competition 2013
- Dunya News 10 winners of Hayya Al As-Salawat Competition 2014
- 1st position in Bol TV Quran Competition 2017
- 4th position in Al-Kawthar 13th International Quran Competition 2020
- 1st position in International Holy Quran Recitation Competition Afghanistan 2021
- National Youth Award by the Minhaj Youth League as a High Achiever in the Field of Qira'at for representing Pakistan in the International Quran Recitation Competition 2021 held in Afghanistan.
- In 2021, he was awarded a shield and certificate by the president of the International Islamic University, as a high achievers of the year.
