= Zahir Qasmi =

Recitor of the Quran

Zafar Qasmi
- Born: 2 August 1922; Uttar Pradesh, British India
- Died: 4 September 1988 (Aged 66); Virginia, United States
- Occupation: Qari
- Relatives: Qari Waheed Zafar Qasmi (younger brother); Qari Shakir Qasmi (younger brother); Hafiz Muhammad Ahmad (grand-father)

Zahir Qasmi (Urdu: قاری ظاہر قاسمی 2 August 1922 – 4 September 1988) was a renowned qari (reciter of the Qur’an), known for his unique style of qira’at (Qur’an recitation).

He was born in Uttar Pradesh, British India, to Muhammad Tahir Qasmi, the son of Islamic scholar Hafiz Muhammad Ahmad, grandson of Maulana Qasim Nanautawi, who was one of the founders of Darul Uloom Deoband.

His children included Saud Qasmi, a film actor.

On the day of Pakistan’s independence, 14 August 1947, Zahir Qasmi recited the Qur’an on Radio Pakistan. In the early 1950s.he founded a Qira’at institution in Karachi called Darul-Quran, Jamia Qasima. He was secretary-general of the International Qur’an Recitation Association in 1966/1967 and attended international Qira’at conferences.

He died on 4 September 1988 in Virginia, United States. A road in Karachi is named Qari Zahir Qasmi Road after him.
