= Veve Zulfikar =

Veve Zulfikar Basyaiban
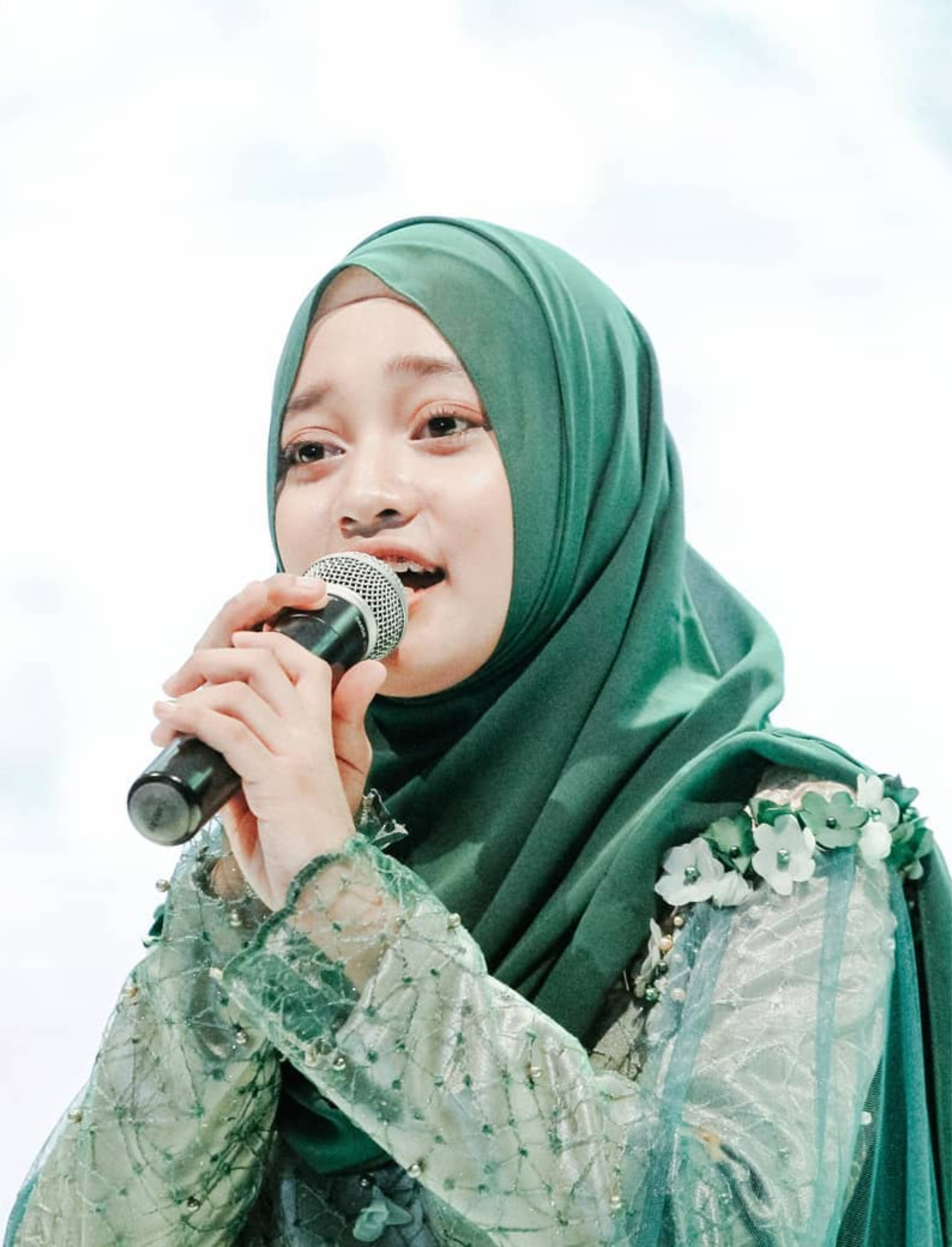
- Zulfikar performing in 2019
- Born: Veryal Eisha Aqila; 7 July 2003 (age 23); Jombang Regency, East Java, Indonesia
- Other name: Veve Zulfikar
- Occupations: Singer; qāriʾah; brand ambassador; actress; YouTuber
- Organization: Nahdlatul Ulama
- Awards: Santri of The Year 2018
- Musical career
- Genres: Salawat; nasheed; qasida
- Instruments: Vocals
- Label: Hilfa Music Entertainment
- Website: vevezulfikar.com

YouTube information
- Channel: VEVE ZULFIKAR
- Years active: 2016–present
- Genres: Cover song; music video; vlog
- Subscribers: 579,000
- Views: 53.1 million
- Last updated: 4 August 2026

Veryal Eisha Aqila Zulfikar Basyaiban or better known as Veve Zulfikar (born 7 July 2003) is an Indonesian religious singer, actress, and brand ambassador. In addition, she is also an Indonesian young qāriʾah (female reciter of the Quran) who is often invited to various provinces in Indonesia to recite verses of the Quran at various religious events. Since 8 October 2016, Veve Zulfikar joined YouTube and began uploading content as she recited the verses of the Quran, sang the salawat and qasida, also shared her daily activities (video blog). On 26 July 2017, Veve released her first single, entitled Sepercik Do'a Cinta, which was created by her father, Zulfikar Mohammad Basyaiban.

== Early life ==
Veve Zulfikar was born Veryal Eisha Aqila as the eldest child of five siblings from a married couple, Zulfikar Mohammad Basyaiban (or also known as Mohammad Miqdar Zulfikar or Zyal Fikar during his debut at Musabaqah Tilawatil Quran) and Riza Fitriya Zahro. Her three younger siblings included Zahwa Heyralva Zahra (Zara Zulfikar Basyaiban), Mohammad Haidar Ashraaf (Haidar Zulfikar Basyaiban), Avro Humaira (Maira Zulfikar Basyaiban), and Helwa Zulfikar Basyaiban. Her father was an international qāriʾ from Sidoarjo Regency, East Java, who founded the House of Tilawah Al-Qur'an since 2013, an educational institution for Islamic boarding schools that focuses on the study of the Quranic qira'at. Her grandfather, Habib Muhammad Rozi Syihab Basyaiban, is the founder and leader of the Pondok Pesantren Sabilun Najah Watukosek, an Islamic boarding school that teaches the Quranic science in Pasuruan Regency.

== Discography ==
=== Singles ===
- Sepercik Do'a Cinta (2017)
- Berakhir Indah (2018)
- Sholawat Burdah (2018)
- Sholawat Nahdliyah (2018)

== Filmography ==
=== Film ===
Title	Year	Role	Notes	Refs.
Lima Penjuru Masjid	2017	Her self	Special appearance as a guest star actress	
The Santri	2019	Unknown	Directed by Livi Zheng, in collaboration with the Executive Board of the Nahdlatul Ulama	
