= Mishari bin Rashid Alafasy =

Kuwaiti Qari (Reciter of the Qur'an)

Mishary bin Rashid Alafasy
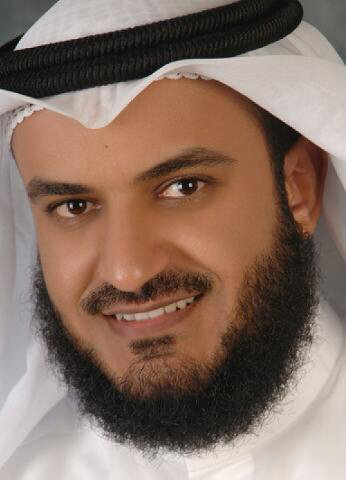

Background information
- Born: September 5, 1976 (age 50); Kuwait City, Kuwait
- Genres: Islamic, Nasheed, Hamd, Na'at
- Occupations: Qari, Imam
- Instrument: Vocals
- Years active: 1997–present
- Website: Alafasy.co

Qari Mishary bin Rashid Alafasy (Arabic: مشاري بن راشد العفاسي) is a Kuwaiti qāriʾ (Quran reciter), imam, preacher, and nasheed artist. He studied at the College of the Holy Quran at the Islamic University of Madinah, where he specialized in the ten qira'at (canonical methods of Quranic recitation) and tafsir (Quranic exegesis).

In addition to his Qur’anic recitation, Alafasy has released several nasheed albums. While he usually recites in Arabic, he has also recorded nasheeds in other languages, including Japanese, Turkish, English and French.

Mishary bin Rashid Alafasy is today one of the most well recognized voices in Nashid and Quran recitations, with his own YouTube channel having 11.6 million subscribers. For instance, 2 of his recorded Nashids have amassed more than 200 million views on YouTube, with 1 recitation of Surah Baqarah amassing nearly 100 million views. Dozens of his Nashids and Quran recitations alike have at least 10 million views on YouTube. His voice is almost always available on any commonly used Quran listening app. In August 2025, he launched his first official Qur’anic and prayer application, called Alafasy.

== Awards and recognition ==
On October 25 2008, Alafasy was awarded the first Arab Creativity Oscar by the Arab Creativity Union in Egypt. The event was sponsored by the Secretary-General of the Arab League, Amr Moussa as a recognition of Alafasy's role in promoting Islamic principles and teachings.

In 2012, he was named the best Quran reciter by About.com magazine as part of the Readers' Choice Awards.

In June 2024, he received a diamond button for reaching 10 million subscribers on YouTube.
