= Bandar Baleela =

Saudi Qari and Imam (born 1975)

Shaykh Bandar Bin Abdul Azeez Baleela
- بندر بن عبد العزيز بليلة
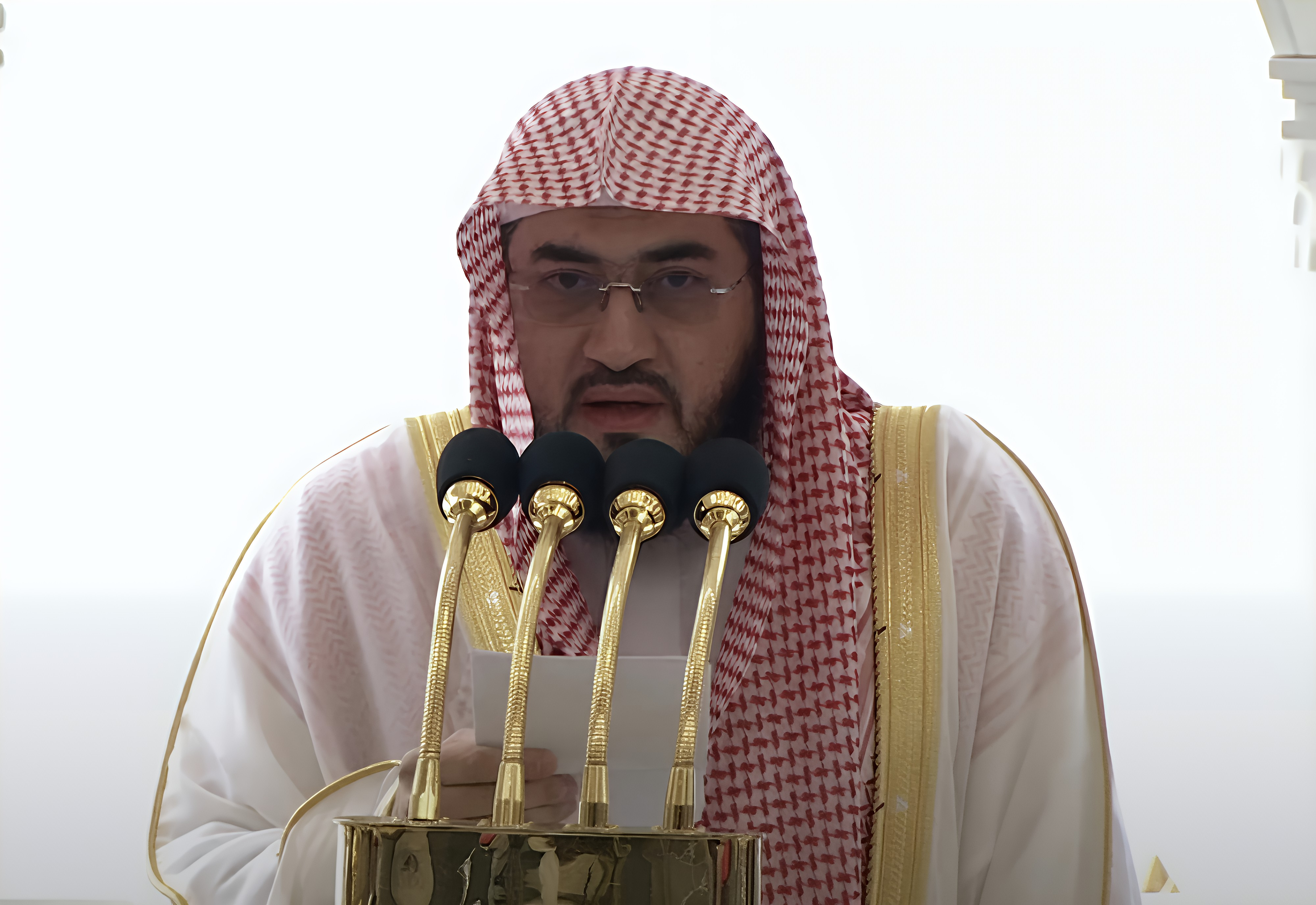

Imam and Khatib of Masjid al-Haram
- Incumbent
- Assumed office 2013

Member of Council of Senior Scholars
- Incumbent
- Assumed office 2020

Personal life
- Born: 1975 (age 50–51) Mecca, Saudi Arabia
- Education: Ph.D. (Islamic University of Madinah) Master's degree (Umm al-Qura University)
- Occupation: Imam, Khatib, Assistant professor

Religious life
- Religion: Islam
- Jurisprudence: Hanbali

Bandar Bin Abdul Azeez Baleela born in Mecca in 1975 (1395 in the Hijri Calendar) is a Saudi Islamic scholar, Qur'an reciter, member of the Council of Senior Scholars, and the imam and preacher of Masjid al-Haram.

== Life ==
=== Education ===
Baleela earned a bachelor's degree in Sharia from Umm al-Qura University in 1996. He completed a master's degree in Islamic jurisprudence from the same university in 2001. He obtained a Ph.D. in jurisprudence from the Islamic University of Madinah in 2008.

=== Career ===
Baleela worked as an associate teacher of Fiqh at the Academic Institute of the Masjid al-Haram in Mecca. He has authored several books and research papers related to this field. He has also worked as an assistant teacher in Al Taif University.

He was appointed to lead the Tarawih prayers during Ramadan nights at the Masjid al-Haram in 2013. Subsequently, in 2019, upon royal decree, he began delivering Friday sermons at the same location.

In addition, a royal decree was issued in October 2020 appointing Shaykh Baleelah as a member of the Council of Senior Scholars. He delivered the Arafah Sermon on 2021 and led Eid Al-Adha prayers on the same year. He was appointed in early 2026 as the Mufti of the Makkah Province
