= Yasir al-Dawsari =

Saudi Islamic scholar (born 1980,Al-Kharj)

Shaykh Yasir al-Dawsari
- ياسر الدوسري
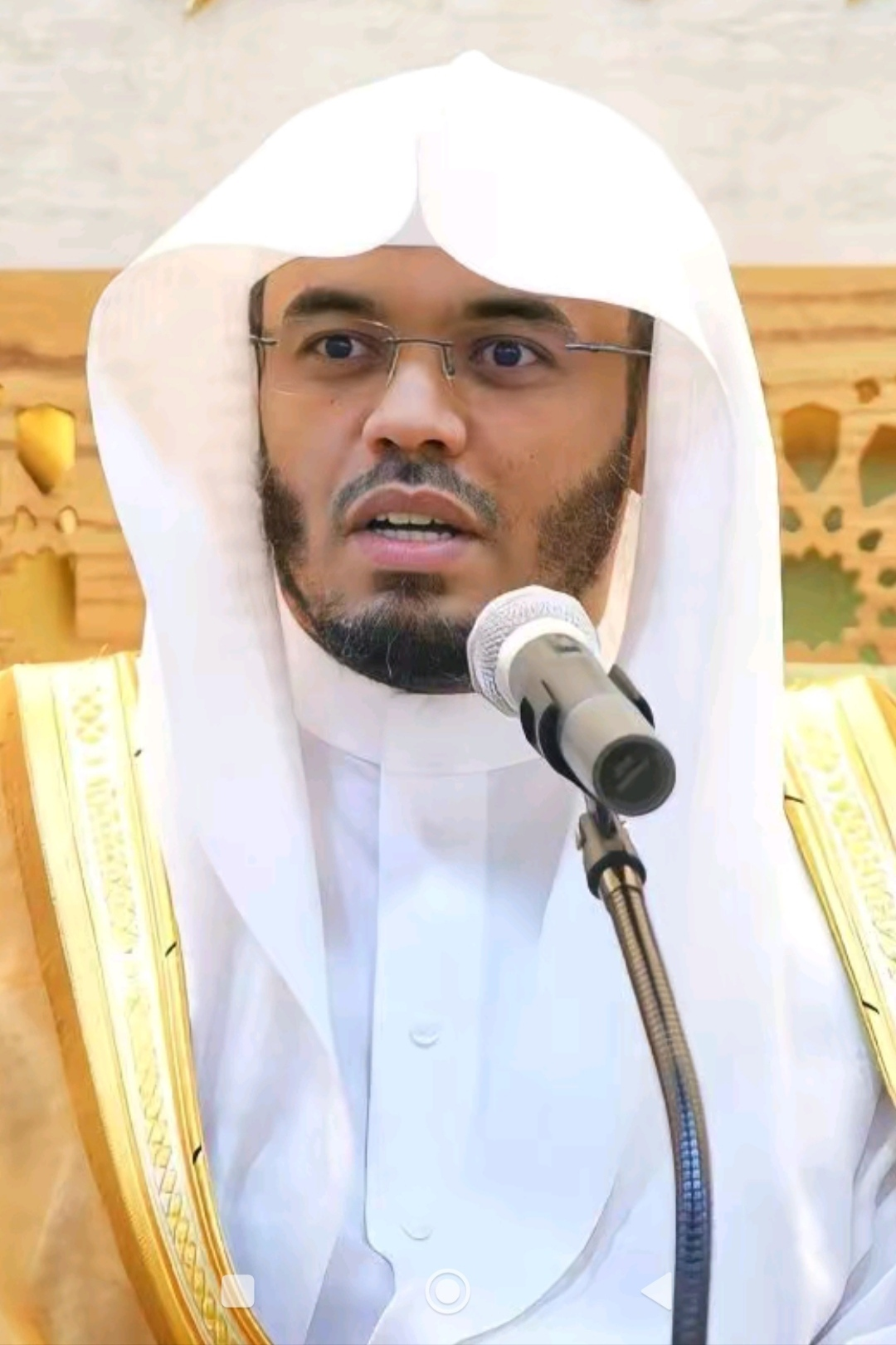
- Born: 8 October 1980 (age 46); Al-Kharj, Saudi Arabia
- Education: Imam Mohammad Ibn Saud Islamic University
- Occupations: Imam, Khatib, adviser, professor

Imam of Masjid al-Haram
- Incumbent
- Assumed office March 2024 (second term)
- In office 12 October 2019 – 8 October 2023 (first term)

Religious life
- Religion: Islam
- Jurisprudence: Hanbali

Yasir bin Rashid al-Dawsari (Note: Arabic: ياسر بن راشد الدوسري, romanized: Yāsir bin Rāshid al-Dawsarī. Full name: Arabic: ياسر بن الراشد بن حسين الودعاني الدوسري, romanized: Yasir bin Rashid bin Husayn al-Wad'ani al-Dawsari) (born 6 August 1980) is a Saudi Islamic scholar who has served as one of the imams of Masjid al-Haram since 2019. A khatib and qāriʾ, he led Tarawih and Tahajjud prayers at Masjid al-Haram from 2015 during Ramadan and also served as the imam of several mosques in Riyadh since 1995.

== Early life and education ==
Al-Dawsari was born in the Saudi governorate of al-Kharj, southeast of the capital, Riyadh. Al-Dawsari was a student of a group of scholars, including Abd al-Aziz Al al-Shaykh, Salih al-Fawzan, and Ibn Jibrin. He also learned qira'at under several teachers and reciters, including Bakri al-Tarabichi and Ibrahim al-Akhdar.

== Career ==
=== Masjid al-Haram ===
On 15 June 2015, (Note: 29 Sha'ban 1436 AH) al-Dawsari was appointed as a guest imam to lead tarawih and tahajjud at Masjid al-Haram during Ramadan, by the royal decree of King Salman. On 12 October 2019 (Note: 13 Safar 1441 AH), he was appointed as a permanent imam. Believed to be the youngest serving imam of Masjid al-Haram, he led his first prayer during the Maghrib and Isha prayers on 13 October 2019. In December 2022, al-Dawsari was also appointed as a khatib of Masjid al-Haram with King Salman's approval.

In 2020, al-Dawsari also appointed as an adviser to General Presidency of Haramain, after Abdul-Rahman Al-Sudais, President of the Affairs of the Haramain, reorganized the ranks of the advisory body of the government agency.

In October 2023, al-Dawsari was excused from the post after his four-year term ended. Many called for his return, with an online survey showing that 94% of respondents wished to see him reinstated as imam.

=== Second contract ===
In March 2023, al-Sudais announced the re-appointment of Yasir al-Dawsari as an imam of Masjid al-Haram, starting from Ramadan 1445 (2024).
