= Rubina Khalid (qaria) =

Quran reciter of Pakistan (1959 - 2017)

Rubina Khalid (1959 – 23 December 2017) was a Pakistani Quran reciter.

In 1996, she received the Pride of Performance award in Qirat from the President of Pakistan.

== Early life and career ==
She was born in 1959, to Chaudhry Khushi Mohammad, who was a 'close associate' of Maulana Zafar Ali Khan. Her father also owned a business called Punjab Press that used to print many newspapers. She did her master's degree in Arabic from the University of the Punjab in 1987. She had memorized the Qura'n and achieved proficiency in Qirat by the time she was nine years old.

Rubina taught as an Assistant Professor of Arabic at Kinnaird College for Women, Lahore and Government Islamia College, Lahore for 37 years. She first started appearing on the PTV in 1971 to recite the Quran. She was married to a college professor Khalid Mahmood Hashmi and had two daughters, Namrah and Arooba.

Qari Abdul Basit 'Abd us-Samad (1927 - 1988) of Egypt, (an international Quran-reciting celebrity) had heard her reciting the Quran at the historic Badshahi Masjid, Lahore, "and affectionately called the 12-year-old Rubina as 'Chhota Basit' (the second Basit)".

== Death ==
Rubina Khalid died on 23 December 2017 after a long battle with cancer at the age of 58. She is survived by her husband and their two daughters. She was buried at the Miani Sahib Graveyard in Lahore.
