= Muhammad Rifat =

Egyptian Quran reciter (1882–1950)

Shaykh al-Maqari Muhammad Rif'at
- محمد رفعت
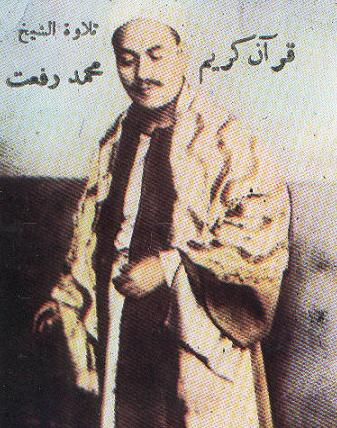
- Born: 9 May 1882; Cairo, Khedivate of Egypt
- Died: 9 May 1950 (aged 68); Cairo, Egypt
- Occupation: Qari
- Known for: First Qari to recite on Egyptian radio

Religious life
- Religion: Islam
- Denomination: Sunni
- Tariqa: Naqshbandi

Muhammad bin Mahmud Rif'at (Note: Arabic: محمد بن محمود رفعت) (9 May 1882 – 9 May 1950) was an Egyptian Quran reciter known for his radio broadcasts and his contribution to the development of recorded Quranic recitation in Egypt. He was the first to recite the Quran on Egyptian Radio in 1934. He became known by the epithet Qitharat al-Sama (Note: Arabic: قيثارة السماء) ("Harp of Heaven").

Rif'at lost his sight during early childhood and memorized the Quran under the instruction of traditional Quran teachers. He regularly recited at Fadil Pasha Mosque in Cairo and developed a distinctive style characterized by attention to pronunciation, melodic phrasing, and the expression of Quranic meaning. A throat illness made him to stop reciting publicly in 1943. he died in Cairo in 1950 and was buried near Al-Sayyida Nafisa Mosque.

== Early life and education ==
Muhammad Rif'at was born on 9 May 1882 in the Darb al-Aghawat area of the al-Maghreblin neighbourhood in Cairo, Egypt. He lost his sight in early childhood due to Conjunctivitis. His father, Mahmud Rif'at, worked in the police service and encouraged his son's Quranic education.

At the age of five, Rif'at was enrolled in a kuttab, atraditional elementary school for Quranic instruction, associated with Mustafa Fadil Pasha Mosque in Cairo. His first teacher was Muhammad Hamida, under whose instruction he memorized the Quran and studied religious material.

Rif'at later studied qira'at (methods of Quran recitation) and tajwid (rules of pronunciation under Abd al-Fattah al-Hinidi. He received ijazah (authorization) to recite according to his studies.

His father died when Rif'at was approximately nine years old. In his teen years He began reciting at religious gatherings in Cairo and was invited to perform in other parts of Egypt.

== Career ==
=== Recitation at Fadil Pasha Mosque ===
In 1918, Rif'at became the Quran reciter at Fadil Pasha Mosque in Cario's Sayyidah Zainab district. His performances attracted listeners from different social backgrounds, and his reputation extended beyond the neighbourhood. Among those reported to have attended or listened to his recitations were prominent Egyptian political and public figures, including King Farouk and prime minister Mostafa el-Nahas

=== Egyptian radio broadcasts ===
Muhammad Rif'at photographed at the Egyptian Radio microphone in 1930s.

On 31 May 1934, Egyptian national radio began broadcasting, with Rif'at reciting verses from the Quran. His broadcast is widely identified with the inauguration of regular Quran recitation on Egyptian radio.

Rif'at was also reportedly approached by foreign broadcasters. The BBC Arabic Service requested recordings of his recitation. he initially refused because of religious concerns about broadcasting the Quran. He sought the opinion of Muhammad Mustafa al-Maraghi, the then-grand Imam of al-Azhar, who advised him that the proposed recording was permissible. Rif'at then recorded Surah Maryam for the broadcaster.

== Personal life ==
Rif'at married Zaynab, who came from the Monufia Governorate of Egypt. They had four children: Muhammad, Ahmad, Bahiyya, and Husayn.

His eldest son, Muhammad, assisted him with the management of his professional affairs. His son Ahmad also studied Quran recitation and obtained ijazah in the field.

Rif'at is described as a follower of the Naqshbandi Sufi tradition.

== Illness and death ==
In 1943, Rif'at developed a throat condition that interfered with his ability to recite. The illness progressively prevented him from continuing his public performances. Accounts of his final years state that he spent his savings on treatment and declined some offers of financial assistance, saying "A reciter of Quran must not be humiliated."

=== Death ===
Rif'at died on 9 May 1950, his sixty-eighth birthday. He was buried in a cemetery near Al-Sayyida Nafisa Mosque in Cairo, in accordance with his reported wish to be buried in the vicinity.

== Legacy ==
Rif'at is regarded as an important figure in connection with the introduction of Quran broadcasts on national radio in Egypt. The epithet Qitharat al-Sama (Note: Arabic: قيثارة السماء) ("Harp of Heaven"). became closely associated with his name.

=== Preservation of his recitations ===
Early radio technology imposed limitations on the recording and storage of lengthy broadcasts, due to which many of Rif'at's live broadcasts were not recorded by Egyptian radio. however, a significant portion was preserved on gramophones by an admirer, Zakariyya Pasha Mahran, and later restored and distributed by contribution by Rif'at's family.

In December 2025, Al-Azhar announced an initiative to restore rare and unreleased recordings of Rif'at as part of broader preservation efforts for prominent Quran reciters.

== See also ==
- Muhammad Rashad al-Sharif

== Other sources ==
- Saifulla, M S M & Muhammad Ghoniem. September 27, 2001. Biographies Of Some Professional Reciters Of The Qur'ân From Egypt Islamic Awareness. Accessed August 23, 2007.
- Sheikh Mohammed Rifa¹at 'Master' of the Holy Qur¹an Reciters May 10, 2000. Accessed August 23, 2007.
