= Saud Al-Shuraim =

Former Imam of Masjid al-Haram

Shaykh Saud al-Shuraim
- سعود بن ابراهيم الشريم
- Saud al-Shuraim in 2012 in Delhi
- Born: January 19, 1966 (age 60); Riyadh, Saudi Arabia
- Education: Umm al-Qura University (PhD in Sharia)

Imam and Khatib of Masjid al-Haram
- In office 1991–2022

Personal life
- Main interest: Fiqh

Religious life
- Religion: Islam
- Denomination: Sunni
- Lineage: Banu Zayd
- Jurisprudence: Hanbali
- Creed: Athari
- Movement: Salafism
- Saud Al-Shuraims' voice Reciting the Throne Verse

Saud ibn Ibrahim ibn Muhammad al-Shuraim (Note: Arabic: سعود بن ابراهيم بن محمد الشريم) (born 19 January 1966), is a Saudi Quran reciter, Islamic scholar, and former imam and khatib (Friday preacher) of the Masjid al-Haram in Mecca. He obtained a PhD in Islamic jurisprudence from Umm al-Qura University, and was appointed as dean and specialist professor in Fiqh at University Bakri bin Ma'tooq.

Shuraim used to always lead the Tarawih prayers during the month of Ramadan at Masjid al-Haram beginning in 1991. On 17 June 2012, he also led the funeral prayer for Crown Prince Nayef bin Abdulaziz at the mosque following the Maghrib (sunset) prayer, an event attended by King Abdullah and members of the Saudi royal family.

== Personal life ==
Shuraim was born on 19 January 1966 in Riyadh, Saudi Arabia. His family is from the Haraqees of the Banu Zayd tribe of Saudi Arabia.

In an interview with the Al Watan newspaper, when asked about his wife's role in his success, Shuraim stated:

Before I say something about my wife, I can't forget my mother's love and mercy for me in my childhood and youth as well; As she raised me in orphanage in childhood... her love is a tonic for me. May Allah shower His mercy upon her as she did with me when I was a child.
And as for my wife, she has proven herself to be the best companion for me in happiness and sorrow, she is there when I need her, cheers me up, and tries her best to lighten my sorrows. May Allah include this in her good deeds.

== Education ==
Al-Shuraim received his early education in Riyadh, where he attended Areen Elementary School, the Model Intermediate School, and Al-Yarmouk Secondary School. During his late teenage years in the 1980s, he memorized the Quran in approximately six months, reportedly without formal instruction.

=== Higher education ===
In 1984, he enrolled in the Department of Islamic Creed and Contemporary Doctrines at the College of Fundamentals of Religion, Imam Muhammad ibn Saud Islamic University, from which he graduated with a bachelor’s degree in 1988. He continued his studies at the Supreme Judicial Institute of the same university, obtaining a master’s degree in comparative jurisprudence in 1992.

=== Doctorate and academic career ===
In 1995, Al-Shuraim earned a PhD in Islamic jurisprudence from Umm al-Qura University in Mecca for his thesis on Imam Abu Mansur al-Kirmani’s book Paths in the Rituals. After completing his doctorate, he joined Umm al-Qura University as a lecturer, later becoming vice dean of the Faculty of Sharia. He remained in academic service until his retirement in 2022.

== Career ==
In 1991, he was made a prayer leader and Friday preacher at the Grand Mosque by the order of King Fahd. A year after that, he was appointed judge in the High court of Makkah. Further to this, he was approved and made to teach in the Holy Masjid al-Haram. He has been serving as a professor at the Umm al-Qura University in Mecca since 1995, and has been named the dean of the faculty of "Shari'ah and Islamic Studies". In June 2010, he was promoted from the rank of professor to the specialist professor in fiqh by the president of the university Bakri bin Mat'ooq. He is currently retired.

On 6 April 2018, Saudi authorities closed Sheikh Shuraim’s twitter page because he had posted comments about political and social issues in the Kingdom and criticised what he believed are violations of Islamic teachings.

=== Works ===
Saud al-Shuraim produced a range of written work, including poetry as well as studies in Islamic heritage and scholarship. He is credited with authoring around fifteen volumes on topics such as Aqidah (creed), Fiqh (jurisprudence), the rituals of Hajj and Umrah, collections of his sermons, and other areas of Islamic law.

=== Travels ===
During his tenure as imam of the Masjid al-Haram, al-Shuraim undertook a number of international visits. His travels included Britain in 1999, the United Arab Emirates in 1997 and 2001, Indonesia in 2002, 2008, and 2011, as well as multiple visits to India between 2010 and 2012.

=== Retirement ===
After serving for 32 years at the Masjid al-Haram, al-Shuraim stepped down from his position as imam in 2022. He marked the occasion with a farewell poem of his own composition. His final prayer in the role was the Maghrib prayer on October 8, 2022 (corresponding to 12 Rabi' al-Awwal 1444).
