= Taha el-Fashni =

Egyptian Quran reciter and religious chanter (1900–1971)

Shaykh Taha el-Fashni
- طه الفشني
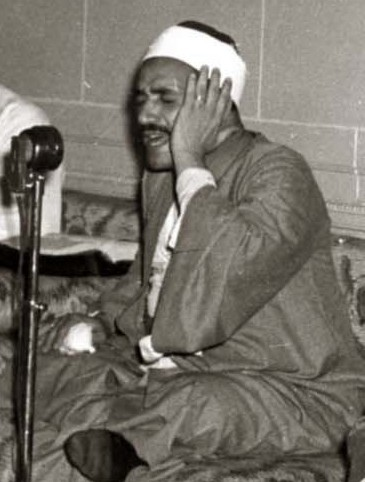
- Born: Taha Hassan Morsi; 1900; El Fashn, Beni Suef Governorate, Khedivate of Egypt
- Died: 10 December 1971 (aged 70–71); Heliopolis, Cairo
- Education: Teachers' Training School, Minya; Qira'at in an Institute affiliated with Al-Azhar University

Personal life
- Known for: Quran recitation and religious chanting
- Influenced by: Ali Mahmud

Religious life
- Religion: Islam

Taha Hassan Morsi el-Fashni (Note: Arabic: طه حسن مرسي الفشني, romanized: Taha Hassan Morsi al-Fashni) (1900 – 10 December 1971) was an Egyptian Quran reciter and religious chanter (munshid). He was known for his Quran recitations, religious hymns (tawashih) and Islamic supplications (ibtihalat). He joined Egyptian Radio in 1937 and became one of its recognised reciters and religious chanter. He also served as a reciter in the Mosque of Sayyida Sukayna and performed at royal palaces of Egypt.

== Early life and education ==
Taha el-Fashni was born in 1900 in El Fashn, in Beni Suef Governorate, Egypt. He attended a traditional Quran school (kuttab) in his hometown, where he memorised the Quran between 10 and 15 years of age. He then attended a teachers' training school in Minya, and obtained a teaching qualification in 1919.

He moved to Cairo during the 1919 Egyptian revolution, initially intending to pursue further studies, including religious law. However, the political circumstances led him to return temporarily to his hometown. He began reciting the Quran at religious gatherings and local events.

He later returned to Cairo and studied Quranic recitation and rules of tajwid at an institution affiliated with Al-Azhar. He studied under Abdel Aziz el-Sahhar and received instruction in the ten canonical Quranic readings. During this period, he became associated with Ali Mahmud, a prominent Egyptian religious chanter, and joined his circle of religious chanters.

== Career ==
=== Egyptian Radio ===
El-Fashni joined Egyptian Radio in 1937, after performing at a religious gathering at Al-Hussein Mosque in Cairo. His performance attracted the attention of Said Lotfi, the director of Egyptian Radio at the time, who invited him to audition. El-Fashni passed the required tests and was approved as a radio reciter.

He became the third officially recognised Quran reciter at the station, following Muhammad Rifat and Abdel Fattah el-Sha'sha'i. He was among the few performers in the Egyptian Radio to work both as a Quran reciter and a religious chanter. His voice became particularly associated with Ramadan broadcasts, including his recitation before iftar and supplications before the dawn (fajr) prayer.

=== Religious chanting and recitation ===
El-Fashni formed his own religious chanting ensemble in 1942, while continuing his word as a Quran reciter. His performances included tawashih, religious hymns and ibtihalat. He became known for his use of Arabic melody modes (maqamat) in religious performances.

He worked with composers including Zakariyya Ahmad and Mohammed Abdel Wahab, who composed religious works performed by him. Among the religious chants associated with him are "Ya Ayyuha al-Mukhtar", "Milad Taha", "Hubb al-Hussein" and "Ilahi". One of his best known supplications was "Al-Salam Alayka Ya Shahr al-Siyam", which became associated with the farewell to Ramadan in Egypt.

=== Other Appointments ===
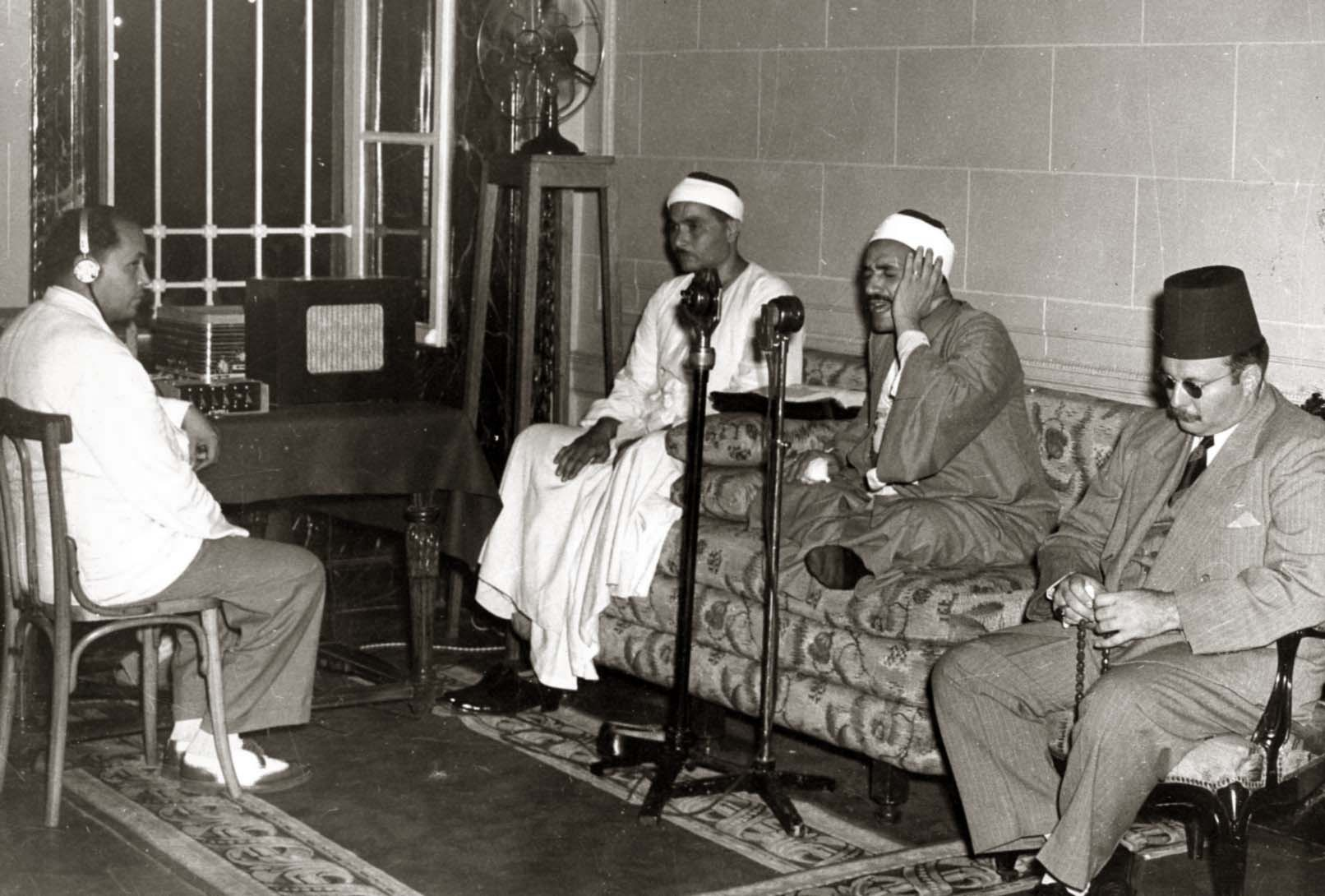
Taha el-Fashni reciting the Quran in the microphone in Abdeen Palace, in presence of King Farouk (right) and Mustafa Ismail (center; dressed in white)

In 1940, El-Fashni was appointed as a Quran reciter at the Mosque of Sayyida Sukayna in Cairo, a position he held until his death. He also served as a muezzin (caller to prayer) at Al-Hussein Mosque in Cairo.

From 1943 to 1952, during the reign of King Farouk, he performed Quran recitations during Ramadan gatherings at Abdeen Palace in Cairo and Ras El Tin Palace in Alexandria, alongside Mustafa Ismail.

He was also among the early Quran reciters to appear on Egyptian television after its launch in 1960. In 1962, El-Fashni was selected as head of the Readers' Association, succeeding Abdel Fattah el-Sha'sha'i.

El-Fashni also travelled to several Arab and Muslim countries for religious performances and cultural visits, ncluding Saudi Arabia, Pakistan, Turkey, Malaysia, Tunisia, Morocco, Libya, Sudan, and Syria. He also received state recognition in the under Egyptian president Gamal Abdel Nasser and later during the presidency of Anwar Sadat.

== Illness and death ==
In the later years of his life, El-Fashni experienced health problems. According to his son, Zain el-Fashni, he suffered a stroke in 1969, which limited his participation in public performance.

Taha el-Fashni died on 10 December 1971, at the age of 71, in Heliopolis, Cairo. His funeral procession began at Al-Hussein Mosque in Cairo, and he was buried in the family cemetery.

== Legacy ==
El-Fashni left behind a collection of Quran recordings, religious hymns and suuplications. According to his son, he left approximately 286 Quranic recordings and around 14 hours of religious supplications and chants.

His recordings continued to be broadcast on Egyptian radio and religious television channels, particularly during Ramadan. In 1991, he was posthumously awarded the Order of Merit, First Class. A street in Nasr City, Cairo, was named after him.

His personal belongings and archival materials are displayed in the Quran Reciters' Museum, part of Dar al-Quran at the Islamic Cultural Center in Egypt's New Administrative Capital. The collections includes clothing, personal objects, photographs and recordings documenting his career. The Museum also displays items associated with Quran reciters including Muhammad Rifat, Mustafa Ismail, al-Husary, al-Minshawi, and Abdul Basit, among others.
