= Shahat Muhammad Anwar =

Egyptian Quran reciter (1950–2008)

Shaykh al-Qari El-Shahat Muhammad Anwar
- الشحات محمد أنور
- Born: July 1, 1950; Kafr el-Wazir, Mit Ghamr, Dakahlia Governorate, Egypt
- Died: January 13, 2008 (aged 57); Kafr el-Wazir, Mit Ghamr, Dakahlia Governorate, Egypt
- Board member of: Syndicate of Quran Reciters in Egypt
- Children: 9; including Anwar and Mahmoud

Religious life
- Religion: Islam
- Denomination: Sunni

El-Shahat Muhammad Anwar (Note: Arabic: الشحات محمد أنور; pronounced as Ash-Shahāt Muhammad Anwar) (1 July 1950 – 13 January 2008) was an Egyptian qāri (Quran reciter). He was among the prominent Egyptian reciters of his generation and was known for his melodic recitation style. El-Shahat was approved as a reciter for Egyptian Radio in 1979 and performed at religious events in Egypt and abroad. He served as secretary-general of the Egyptian Syndicate of Quran reciters until his death. He was also known by the nickname Amīr al-Nagham (Note: Arabic: أمير النغم) (Prince of Melodies).

== Early life and education ==
El-Shahat Muhammad Anwar was born on 1 July 1950 in the village of Kafr el-Wazir, in Mit Ghamr, Dakahlia Governorate, Egypt. His father died approximately three months after his birth, and he was subsequently raised under his maternal uncle, Helmy Mustafa, who supervised his upbringing and Quranic education.

El-Shahat memorised the Quran at the age of eight under his uncle's guidance. He then studied the rules of Quranic recitation (tajwid) under Ali Sayed el-Faragi. His recitation skills at a young age earned him the nickname al-Sheikh al-Saghir (the Little Sheikh) among his peers and the residents of his village.

== Career ==
=== Egyptian Radio ===
El-Shahat's reputation as a Quran reciter grew during his youth, and he began receiving invitations to recite at religious gatherings across Egypt. He first applied to join Egyptian Radio in 1976. Following an audition, the examination committee recommended that he receive further training in melodic variation before being reconsidered. He then studied maqamat (Arabic melodic modes) for approximately two years.

El-Shahat appeared before the radio's examination committee again in 1979 and was approved as a Quran reciter. On 16 December 1979, he recited during a live dawn broadcast on Quran Radio, introducing his recitation to a wider audience.

He subsequently recorded the Quran in the murattal style, a form of measured recitation. The recitation was approved by the Islamic Research Academy at Al-Azhar.

=== Syndicate ===
In the early 1980s, el-Shahat participated in the establishment of the Egyptian Syndicate of Memorizers and Reciters of the Noble Quran, alongside reciters including Abdul Basit 'Abd us-Samad and Mahmud Ali al-Banna. He served on its first board of directors and later became its secretary-general, a position he held until his death.

=== Public appearances and competitions ===
In 1994, el-Shahat recited the Quran at a Mawlid celebration in Alexandria. The event was attended by Egyptian president Hosni Mubarak. He also participated in Laylat al-Qadr celebrations attended by Hosni Mubarak in 1997 and 2001.

In 2003, he co-established an international Quran memorisation competition in Port Said. The 7th edition of competition, held in 2024, was named after him in recognition of his contributions to Quranic recitation.

He also established Al-Taqwa Mosque in his home village of Kafr el-Wazir.

== Recitation style ==
El-Shahat's recitation was characterised by the use of different maqamat and variations in vocal delivery. Although, he studied melodic techniques as part of his training but he reportedly maintained that Quran recitation should be distinguished from music. He reportedly also emphasised the importance of taqwa (God-consciousness) in recitation.

His recitations have been described as having included both melancholic and relatively uplifting melodic passages. his approach was sometime contrasted with that of earlier Egyptian reciters such as whose recitations were often associated with mostly melancholic style.

== International travels ==
El-Shahat performed in several countries through invitations and assignments from Egyptians Ministry of Endowments. In 1980, he travelled to Saudi Arabia to perform Hajj pilgrimage. He also participated in Ramadan programmes and religious gatherings in Lebanon and Iran.

His international engagements included visits to United Kingdom, United States, Argentina, Spain, Austria, France, Brazil, Nigeria, Tanzania, Maldives, Comoros, Zaire, and Cameroon, as well as countries in the Gulf region and elsewhere in Asia. He also recited at Islamic centres in London and Los Angeles.

In 2001, el-Shahat won first place in King Faisal International competition, (Note: The Egyptian media reports refers to the competition as the King Faisal International Competition, although it may have been the King Abdulaziz International Competition for Memorizing, Reciting, and Interpreting the Holy Quran. The exact identity of the competition remains unclear.) in which he competed against Quran reciters from across the Islamic world.

== Personal life ==
El-Shahat had nine children, three sons and six daughters. Two of his sons, Anwar and Mahmoud el-Shahat Anwar, memorised the Quran and became reciters. His son Mahmoud el-Shahat Anwar subsequently gained recognition for his Quran recitation.

El-Shahat Muhammad's son, Mahmoud el-Shahat Anwar in Iran in 2015

== Death and legacy ==
El-Shahat Muhammad Anwar died on 13 January 2008 in Kafr el-Wazir, aged 57.

He left behind numerous audio and video recordings of his recitations, which continue to be circulated among Quran listeners. His son Mahmoud el-Shahat Anwar has also continued the family's involvement in Quran recitation.

In December 2025, the Egyptian Ministry of Endowments dedicated the 32nd edition of its International Holy Quran Competition to el-Shahat. The event was held in Egypt's New Administrative Capital and included participants from several countries.
