= Mahmoud Shahat Anwar =

Egyptian Quran reciter (born 1984)

- محمود الشحات أنور
- Anwar in 2015
- Born: 10 September 1984 (age 42); Mit Ghamr, Dakahlia Governorate, Egypt
- Occupation: Quran reciter
- Father: Shahat Muhammad Anwar

Mahmoud el-Shahat Anwar (Note: Arabic: محمود الشحات أنور) (born 10 September 1984) is an Egyptian Quran reciter and the son of reciter Shahat Muhammad Anwar. He is known for his Quran recitations in Egypt and has travelled internationally to participate in religious events and Quran competition in several countries.

== Early life and education ==
Mahmoud Shahat Anwar was born on 10 September 1984 in the village of Kafr el-Wazir in Mit Ghamr, Dakahlia Governorate, Egypt. He began learning Quran recitation from his father, Shahat Anwar, and memorised the entire Quran by the age of 12. In 1997, at the age of 13, he participated in a competition held on Laylat al-Qadr, where he obtained first place and was selected to reciter before Egyptian president Hosni Mubarak.

Anwar studied at an Al-Azhar religious institute and later attended the Faculty of Islamic Studies at Al-Azhar University in Cairo.

== Career and travels ==
Mahmoud Shahat Anwar in the International Quran Competition in Iran in September 2008

Anwar began travelling abroad for Quran recitation in 2004. He has visited countries in Africa, Asia, Europe, and the Middle East, participating in religious gatherings and Quran competitions, as well as to participate as a judge.

In September 2008, he visited Iran to participate in an International Quran Competition. In November 2015, he visited Iran again to participate in a Quran gathering in Abadan, Iran.

In September 2022, Anwar visited Islamabad, Pakistan, after an invitation from the Prime Minister Shehbaz Sharif. In March 2023, he was invited to Bahrain for a Quranic evening organised by the Al-Hamala Cultural, Charitable and Social Association in Manama.

In 2025, Anwar recited verses from Surah An-Nisa at the swearing-in ceremony for newly appointed members of the Public Prosecution. Held in the New Administrative Capital of Egypt. In December 2025, Anwar recited at the 32nd edition of its International Holy Quran Competition which was named after his father by the Egyptian Ministry of Endowments. The event was held in the New Administrative Capital and included participants from several countries.

In March 2026, Anwar attended a presidential iftar gathering in Turkey after an invitation from Turkish president Recep Tayyip Erdoğan. He recited verses from the Quran during the event.

Anwar also operates a YouTube channel featuring his Quran recitations. in 2021, he stated that the revenue from his online platforms was allocated to a charitable association established by him and his brothers.

== Views and controversies ==
In 2019 interview, Anwar supported qualification tests for Quran reciters by the Egyptian Syndicate of Quran Reciters. He also stated that imitation of established reciters could help beginners but the reciters should eventually develop their own styles. Regarding melodic modes (Arabic maqamat) in Quran recitation, he said they could be used to improve vocal performance as long as they did not affect the rules of recitation or the meaning of the verses.

In 2021, The Syndicate of Quran Reciters referred Anwar to its ethics committee and summoned him for an investigation after he had made statements about a dream involving an ascent to heaven and perceived encounter with God. The syndicate annouced that the matter would be examined with the participation of specialists in Islamic theology from Al-Azhar University.

In 2025, Anwar became the subject of a public dispute concerning an alleged cancellation of a Quran recitation engagement at a funeral gathering in Sharqia Governorate. A man claimed that Anwar had agreed to recite for 120,000 Egyptian pounds but later accepted another engagement in Mansoura for 150,000 pounds. Anwar's lawyer disputed the claim, stating that the cancellation arose after the other party allegedly requested a commission from Anwar's manager. The incident received media coverage and renewed discussion about the fees charged by Quran reciters at the funerals.
