= Mohamed Mahmoud al-Tablawi =

Egyptian Quran reciter (1934–2020)

Shaykh al-Qari Mohamed Mahmoud al-Tablawi
- محمد محمود الطبلاوي
- Born: November 14, 1934; Giza Governorate, Kingdom of Egypt
- Died: May 5, 2020 (aged 85); Agouza, Giza, Egypt
- Resting place: Cairo
- Occupation: Quran reciter

Head of Syndicate of Quran Reciters
- In office 2011–2020
- Preceded by: Abul Ainain Shuaisha
- Succeeded by: Mohamed Saleh Hashad

Religious life
- Religion: Islam
- Denomination: Sunni

Mohamed Mahmoud al-Tablawi (Note: Arabic: محمد محمود الطبلاوي) (14 November 1934 – 5 May 2020) was an Egyptian Quran reciter who served as head of the Egyptian Syndicate of Quran Reciters. He performed at religious ceremonies in Egypt and abroad, recorded recitations in several canonical Quranic recitation, and served as a judge in international Quran competitions.

== Early life and education ==
Al-Tablawi was born on 14 November 1934 in Mit Oqba, Giza Governorate, Kingdom of Egypt. His family originated from the governorates of Sharqia and Monufia. He memorised the Quran by the age of nine, studying under several teachers.

He began reciting at Quran gatherings at the age of twelve and was invited to perform at mourning ceremonies held by prominent families and senior officials.

== Career ==
Al-Tablawi became a professional Quran reciter at the age of fifteen. He performed at major religious ceremonies, including events attended by Egyptian presidents.

His recitation was noted for its vocal modulation and breath control. He recorded the Quran in several canonical readings (qira'at). He served as a reciter at Al-Azhar Mosque. In 2011, he was elected the head of Egyptian Syndicate of Quran Reciters, succeeding Abu el-Enein Shaisha. He held the latter position until his death. He retired from professional recitation at the age of 84.

=== International travels ===
Throughout his career, al-Tablawi travelled to several countries in Europe and Asia. He participated as a judge in international Quran competitions and performed at religious gatherings abroad. During a visit to Saudi Arabia, he entered the Kaaba at the invitation of King Khalid bin Abdulaziz and recited Quran there.

== Death ==
Al-Tablawi died on 5 May 2020, (Note: corresponding to 12 Ramadan 1441 AH) at the age of 85, following an illness.

His funeral took place on 6 May at the family cemetery in Al-Basatin, southern Cairo. Due to restrictions imposed during COVID-19 pandemic, the funeral was limited to family members and representatives of the reciters'.

Following his death, Grand Imam of Al-Azhar Ahmed el-Tayeb described him as a significant figure in the modern history of Quran recitation. Egypt's Minister of Awqaf, Muhammad Mukhtar Gomaa, also issued a statement commemorating his contributions to Quran recitation and his leadership of the syndicate.
