= Syndicate of Quran Reciters in Egypt =

Professional organisation in Egypt involving Quran reciters

Syndicate of Quran Reciters
- Syndicate of Memorizers and Reciters of the Noble Quran of the Arab Republic of Egypt
- نقابة محفظي وقراء القرآن الكريم
- Established: 30 July 1983 (43 years ago)
- Type: Professional syndicate
- Headquarters: Cairo, Egypt
- Region served: Egypt
- Members: 10,000+ (2025)
- Official language: Arabic
- Head (naqīb): Muhammad Saleh Hashad
- Deputy head: Mahmoud al-Khusht
- Main organ: General Assembly
- Affiliations: Ministry of Endowments; General Authority of Egyptian Quran Recitations (مشيخة عموم المقارئ المصرية)

The Syndicate of Memorizers and Reciters of the Noble Quran (Note: Arabic: نقابة محفظي وقراء القرآن الكريم) (also shortened as Syndicate of Quran Reciters) (Note: Arabic: نقابة القراء) is a professional syndicate in Egypt, representing individuals engaged in the memorization, teaching, and recitation of the Quran. Established under Egyptian Law No. 93 of 1983, it is headquartered in Cairo. Its responsibilities include promoting standards of Quranic recitation, preserving the traditions of Qira'at, and providing social and professional services to its members. It also cooperates with Egyptian religious institutes, particularly the Ministry of Endowments and Al-Azhar al-Sharif.

The syndicate is among the Quranic institutions overseen by the General Sheikhdom of Egyptian Quran Recitation Schools (Mashiakhat Umum al-Maqari' al-Misriyya; مشيخة عموم المقارئ المصرية).

== History ==
=== Establishment ===
The proposal to establish a professional organisation for Quran memorizers and reciters emerged in Egypt in the early 1980s. According to accounts of the syndicate's founding, the proposal generated debate over whether Quran recitation should be organised as a profession. The intervention of Grand Imam of al-Azhar Gad al-Haq helped advance the proposal.

Law No. 93 of 1983, providing for the establishment of the syndicate, was enacted by the People's Assembly and issued by President Hosni Mubarak on 30 July 1983. It was published in the Official Gazette on 4 August. The law established the syndicate as a legal entity and defined its objectives, membership requirements, governing bodies, and financial arrangements.

The founding committee included prominent Egyptian reciters Abdul Basit 'Abd us-Samad, Mahmud Ali al-Banna, Abul Ainain Shuaisha, and Shahat Muhammad Anwar, along with representatives of the Egyptian Quranic recitation tradition and legal advisers. Abdul Basit became its first head, with al-Banna serving as deputy.

=== Headquarters ===
The syndicate initially operated from rented premises in Cairo relocating to premises associated with the Sheikh Ghurab Mosque in el-Qubba district. Disputes concerning the premises later led to further relocations.

In 2025, the Ministry of Endowments provided support for the establishment of a new headquarters in the el-Zeitoun district of Cairo, in an annex of Al-Rahman Mosque. The premises were inaugurated in June 2025 and hosted the syndicate's elections in August.

== Objectives and functions ==
Law No. 93 of 1983 establishes the syndicate's principal objectives as improving Quran memorization and teaching, promoting knowledge of the tajwid (rules governing recitation), and preserving the Islamic heritage associated with the recognized sciences of Quranic readings. It also authorizes the syndicate to report violations of recitation rules to competent authorities.

Its statutory functions include:

- Promoting research and education in Quranic readings and improving the professional knowledge of members.
- Advising the Ministry of Endowments, broadcasting organisations and other institutions on matters relating to Quranic recitation.
- Sending delegations of reciters to domestic and international events.
- Providing pensions, healthcare and social and cultural services to members.
- Helping members obtain professional opportunities and resolving disputes involving them.
- Maintaining relations with similar organisations in Arab, African and other Muslim-majority countries.

== Membership ==
The founding law divides membership into three categories, designated A, B, and C. Category A comprises active members who have memorized the entire Quran and meet the applicable membership requirements. Category B comprises active members who have memorized at least seven ajza' (parts) of the Quran. Category C is for associate members who provide significant material or other services to the syndicate, or have relevant interests in its activities. Associate members cannot attend the General Assembly or stand for election to the board.

Admission to active membership requires candidates to pass examinations assessing their Quran memorization and recitation. The examination are open to men and women and are organised in separate sessions. Successful applicants are required to pay admission and annual membership fees. In 2022, the reported annual membership was EGP 150, with different fees for applicants aged between 40 and 50.

2025 Reports described more than 10,000 members eligible to participate in its general elections. Other accounts have cited a higher overall membership.

=== Standards and conduct ===
The syndicate's board oversees its administration, finances and professional activities. The founding law provides for disciplinary action against members who violate their professional duties or ethical standards. Penalties include warnings, reprimands, fines, suspension, removal from membership, as well as imprisonment in circumstances specified by law.

The syndicate also promotes compliance with recognised standards of Quranic recitation and has called on reciters throughout Egypt, including non-members, to observe the rules governing Quranic recitation.

=== Member welfare and pensions ===
The founding law provides for a subsidy and pension fund to support members and their eligible family members. In 2025, syndicate representatives reported that the Ministry of Endowments had provided financial assistance to support increases in members' pensions.

== Leadership ==
The syndicate is headed by a naqib (leader or chairperson), selected by its General Assembly through election. Its heads have included the following:

No.	Name	Tenure	Notes
1.	Abdul Basit Abd us-Samad	1984–1988	First head of the syndicate, with Mahmud Ali al-Banna as deputy head.
2.	Abul Ainain Shuaisha	1988–2011	
3.	Mohamed Mahmoud al-Tablawi	2011–2020	
4.	Muhammad Saleh Hashad	2020–present	Re-elected for second term in 2025. Also served as sheikh of Egyptian recitation schools until 2025.

- Shahat Muhammad Anwar has served as a member of board of directors of the syndicate, and subsequently as its secretary general until his death in 2008.
