= Abul Ainain Shuaisha =

Egyptian Quran reciter (1922–2011)

Shaykh al-Maqari Abul Ainain Shuaisha
- أبو العينين شعيشع
- Born: August 12, 1922; Kafr El Sheikh Governorate, Kingdom of Egypt
- Died: June 11, 2011 (aged 88); Egypt
- Occupation: Qari

Head of Syndicate of Quran Reciters
- In office 1988–2011
- Preceded by: Abdul Basit 'Abd us-Samad
- Succeeded by: Mohamed Mahmoud al-Tablawi

Religious life
- Religion: Islam
- Denomination: Sunni

Abul Ainain Shuaisha (Note: Arabic: أبو العينين شعيشع) (12 August 1922 – 23 June 2011) was an Egyptian Quran reciter. He served as the head of the Egyptian Syndicate of Quran Reciters from 1988 until his death, succeeding Abdul Basit 'Abd us-Samad. He was also known by the titles "King of Saba" and "Nightingale of the Realm of Quranic Recitation".

== Early life and education ==
Shuaisha was born on 12 August 1922 in Biyala, Kafr El Sheikh Governorate, Kingdom of Egypt. His father died when he was nine years old, after which he was enrolled in a traditional Quran school (kuttab). He memorised the Quran under the guidance of Yusuf Shetta.

He became known for his recitations during his early teens and performed at religious gatherings in Kafr El Sheikh and neighbouring area. In 1936, at the age of 14, he was invited to reciter at an event in Mansoura commemorating those killed during the 1935 protests against British colonial influence in Egypt.

== Career ==
=== Egyptian Radio ===
In 1939, Shuaisha was introduced to Egyptian Radio after his recitation attracted the attention of Abdullah Afifi, who served as an imam at the Egyptian royal court. He was later accepted as a radio reciter at the age of 17, making him one of the youngest Quran reciters to join the station at the time.

Shuaisha was influenced by the recitation style of Muhammad Rifat during his early career. Egyptian Radio also asked him to help restore damaged sections of Rifat's recordings. Shuaisha later developed his own distinctive style of recitation.

In 1940, he was invited to reciter the Quran at Al-Aqsa Msoque in Jerusalem. He was invited by the Near East Broadcasting Station in Palestine and spent three months working there. His Friday recitations from the mosque were broadcast live by local radio stations.

=== Religious positions and public service ===
In 1969, Shuaisha was appointed as Quran reciter at Omar Makram Mosque in Tahrir Square, Cairo. In 1992, he served as a reciter at Sayyida Zainab Mosque.

He was elected head of the Egyptian Syndicate of Quran Reciters in 1988, succeeding Abdul Basit 'Abd us-Samad, and held the position until his death. He also served as a consultant to the Minister of Religious Endowments on Quranic affairs. He also served as a member of the committee under Supreme Council for Islamic Affairs, dean of the international Institute of Quran memorisation, and a member of Mosque Architecture Committee in Cairo.

=== International recognition ===
Shuaisha travelled internationally to reciter the Quran and participate in international Quran events and competitions. He recited at prominent mosques around the world, including Masjid al-Haram in Mecca, Al-Aqsa in Jerusalem, Umayyad Mosque in Damascus, and London Central Mosque in London. He also served as a judge in several international Quran competitions in Iran.

He received honours during his career, including the Order of Merit from Syria, the Order of the Two Rivers (First Class) from Iraq and the Order of the Cedar from Lebanon. He also received awards and decorations from other countries.

== Style and influence ==
Shuaisha was known for his use of saba maqam, a musical mode associated with expressions of sadness. This led him to be known by the titles "King of Saba," (Note: Arabic: ملك الصبا) "Nightingale of the Realm of Quran Recitation," (Note: Arabic: كروان دولة التلاوة) and "Master of Melancholic Maqam." (Note: Arabic: صاحب المقام الحزين) Although influenced by Muhammad Rifat, he later developed a distinct recitation style.

== Death ==
Shuaisha died on 23 June 2011 in Egypt, aged 88. His funeral took place in Cairo. A funeral prayer in absentia was also held in mosques across his hometown of Biyala on the following day.
