= Abdul Basit 'Abd us-Samad =

Egyptian Qur'an reciter (1927–1988)

Shaykh al-Maqâri Abdul Basit Abd us-Samad
- عبد الباسط عبد الصمد
- Abdul Basit in 1966 in South Africa
- Born: 1927; Armant, Kingdom of Egypt
- Died: 30 November 1988 (aged 60–61); Cairo, Egypt
- Resting place: City of The Dead; near Mausoleum of Imam al-Shafi'i, Cairo, Egypt
- Education: Qira'at
- Occupation: Qari
- Known for: Unique melodic recitation of the Quran
- Title: The Golden Throat

Head of Syndicate of Quran Reciters
- In office 1984–1988
- Succeeded by: Abul Ainain Shuaisha

Religious life
- Religion: Islam
- Denomination: Sunni

Abdul Basit Muhammad Abdus-Samad (Note: Arabic: عبد الباسط محمد عبد الصمد, ‘Abdu-l-Bāsiṭ Muḥammad ‘Abdu-ṣ-Ṣamad) (1927 – 30 November 1988) was an Egyptian Quran reciter known for his melodic mujawwad style of recitation, vocal control and distinctive voice. He was also known by the epithets 'Golden Throat', 'Voice of Mecca', and 'A Voice from Heaven'.

Abdul Basit joined Egyptian Radio as a reciter in 1951 and served as a reciter at the Imam al-Shafi'i Mosque and Al-Hussein Mosque in Cairo. In 1984, he became the first president of Egypt's Syndicate of Quran Reciters (Niqābat al-Qurrāʾ). His international visits included recitations at prominent mosques and religious gatherings across the Middle East, Asia, Africa, Europe, and North America.

Abdul Basit is commonly grouped with Siddiq Al-Minshawi, Mustafa Ismail and Al-Hussary as one of the four prominent Egyptian Quran reciters of 20th century who have an outsized impact on the Islamic World.

== Early life ==
Abdul Basit Abdus-Samad was born in 1927 in the village of al-Mara'za, in Armant, in what was then Qena Governorate, Kingdom of Egypt. The area is now part of Luxor Governorate, Egypt. His grandfather, Sheikh Abdul Samad, was a popular reciter in Upper Egypt. His father, Muhammad Abdus-Samad, was also a Quran reciter and worked as a civil servant in Egypt's Ministry of Communications.

Abdul Basit had two elder brothers, Mahmud and Abdul Hamid, who studied Quranic memorization at a madrasa. He joined them at the age of six. His teacher reportedly observed his aptitude for memorization, his attention to tajwid and his vocal ability.

== Education ==
Abdul Basit finished the memorization of the Quran by the age of ten. He then continued his education with the Qira’at (Quranic recitations) under the guidance of Muhammad Salim Hamada, a teacher of Quranic recitation.

According to biographical accounts, Abdul Basit initially intended to travel to Tanta in Lower Egypt to continue his studies. However, Before his departure, Muhammad Salim arrived to a religious institute in Armant to take up a teaching position. A local association established in Asfun Al-Matanah also supported instruction in Quranic memorization and recitation, enabling Abdul Basit to study under Muhammad Salim locally. Abdul Basit studied Al-Shatibiyya, a classical poem used in the study of the seven canonical traditions of Quranic recitation.

By the age of twelve, Abdul Basit was reportedly being invited to recite at religious gatherings in cities and villages throughout Qena Governorate, particularly Asfun Al-Matanah. Muhammad Salim, recommended him to local communities, helping his reputation as a young reciter.

== Career ==
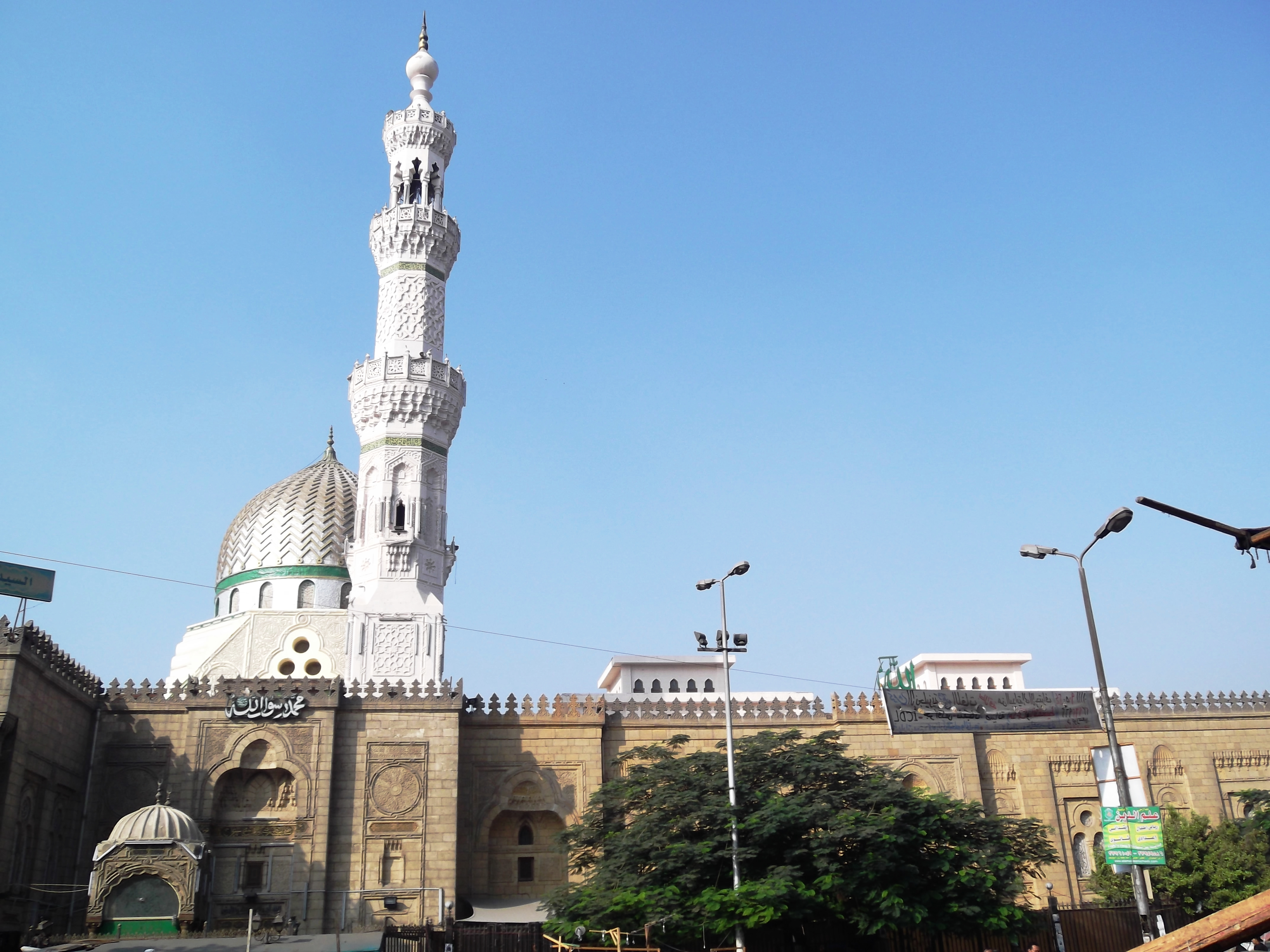
Sayyida Zaynab Mosque, Cairo

Abdul Basit gained wider recognition in Cairo around 1950, when he was invited to participate in the celebration of the birth of Sayyida Zainab, at Sayyida Zainab Mosque. On the final night of the event, several established reciters of the time were present, including Abdul Fattah Al-Shashaa’i, Mustafa Ismail, Abdul Azim Zahir, and Abu Al-Aynayn Sha’iisha. Abdul Basit joined the audience to listen to these established reciters.

After midnight at the celebration, Abdul Basit was introduced to the audience by a relative, and invited to recite for approximately ten minutes. The audience reportedly responded favourably and repeatedly requested that he continue, extending his recitation to around two hours.

Abdul Basit's portrait in radio newspaper in 1955.

Following the event, Abdul Basit joined Egyptian Radio as a Quran reciter in 1951. This helped bring his recitations to a wider audience. His recordings included both murattal and mujawwad recitations. His recitations were also broadcast by radio stations in other Arab countries.

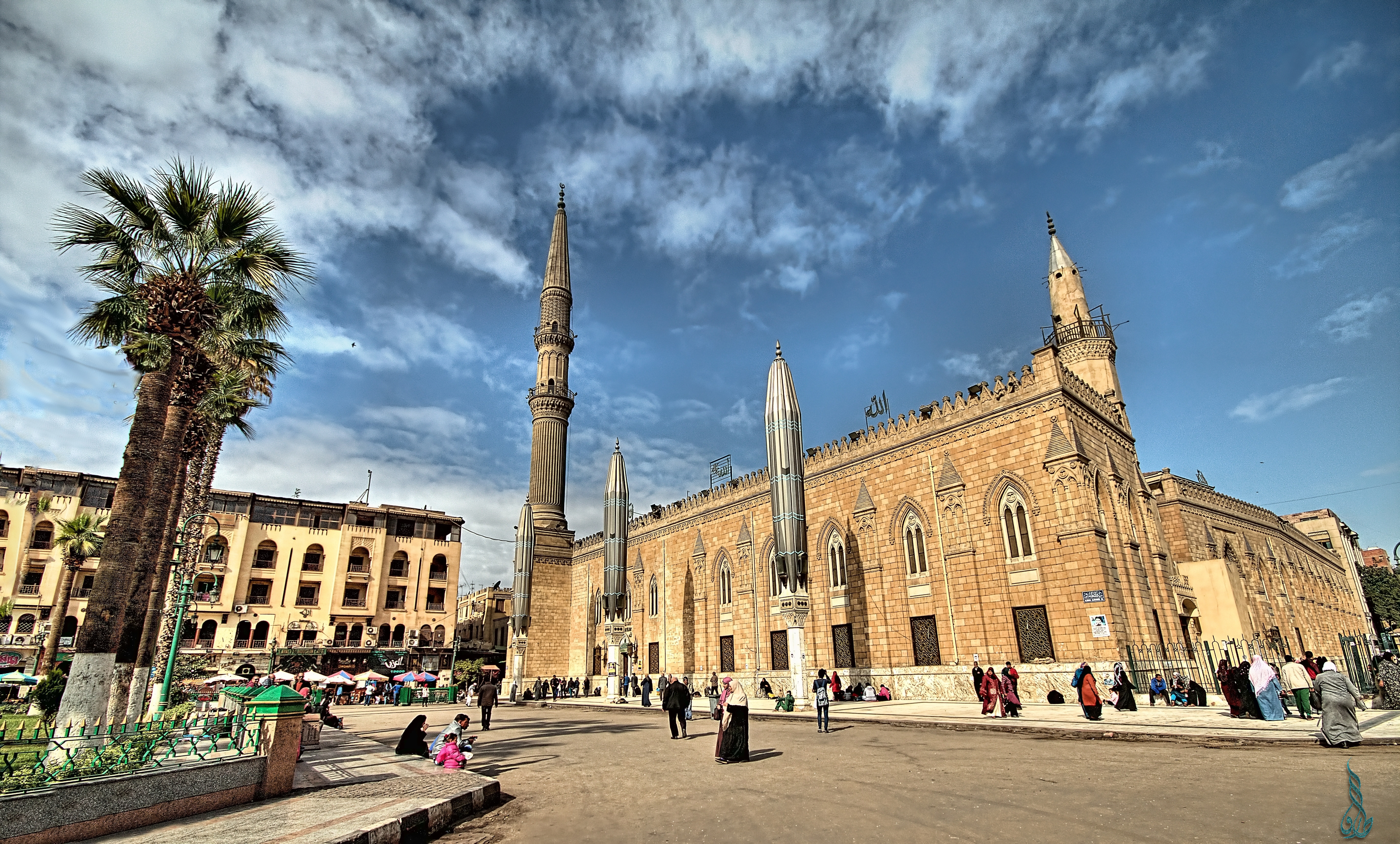
Al-Hussein Mosque, in Cairo

He served as a Qari at the Imam Shafi'i Mosque in Cairo, from 1952 and later also appointed to Al-Hussein Mosque in 1985, succeeding Mahmud Ali al-Banna.

In 1984, Abdul Basit became the first president of the newly established Syndicate of Memorizers and Reciters of the Noble Quran, (Note: Arabic: نقابة محفظي وقراء القرآن الكريم, romanized: Niqābat Muḥaffiẓī wa-Qurrāʾ al-Qurʾān al-Karīm) also known as the Syndicate of Quran Reciters, (Note: Arabic: نقابة القراء, romanized: Niqābat al-Qurrāʾ) an organisation representing professional Quran reciters in Egypt.

=== Warsh recitation in Morocco ===
In 1986, Abdul Basit recorded a complete recitation of the Quran according to the Warsh transmission of Nafiʽ al-Madani in Morocco, at the request of King Hassan II of Morocco. According to accounts published by Egyptian media, the recording was completed in approximately 13 days. Rizq Khalil Habbah, a specialist in Quranic recitation from Al-Azhar al-Sharif, was reportedly present during the recording. The tapes were reviewed by Rizq Khalil Habib and other Egyptian Quran recitation specialists then sent to Moroccan radio and television for broadcast.

In 2004, Abdul Basit's son, Tareq Abdul Basit submitted the recording to a committee responsible for reviewing Quranic texts at al-Azhar. In 2020, Tareq donated the complete recording to Egyptian Radio and Television, which began broadcasting it that year.

== International travels ==
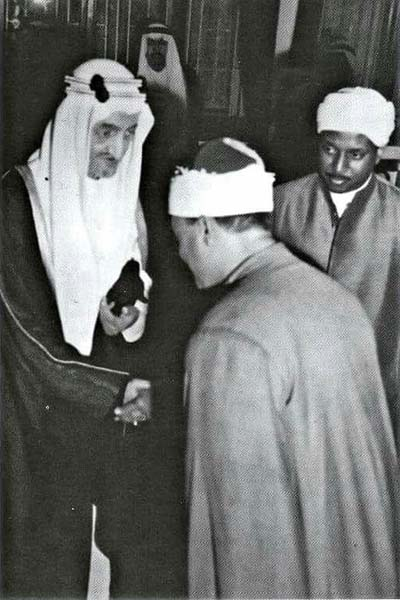
Abdul Basit with King Faisal bin Abdulaziz of Saudi Arabia in the early 1970s

Abdul Basit travelled to several places during his career, performing at mosques, religious gatherings and official events across the world, including:

- 1952, Saudi Arabia: He did the Hajj pilgrimage accompanied by his father and recited the Quran in the Masjid-al-Haram in Mecca and the Prophet's Mosque in Medina.
- 1955, Indonesia: Abdul Basit and Muhammad Siddiq Al-Minshawi recited on Radio Republik Indonesia in November. Abdul Basit recited at an event in a mosque in Jakarta attended by large crowds. Reports state that the mosque was filled to capacity, with listeners gathered outside for a considerable distance. Estimates suggested that more than a quarter of a million people stood throughout the night to hear his recitation until dawn.
- 1955 & 1956, Syria: He visited Damascus in 1955 and Aleppo in 1956.
- 1956, Malaysia: Visited during the early years of nation-building, when Gamal Abdel Nasser's Egypt contributed to shaping an Islamic identity as a core element of the country’s national identity.
- 1960, Soviet Union: Accompanied President Gamal Abdel Nasser on his visit to the Soviet Union and became the first Qari to recite the Quran in the Kremlin in Moscow.
- 1961, Morocco: Spent a month during Ramadan visiting at the invitation of King Mohammed V, who offered him Moroccan citizenship and position as a reciter at the royal court, both of which he declined. The visits reflected his close personal relationship with the king, reinforced Egypt–Morocco ties, and were widely celebrated by Egyptian media.
- Pakistan: Made several visits during his career, including 1961 and 1987 recitations at the Badshahi Mosque in Lahore, and a 1967 performance in the presence of Mahmoud Khalil al-Husary.
- 1963, Algeria: Visited post-independence Algeria, where he was received by President Ahmed Ben Bella at Martyrs’ Square in Algiers and recited at the Ketchaoua Mosque following its rededication from a cathedral.

Abdul Basit waving farewell in Cape Town, South Africa in 1966.

- 1966, South Africa: Arrived in Johannesburg after a year of preparation by the local Muslim community; his performances included Surah Al-Hujurat (verse 13) which reportedly carried a subtle social message, while he maintained an apolitical stance during his one-month visit. He recited at Cape Town's Green Point Track on 30 October, in an event reported by Muslim News as attracting more than 30,000 people. The newspaper also reported that he recited in all seven recognised traditions of Quranic recitation and performed at Muir Street Mosque. His visit included meetings with members of the Muslim Judicial Council and other local Muslim leaders.
- Palestine and Jordan: Abdul Basit visited Jordan and Jerusalem, where he recited the Quran at the Al-Aqsa Mosque during Ramadan for two years before 1967 Six-Day War. He also recited at the Ibrahimi Mosque in Hebron.
- 1971, United States: Visited during a period when President al-Sadat sought to strengthen ties between Egypt and the U.S.; the visit received extensive media coverage.
- 1980, India: Visited Darul Uloom Deoband during its centenary celebrations, reciting the Quran before audiences including Prime Minister Indira Gandhi.
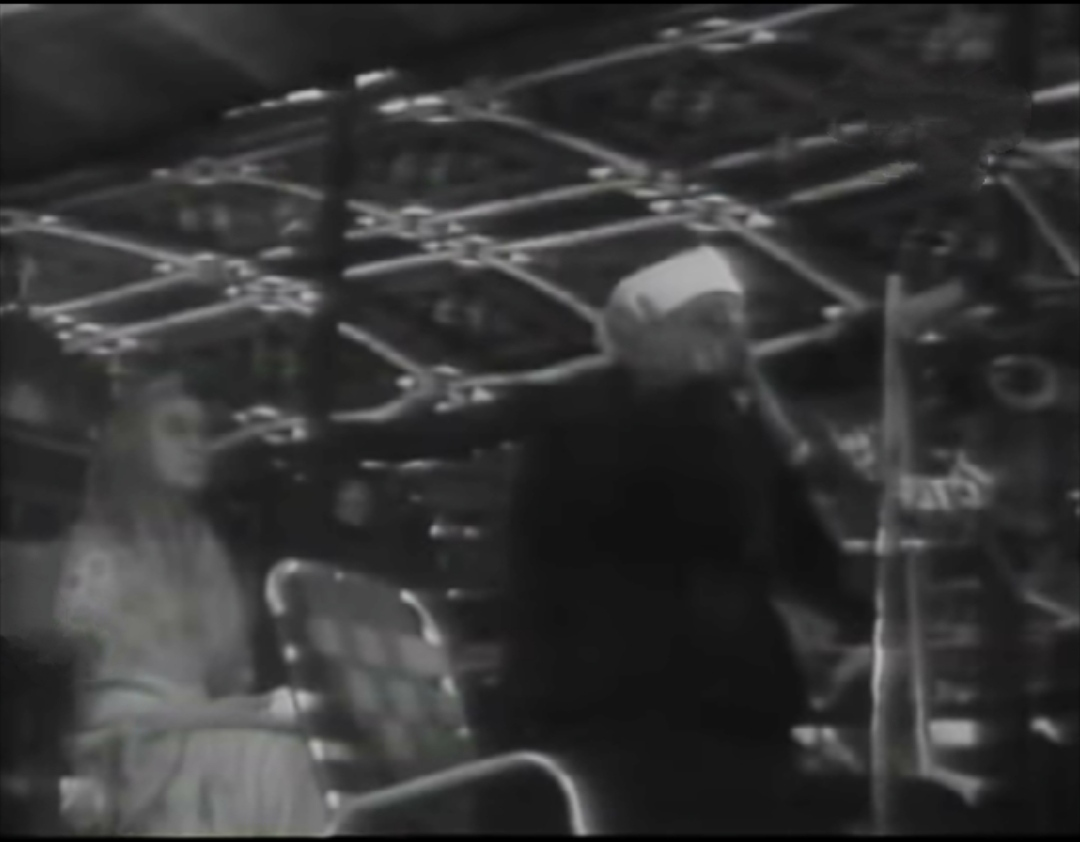
  Abdul Basit reciting at Centenary Celebration of Darul Uloom Deoband in 1980, with former Prime Minister of India Indira Gandhi in the background.
- 1985, Paris, France: Held a one-hour event at the Palais de Congrès Theater attended by approximately 4,000 people, (Note: 50,000 spectators according to Asha'b Newspaper issue, recalling the interview from Abdul Basit) half of whom were non-Muslims and the rest French Muslims, Moroccans, Tunisians, and Egyptians. He noted in interviews that he wore a suit for the first time in his life to move around the city discreetly.

== Honours and awards ==
Through the travels of Sheikh Abdul Basit Abdul Samad around the world, he received a large number of honours and awards:

Abdul Basit receiving the Syrian Order of Merit from Syrian Prime Minister Sabri al-Asali in 1956.

- Order of Civil Merit of the Syrian Arab Republic (Second Class) In 1956.
- National Order of the Cedar from Lebanon in 1965.
- The Order of Merit from the Senegalese President in 1975.
- Order of Intellectual Merit from Muhammad V of Morocco.
- The Order of Scholars from Pakistani President Zia-ul-Haq in 1984.
- Order of Merit (Egypt) from the former Egyptian President Hosni Mubarak during the celebration of the Day of Preachers in 1987.
- The Golden Medal from Malaysia.
- A Medal from the Prime Minister of Syria in 1959.
- A Medal from the Prime Minister of Malaysia in 1965.
- The Golden Medal from Pakistan in 1980.
- The Egyptian Radio Medal on its fiftieth anniversary.
- In 1990, he received the last honours after his departure from former President Mohamed Hosni Mubarak in the celebration of Laylat al-Qadr.
- He has won three world Qira'at competitions in the early 1970s.

== Illness and death ==
During the later years of his life, Abdul Basit experienced health problems associated with diabetes and liver disease. Less than a month before his death, he contracted hepatitis, further worsening his condition. He was admitted to hospital where doctors and his family encouraged him to seek medical treatment abroad. Following their advice, he travelled to London for care and stayed there for about a week. His son Tareq accompanied him during this time and was eventually advised to bring him back to Egypt as his health continued to decline.

=== Death ===
Abdul Basit died on Wednesday, November 30, 1988. His funeral prayer was held the following day, after Zuhr Prayer. The attendants of his funeral included ambassadors of various countries, as well as kings and heads of state. He was laid to rest in City of the Dead near the Mausoleum Imam Shafi, Cairo.

== Legacy ==
In February 2020, the Egyptian Ministry of Endowments, under the chairmanship of Muhammad Mukhtar Gomaa, named its 27th World Competition of the Holy Quran in honour of Abdul Basit. The competition was held in Cairo, the opening ceremony commenced with a Quranic recitation by Abdul Basit's son, Tareq Abdul Basit Abdul Samad.

In January 2026, the Holy Quran Academy in Sharjah, United Arab Emirates, inaugurated an exhibit dedicated to Abdul Basit Abd us-Samad at its Museum of Renowned Reciters. the exhibit was established following the donation of personal belongings by his sons included photographs, Qurans, recording equipment, handwritten letters, his Quranic certification and medals awarded to him. The inauguration was attended by Sultan bin Muhammad Al-Qasimi, the ruler of Sharjah, who received Abdul Basit's sons and presented them with a certificate of appreciation for the donation. The occasion also included the launch of Al-Moeen, a smart application designed to support Quranic recitation and memorization.

=== Children ===
Abdul Basit was survived by his sons Khaled, Essam, Yasir and Tareq. Yasir and Tareq pursued careers as Quran reciters, following their father’s path in Quranic recitation. Tareq also gave several interviews about his father’s life and career. In 2006, a mosque in his hometown of Armant, in the Luxor Governorate, was inaugurated in his name.

Khaled died on 9 January 2023, while Essam died on 31 October 2025.
