= State of Recitation =

2025 Egyptian television competition

- دولة التلاوة (Dawlat al-Tilāwah)
- Genre: Quranic Competition – Religious Reality Television
- Created by: Ministry of Endowments (Egypt)
- Presented by: Aya Abdel Rahman
- Judges: Hassan Abdel Nabi; Taha Abdel Wahab; Mustafa Hosny; Taha Al-Nu'mani
- Country of origin: Egypt
- Original language: Arabic
- No. of seasons: 1

Production
- Executive producer: United Media Services (UMS)
- Running time: 60 minutes
- Budget: Total prizes worth EGP 3.5 million

Original release
- Network: Al-Hayat TV, CBC, Al-Nas TV, Misr Quran Kareem
- Release: 14 November 2025 – present

Related
- Quranic recitation competitions

State of Recitation (Arabic: دولة التلاوة, Dawlat al-Tilāwah) is an Egyptian religious reality television competition broadcast aimed at discovering and nurturing young talents in the recitation and chanting of the Quran. Heralded as the largest Quranic competition of its kind in Egypt, its primary focus is on reviving the authentic and original Egyptian school of Quranic recitation.

The program is a collaboration between the Egyptian Ministry of Endowments and United Media Services (UMS). It premiered on Friday, November 14, 2025.

== Prizes and competition mechanics ==
The total value of the prizes awarded in the program is 3.5 million Egyptian pounds (EGP).

The prize distribution is as follows:

- The two first-place winners, one each in the Tarteel and Tajweed branches, receive EGP 1 million each.
- In addition to the financial prize, the two first-place winners are granted the honor of recording the full Mushaf (printed copy of the Quran) in their voices. This recording will be broadcast on the Misr Quran Kareem channel. They will also be honored by leading the Tarawih prayers at Al-Imam Al-Hussein Mosque in Cairo during the upcoming Ramadan.

The competition saw a significant turnout, with the number of initial applicants surpassing 14,000 contestants from various Egyptian governorates.

== Judging panel ==
The program's judging panel consists of prominent figures in the fields of Quranic readings "Qira'at", musical modes "Maqamat" and performance. Key members include:

- Hassan Abdel Nabi (Deputy Chairman of the Al-Azhar Review Committee for the Mushaf)
- Taha Abdel Wahab (Expert in voices and Maqamat)
- Mustafa Hosny (Islamic preacher)
- Taha Al-Nu'mani (Qari/Reciter)

Prominent figures also participate in the program's scientific committee, such as Osama al-Azhari (Egyptian Minister of Awqaf). The program also features guest appearances from dignitaries like Ali Gomaa (former Grand Mufti of Egypt and member of the Council of Senior Scholars) and Ahmed Nua`yna` (Sheikh of the Egyptian General Administration of Quranic Reciters).
