= Siddiq al-Minshawi =

Egyptian Quran reciter (1895–1984)

Siddiq al-Sayed al-Minshawi
- صديق السيد المنشاوي
- Born: 1895 or 1998; El-Mansha, Sohag Governorate, Khedivate of Egypt
- Died: 1984 (aged 88-89); El-Mansha, Sohag, Egypt
- Occupation: Quran reciter
- Children: Muhammad, Ahmed, and Mahmoud

Siddiq al-Sayed Tayeb al-Minshawi (1895 or 1898 – 1984) was an Egyptian Quran reciter from Sohag Governorate, Upper Egypt. He belonged to a family known for its contribution to Quranic recitation. He was the father of reciter Muhammad Siddiq al-Minshawi.

== Life ==
Siddiq al-Minshawi was born in 1895 or 1898 in El Mansha, Sohag Governorate of Upper Egypt. His father, Al-Sayed al-Minshawi, was a Quran reciter and teacher, as was his grandfather Tayeb al-Minshawi.

He memorised the Quran under his father by the age of nine, then studied Quranic recitations under Shaykh al-Mas'ud in Cairo and at Al-Azhar University. He studied the ten canonical recitations and Quranic exegesis (tafsir), and became known as a prominent reciter in Upper Egypt.

In 1924, he travelled for Hajj pilgrimage to Mecca.

He travelled throughout Upper Egypt, including Qena and Aswan, to reciter the Quran. The Egyptian Radio recorded some of his recitations, reportedly eight recordings, in Upper Egypt.

== Family ==
He was the father of the Quran reciters Muhammad Siddiq Al-Minshawi (1920–1969), Ahmed Al-Minshawi (1930–1947), and Mahmoud al-Minshawi (born 1943). His grandson, Siddiq Mahmoud al-Minshawi (born 1974) later also became a reciter. The Family is often referred to as "Al-Minshawi Quranic Family".

Siddiq al-Minshawi is sometimes referred to as al-Minshawi al-Kabīr (Senior Minshawi) to distinguish his from his sons, and also in recognition to his pioneering role in the Minshawi School of Quran recitation.

== Death and recognition ==
Siddiq al-Sayed al-Minshawi died in 1984, aged approximately 86. Sources differ on whether his death occurred in March or April.

He was posthumously awarded in 1992 during Laylat al-Qadr celebration, by President Hosni Mubarak. While his son, Muhammad al-Minshawi posthumously awarded Egyptian Order of Sciences and Arts, First Class.

In October 2026, parts of his recitation which was recorded in 1954 was broadcast by Holy Quran Radio from Cairo.
