= Mahmoud Zakzouk =

Egyptian academic (1933–2020)

Minister of Religious Endowment
- In office 1995–2011

Personal details
- Born: Mahmoud Hamdi Zakzouk; 27 December 1933 Dakahlia, Egypt
- Died: 1 April 2020 (aged 86)
- Education: Al Azhar University; LMU Munich

Mahmoud Zakzouk (Arabic: محمود حمدي زقزوق; 27 December 1933 – 1 April 2020) was an Egyptian politician and academic. He served as minister of religious endowment of Egypt from 1995 to 2011.

== Early life and education ==
Zakzouk was born in Dakahlia, Egypt, on 27 December 1933. He obtained a bachelor's degree in languages from Al Azhar University in 1959. Then he received a master's degree from the same university in 1960. He also received a PhD in philosophy from LMU Munich in 1968. His PhD thesis dealt with the comparison of the philosophical approaches of Descartes and Al-Ghazali.

== Career ==
Zakzouk was a professor of philosophy and taught philosophy at his alma mater, Al Azhar University. He joined the university in 1968. From 1972 to 1976 he was visiting professor in Libya and from 1980 to 1984 in Qatar. He served as the dean of the Islamic Theology Faculty at Al Azhar from 1987 to 1995. He was appointed minister of religious endowments (Awqaf) in 1995 and was in office until the Revolution of 2011 when he was removed.

Zakzouk served as head of the Supreme Council for Islamic Affairs to which he was appointed in 1996. He held the following posts: vice president of Al Azhar University (1995), member of the Islamic Research Academy, member of the European Academy of Sciences and Arts in Salzburg and head of the Egyptian Society of Philosophy.

In July 2016, Zakzouk received the bishop Miguel Ángel Ayuso Guixot to give him a tour of Al Azhar University upon the request of Pope Francis and to discuss the formal resumption of dialogue between the Pontifical Council for Interreligious Dialogue and Al Azhar University.

=== Views ===
Zakzouk argued in 2006 that the Baháʼí Faith "is 'not a revealed religion' for Muslims and thus not subject to special protection in Egypt." He also publicly claimed that capital punishment for converts, more specifically those Muslim-born persons who convert to other religious beliefs, is legal. In 2007, he called on Egyptian imams to condemn the practice of female genital mutilation.

Zakzouk frowned on the use of the niqab. He expelled a counsellor wearing the niqab from a meeting at his ministry, and stated "the religious counsellor should set an example of moderation. By wearing the niqab, this female counsellor promotes a tradition not demanded by Islam".

In 2010, Zakzouk announced a plan to unify the Adhan, but the religious affairs committee in the parliament refused his proposal. Seven years later, actress Shereen Reda and the Minister of Religious Affairs, Gaber Tayae, relaunched Zakzouk's suggestions through a press campaign.

== Personal life and death ==
Zakzouk was married and had one child. He died on 1 April 2020.

== Prizes ==
- 1997: Egyptian State Prize for Social Sciences

=== Works ===
Zakzouk published many scientific articles and books, including On Philosophy Culture and Peace in Islam, On the Role of Islam in the Development of Philosophical Thought (1989), Al Ghazalis Philosophie im Vergleich mit Descartes (Comparison of Al Ghazali's Philosophy with that of Descartes, 1992), Fragen zum Thema Islam (Questions on Islam, 1999) and Einführung in den Islam (Introduction to Islam, 2000). He also contributed to The End of Tolerance? which was published in 2002. The book focuses on interfaith origins of tolerance.
