= Mustafa Ismail =

Egyptian qari (1905–1978)

Shaykh Qari Mustafa Ismail
- مصطفى محمد مرسي اسماعيل
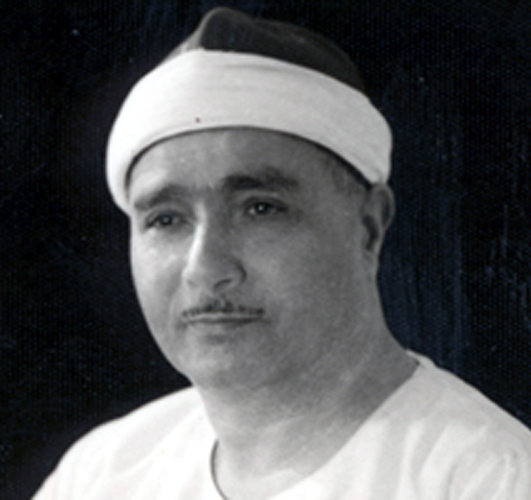
- Born: 17 June 1905; Mit Gazal, Gharbia Governorate, Khedivate of Egypt
- Died: 26 December 1978 (aged 73); Alexandria, Egypt
- Known for: Recitation of Quran

Religious life
- Religion: Islam
- Sect: Sunni

Mustafa Muhammad Mursi Ismail (Note: Arabic: مصطفى محمد مرسي اسماعيل) (17 June 1905 – 26 December 1978), commonly known as Mustafa Ismail, was an Egyptian Quran reciter. His recitations were broadcast on Egyptian radio and performed at religious ceremonies and public events across Egypt and other countries. Ismail gained national recognition during the reign of King Farouk and later received recognition under President Gamal Abdel Nasser.

He is commonly grouped with Abdul Basit 'Abd us-Samad, Siddiq Al-Minshawi and Al-Hussary as one of the four prominent Egyptian Qur'an reciters of the 20th century who had an outsized impact on the Islamic World.

== Early life ==
Mustafa Ismail was born on 17 June 1905 in Mit Gazal, a village near Tanta in Egypt. He was raised by his grandfather, and began studying the Quran during childhood.

He studied initially under Abdul Rahman Abu al-Aynayn and later under Abdullah Shahata. `He later studied Quranic recitation` including the rules of tajwid, under Idris Fakhir. He continued his religious education at an institute in Tanta, where he studied tafsir (Qur'anic exegesis), qira'at (modes of recitation) and fiqh (Islamic jurisprudence).

Ismail memorised the entire Quran during childhood. His recitation attracted attention in his local community, and he began performing at religious and social gatherings. In 1925, he recited at the mourning ceremony of Husayn al-Qasabi, a wealthy resident of Tanta. Two years later, he recited at a ceremony associated with the Egyptian nationalist leader Saad Zaghloul in Damietta. These appearances contributed to his growing recognition among Egyptian audiences.

== Career ==
His son Wahid Mustafa said:

Somebody pointed at my father and said that this young man recites the Quran well. My father was originally scheduled to recite for 10 minutes with Shaykh Rifat. Sheikh Rifat enjoyed the recitation so much, my father recited for an hour and a half.

=== Egyptian radio ===
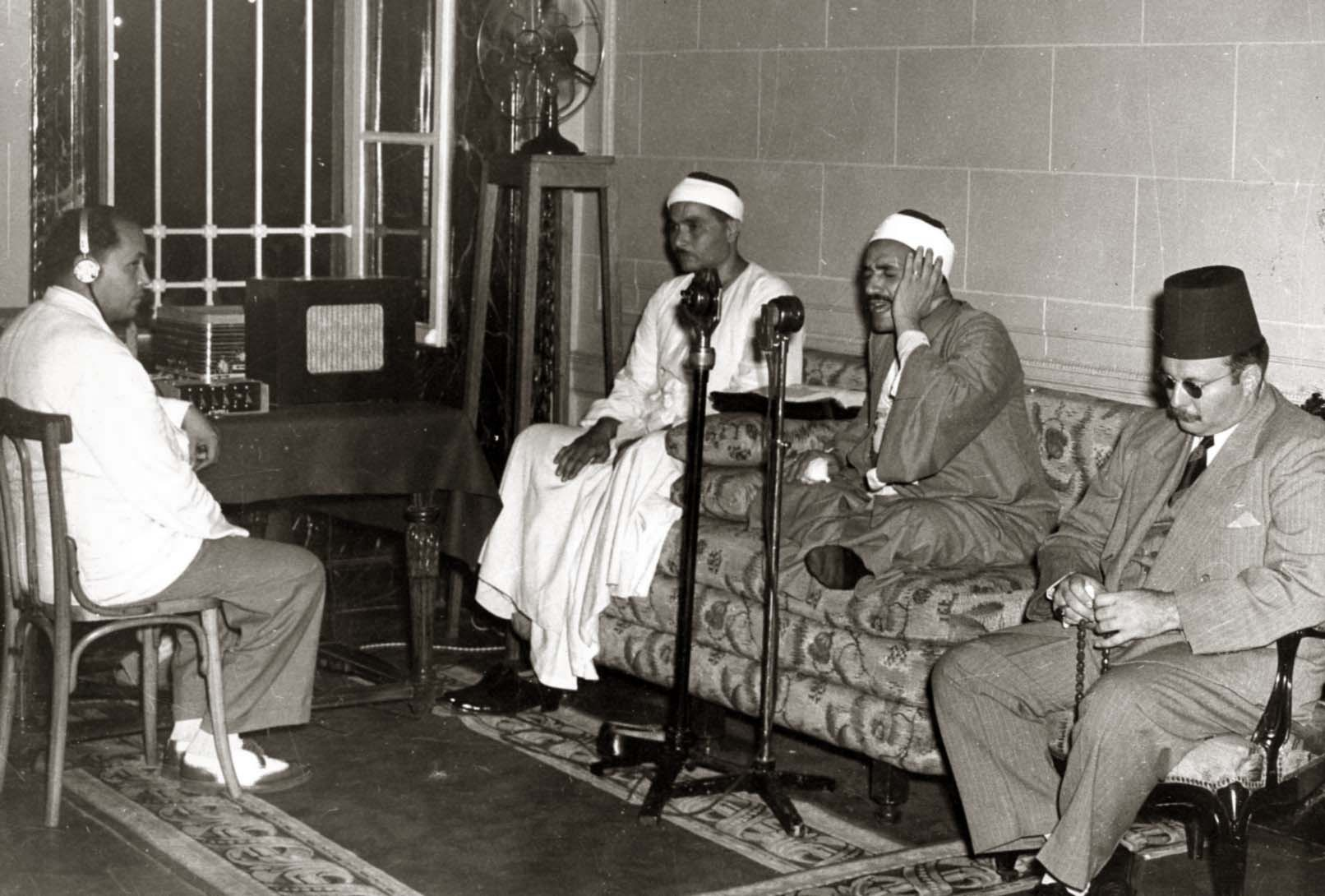
Mustafa Ismail (center, dressed in white) with Egyptian King Farouk (right) and Taha el-Fashni (reciting in the microphone)

Ismail was reportedly invited to substitute for an ill reciter who used to recite on Egypt radio. Ismail's recitation reportedly attracted the attention of King Farouk of Egypt, who later requested that Ismail recite Quran during Ramadan for himself. He then performed in the Abdeen Royal Palace during Ramadan.

In 1947, he became a reciter associated with Al-Azhar Mosque. He continued to perform at religious occasions including mawlid, and official events.

In 1965, Ismail received a distinction from President Gamal Abdel Nasser, according to biographical accounts. The Egyptian singers Umm Kulthum and Mohammed Abdel Wahab reportedly received honours on the same occasion.

== International Visits ==
=== Visits to Turkey ===
Ismail visited Turkey in 1969, initially planning to stay in Ankara for 15 days, followed by 15 days in Istanbul and visited the other major cities. Accounts of the tour describe a comparatively limited audience at his initial appearances in Ankara, after which he travelled to Istanbul.

His performances in Istanbul attracted considerable interest. Turkish President Cevdet Sunay gifted him a golden lettered Quran. Ismail remained in Turkey for the entire month of Ramadan, reciting at mosques and religious gatherings. He is reported to have said that "the people of Turkey are very respectful towards the Quran and they are very quiet and respectful during recitations."

One of his notable performances took place at the Süleymaniye Mosque, where he recited after the tarawih prayers. According to Turkish academic Emin Işık, the mosque was filled with listeners who had gathered to hear him. Işık recalled that Ismail expressed surprise at the audience's enthusiasm and the reception he received in Istanbul.

=== Visit to Jerusalem ===
Ismail visited Jerusalem in 1960 and 1977. In 1977, he travelled to Jerusalem with Egyptian President Anwar Sadat. During the visit, he recited the Quran at the Al-Aqsa Mosque.

== Style ==
Ismail was known for his use of Arabic Maqamat, melodic frameworks employed in traditional Arabic vocal performance. His recitation combined variation in pitch, ornamentation, phrasing and vocal intensity with the rules of tajwid.

Ahmed Nuaina, an Egyptian Qur'an reader, when discussing Ismail with composer Ammar El-Shereii, stated the following:

Mustafa Ismail is not just one sheikh. He is several methods and sheikhs in one. You can find all musical forms in his recitation. Whenever I hear a sheikh say something, I remember that Sheikh [Ismail] had said it before. Reciters have failed to come up with anything new after him. He moves easily between maqamat, and never went off tune. The listener’s ear never feels tired of him, because he always intrigues his listeners. He is creative in his qafalat [endings]. I can often predict qafalat, but his are always unexpected.

The composer Abdel-Wahab was of a similar opinion, once commenting that "he was big in his art, he was big in his management of his voice, and was the only reciter who surprised listeners with unexpected maqam routes."

In his Dream TV program, El-Shereii tried to analyse Ismail's musical approach by replaying a few short recitations. He concluded that "his recitation was miraculous, and he was a musical miracle as well. He was unique."

Analysing a different verse, El-Shereii stated:

He would go up to the very highest notes of the maqam, and he would do it with ease, enjoying himself. It is enough to drive you crazy. This man must have understood music very well, and must have meant what he was doing. He uses saba maqam at first to demonstrate huzn [sadness], then moves to the C, or agam, and then he takes his voice high up the notes when he says al-samaa (the sky) If this were not a musician, then we the musicians know nothing, and must go home. He knew what he was doing and did it depending on his knowledge of the [ten] qira'at [readings] and his very special expressive ability.

== Honours and recognition ==
Ismail received official honours and awards during his career. Biographical accounts report that he received a distinction from Gamal Abdel Nasser in 1965. He also received the Order of Arts and Lebanese honours, including the Order of the Cedar at the rank of Commander.

== Personal Life ==
Mustafa Ismail with his wife Fatima

Ismail was married to Fatima Omar of Damietta, with whom he had six children: three sons and three daughters. In an interview published in Akhir Saa'a magazine on 20 April 1966, his wife describes their approach to family life and upbringing of their children, which emphasised religious observances, including prayer and fasting. At the time, five of their children were married, including two sons who had married German women.

== Death ==
Mustafa Ismail died on 26 December 1978 at the University Hospital in Alexandria, Egypt, aged 73. He had suffered a cerebral stroke several days before his death and was admitted to the hospital's intensive care unit. His condition subsequently deteriorated following a brain haemorrhage, and he fell into a coma.
