= Osama al-Azhari =

Egyptian writer (born 1976)

- أسامة الأزهري
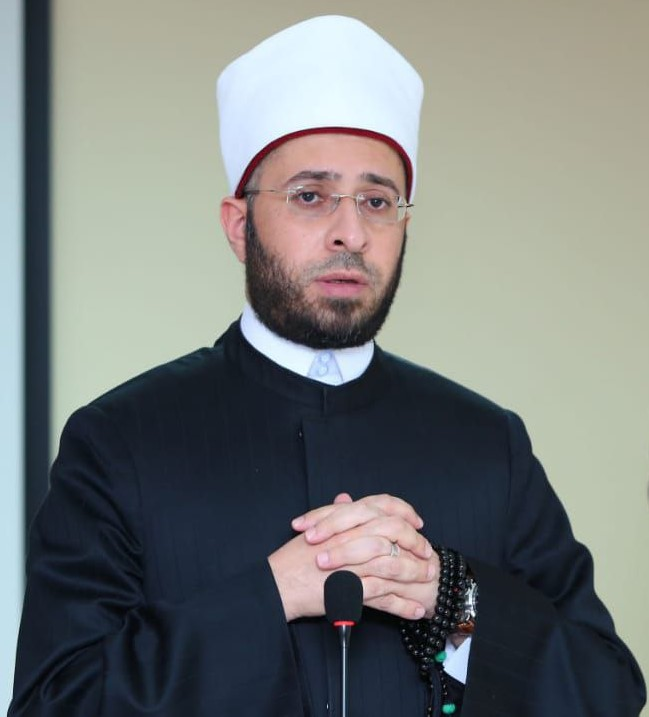

Minister of Religious Endowment
- Incumbent
- Assumed office July 2024
- President: Abdel Fattah el-Sisi
- Prime Minister: Mostafa Madbouly
- Preceded by: Muhammad Mukhtar Gomaa

Personal details
- Born: 16 July 1976 (age 50) Alexandria, Egypt
- Education: Al Azhar University

Religious life
- Denomination: Sunni
- Jurisprudence: Shafi'i

Osama al-Sayyid al-Azhari (Note: Arabic: أسامة السيد الأزهري) (born 16 July 1976) is an Egyptian Islamic scholar, academic and politician who has served as Egypt's Minister of Religious Endowment since July 2024. He previously served as a religious adviser to President Abdel Fattah el-Sisi and held teaching positions at Al-Azhar University and Al-Azhar Mosque.

== Early life and education ==
Al-Azhari was born in Alexandria, Egypt, on 16 July 1976. He grew up in Sohag, Upper Egypt.

He graduated from the Faculty of Usul al-Din and Islamic Da'wah at Al-Azhar University in 1999. He obtained a master's degree in Hadith and its sciences in 2005 and a doctorate from the Faculty of Usul al-Din in 2011.

Alongside his formal education, al-Azhari studied Hadith, Quranic exegesis, Islamic jurisprudence, Arabic grammar and Islamic theology under senior scholars. He reportedly received ijazahs (authorisations to transmit religious knowledge) from more 300 scholars from different countries.

He is reported to have been a student of former Grand Mufti of Egypt Ali Gomaa.

== Career ==
=== Academic and religious career ===
Al-Azhari began his academic career as a teaching assistant in the Hadith department at Al-Azhar University's Faculty of Usul al-Din and Islamic Dawah in Asyut in 2000. He became assistant lecturer there in 2005 and later held similar position at universities faculty in Zagazig.

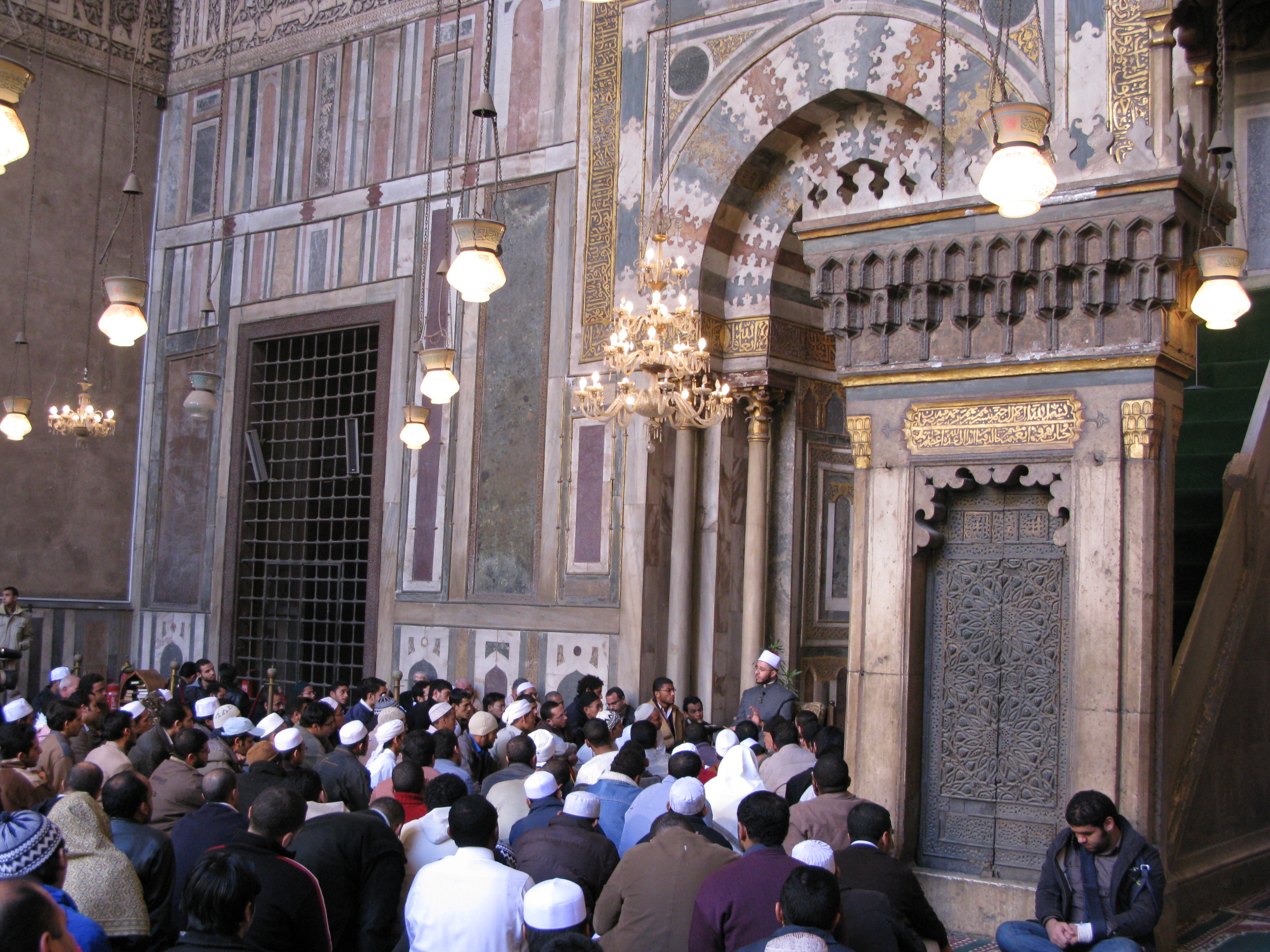
Al-Azhari delivering lecture at Sultan Hassan Mosque

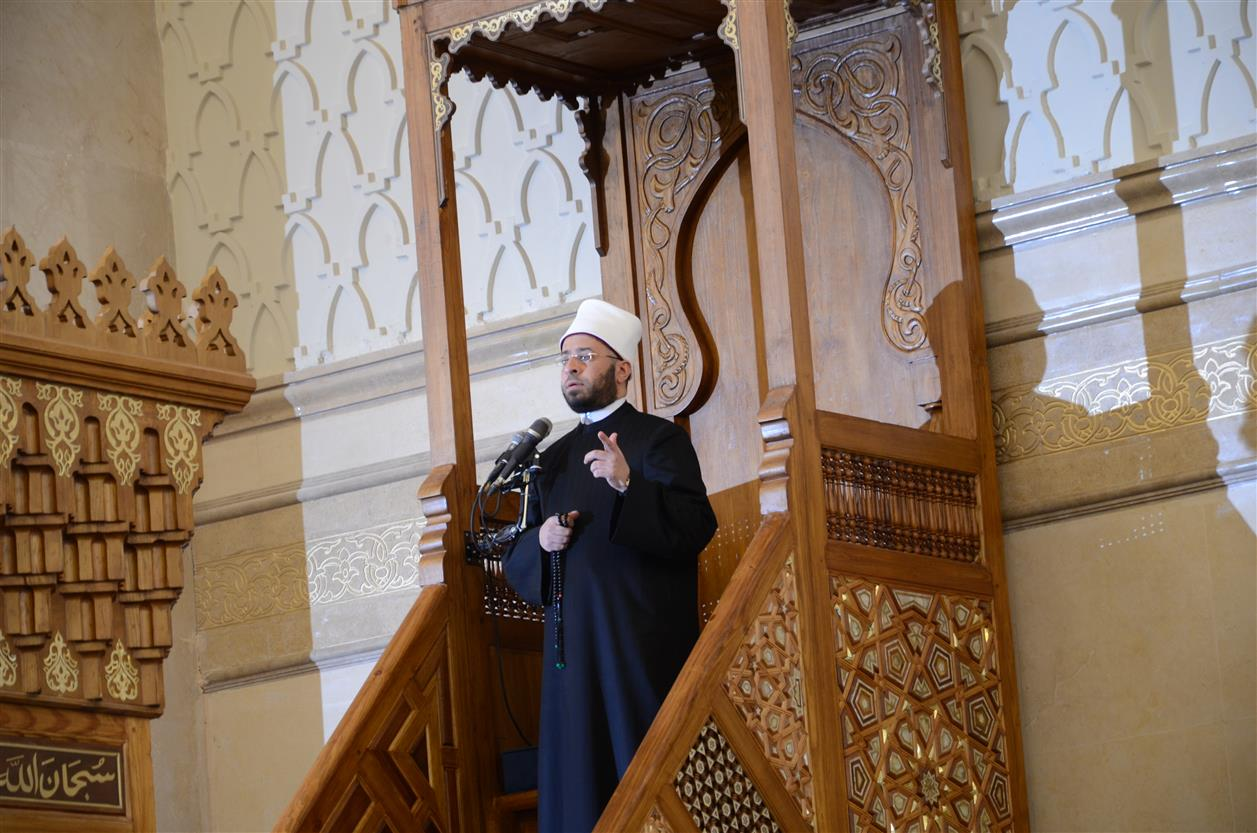
Al-Azhari delivering sermon at Al-Fattah al-Aleem Mosque in The New Capital

He has also taught Hadith, logic and Islamic creed at Al-Azhar Mosque in Cairo. He has authored works on Islamic scholarship and religious thought. He has also been a senior fellow at the Kalam Research and Media think tank. Between 2005 and 2009, al-Azhari was assigned by Grand Mufti of Egypt Ali Gomaa to deliver Friday sermons, and weekly lectures Islamic sciences at Sultan Hassan Mosque in Cairo.

In April 2023, al-Azhari delivered an online lecture organised by the World Muslim Communities Council on countering extremism and hatred among Muslim youth. He discussed the factors contributing to extremist ideologies including takfir (declaring someone disbeliever), and emphasised the role of Islamic scholarship in understanding Islamic Law.

In April 2024, Al-Azhar took part in an international conference on the Maturidi school of theology held in Samarkand, Uzbekistan. He spoke in the support of the Ash'ari and Maturidi traditions of Sunni Islam, describing them as approaches that combine religious texts with rational argument and help counter extremist interpretations. He also called for greater academic study of Maturidi theology and its engagement with contemporary ideas.

=== Political Career ===
In October 2014, he was appointed as a religious affairs adviser to President Abdel Fattah el-Sisi. In 2015, he was appointed to the Egyptian House of Representatives, where he served as deputy chairman of its Religious Affairs Committee until 2021.

== Minister of Religious Endowments ==
Al-Azhari was appointed Minister of Religious Endowments in July 2024, succeeding Muhammad Mukhtar Gomaa.

=== Religious initiatives ===
Al-Azhari has introduced initiatives aimed at improving the trainings of Imams and preachers, including women preachers, reviving traditional Quranic schools (kuttab) and renewing religious discourse.

In September 2024, al-Azhari said that he would work with Al-Azhar, Dar al-Ifta and parliament to reintroduce a bill restricting the issuing of fatwas to qualified scholars.

He has supported initiatives promoting Quranic recitation, including the television competition Dawlat al-Tilawa (State of Recitation), organised in collaboration with United Media Services (UMS). It premiered its first season in November 2025, attracting around 14,000 participants. He also attended the launch of its second season in July 2026, attracting around 25,000 participants.

=== Interfaith relations ===
In December 2024, al-Azhari visited the Coptic Orthodox Diocese of Beni Suef. He met Bishop Gabriel and discussed relations between Egypt's Muslim and Christian communities. In January 2025, he along with Grand Imam of Al-Azhar Ahmed el-Tayeb and other religious officials visited Pope Tawadros II to offer Christmas greetings. Al-Azhari. In March 2025, he received a delegation led by Andre Zaki, head of the Protestant community in Egypt, which visited to offer Eid al-Fitr greetings.

In 2026, al-Azhari met Coptic Catholic Patriarch Ibrahim Isaac Sidrak to discuss cooperation between the Ministry of Endowments and the newly established Catholic Church Endowments Authority.

=== International activities ===
In September 2024, al-Azhari attended the First Global Religious Summit in Saint Petersburg, Russia, where he led prayers at the city's Grand Mosque. He has also participated in initiatives to strengthen relations with Muslim communities abroad and received the Medal of Pride from the Mufti of Russia.

In April 2025, he visited Zagreb, Croatia, to participate in an international conference on the relationship between science, religion and artificial intelligence, organised by the Islamic Community of Croatia and other instititons.

In September 2026, Al-Azhari attended the conclusion of Egyptian-Philippine programme for religious leaders, which focused on dialogue, coexistence and cooperation between the two countries.

In November 2026, Al-Azhari met with Nasser ibn Musfer Al-Qurashi, chairman of the International Exhibitions and Museums of the Prophet's Biography and Islamic Civilization, to discuss joint scholarly and cultural projects using research and modern exhibition methods to present Muhammad's life and teachings.

=== Views on regional affairs ===
Al-Azhari led Egypt's hosting of the General Assembly of the Union of Arab Awqaf, where he expressed Egypt's opposition to forced displacement of Palestinians and supported the establishment of a Palestinian state within the 1967 borders. In March 2025, He also condemned Israel's action against aid delivery to the Gaza Strip.

== Controversies ==
In May 2023, footage of al-Azhari giving a lecture in Indonesia while seated on a chair carried on shoulders of crowd circulated on social media and drew criticism. Al-Azhari subsequently responded to the reaction in a statement on his Facebook page.

In January 2026, banners containing al-Azhari's photographs were displayed at the Sayyida Zainab Mosque in Cairo ahead of its annual celebration of Zaynab bint Ali's birthday. Their display drew criticism on social media, some object to the use of place of worship for official publicity. the Ministry of Endowments stated that the banners were intended to highlight state-sponsored events rather than promote the minister personally. Al-Azhari subsequently instructed to remove his photographs from the banners.

== Recognition ==
Al-Azhari has been included in The 500 Most Influential Muslims, an annual publication compiled by the Royal Islamic Strategic Studies Centre in Amman, Jordan. He was ranked 35th in the 2019 edition and has appeared in the publication's top 30 in subsequent years, 26th place in 2025, and 27th in both 2026 and 2027 editions.

== See also ==
- 2016 international conference on Sunni Islam in Grozny
- Ahmad Karima
- List of Ash'aris
- List of Sufis
