= Muhammad Siddiq Al-Minshawi =

Egyptian Quran reciter (1920–1969)

Shaykh Qari Muhammad Siddiq Al-Minshawi
- محمد صديق السيد تايب المنشاوي
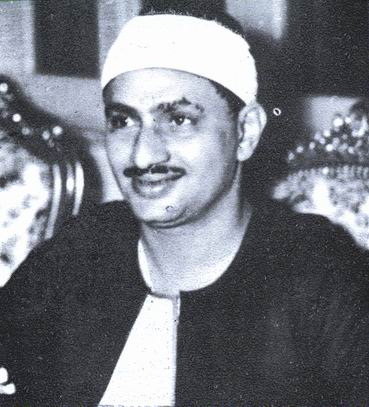
- Born: 20 January 1920; El-Mansha, Sohag Governorate, Sultanate of Egypt
- Died: 20 June 1969 (aged 49); Cairo, Egypt
- Resting place: El-Mansha, Sohag, Egypt
- Other name: al-Sawt al-Baki (The Weeping Voice)
- Known for: Expressive recitation of the Quran
- Father: Siddiq al-Minshawi

Religious life
- Religion: Islam
- Denomination: Sunni
- Profession: Qari
- Al-Minshawi's recitation recitation of Al-An'am verses 95–98

Muhammad Siddiq al-Minshawi (Note: Arabic: محمد صديق المنشاوي) (20 January 1920 – 20 June 1969), commonly known as al-Minshawi, was an Egyptian Quran reciter. He was appointed as a reciter on Egyptian Radio in 1953. He became known for his vocal style and emotionally expressive performance, which earned him the nickname al-Sawt al-Baki (Note: Arabic: الصوت الباكي) (lit. 'The Weeping Voice').

He is commonly grouped with Abdul Basit 'Abd us-Samad, Mustafa Ismail, Al-Hussary, and Mahmoud al-Banna as one of the five pillars of Egyptian Quran reciters of the 20th century who have an outsized impact on the Islamic World.

== Early life ==
=== Birth and family background ===
Al-Minshawi's father, Siddiq al-Minshawi

Muhammad Siddiq al-Minshawi was born on 20 January 1920 in El-Mansha, Sohag Governorate, in Upper Egypt. He was born into a family of Quran reciters. His father, Siddiq al-Sayed al-Minshawi (1895–1984), was a prominent reciter in Upper Egypt. His uncle, Ahmed al-Sayed, was also a reciter, as were his grandfather, al-Sayed Tayeb, and great-grandfather, Tayeb al-Minshawi, who also taught Quran.

Several members of his family later also became reciters, including his brothers, Ahmed (1930–1947) and Mahmoud (born 1943), and his nephew Siddiq Mahmoud (born 1974). The Family is often referred to as "Al-Minshawi Quranic Family".

=== Education ===
Al-Minshawi received early Quranic instruction from his father. He reportedly completed memorisation of the Quran at the age of eight at a traditional Quran school (kuttab) in his village, under the instruction of Muhammad al-Namki and Rushwan Abu Muslim.

At the age of twelve, he later moved to Cairo with his uncle Ahmed al-Sayed to study the rules of tajwid and Quran recitation (qira'at) under Muhammad Abu al-Ala and Muhammad al-Saudi. Al-Minshawi obtained ijazah (license to transmit) in the seven and then the ten canonical recitations of Quran from them.

== Career ==
Al-Minshawi began reciting publicly in the 1930s. His early performances took place primarily in Upper Egypt, where he recited at religious gatherings and other occasions, accompanied by his father and uncle. His recognition later extended beyond the region after he began reciting in mosques and other religious gatherings.

He also served as a reciter in several mosques, including the Zamalek Mosque in Zamalek, Cairo. Abdel Nasser reportedly invited al-Minshawi to recite at the funeral of his father in Alexandria in 1968.

=== Radio ===
Al-Minshawi's portrait in radio magazine in 1954, introducing him as a reciter.

According to accounts of his life, Egyptian Radio first sought to add him to its approved reciters, but he declined and was unable to travel to Cairo for an audition. Radio staff instead moved their equipment to Esna, in southern Egypt to record his recitations there. He was officially appointed as a reciter for Egyptian Radio in 1953, Some accounts state that his appointment was made without a formal audition.

Al-Minshawi recorded the complete Quran according to the narration of Hafs 'an Asim. He also recorded recitations according to other narrations including Shu'bah 'an Asim, Al-Duri 'an Abu Amr, Warsh and Qalun.

In 1965, he recorded the complete Quran in murattal style across 82 tapes. The recordings were reviewed and approved by a committee, however, after listening them himself, al-Minshawi found some parts that needed adjustments and requested that 32 tapes be recorded again. He reportedly undertook to make the new recordings without additional payment. The revised recordings were subsequently approved in 1967 but remained in the archives from that year onwards. In June 2026, Holy Quran Radio began broadcasting the unreleased recordings.

=== International visits ===
Al-Minshawi travelled to many countries to recite the Quran at religious gatherings and in prominent mosques there. His visits included Indonesia, Jordan, Palestine, Kuwait, Libya, Saudi Arabia, Pakistan and Syria among other countries.

In November 1955, visited Indonesia alongside fellow Egyptian reciter Abdul Basit 'Abd us-Samad. Both recited on Radio Republik Indonesia. He also visited Syria during the 1950s, where he performed at the Umayyad Mosque in Damascus. In 1959, he recited there in the presence of Egyptian president Gamal Abdel Nasser.

Al-Minshawi also visited Al-Aqsa in Jerusalem on several occasions and reportedly had a particular attachment to the site. His visits ceased after 1967 Arab–Israel War.

== Recitation style ==
Al-Minshawi is described as generally reciting in Nahawand maqam. He also used to Rast and Hijazi maqams when performing the call to prayer (adhan). His recitation style was characterised by an expressive delivery, often described as sorrowful or emotional, earning him the nickname al-Sawt al-Baki (lit. 'The Weeping Voice'). He recorded in both mujawwad (melodic) and murattal (measured) styles.

His style of Quran recitation has also been dubbed as the "Minshawi School [of recitation]".

== Personal life ==
Al-Minshawi married twice. His first wife was named Bahiyyah, and his second wife was Na'ima, who died in 1968 while performing the Hajj pilgrimage.

He had total of twelve children, his six sons included, al-Saudi, named after his teacher, Omar, Mohamed Nour, Mohamed el-Shafi'i, Salah, and Tarek. One of his six daughters was named Fadia.

Al-Minshawi had a mosque built in his home village, working with a Christian friend. The mosque was named after al-Minshawi's father.

== Illness and death ==
In 1966, al-Minshawi developed a throat ailment, described as oesophageal varices, which affected his ability to recite. Doctors reportedly advised him to limit vocal strain, although he continued reciting for some time.

During his illness, he was admitted to Maadi Hospital in Cairo. Gamal Abdel Nasser reportedly ordered his transfer to London for treatment at state expenses.

Al-Minshawi died on 20 June 1969 at Maadi hospital, aged 49. His funeral took place in his hometown in Sohag, where he was buried.

== Recognition and Legacy ==
Al-Minshawi is regarded as one of the prominent Egyptian Quran reciters of the 20th century. His recordings remain available through radio archives and digital platforms, and his recitation style continues to be studied and followed by other reciters.

- In 1955, Al-Minshawi received the Order of Merit, First Class, from Indonesian President Sukarno.
- Around 1960s, he reportedly received Order of Merit, Second Class, from Syria.
- In 1992, during Laylat al-Qadr, Al-Minshawi was posthumously awarded Egyptian Order of Sciences and Arts, First Class, by President Hosni Mubarak, and a street in Giza was named after him.
- The ant species, Temnothorax elmenshawyi, described in 2019 from the Asir Mountains of Saudi Arabia, was named in honour of al-Minshawy.
- In May 2024, the Sheikh Mohamed Siddiq El-Menshawy Axis, also known as the Manfalut Axis, a 41-kilometer road and bridge crossing the Nile in Asyut Governorate, was inaugurated by President Abdel Fattah el-Sisi. It was named after al-Minshawy.
- In December 2024, the Holy Quran Academy in Sharjah, United Arab Emirates, received his son Omar al-Minshawi. During the visit, academy president Khalifa Musabeh al-Tunaiji and Omar discussed the preservation and presentation of Muhammad Siddiq al-Minshawi's legacy.
