= Centenary Celebration of Darul Uloom Deoband =

History of Darul Uloom Deoband

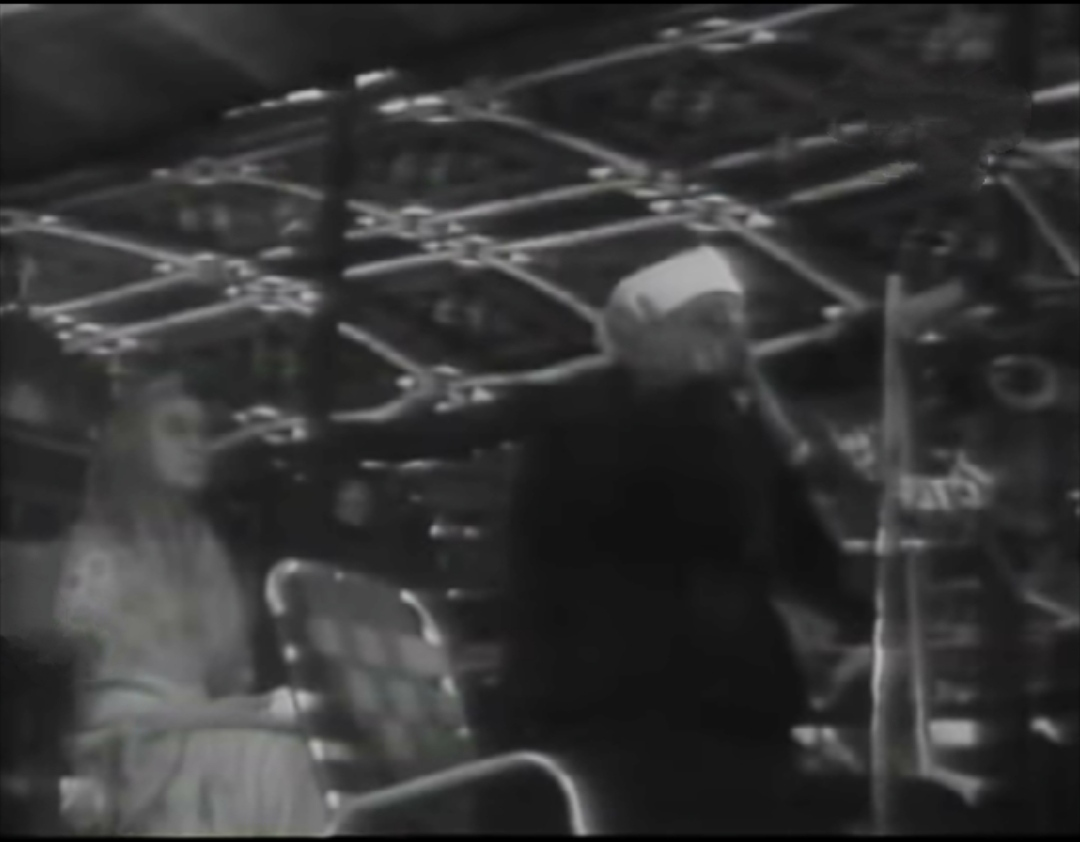
- At the beginning of the centennial conference, Egypt's Qari Abdul Basit 'Abd us-Samad recited from the Quran, with former Prime Minister of India Indira Gandhi in the background
- Begins: March 21, 1980
- Ends: March 23, 1980
- Venue: Darul Uloom Deoband
- Locations: Deoband, Uttar Pradesh, India
- Coordinates: 29.6982495°N 77.6760821°E
- Country: India
- Participants: 1.5 to 2 million
- Area: 100 hectares (250 acres)
- Patron: Government of India
- Organiser: Darul Uloom Deoband
- Website: darululoom-deoband.com

Darul Uloom Deoband is a Madrasa located in Saharanpur district of Uttar Pradesh, India, established on 30 May 1866. Its centennial conference was held on 21, 22 and 23 March 1980. The conference was inaugurated by Abdallah Ben Abdel Mohsen At-Turki, the representative of the Saudi Arabian king, and included Quran recitation by Abdul Basit 'Abd us-Samad from Egypt, an opening speech by the Madrasa's rector, Qari Muhammad Tayyib, and a speech by the Indian Prime Minister, Indira Gandhi. The conference concluded with a prayer by Qari Muhammad Tayyib and was broadcast live on the All India Radio. A 100 hectares area was prepared for the conference, with the number of participants ranging from 1.5 to 2 million, including 18,000 participants from outside the Indian subcontinent. In this gathering, more than ten thousand Madrasa graduates are awarded with honorary turban. In addition to supporting the Afghan mujahideen, the conference also included several initiatives against the Russian invasion in Afghanistan through the efforts of Minnatullah Rahmani. Alongside the main conference, a special seminar was organized to discuss the responsibilities and curriculum of the madrasa at Darul Hadith.

== Background ==
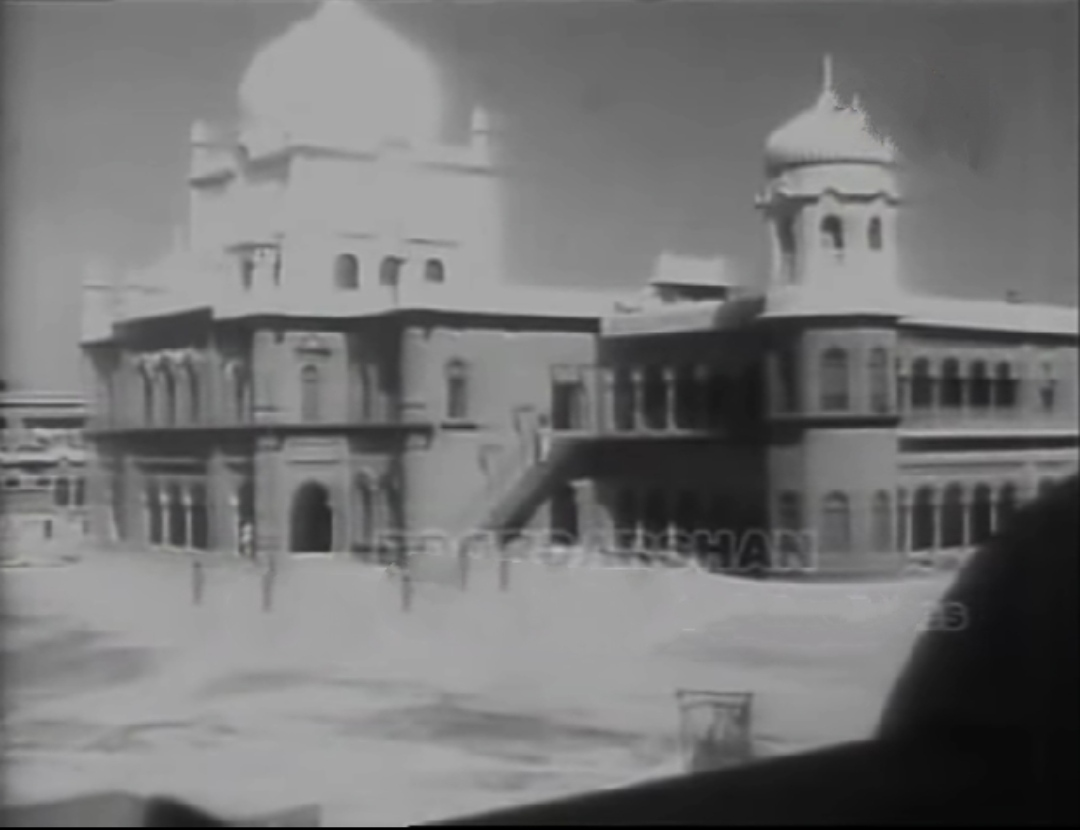
Darul Uloom Deoband in 1980

In 1949, at a meeting in Darul Uloom Deoband, the centennial conference was proposed by Hifzur Rahman Seoharwi and Manzoor Nomani in the lifetime of Hussain Ahmad Madani, the purpose was to send a message to the government about the importance of Darul Uloom Deoband in the aftermath of the Partition of India. Prior to this, such a conference had been held in undivided India in April 1910. Finally, decisions were made at the end of the meeting, and an office was opened for this purpose. However, this conference cannot be organized for various reasons.

In 1975, the centennial celebration of Darul Uloom Deoband's sister institution, Darul Uloom Nadwatul Ulama, was held. As a result of the event, the decisions of the Deoband Conference held on 21, 22, and 23 March 1980, were also widely publicized. The governments of India and Pakistan provided special facilities for participants in the conference through an agreement. The Government of Pakistan arranged a special train from Lahore to Attock, and the Government of India started a special train from Attock to Deoband. Additionally, the Government of India published a commemorative stamp.

== Venue ==
An area of one million square meters is prepared for this conference. The area of the pandal was 6 lakh square feet. The stage is 10 feet high and 150x150 feet wide. There are 400 guests on the stage and 150 journalist chairs on both sides. The gathering place starts from the western rail line and goes to the garden two and a half miles away in the east. GT Road is the northern boundary and Eidgah is the southern boundary. Camps are set up outside for incoming guests. Separate camps are set up for guests from each area, and boards are placed with the names of each area. Hand pumps are installed every three hundred yards for water. The food stalls are located in the north. Three lakh people sit under the shamiana, and the same amount of space is left outside the shamiana as an open field. The camps for those who stay overnight are behind them.

== General Session ==
=== First session ===
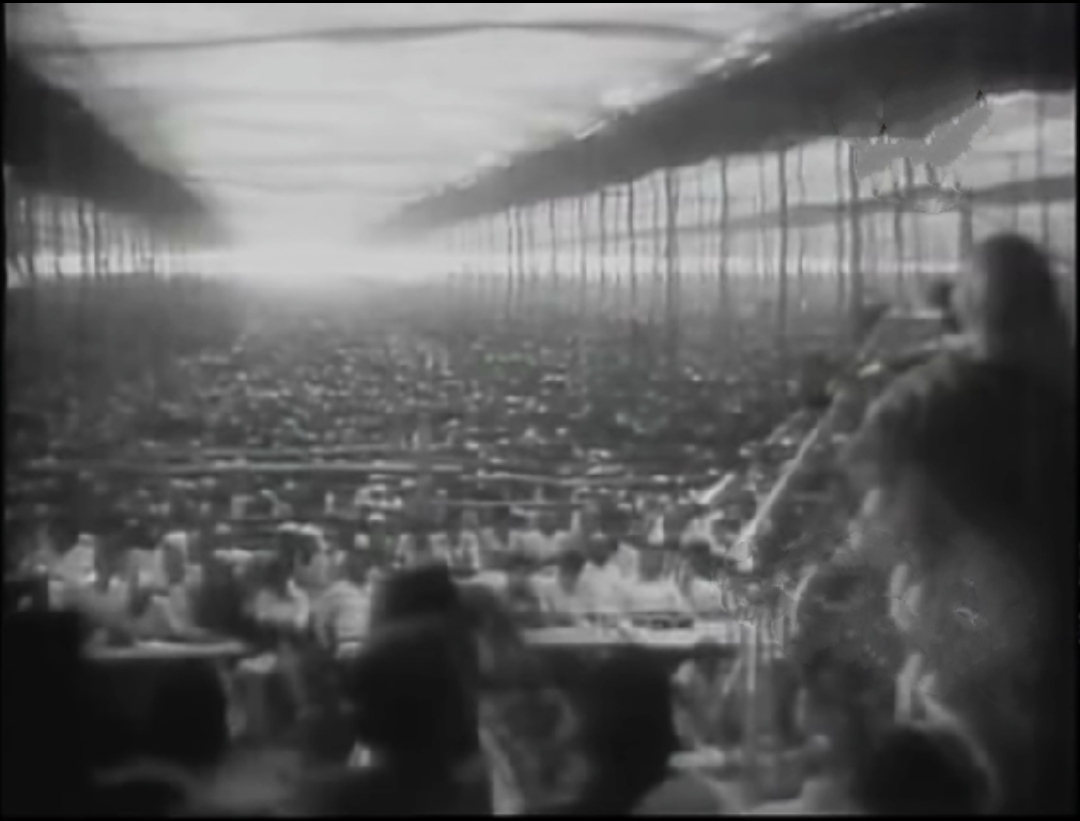
Audience with Indira Gandhi at Centenary Celebration of Darul Uloom Deoband

On 21 March 1980, the first session began at 2:00 pm after Jumma prayer. A running commentary of this first session was broadcast by All India Radio, New Delhi. Khalid of Saudi Arabia, King of Saudi Arabia's special representative, and delegation leader Abdallah Ben Abdel Mohsen At-Turki from Saudi Arabia were the chairman of this inaugural session. Kuwait's Minister of Awqaf Yusuf Al-Hadji inaugurated it. Six representative teams from Saudi Arabia participated in the event. While one representative from the Saudi Arabian government was nominated by King Khalid, the other five representative teams were formed with significant personalities from international organizations and universities, including Saudi Arabia's Crown Prince Fahd who sent a message. Representatives from Jordan's King, Oman's Sultan, Egypt's President Sadat (led by Kuwait's Minister Abdul Al-Munim Al-Namareh), Iraq, Kuwait, Libya, Sri Lanka, and Nepal also participated in the event. A delegation from the Islamic organizations of the United Kingdom and Syed Ehtesham Qazimi from the United States also attended. The first session of this general session was inaugurated by the recitation of Quran by renowned contemporary reciter Abdul Basit 'Abd us-Samad.

=== Second session ===
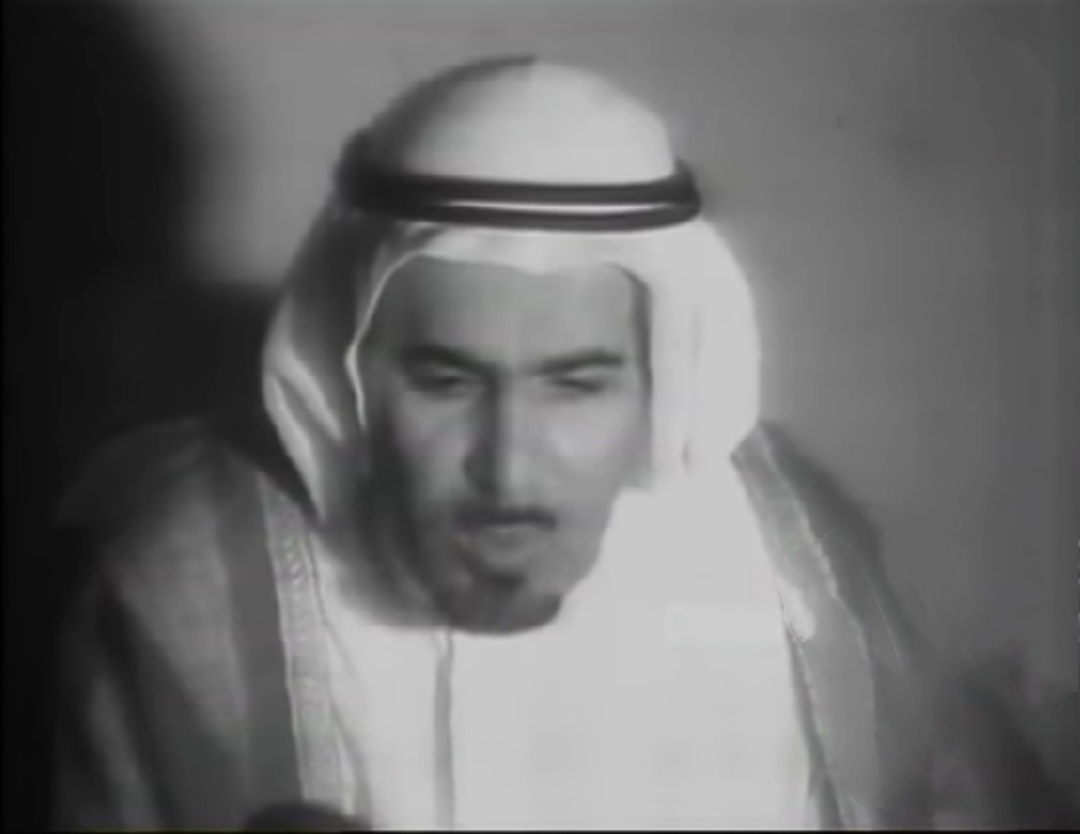
Representative of Kuwait at Centenary Celebration of Darul Uloom Deoband

The second session started at 9 pm on March 21 and ended at 1 am. The session began after recitation of the Quran. Yusuf Al-Hadji, the Minister of Awqaf of the Kuwaiti government, chaired the session, and Yusuf al-Qaradawi was the co-chair.

=== Third session ===
On the next day, March 22, the program of the third session started at 9am and ended at 1:30pm. The vice-chancellor of Islamic University of Madinah, Abdullah Al-Jayed, was a bit late for the session and until his arrival, the chairman of the session was Abul Hasan Ali Hasani Nadwi. The program started with Quran recitation. In this session, the written statement of the President of India, Neelam Sanjiva Reddy, was read out by Qari Muhammad Tayyib. Then the Chief Minister of Pakistan's Khyber Pakhtunkhwa, Mufti Mehmood, gave a speech. Afterwards, a written statement of the President of Pakistan, Muhammad Zia-ul-Haq, was read out.

=== Forth session ===
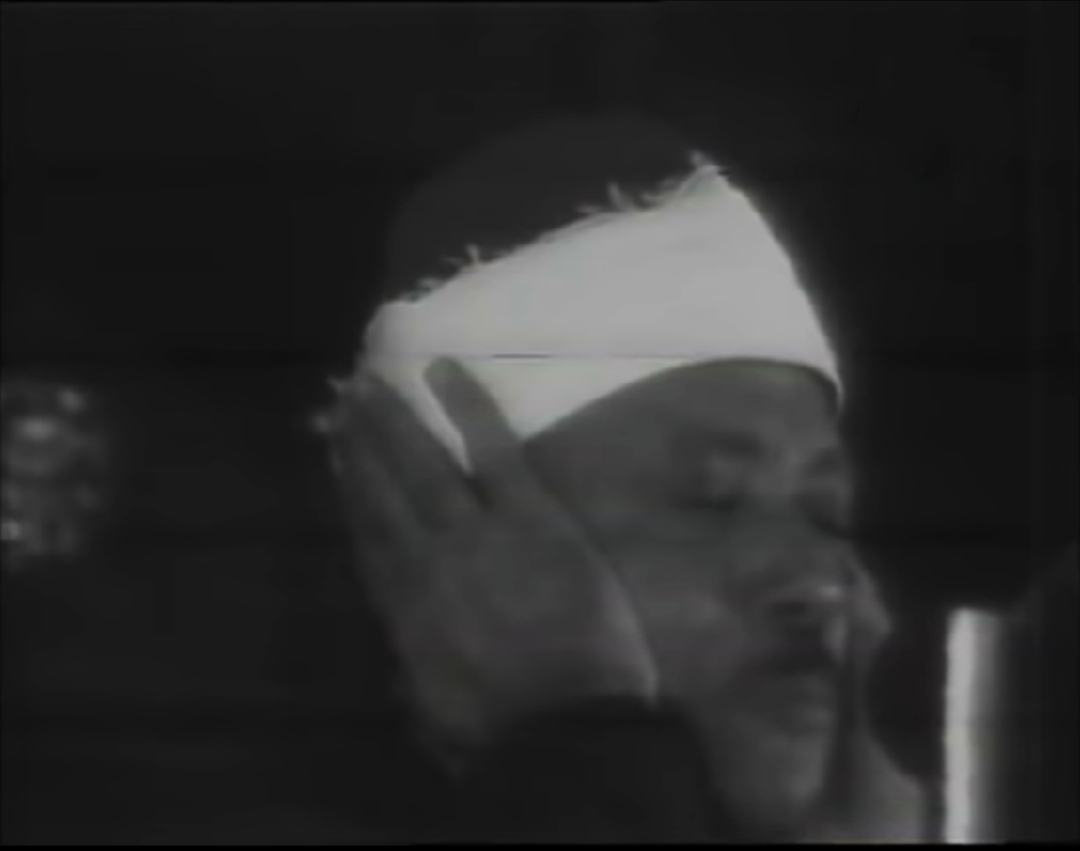
Abdul Basit 'Abd us-Samad at Centenary Celebration of Darul Uloom Deoband

The program of the fourth session started at 3 pm on 22 March. In this session, Abdul Basit 'Abd us-Samad recited the Quran for one and a half hours.

=== Fifth session ===
The fifth session began at 9 pm on 22 March and ended at 12:30 am. Maulana Golamullah chaired this session.

=== Sixth session ===
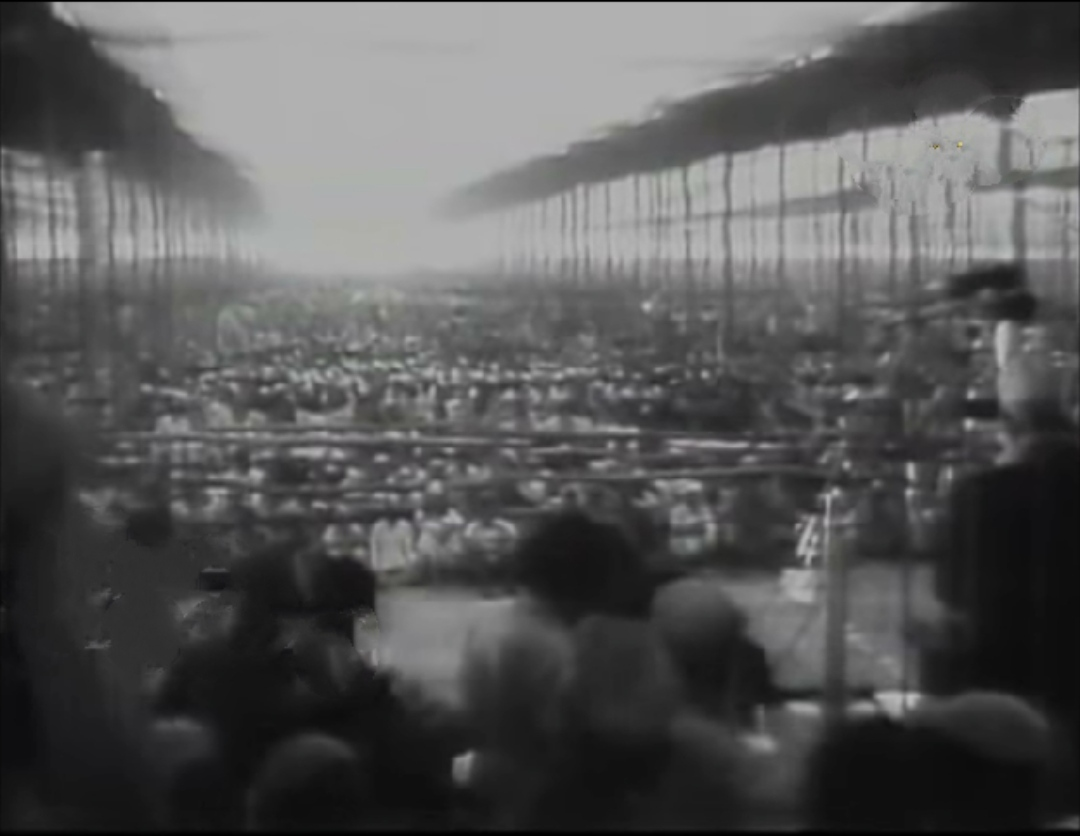
Audience and Qari Muhammad Tayyib at Centenary Celebration of Darul Uloom Deoband

On 23 March at 8:30 PM, the sixth and final session began, which ended at 1:30 PM. The program started with recitation of the Quran. Several people recited poetry, expressing their admiration for the success of the centennial conference and the historic service of Darul Uloom Deoband. Speakers included Qari Muhammad Tayyib and Asad Madani. A representative from Russia issued a statement, and India's former Deputy Prime Minister Jagjivan Ram was also a speaker.

== Special seminar ==
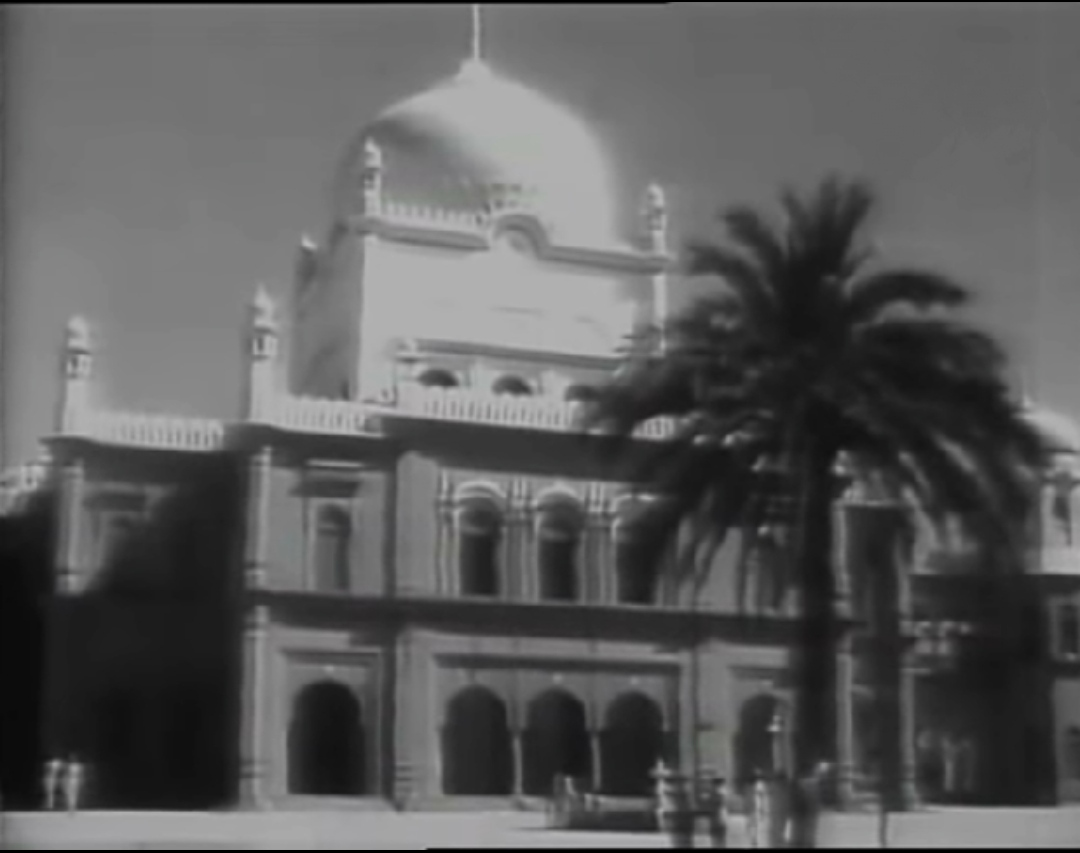
Darul Hadith, Darul Uloom Deoband in 1980

During the centennial celebration, a special seminar was arranged at Darul Uloom's Darul Hadith. The subject of the seminar was religious madrasas and their responsibilities in the current era, including the curriculum. Two sessions were held with Saeed Ahmad Akbarabadi and Abul Hasan Ali Hasani Nadwi as the chairmen. The first session began at 3 pm on 22 March. and the second session started after the evening prayer. Zayn al-Abidin Sajjad Meerthi conducted the program.

== Aftermath ==
After the centenary celebration conference, disagreements arose between the rector of Darul Uloom Deoband, Qari Muhammad Tayyib, and Majlis-e Shura, the management committee of the madrasa. As part of the opposition, Muhammad Tayyib announced the dissolution of the madrasa's constitution and the management committee in a general meeting in Delhi and formed an ad hoc committee. In contrast, a few of Muhammad Tayyib's followers established a parallel madrasa in the Jamia Masjid of Deoband, which is now known as Darul Uloom Waqf. The accumulated funds of Darul Uloom were frozen. Muhammad Tayyib died on July 17, 1983.

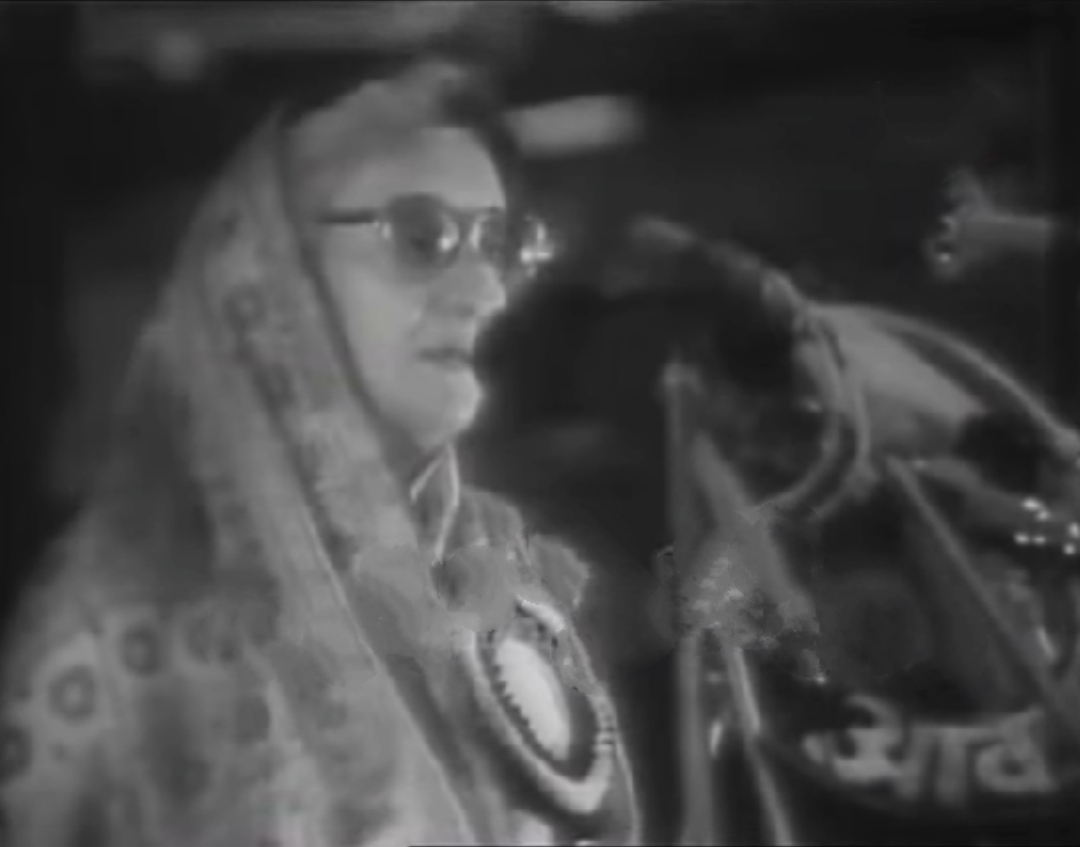
Indira Gandhi at Centenary Celebration of Darul Uloom Deoband

In this conference, Indian prime minister Indira Gandhi participated in the first session. Criticism was focused on the participation of a female prime minister in an Islamic conference. Pakistani Islamic scholar Taqi Usmani wrote in his book titled "Muslim Tourists in Non-Muslim Countries" that,

Indira Gandhi's participation in this gathering was undoubtedly a tragic incident. However, initially the news was completely misleading and provocative in that it was reported that she had started the conference. The actual incident was that she participated in the gathering as a regular speaker. Her presence was not at the behest of the administrators of Darul Uloom. Rather, her presence was due to her own decision.

—

== See also ==
- List of Darul Uloom Deoband alumni
- Bibliography of Darul Uloom Deoband
