= El Fashn =

El Fashn ⲡⲃⲏϣⲛ
- City
- Location in Egypt
- Coordinates: 28.822718°N 30.899205°E
- Country: Egypt
- Governorate: Beni Suef

Area
  - Total: 16.1 km^{2} (6.2 sq mi)
- Elevation: 100 m (330 ft)

Population (2023)
  - Total: 121,675
  - Density: 7,560/km^{2} (19,600/sq mi)
- Demonym(s): Fashni (Male, Arabic: فشني) Fashniyah (Female, Arabic: فشنية)
- Time zone: UTC+2 (EET)
  - Summer (DST): UTC+3 (EEST)

El Fashn (Arabic: الفشن, from Coptic: ⲡⲃⲏϣⲛ, lit. 'the castle') is a city in Egypt. It is situated near the southern borders of Beni Suef Governorate.

The city was called Phebichis (Ancient Greek: Φεβιχις) in Ptolemaic and Byzantine Egypt.

== Subdivisions ==
Al-Fashn contains many villages, the most important are: Talat, one of the largest villages in the district, Manshiyat Amr, Al-Fent Al-Sharqiya, Al-Fent Al-Gharbiya, Al-Jamhud, Delhans, Shenri, Al-Sharahna, as well as Al-Barqi, Nazlat Al-Barqi, Bani Saleh, Al-Shaqr, Al-Qudabi, Sharaara, Aqfahs, and Nazlat Aqfahs, as well as the villages of Saft Al-Arfa and Saft Al-Nour.

== See also ==
- List of cities and towns in Egypt
