= Muhammad Mukhtar Gomaa =

Egyptian writer (born 1966)

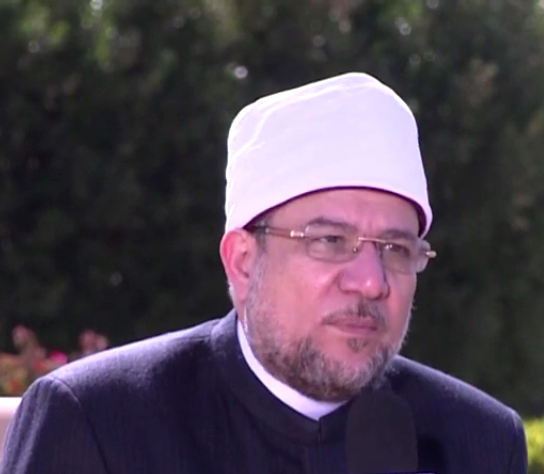

Minister of Religious Endowment
- Incumbent
- Assumed office July 2013
- Succeeded by: Osama al-Azhari

Personal details
- Born: 1966 (age 59–60) Beni Suef Governorate, Egypt
- Education: Al Azhar University

Muhammad Mukhtar Gomaa (Arabic: محمد مختار جمعة ;born 1966) is the former Egyptian Minister of Religious Endowments, holding office from July 2013 to 2 July 2024. He is also the elected Dean of the Faculty of Islamic Studies at Al-Azhar University and a member of the Technical Office of the Grand Imam of Al-Azhar.
