= Mahmud Ali al-Banna =

Egyptian Quran reciter (1926–1985)

Qari Mahmud Ali al-Banna
- محمود علي البنا
- al-Banna in 1979
- Born: 17 December 1926; Shibin El Kom, Monufia Governorate, Kingdom of Egypt
- Died: 20 July 1985 (aged 58); Cairo, Egypt
- Occupations: Deputy head of Egyptian Syndicate of Quran reciters, Qari at Al-Hussein Mosque

Religious life
- Religion: Islam
- Denomination: Sunni
- Profession: Qari

Mahmud Ali al-Banna (Note: Arabic: محمود علي البنا, also spelled as Mahmoud Ali el-Banna) (17 December 1926 – 20 July 1985) was an Egyptian Quran reciter. He was known for his radio broadcasts and recordings of Quranic recitation and served as a reciter at several prominent mosques in Egypt. He also participated in the establishment of Egyptian Syndicate of Quran Reciters, serving as its deputy head after its formation in 1984.

== Early life ==
Al-Banna was born on 17 December 1926 in the village of Shubra Bas, in the Shibin El Kom of Monufia Governorate, Kingdom of Egypt. He memorised the Quran at the village's traditional Quran school (kuttab) under the instruction of Musa al-Mantash, reportedly completing his memorisation at the age of eleven.

He subsequently moved to Tanta to study Islamic religious sciences, at the Ahmad al-Badawi Mosque. There he studied the Quranic readings (qira'at) under Ibrahim ibn Salam al-Malaki

== Career ==
=== Early career and Egyptian radio ===
Al-Banna moved to Cairo in 1945, where he continued his recitational studies under Darwish al-Hariri, a teacher of maqamat (Arabic musical modes). In 1947, he was appointed reciter for the Egyptian Society of Muslim Youth, where performed at the organisation's ceremonies and events.

In 1948, al-Banna recited at an event attended by Ali Mahir Pasha, Abd el-Krim el-Khattabi, and other notable attendees. Following the performance, he was encouraged to join Egyptian Radio. He joined the broadcaster that year, and his first live radio recitation took place in December 1948, when he recited passages from Surah Hud.

His radio appearances and recordings contributed to his recognition as a Quran reciter in Egypt.

=== Mosque appointments ===
President Anwar Sadat shaking hands with Mahmud Ali al-Banna in Desouk in May 1979

In the late 1940s, al-Banna was appointed reciter at Ain al-Hayat Mosque in Cairo. During the 1950s, he served as a reciter at Imam al-Rifa'i Mosque.

In 1959, he moved to Ahmad al-Badawi Mosque in Tanta, where he remained until 1980. He then became a reciter at Al-Hussein Mosque in Cairo, a position he held until his death.

=== Recordings and international visits ===
Al-Banna recorded Quran recitations for Egyptian Radio. His recorded works included a murattal recitation of the Quran, completed in 1967, and a mujawwad recitation. He also recorded murattal recitations for broadcasters in Saudi Arabia and the United Arab Emirates.

He travelled to numerous countries to recite the Quran, including countries across the Arab world and Europe. His performance included appearance at the Masjid al-Haram in Mecca, the Prophet's Mosque in Medina, the Al-Aqsa Mosque in Jerusalem and the Umayyad Mosque in Damascus. In 1978, he visited Germany.

== Reciter's union ==
Al-Banna participated in efforts to establish a professional syndicate for Quran reciters in Egypt. Following the formation of the syndicate in 1984, he was appointed its deputy head.

== Death and legacy ==
Al-Banna died on 20 July 1985. His funeral prayer was held at Imam al-Hussein Mosque in Cairo, after which his body was transferred to his home village of Shubra Bas in Monufia Governorate.

In 1990, Egyptian President Hosni Mubarak awarded al-Banna the Order of Sciences and Arts. His eldest son, Shafiq Mahmoud Ali al-Banna, received the award on his behalf.

A street in Tanta near Ahmad al-Badawi Mosuqe was named after al-Banna by the governorate authorities.
