= Ministry of Endowments (Egypt) =

Government ministry of Egypt

Coordinates: 30°2′31″N 31°13′57″E

Arab Republic of Egypt Ministry of Endowments
- Emblem of Egypt

Agency overview
- Jurisdiction: Government of Egypt
- Headquarters: New Administrative Capital, Cairo Governorate
- Minister responsible: Osama al-Azhari, Minister of Religious Endowment of Egypt
- Website: Official website

The Ministry of Endowments of Egypt (Arabic: وزارة الأوقاف المصرية, lit. 'Ministry of Awqaf of Egypt') is one of the ministries in the Egyptian government and is in charge of religious endowments. Religious endowments, awqaf, are similar to common law trusts where the trustee is the mosque or individual in charge of the waqf and the beneficiary is usually the community as a whole. Examples of waqfs are of a plot of land, a market, a hospital, or any other building that would aid the community.

== History ==
=== Before the nationalization of awqaf ===
Before the nationalization of the awqaf, the mosques helped in lending the poorer citizens a voice. For example, Al-Azhar mosque would aid the community through the endowments and remained economically separate via the revenue they earned from the awqaf. This enabled the mosque to maintain a state of independence from the dictates of the government and rulers. Mosques could use the endowments to help the community as needed. Also, because mosques were economically independent, imams could preach what they felt was important, with little to no government intervention. However, when the government effectively took over the endowments program, the people suffered greatly. They no longer had their only means of political representation and Al-Azhar's religious influence was manipulated into producing propaganda by the state.

=== Nationalization of awqaf ===
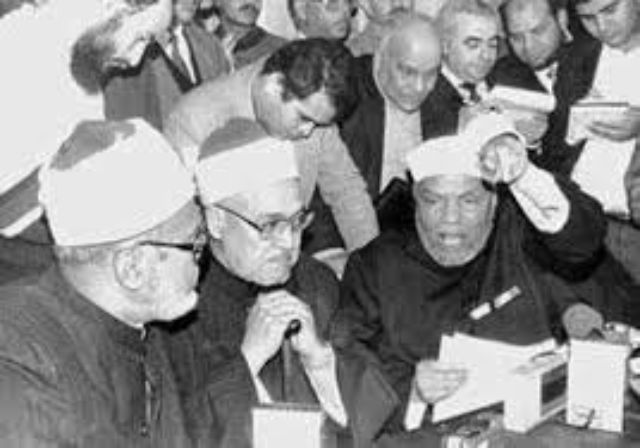
Alsharawi in the Ministry of Awqaf, 1978

The first Egyptian leader to nationalize the awqaf was Muhammad Ali. He began the precedent of bringing the endowments under state control. His successors continued the process and by the time King Fuad I was in power, Al-Azhar carried out the government's wishes. When the king desired to be caliph some "…Al-Azhar sheikhs were ready to provide the necessary pronouncements" (Ibrahim 636). Endowments were considered a part of the state when Gamal Abdel Nasser nationalized them in 1952. Gamal Abdel Nasser used the newly created propaganda machine of Al-Azhar to "…justify Arab Socialism and his struggle against Israel" (Ibrahim 636). Anwar Sadat continued Nasser's policies of using Al-Azhar for the "…sake of justifying opposing policies, including his treaty with Israel" (Ibrahim 637).

This process arguably twisted what was once a community-benefitting mosque, into a corrupt political machine; and with the Ministry of Awqaf promoting rationalism rather than supporting the cause of the poor. In 1977 Jamaat al Muslimin, a guerrilla Islamic group that rose out of the Muslim Brotherhood, killed the former Minister of Awqaf, Muhammad al-Dhahabi, after the arrest of its members. The Ministry of Awqaf and the mosques, was in the eyes of much of the public a tool of the state, and because the mosques were now under the state's economic control, the imams were effectively employees of the state. The government, for the first time, now had the authority to dictate to the imams and the mosque what could or could not be preached.

=== Dar al-Kiswa ===
In 1953 the ministry took control of the Dar al-Kiswa al-Sharifa ("house of the noble kiswa"), an artistic workshop on the al-Khoronfesh street in Cairo. Founded in 1817, the Dar al-Kiswa was responsible for producing textiles for the holy sites of Mecca and Medina. It was named after the kiswa, the embroidered covering for the Kaaba which is replaced annually. From 1962 onwards the textiles were made in Mecca. The staff of the Cairo workshop declined to a small number, and the workshop officially closed in 1997. The building is now used by the ministry as a storage space.

=== Present day ===
The deposed President Hosni Mubarak followed the precedent of his predecessors in keeping the establishment of awqaf nationalized. The government today aims to moderate the tone of the mosques and retains the ability to do so by means of the ministry. Mahmoud Hamdy Zakzouk served as minister from 1995 to 2011. The ministry also serves as an archives center for various awqaf legal documents over the past hundreds of years.

== Crime at awqaf mosques ==
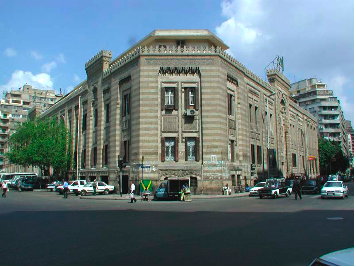
Awqaf ministry building

In the year 2008 growing concern erupted in Egypt over the increase of thefts from Awqaf mosques in Egypt, such as Ganim Al Bahlawan and Altinbugha Al-Maridani mosques, where inlaid wood panels from the minbars were stolen. Thieves were also caught trying to steal an ironwork grill window from the sabil kuttab of Rokaya Dudu. The Supreme Council of Antiquities (SCA) blamed the Ministry of Awqaf for the incidents, stating that the role of the SCA is only to restore mosques and give then back to the Awqaf, who are then in charge of security. Yet, legally the SCA is in charge of security of monuments and archaeological sites. In 2017, it was decided that some mosque artifacts would be stored at SCA warehouses, for security reasons.

== Ministers ==
Supervisor of Awqaf

- Ali Pasha Mubarak – 28 August 1878 – 23 February 1879
- Mohamed Thabet Pasha – 7 April 1879 – 5 July 1879
- Mahmoud Sami al-Baroudi Pasha – 5 July 1879 – 18 August 1879
- Mohamed Zaki Pasha – 14 September 1881 – 4 February 1882; 21 August 1882 – 10 January 1884
- Vacant – 10 January 1884 – 9 June 1888
- Hassan Shariei Pasha – 4 February 1882 – 26 May 1882
- Mohamed Moheb Pasha – 5 April 1914 – 19 December 1914

Minister of Awqaf

- Ismail Sidqi Pasha – 19 December 1914 – 20 May 1915
- Ibrahim Fathi Pasha – 20 May 1915 – 9 October 1917
- Ahmed Ziwar Pasha – 19 December 1917 – 9 April 1919
- Jaafar Wali Pasha – 9 April 1919 – 22 April 1919; 1 March 1922 – 29 November 1922; 25 June 1928 – 2 October 1929
- Mohamed Tawfik Naseem Pasha – 20 May 1919 – 20 November 1919
- Hussein Darwish Bey – 20 November 1919 – 21 May 1920
- Ahmed Medhat Yeghen Pasha – 16 March 1921 – 24 December 1921
- Mohamed Ibrahim Pasha – 30 November 1922 – 9 February 1923
- Ahmed Ali Pasha – 15 March 1923 – 27 January 1924; 3 October 1929 – 1 January 1930; 22 June 1931 – 4 January 1933; 30 January 1936 – 9 May 1936
- Ahmed Mazloum Pasha – 28 January 1924 – 31 March 1924
- Mohamed Naguib al-Ghorabli Effendi – 31 March 1924 – 24 November 1924
- Mohamed Sidqi Pasha – 24 November 1924 – 13 March 1925
- Muhammad Ali Alluba – 13 March 1925 – 12 September 1925
- Mohamed Tawfiq Rifaat Pasha (acting) – 12 September 1925 – 30 November 1925
- Mohamed Tawfiq Rifaat Pasha – 30 November 1925 – 7 May 1926
- Mohamed Naguib al-Ghorabli Pasha – 7 June 1926 – 21 April 1927
- Mahmoud Bassiouni Effendi – 1 January 1930 – 19 June 1930
- Mohamed Helmy Issa Pasha – 19 June 1930 – 10 June 1931; 30 December 1937 – 27 April 1938
- Ali Gamal al-Din Pasha – 10 June 1931 – 22 June 1931
- Mohamed Mostafa Pasha – 4 January 1933 – 13 March 1933
- Ali al-Manzalawi Bey – 13 March 1933 – 27 September 1933
- Abdel Aziz Mohamed Bey – 14 November 1934 – 30 January 1936
- Mohamed Safwat Pasha – 9 May 1936 – 1 August 1937
- Mahmoud Bassiouni – 1 August 1937 – 30 December 1937
- Mohamed Helmy Issa Pasha – 30 December 1937 – 27 April 1938
- Mustafa Abdel Razek Bey – 27 April 1938 – 24 June 1938; 27 June 1940 – 14 November 1940
- Abdul Rahman Hassan Azzam – 18 August 1939 – 27 June 1940
- Ibrahim Desouki Abaza Pasha – 16 February 1946 – 9 December 1946; 25 July 1949 – 3 November 1949
- Mohamed Ali Alluba Pasha – 9 December 1946 – 3 March 1947
- Ali Abdel Raziq – 3 March 1947 – 28 December 1948
- Mohamed El-Mofti El-Gezairli Bey – 3 November 1949 – 12 January 1950
- Yassin Ahmed Pasha – 12 January 1950 – 27 January 1952
- Saad El-Labban – 27 January 1952 – 1 March 1952
- Mohamed El-Mofti El-Gezairli Pasha – 1 March 1952 – 2 July 1952; 22 July 1952 – 23 July 1952
- Sheikh Mohamed Ahmed Farag El-Sanhouri – 2 July 1952 – 22 July 1952
- Fouad Chérine Pasha – 24 July 1952 – 7 September 1952
- Ahmed Hassan El-Baqouri – 8 September 1951 – 20 September 1960
- Ahmed Abdallah Tuaima – 20 September 1960 – 28 September 1961
- Hussein el-Shafei – 18 October 1961 – 29 September 1962; 19 June 1967 – 20 March 1968
- Mohamed El-Behi – 29 September 1962 – 25 March 1964
- Ahmed Abdo El-Sharbasi – 25 March 1964 – 30 September 1965
- Ahmed Mohamed Khalifa – 10 September 1966 – 18 June 1967
- Abdel Aziz Kamel – 28 October 1968 – 18 November 1970; 27 March 1973 – 25 April 1974
- Abd al-Halim Mahmud – 17 January 1972 – 26 March 1973
- Mohamed El-Sayed Hussein El-Dhahabi – 16 April 1975 – 19 March 1976
- Muhammad Metwalli al-Sha'rawi – 9 November 1976 – 26 October 1977
- Mohamed Abdel Rahman Bissar – 5 October 1978 – 29 January 1979
- Abdel Moneim El-Nemr – 29 January 1979 – 19 June 1979
- Zakaria El-Berry – 14 May 1980 – 6 October 1981
- Gad al-Haq – 3 January 1982 – 27 March 1982
- Ibrahim El-Desouki El-Maraghi – 27 March 1982 – 31 August 1982
- Mohamed El-Ahmadi Abu El-Nour – 5 June 1984 – 4 September 1985 (acting until 16 July 1984, then substantive)
- Mohamed Ali Mahgoub – 11 November 1986 – 13 October 1987
- Mahmoud Zakzouk – 4 January 1996 – 28 January 2011
- Abdullah El-Husseiny Helal – 31 January 2011 – 3 March 2011
- Abdel Fadil El-Qousi – 21 July 2011 – 21 November 2011
- Talaat Afifi – 2 August 2012 – 8 July 2013
- Muhammad Mukhtar Gomaa – 16 July 2013 – 3 June 2024
- Osama al-Azhari – 3 June 2024 – present

== See also ==
- Cabinet of Egypt
- Religion in Egypt
- Comité de Conservation des Monuments de l'Art Arabe
