= Egypt Vision 2030 =

National agenda launched in Egypt

Egypt Vision 2030 (SDS)
- رؤية مصــر 2030
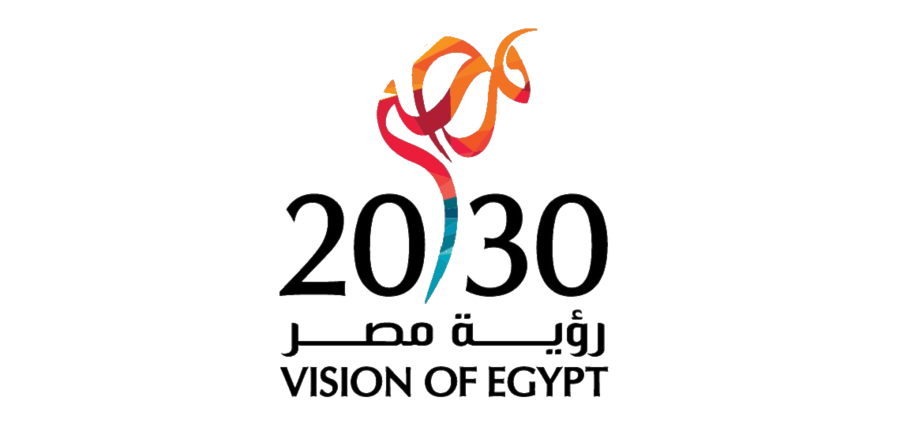
- Mission statement: "A long-term strategic plan to achieve the principles and goals of sustainable development in all fields."
- Slogan: As Egypt accelerates towards the future
- Type of project: National Development Agenda
- Founder: Government of Egypt
- Country: Egypt
- Prime Minister(s): Mostafa Madbouly
- Ministry: Ministry of Planning, Economic Development & International Cooperation
- Key people: Abdel Fattah el-Sisi, Ahmed Salah Rifky
- Launched: February 2016
- Status: Undergoing
- Website: egypt2030.gov.eg

Egypt Vision 2030 (Arabic: رؤية مصــر 2030) is a national agenda launched in February 2016 by the Egyptian Government and unveiled by the country's president, Abdel Fattah el-Sisi. The vision encompasses eight main national goals to be met by 2030, aligned with the United Nations' Sustainable Development Goals (SDGs) and the Sustainable Development Strategy for Africa 2063.

Taking into account Egypt's changing internal and regional circumstances, Egypt Vision 2030 was updated to address these new challenges in cooperation with the various ministries and the private sector, as well as the assistance of civil society organizations and various experts and specialists in multiple fields.

Several axes in the newly updated version in the three dimensions of the strategy, whether at the economic, social, or environmental levels, have already been identified, and include interest in the knowledge economy and encouraging innovation, industrial deepening, and value chains. As well as managing population growth issues, achieving spatial justice, in addition to paying attention to some development issues as intersectional goals and axes of the vision, such as issues of promoting women and youth empowerment, developing the small and medium enterprises sector, and encouraging entrepreneurship.

== Overview ==
Egypt has also secured $9.8 billion to expand the United Nations' Sustainable Development Goals (SDG), which have been an integral part of Egypt Vision 2030, in response to the worldwide COVID-19 crisis.

On 2 January 2021, Dr. Mohamed Nofal, an Egyptian information and communication technology expert, announced that Egypt is moving in the right direction towards digital transformation in all fields, indicating that within the framework of Egypt's 2030 vision for digital transformation of individuals and governments, the Egyptian state sought to launch Egypt's digital services, which were launched nationwide.

In 2020, Egypt was the only country in the Middle East and North Africa (MENA) region with a positive GDP growth rate, effectively becoming the only regional country to avoid the effects of the COVID-19 recession. On the other hand, all remaining countries in the region were projected to experience negative growth in 2020, with a rebound to 2.2 percent growth in 2021.

== Objectives ==
The strategic vision focuses on eight main objectives that are meant to be met by 2030.

=== Quality of life ===
Egypt's poverty rates have reached an all-time high, and recently have declined for the first time in 20 years since 1999 from 32.5% to 29.7%. The country aims to eliminate poverty by 2030.

=== Social equality ===
The Egyptian constitution placed the social aspect of equality and inclusion as a cornerstone of the National Agenda for sustainable development, as it stipulates, “We write a constitution that achieves equality between us in rights and duties without any discrimination,” and its fourth article states, "Sovereignty is for the people alone, that they exercise and protect it, and they are the source of authority, and they safeguard their national unity, which is based on the principles of equality, justice and equal opportunities for all citizens."

Therefore, the National Agenda seeks to achieve social justice and social integration, and to promote active citizenship and positive participation for all segments of society. The issues of empowerment, equality, and social justice are among the core issues Egypt Vision 2030 focuses on.

=== Economics ===
Egypt's current fiscal policy seeks to reduce the state budget deficit and public debt. The transformation towards a knowledge-based digital economy, encouraging innovation, research and development, enhancing the role of promising economic sectors, in addition to encouraging medium, small and micro enterprises, which are among the most important factors that lead to raising the degree of economic flexibility, increasing employment opportunities, achieving financial inclusion, and integrating the informal economic sector, leading to sustainable inclusive growth.

=== Education ===
As the country aims to establish a close relationship between localizing and employing technology and benefiting from it for sustainable inclusive growth and linking it to social aspects by investing in human capital and building scientific and practical capabilities in accordance with the latest educational systems, technical qualification and vocational training, leading to improving the level of educational and training services provided, all in order to increase productivity and positively affect the labor market.

=== Environmental politics ===
Egypt seeks to preserve both development and the environment together through the rational use of resources in a way that preserves the rights of future generations in a more secure and adequate way. The country aims to achieve this by facing the effects of climate change, enhancing the resilience of ecosystems and the ability to address natural hazards and disasters, increasing reliance on renewable energy, and adopting sustainable consumption and production patterns.

=== Governance ===
When it comes to governance of the state, Egypt's vision for the future is to establish governance and adherence to laws, rules, and procedures under the rule of law and an institutional framework necessary to achieve transparency, accountability, and fight corruption.

=== National security ===
The state places security as a top priority in its comprehensive sense at the national and regional levels as an imperative to achieve and maintain sustainable development. This objective includes ensuring the security of food, water, and sustainable energy, alongside preserving political, economic, social, and environmental stability, information security (cyber), maintaining effective monitoring of Egypt's borders, combating terrorism, and organized crime.

A once-stagnating and aging army, Egyptian Armed Forces have been undergoing heavy modernization and development in order to face looming regional threats and protect its interests. It also pursued a policy of diversification of weapon sources in order not to be over-reliant on foreign military aid and consequently, external pressure.

As of 2020, Egypt's military ranks among the top 10 strongest worldwide, ranking first in both Africa and the Middle East and had recently been playing a much larger role as a regional power than it has in the past decades.

=== Leading stature ===
Egypt aims to further increase its regional and international presence diplomatically by establishing mutually beneficial country partnerships with various surrounding countries. Egypt also aims to share its economic and technical experience with its neighboring countries in order to assist its peers with the necessary instruments for development, as well as provide foreign aid if needed. A goal in line with the Sustainable Development Strategy for Africa 2063.

== Projects ==
Since the announcement of the Egypt Vision 2030 strategy, the country has taken multiple steps since 2016 by funding new mega-projects countrywide, all having different goals, though a part of the 2030 vision.

=== Hayah Karima ===
The comprehensive megaproject of the social dimension of Egypt Vision 2030. Hayah Karima (pronounced [ħæˈjæː kæˈriːmæ], Arabic for "dignified life") targets Egypt's most impoverished and vulnerable segments of society in the countryside and remote villages mainly. Hayah Karima aims to provide decent housing, quality medical and educational services, and the necessary and basic infrastructure for the most impoverished and deprived rural villages and remote areas in Egypt that are needed for a decent life.

Hala Al-Said, Minister of Planning and Economic Development, stated that the project covers all the UN Sustainable Development Goals (SDG) in its various dimensions. Hayah Karima was listed in the UN's SDG's Good Practices report.

Overall, with its 3 phases, the megaproject aims to significantly improve the quality of life and livelihood of 60 million Egyptians living in the countryside.

It is reported that the megaproject mitigated the damages of COVID-19 considerably of the targeted groups.

=== The New Capital ===
The New Capital, Egypt's new capital city, is the largest project in modern-day Egypt, which includes many of Egypt's planned and current mega projects under construction. These mega projects include the Iconic Tower, The Octagon, Oblisco Capitale, Green River Park, Al-Fattah al-Aleem Mosque, Cathedral of the Nativity of Christ, Cairo and the Central Business District (CBD), Olympic City, and Capital International Airport.

This new capital city will allow the government to remove the ministries from outside of the very dense city Cairo. Now all the machinery of government would be outside the city, and it would reduce the vulnerability of the regime to popular protest. This comes from a lesson learned by regimes after 2011: proximity enables pressure. This city is not simply an urban development but more a political strategy to protect the unpopular Sisi government from a possible pro-democracy revolution.

=== Local Military Production ===
Egypt's Ministry of Military Production has developed an integrated plan to develop the country's domestic military manufacturing system, valued at approximately £E 7.3bln (US$465,000,000). The overall plan aims to meet the needs of the Egyptian Armed Forces from 2020 to 2030, and to direct the surplus for export in the period from 2025 to 2030.

The current allocated budget for the plan will be distributed among several sectors like ammunition, weapons, and equipment manufacturing.

== See also ==
- Economy of Egypt
- Golden Indonesia 2045 Vision
