= Egypt's Islamic Cultural Center =

Mosque and architectural landmark in Cairo, Egypt

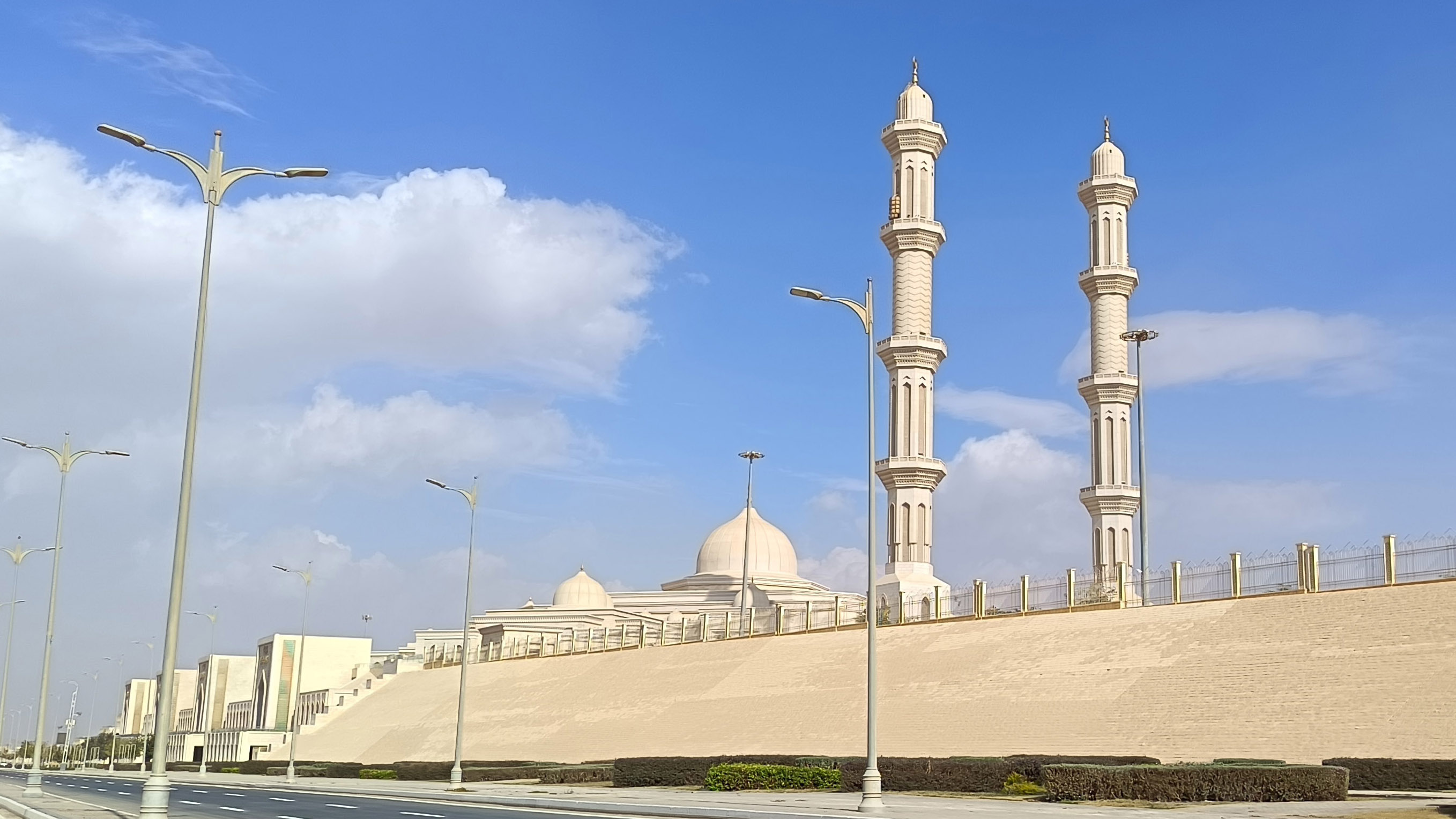

Religion
- Affiliation: Islam
- Ecclesiastical or organisational status: Mosque; Library; Museum; Conference center
- Status: Active

Location
- Location: New Administrative Capital, Cairo
- Country: Egypt
- Interactive map of Egypt's Islamic Cultural Center
- Coordinates: 30°00′06″N 31°45′17″E

Architecture
- Type: Mosque
- Style: Modern Islamic Egyptian; Neo-Mamluk
- Completed: 2022
- Construction cost: E£800 million

Specifications
- Capacity: 137,000 worshippers
- Interior area: 19,000 m^{2} (200,000 sq ft)
- Dome: 1 (world's heaviest dome)
- Dome height (inner): 57 m (187 ft)
- Dome dia. (outer): 29.5 m (97 ft)
- Minaret: 2
- Minaret height: 140 m (460 ft)
- Site area: 467,000 m^{2} (5,030,000 sq ft)

Egypt's Islamic Cultural Center, including the Masjid Misr also known as the Grand Mosque, is a mosque, religious center, and architectural landmark located in the New Administrative Capital in Cairo Governorate, Egypt. The center covers an area of 467,000 square metres (5,030,000 sq ft), and can accommodate 137,000 worshippers.

At its completion, the cultural center received three international certificates from the Guinness World Records. They included the world's largest pulpit handcrafted from wood and standing at 16.6 metres (54 ft) high, and the chandelier won two titles as the world's largest with a diameter of 22 metres (72 ft), and the heaviest at a weight of 50 short tons (45 t).

== History ==
In 2015, the concept for Egypt's purpose-built New Administrative Capital was introduced. In 2019, the first major religious buildings serving the new city, the Al-Fattah al-Aleem Mosque and a Coptic Orthodox cathedral, were completed. Early in 2021, plans to build Masjid Misr, a larger mosque, were announced, and this project was finished in 2022. In March 2023, Egypt's president Abdel Fattah el-Sisi officially opened the Islamic Cultural Centre.

== Architecture ==
Situated near the Presidential Axis, Route 11, and People's Square to the north, the center is located in the Governmental District. It is situated on a plateau that is 24 metres (79 ft) high and has the Mohamed Bin Zayed Northern Road as its southern boundary. The Grand Mosque, a library, an Islamic museum, a conference center, ceremonial halls, classrooms, retail stores, and a seven-storey parking structure with room for 3,000 cars are all part of the complex.

Egypt's Grand Mosque draws influence from the scenery of the Nile Delta to combine modern design features with traditional Islamic architectural aspects. The outside design of the mosque is modeled after a lotus blossom in bloom, signifying purity and the advancement of spirituality. Inside are calligraphy, intricate geometric designs, and other elements of Islamic creative culture.

The mosque is flanked by two minarets that rise 140 metres (460 ft) above the top courtyard, and it contains six halls, including the central prayer hall. The steel center dome measures 29.5 metres (97 ft) in diameter. This mosque broke three records: it features the largest chandelier in the world, measuring 22 metres (72 ft) in diameter, the heaviest chandelier, weighing 24,300 kilograms (53,600 lb), and the tallest pulpit in the world, standing at 16.6 metres (54 ft). With 12,000 seats in the main prayer hall, 40,000 in the upper hall, and 55,000 in the basement hall, the 19,000-square-metre (200,000 sq ft) mosque can hold 107,000 worshipers.

The mosque has two levels, with three main entrances and a fourth for services. The first level is 20 metres (66 ft) high, while the second level reaches the pinnacle of the dome at 57 metres (187 ft). There are separate domes for the east and west halls as well. The mosque's secondary and upper courtyards are connected by service buildings and a commercial culture center. The mosque is surrounded by 30,000 square metres (320,000 sq ft) of white marble. There are two arcades located on its east and on its west. The mosque was completed at a cost of E£800 million (US$25.9 million; £20.7 million).

== Museum of Quran Reciters ==
The Museum of Qur'an Reciters is located within the Dar al-Qur'an at Egypt's Islamic Cultural Center. It was inaugurated on 15 December 2025 by Minister of Culture Ahmed Fouad Hanno and Minister of Endowments Osama al-Azhari.

The museum comprises four exhibition halls displaying manuscripts, historical documents, personal belongings and recitation certificates associated with prominent Egyptian Qur'an reciters. its collection includes materials relating to Muhammad Rifat, Mustafa Ismail, Mahmoud Khalil Al-Hussary, Muhammad Siddiq Al-Minshawi, Taha el-Fashni and Abdul Basit 'Abd us-Samad, among others. The museum also features dedicated listening rooms for recorded Qur'anic recitations.

== See also ==
- Islam in Egypt
- Islamic architecture
- List of largest mosques
- List of mosques in Cairo
