= Vision 2030 =

Vision 2030 may refer to:

- Abu Dhabi Vision 2030, a set of strategic policies for the development of the Emirate
- Egypt Vision 2030, a strategic national agenda to achieve sustainable development
- Kenya Vision 2030, a medium-term development programme
- Qatar National Vision 2030, a plan to enable sustainable development
- Saudi Vision 2030, a plan to reduce the country's dependence on oil
