= EDSA Revolution of 2001 =

EDSA Revolution of 2001 refers to either of two consecutive events relating to a change of power in the Philippines over the course of the first four months of 2001.

These are:

- EDSA II in January 2001 that toppled President Joseph Estrada after an aborted impeachment trial
- EDSA III in April 2001 that climaxed in a failed siege of the presidential palace by Estrada's supporters

== See also ==
- EDSA (disambiguation)
- EDSA Revolution (disambiguation)
