= Dina Ayman =

Software engineer

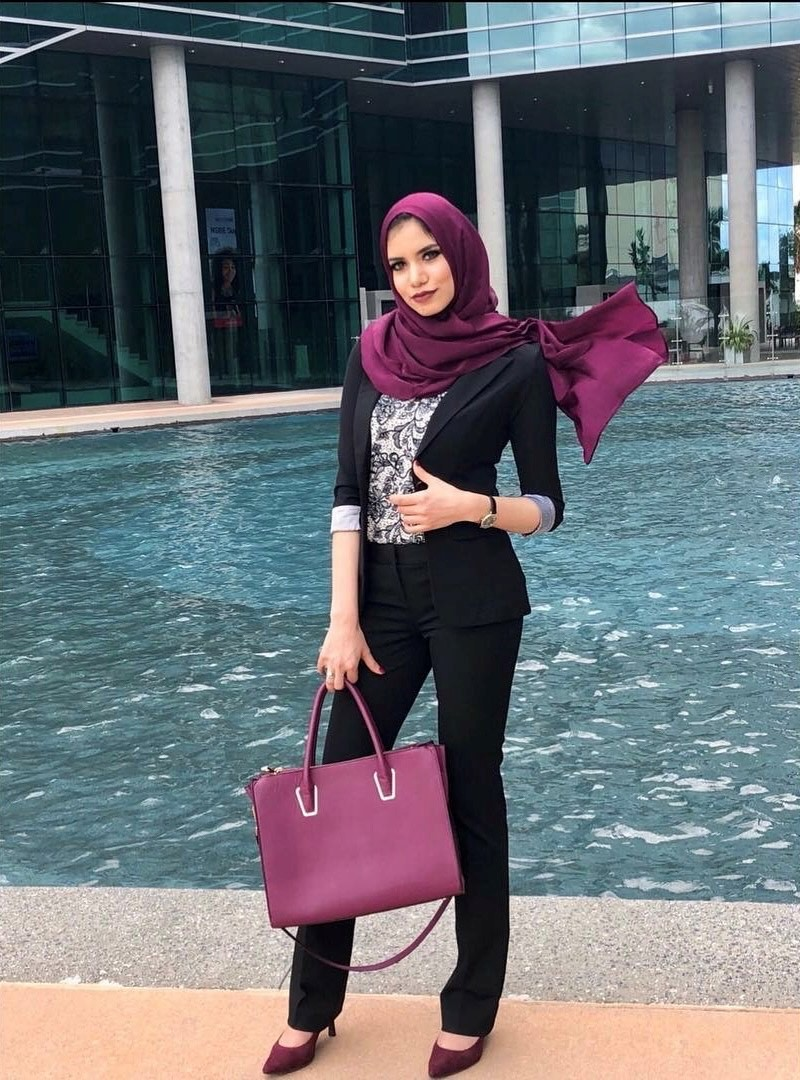
- Born: January 9, 1994 (age 32); New Jersey, U.S.
- Education: New Jersey Institute of Technology
- Occupation: Computer engineer

Dina Ayman (born January 9, 1994) is an American computer engineer and advocate for diversity and inclusion in engineering.

== Early life and education ==
Ayman was born in New Jersey. Her family moved backed to Egypt before returning to New Jersey when Aymen was a teenager. Ayman studied engineering at New Jersey Institute of Technology, obtained both a bachelor's degree and a master's degree in 2018.

== Career ==
She worked as a software engineer at Intel before obtaining a job at Microsoft. In 2022, she was working as a software engineering program manager at the tech company. Ayman is also an adjunct professor of engineering at New Jersey Institute of Technology.

In 2022 she competed in Miss Universe, was named to Forbes' 30 under 30 list, and received a presidential award from the President of Egypt for her work encouraging more women in STEM professions.

She is a brand ambassador for the Haya Karima project to reduce poverty and provide jobs in villages in Egypt.
