= Capital Airport (disambiguation) =

Capital Airport primarily refers to Beijing Capital International Airport, serving Beijing, China.

Capital Airport may also refer to:

- Abraham Lincoln Capital Airport, serving Springfield, Illinois, United States
- Capital Region International Airport, serving Lansing, DeWitt Township, Michigan, United States
- Cherry Capital Airport, serving Traverse City, Grand Traverse County, Michigan, United States
- Capital International Airport (Egypt), built to serve Egypt's New Administrative Capital

== See also ==
- Capital City Airport (disambiguation)
