= Sphinx International Airport =

Airport in Egypt

Sphinx International Airport مطار سفنكس الدولي
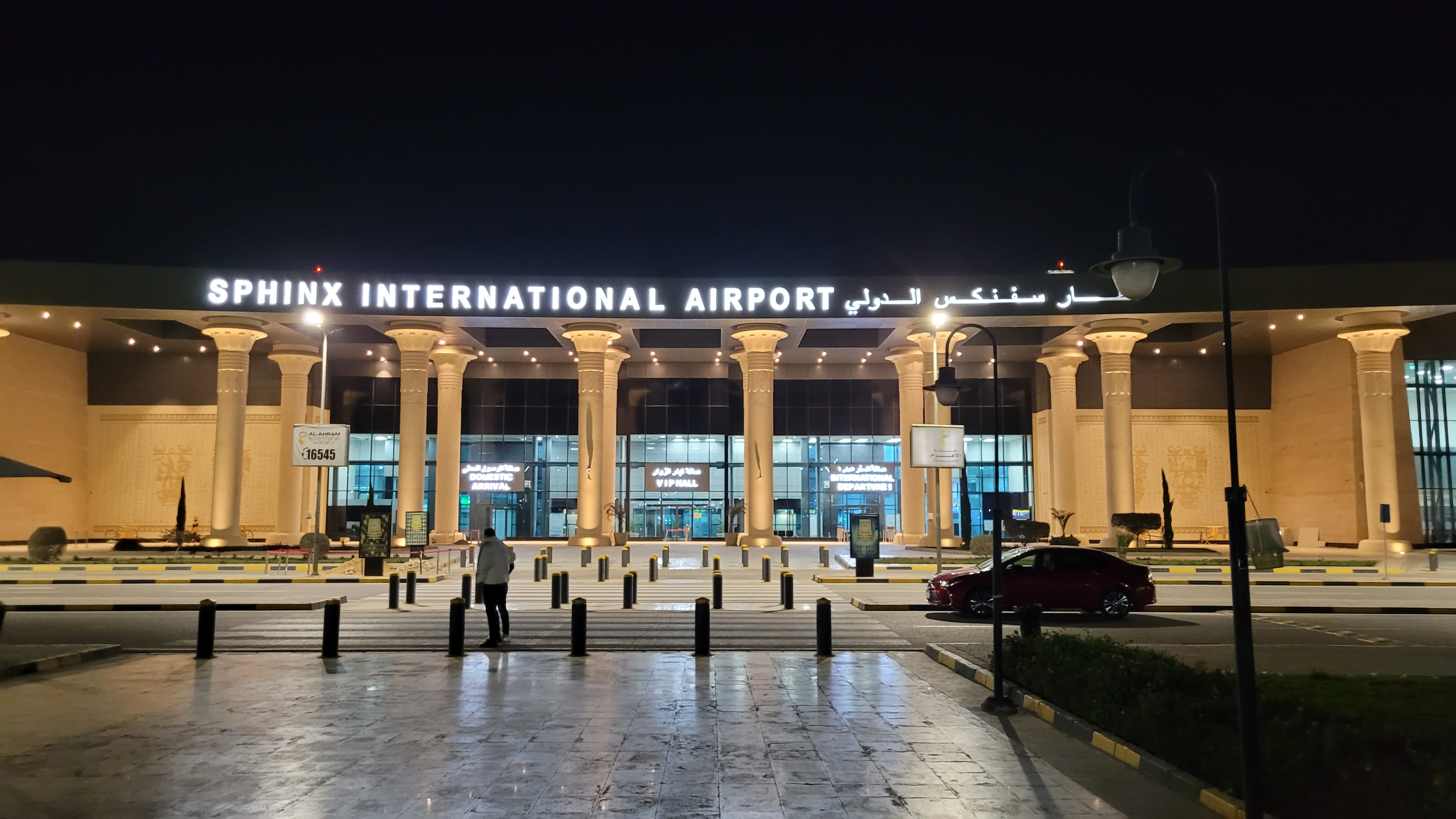
- IATA: SPX; ICAO: HESX

Summary
- Airport type: Public
- Serves: Giza, Greater Cairo, Egypt
- Elevation AMSL: 553 ft (169 m)
- Coordinates: 30°06′35″N 30°53′40″E
- Website: airportsphinx.com

Map
- Sphinx International Airport SPX (Middle East) SPX (Africa)

Runways
Direction	Length		Surface
Direction	m	ft	Surface
16R/34L	3,650	11,975	Asphalt
- Source: SkyVector

Sphinx International Airport (IATA: SPX, ICAO: HESX) is a public airport, serving the city of Giza, on the western side of Cairo, Egypt.

== History ==
In October 2017, it was announced that the airport would be open to commercial flights in summer 2018 and would start experimental operations in October 2018.

In January 2019, EgyptAir Express launched test flights to Hurghada, Sharm El Sheikh, Luxor and Aswan.

On 1 January 2020, the airport received its first international flight from Jordan, operated by Fly Jordan. On 2 November 2022, scheduled flights from Sharm El Sheikh to Sphinx airport started. The airport is operational but still undergoing final fit.

== Facilities ==
The airport is adjacent to and shares some infrastructure with the Cairo West Air Base. It is located on the Cairo-Alexandria desert road. The main runway (16R/34L) is 2 kilometres (1.2 mi) west of the Cairo West runway complex. The aircraft parking ramp and terminal facilities are on the west side of the runway. The Cairo West TACAN (Ident: BLA) is located on the field. The Cairo VOR-DME (Ident: CVO) is located 25.6 nautical miles (47 km) east of the airport.

In December 2020, it was reported the airport was being expanded to increase the total area from 4,500 to 23,000 square meters (48,000 to 248,000 square feet), helping to provide a capacity of 900 passengers per hour instead of 300. This is to accommodate an increase in passenger traffic expected as a result of the opening of the Grand Egyptian Museum. The airport building is expected to include a travel hall with an area of 6,500 square meters (70,000 square feet), an arrival hall of 7,000 square meters, a food and beverage area of 1,000 square meters, duty-free shops, passport offices, an X-ray area and 28 check-in counters. This is in addition to a banking and quarantine area, a baggage claim area, eight passport counters, eight escalators, and a cooling plant with a capacity of 1,440 tons of refrigeration (5 megawatts).

== Airlines and destinations ==
The following airlines operate regular scheduled and charter flights at Giza Sphinx Airport:

Airlines	Destinations
Air Arabia	Sharjah; Seasonal: Abu Dhabi
easyJet	Milan–Malpensa, Paris–Charles de Gaulle; Seasonal: Berlin, Geneva, London–Luton, Manchester, Naples (begins 2 December 2026), Nice
Edelweiss Air	Seasonal: Zurich
Flydubai	Dubai–International
Flynas	Abha, Medina, Riyadh
Kuwait Airways	Kuwait City
Pegasus Airlines	Istanbul–Sabiha Gökçen; Seasonal: Antalya
SalamAir	Muscat
Wizz Air	London–Luton, Rome–Fiumicino; Seasonal: Budapest, Milan–Malpensa

== See also ==
- List of airports in Egypt
- Transport in Egypt
- Cairo International Airport
- Capital International Airport
- New Administrative Capital of Egypt
