= Capital City Airport =

Capital City Airport may refer to:

- Capital City Airport (Pennsylvania), in Harrisburg, Pennsylvania, United States (FAA: CXY)
- Capital City Airport (Kentucky), in Frankfort, Kentucky, United States (FAA: FFT)
- Capital Region International Airport, formerly Capital City Airport, in Lansing, Michigan, United States (FAA: LAN)

== See also ==
- Capital Airport (disambiguation)
