= EDSA (disambiguation) =

EDSA stands for "Epifanio de los Santos Avenue", a highway around Metro Manila, Philippines.

EDSA may also refer to:

== EDSA in the Philippines ==
- People Power Revolution, known as EDSA I, of 1986
- Second EDSA Revolution of January 2001
- EDSA III, or May 1 riots, May 2001
- EDSA Busway, a bus transit system
- EDSA Shrine, erected to commemorate the 1986 revolution; site of the 2001 revolutions
- EDSA station (PNR) of the Philippine National Railways
- EDSA station (LRT) of the Metro Manila LRT

== Other uses ==
- EDSA (company), an architecture and urban planning firm formerly known as Edward D. Stone Jr., and Associates
- Eastern District SA, a Hong Kong sports club

== See also ==
- EDSA Revolution (disambiguation)
