= EDSA Revolution (disambiguation) =

EDSA Revolution or the People Power Revolution is the 1986 event in the Philippines that toppled President Ferdinand Marcos Sr. after alleged cheating in the 1986 Philippine presidential election.

EDSA Revolution may also refer to:

- Second EDSA Revolution in January 2001 that toppled President Joseph Estrada after an aborted impeachment trial
- EDSA III in March to April 2001 that climaxed in a failed siege of the presidential palace by Estrada's supporters

== See also ==
- EDSA (disambiguation)
- EDSA Revolution of 2001, index of revolutions in that year
