= Green River Park =

Urban parks in Egypt

- النهر الأخضر
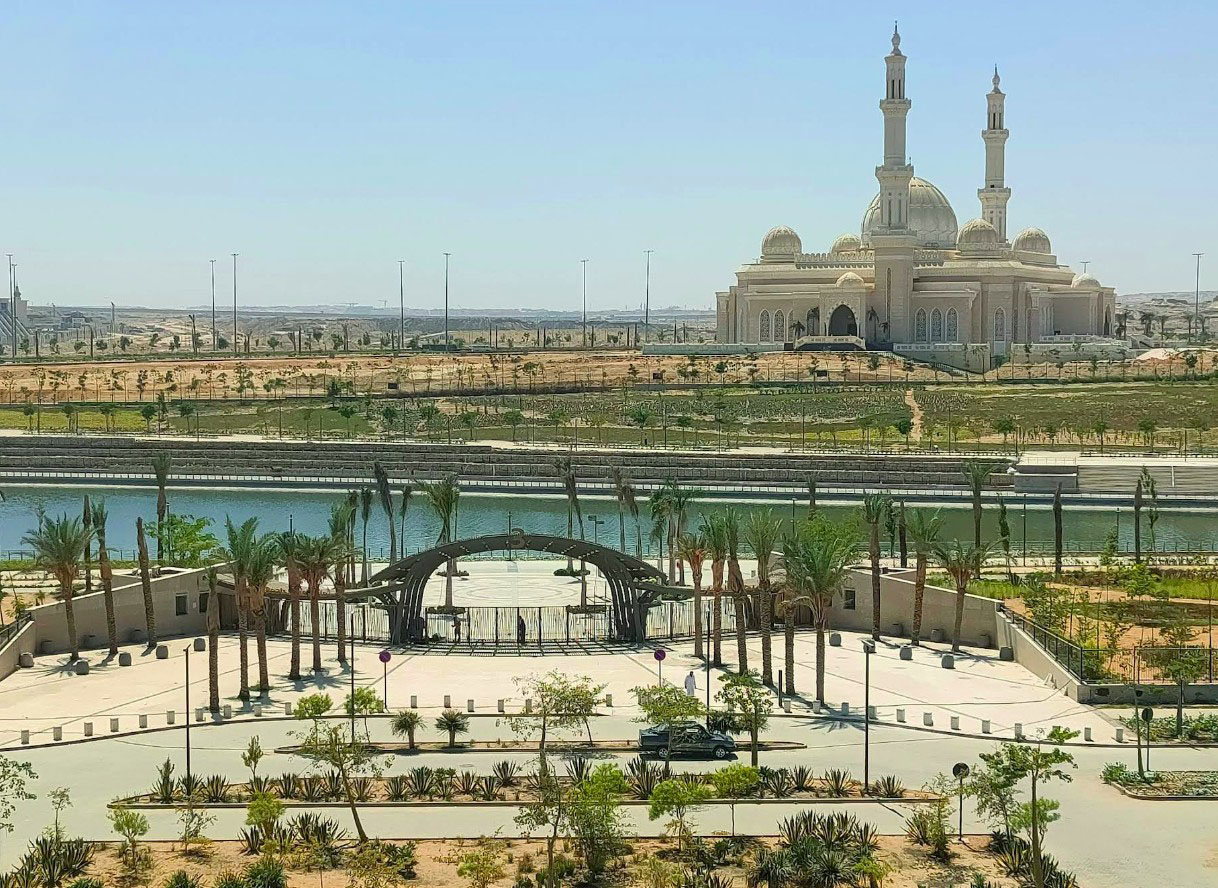
- Interactive map of Green River Park
- Type: Urban park
- Location: New Administrative Capital, Egypt
- Coordinates: 30°00′50″N 31°39′23″E
- Area: 2,509 hectares (6,200 acres)
- Created: 2019
- Established: 2024
- Operator: Dar Al-Handasah & Ministry of Housing
- Status: Under construction
- Budget: $600 million (phase one)
- Public transit: Monorail

Green River Park (Arabic: حديقة النهر الأخضر) also referred to as Capital Park (Arabic: كابيتال بارك) is a regional scale urban park located in the heart of the New Administrative Capital of Egypt. The first 10KM phase is partially completed and, combined with planned phase 2, will eventually span over 35 kilometres (22 mi), and cover a total area of 2,509 hectares (6,200 acres), making it six times the size of Central Park in New York City.

The Prime Minister of Egypt, Mostafa Madbouly, stated that all 20 neighbourhoods in the new capital will be linked to the Green River, which is meant to mimic the Nile River's passage through the middle of Cairo.

The Green River focuses on attracting investments as the park will generate 300,000 new employment opportunities, as well as boost Egypt's economic growth, as the park will be accepting a capacity of 370,000 visitors per day. It is planned to be the longest green hub in the world.

== Construction ==
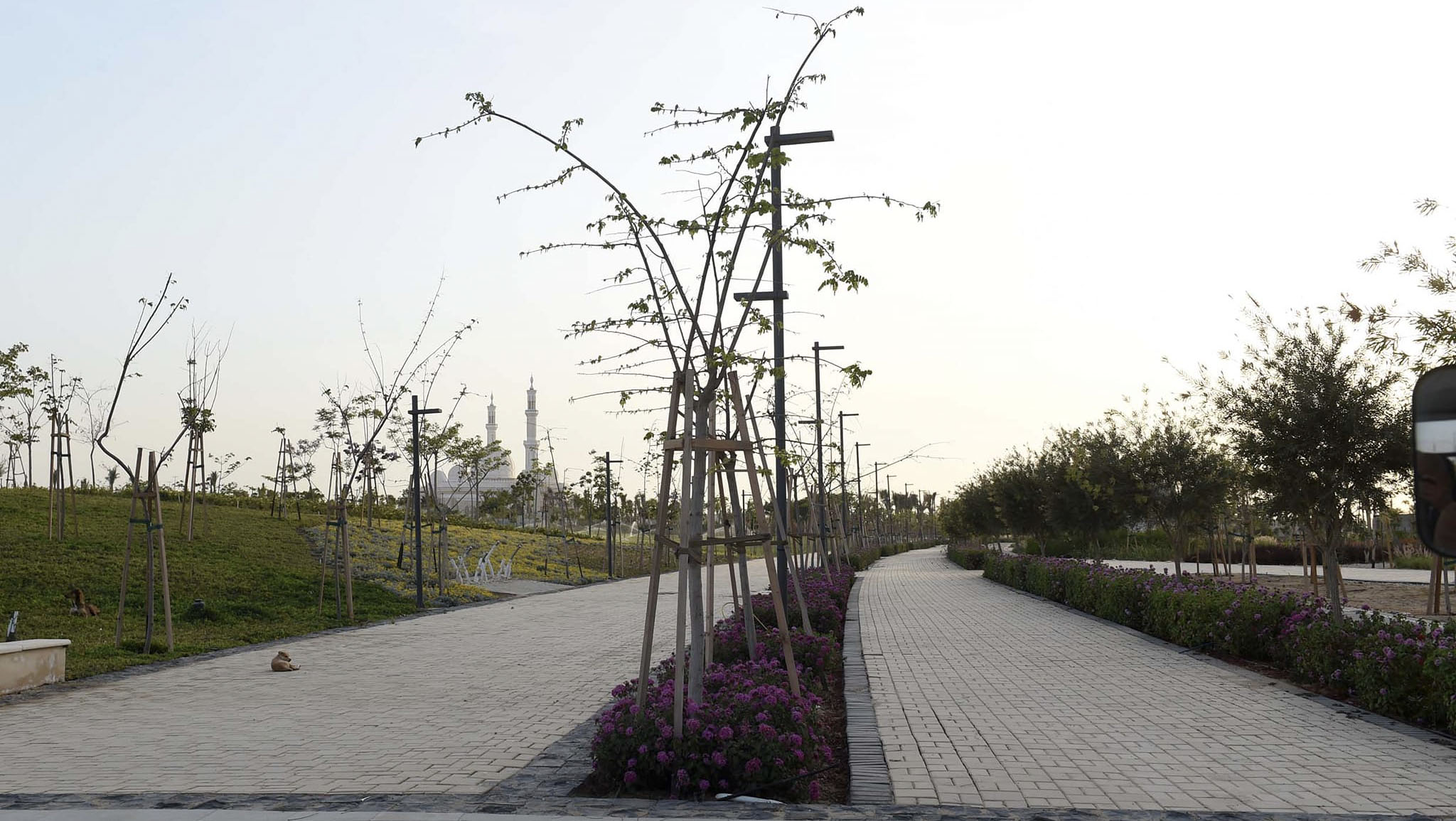
Green River Park

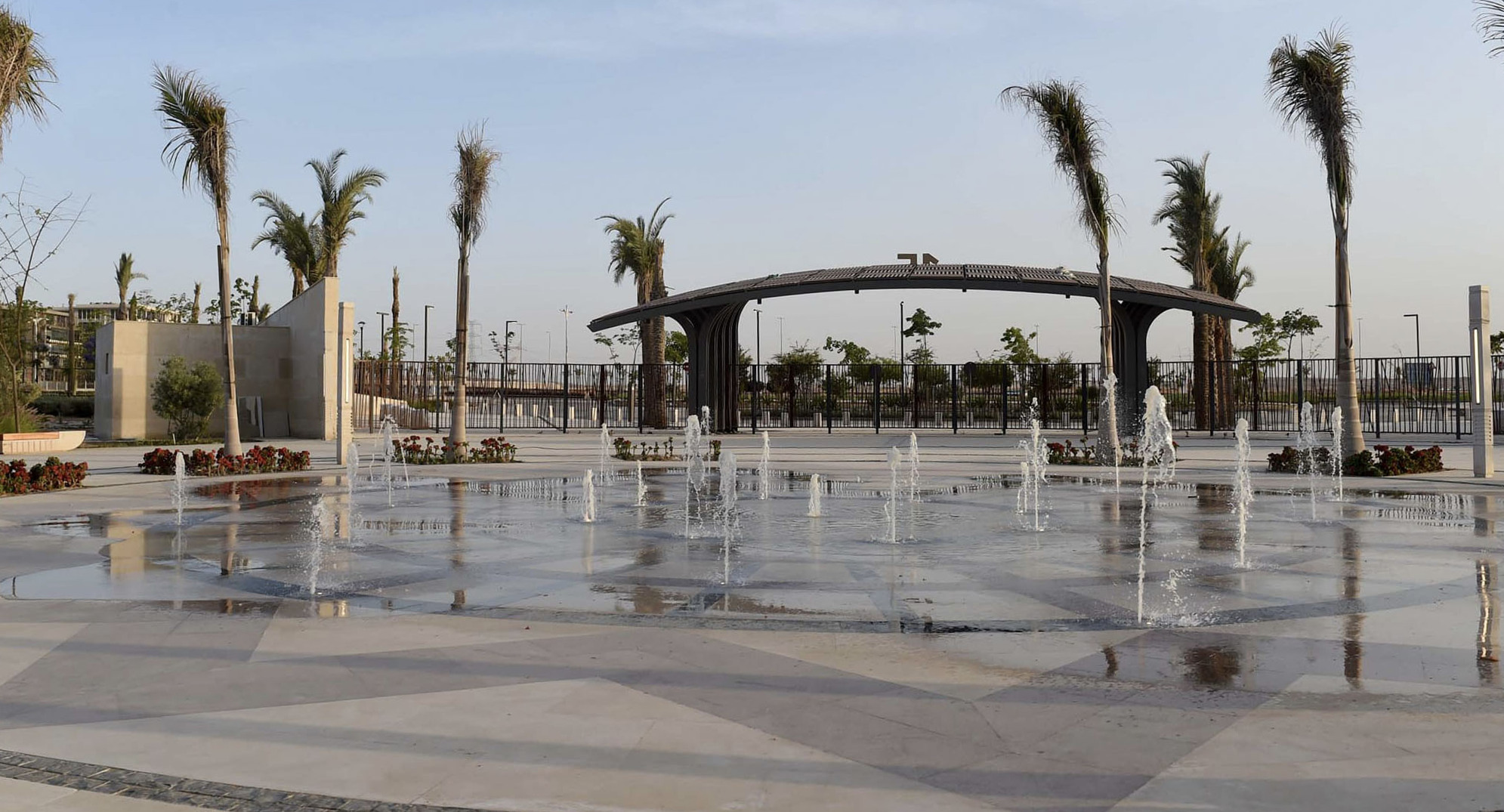
Green River Park

In 2018 the final Concept Landscape Masterplan by Dar Al Handasah Landscape Architects was approved by Administrative Capital for Urban Development and the Prime Minister Mostafa Madbouly following initial proposals in 2016, by !melk and EDSA The revised plans and designs were approved and later unveiled by the Urban Development Consortium and the government to the public.

In January 2019, Egyptian Prime Minister Mostafa Madbouly, said that Egypt officially launched the first phase of construction of the Green River project designed by Dar Al Handasah.

=== Phases of construction ===
The Green River's construction is divided into three phases; to complement and sync with the overall capital building plan, as the first phase is divided into three central/capital parks. Each phase in the park has its own distinct characteristics. The second and third phases' characteristics are yet to be disclosed to the public.

==== First phase ====
The first phase of the Green River (Capital Park) project is divided from east to west into three planning sectors, each of which contains a park with a different focus. All three parks are about 35 kilometres (22 mi) in total and 1,038 acres (420 ha), out of 6,200 acres (2,500 ha). It will extend from the central ring road in Cairo to the regional ring road passing through the Central Business Park with an estimated investment of £E 9 billion (US$ 600 million). The construction will be conducted by the Egyptian Ministry of Housing in partnership with Dar al Handasah. It is estimated that the first phase of the park would accept more than 2 million visitors annually, and its construction is expected to take approximately 18 months to be fully finished by June 30, 2021.

===== Capital Park 1 Islamic | Cultural =====
The initial phase (CP1 | History) is 4 kilometres (2.5 mi) long with a total area of 386 acres (156 ha). It is the sector that simulates the environment, and is in harmony with the factors of nature. CP1 includes more than 250 acres (100 ha) of open areas for picnicking and outdoor activity and will house a mosque, botanical gardens, a bedouin camp, and an iconic monument plaza.

===== Capital Park 2 - Downtown | Entertainment =====
The second phase (CP2 | Sustainability) is 3 kilometres (1.9 mi) long with a total area of 315 acres (127 ha). This sector is a considered the center for cultural and entertainment activities. CP2 includes more than 240 acres (97 ha) of open areas that will make it a major hub for community and recreational activities. It will also feature jogging trails, multi-sports fields, a wetlands park, a community garden and a group of distinct projects that reflect the characteristics of this part of the Green River.

===== Capital Park 3 CBD | Civic =====
The third phase (CP3 | Civic) is 4 kilometres (2.5 mi) long with a total area of 318 acres (129 ha). It is the sector that embodies the nature and privacy of public parks, and their close connection with the surroundings. It will include riverfront restaurants, retail shops, a sculpture garden, a ferris wheel, an open library with reading gardens, and a recreational sports club. CP3 includes about 250 acres (100 ha) of open areas for picnicking and is located right outside the Central Business District (CBD).

== Transportation ==
The Green River park's infrastructure and transportation systems are both done in a way where all amenities are accessible through a network of pedestrian links, cycle routes, and green bridges. The infrastructure also serves rapid transportation via the inter-city monorail, light rail links and the inner-city tram as well as an electric bus network.

== Features ==
- The Green River will be open for visits free of charge for the New Administrative Capital, New Cairo and Cairo residents.
- All universities and cities in the new capital are somehow connected to the Green River.
- All districts in the new capital contain green gardens through which residents can reach the main park on foot.
- An integrated network of pedestrian and bicycle paths will allow people of all abilities to enjoy the parks.

== Gardens ==
The Green River consists of 7 gardens.

1. International Park
2. Sports Park
3. Plants Garden
4. Historic Park
5. Science Park
6. Health and Population Park
7. Business and Finance Park
