= The New Capital =

New urban community in Cairo Governorate, Egypt

The New Capital العاصمة الجديدة
- City
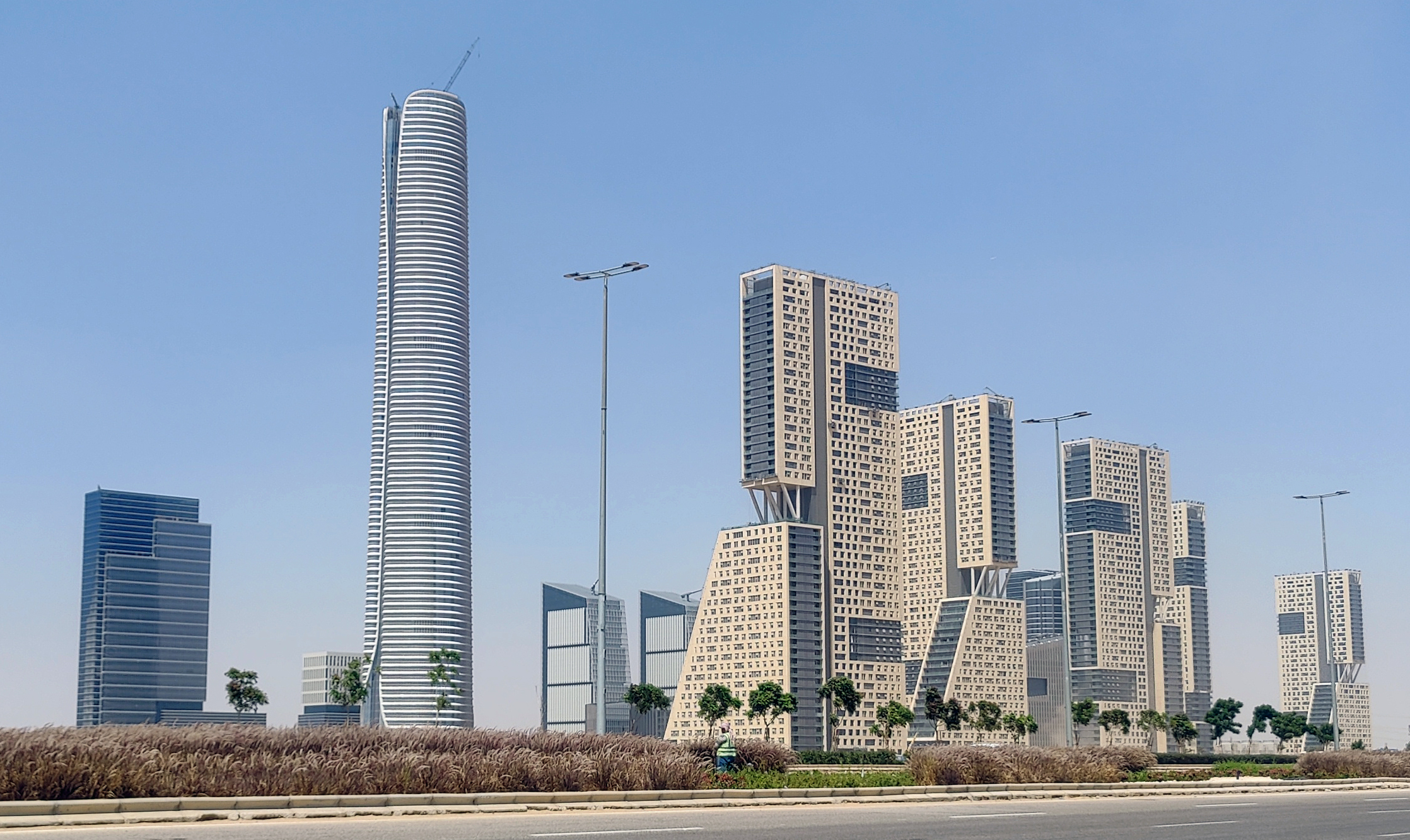
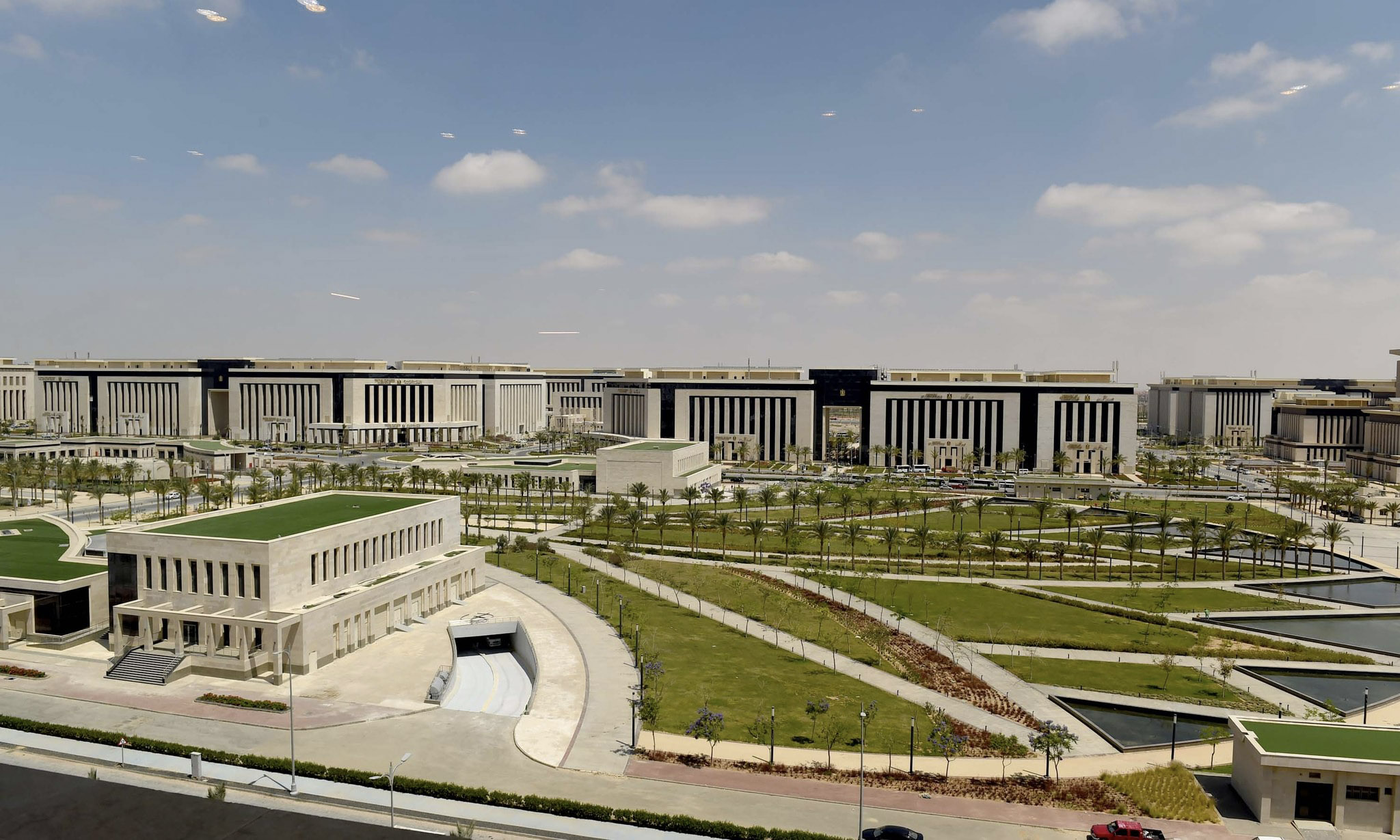
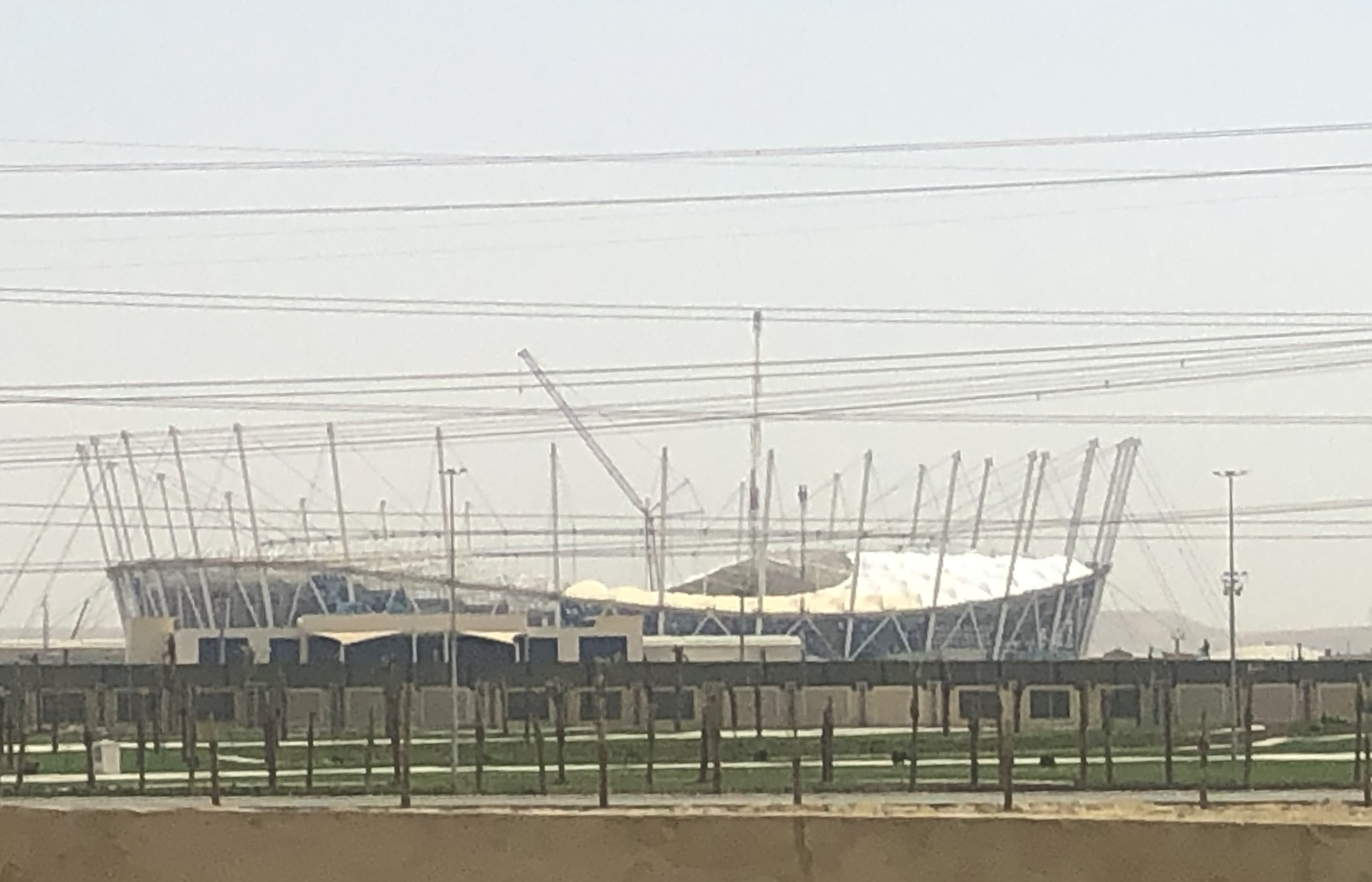
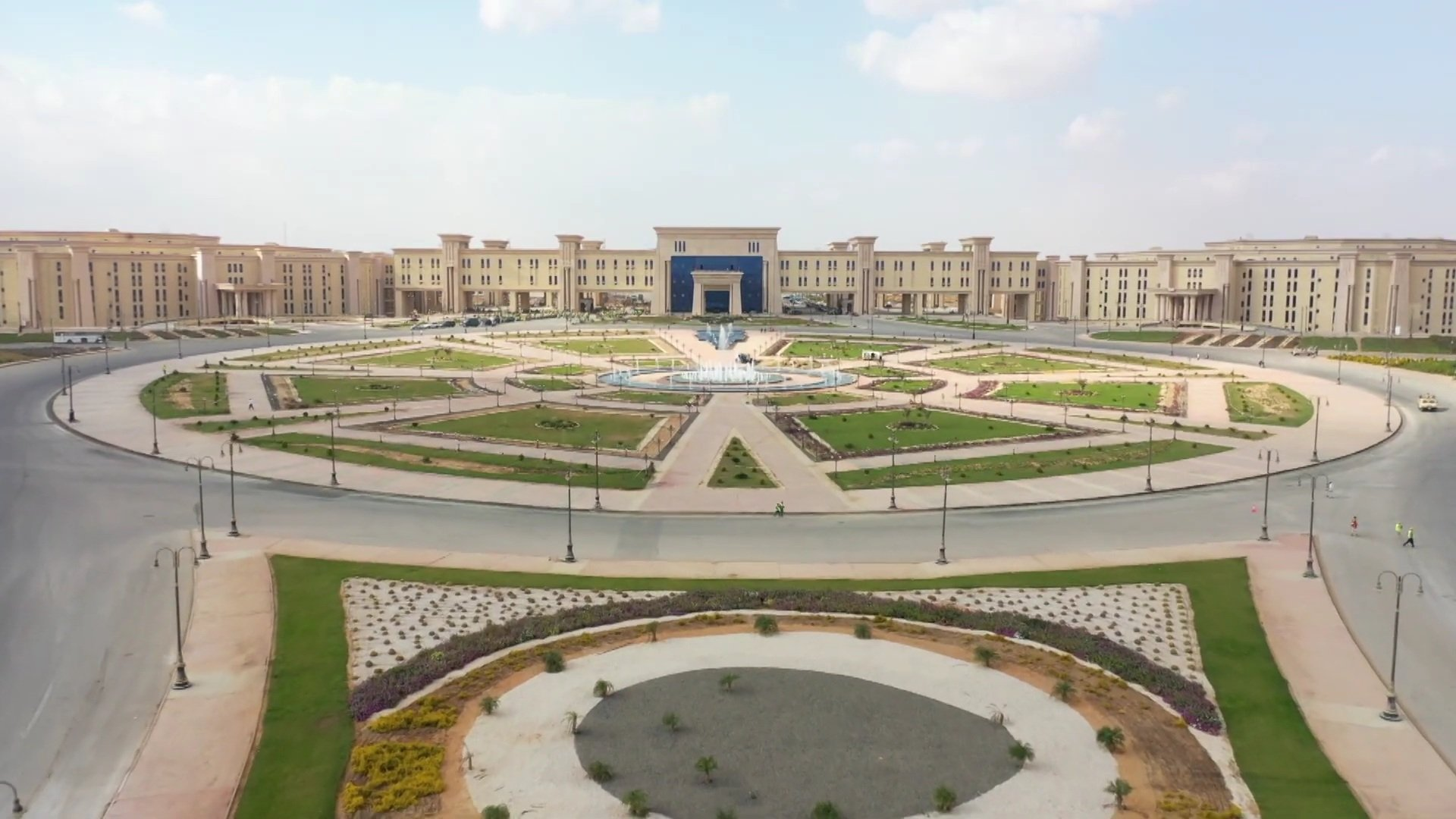
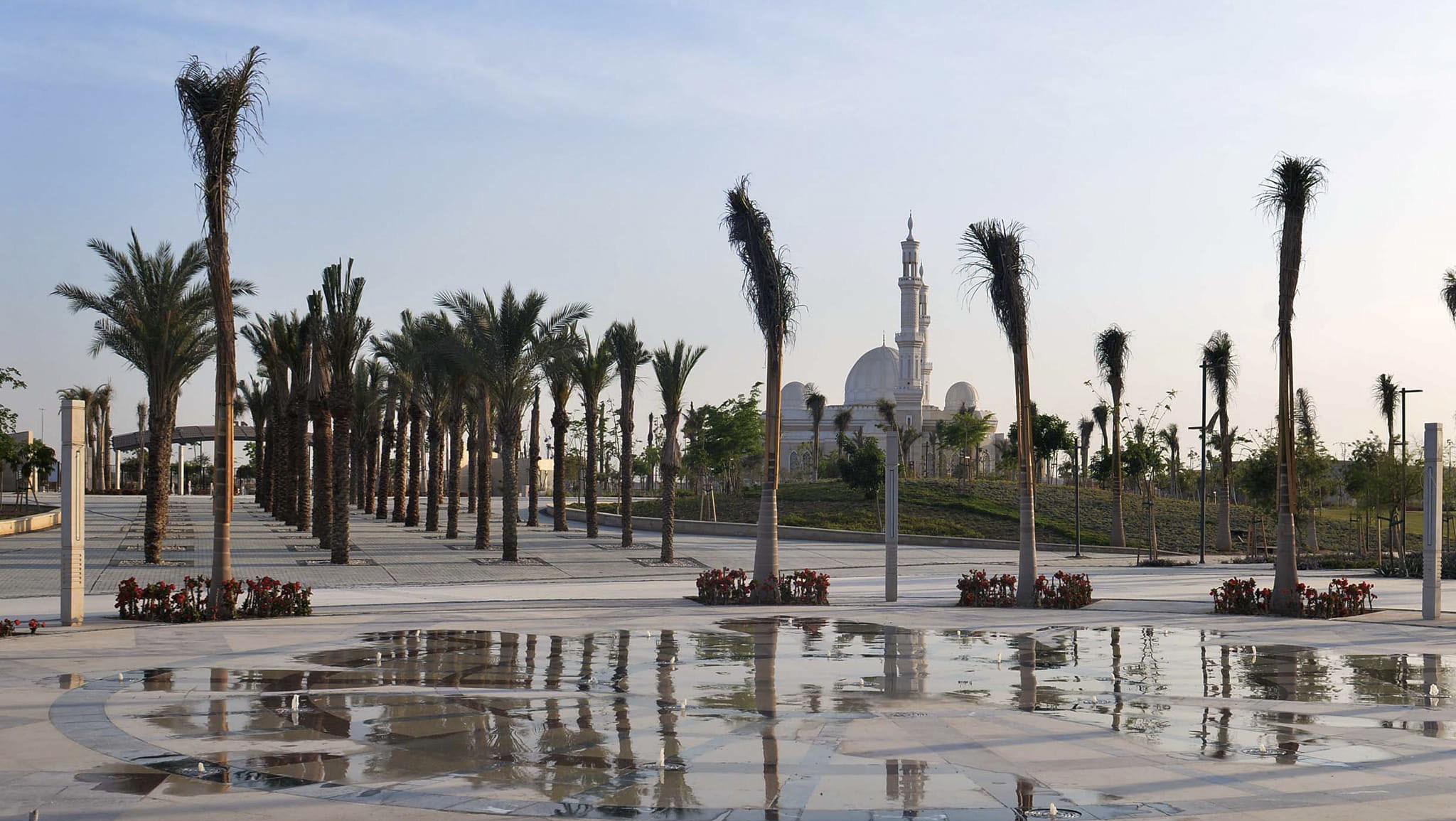
- Central Business District Government District Misr Stadium The Octagon Green River Park

- Location within Egypt
- Coordinates: 30°01′19″N 31°45′18″E
- Country: Egypt
- Governorate: Cairo

Area (as planned)
  - City centre: 5.6 km^{2} (2.2 sq mi)
  - Urban: 714 km^{2} (276 sq mi)
- Time zone: UTC+2 (EET)
  - Summer (DST): UTC+3 (EEST)
- Major airports: Capital International Airport
- Abbreviation: (TBD)
- Website: acud.eg

The New Capital (Egyptian Arabic: العاصمة الجديدة, romanized: el-ʿĀṣima el-Gedīda) is a new urban community and the de facto capital of Egypt east of New Cairo in Cairo Governorate. As of May 2023, 14 ministries and government entities have been relocated there. On 2 April 2024, president Abdel Fattah al-Sisi took the constitutional oath for a third consecutive term in office, officially inaugurating the new capital city as the seat of Egyptian government.

Plans for the new capital were announced by the then-Egyptian housing minister Mostafa Madbouly at the Egypt Economic Development Conference on 13 March 2015. The capital city is considered one of the projects for economic development, and is part of a larger initiative called Egypt Vision 2030.

Over the years, attempts were made to give the city a proper name other than the New Administrative Capital. A competition was launched on the new capital's website to choose a new name and logo for the city. A jury of specialists was formed to evaluate the proposals submitted to list and determine the best among them, but no official results were announced by the Egyptian Government. In October 2021, Minister of Transport Kamel al-Wazir indicated the city could be named "Wedian" (meaning "Riverbed" or "Valley"), or "Masr" (the Arabic name for "Egypt"). Other proposed names include "Kemet", "Al Mustaqbal" and "Al Salam". However, by the time it was officially inaugurated in 2024, it had remained as the New Administrative Capital. On 8 November 2025, the New Administrative Capital was officially renamed The New Capital. In February 2026, a draft law was submitted to designate The New Capital as a "province with a special status" and rename the city to "Memphis".

The new city is located 45 kilometres (28 miles) east of Cairo and just outside the Regional Ring Road, in a largely undeveloped area halfway to the seaport city of Suez. On a total area of 700 square kilometres (270 mi^{2}), it is expected to house a population of 6.5 million people, though it is estimated that the figure could rise to seven million. The government has stated that the undertaking of the project is to relieve congestion in Cairo, which has a metropolitan population of nearly 20 million.

== Plans ==
The city was planned to consist of a government administrative district, a diplomatic quarter, a cultural district (opera and theatres), a central business district (CBD), parks (the 'green river'), and 21 residential districts. The NAC is being built in stages, initially over the space of 170,000 feddans (714km^{2}/270 sq mi), which later grew to 223,383 feddans (907km^{2}). Phase 1 (2016 – ), covering over 40,000 feddans - or less than a quarter of the land allocated for the city, holds all government, parliamentary, judicial and presidential buildings, as well as the CBD and residential districts. Plans for Phase II were planned to start 2024, but the further 40,000 feddan expansion has been delayed to 2026.

Some amenities planned for the city are a central park, artificial lakes, around 2,000 educational institutions, technology and innovation park, 18 hospitals, 1,250 mosques and churches, a 93,440-seat stadium, 40,000 hotel rooms, a major theme park four times the size of Disneyland, 90 square kilometres of solar energy farms and electric railway link with Cairo.

It is being built as a smart city with over 6,000 cameras monitoring the streets. Along with this, authorities will be using AI to monitor water use and waste management, and residents will be able to submit complaints into a mobile app.

=== Moving state institutions ===
It was originally planned that parliament, presidential palaces, government ministries and foreign embassies would be moved into the city between 2020 and 2022, but due to construction delays and the COVID-19 pandemic, the move of over 30,000 government employees was delayed to March 2023. By 5 May 2023, 14 ministries and government entities had relocated to the New Administrative Capital. On 2 April 2024, the swearing in of president Abdel Fattah al-Sisi in front of Parliament for a third term in office officially inaugurated the city as the new seat of government.

It is expected to cost over US$100 million to move the government from Cairo to NAC but a full cost and timeline for the overall project has not yet been revealed.

Feedback on former experiences of capital relocation was looked at, for instance by meeting with representatives from Astana, which replaced Almaty as the capital city of Kazakhstan in 1997.

==== The Octagon ====
The Octagon (State's Strategic Leadership Centre) is Egypt's new Ministry of Defense headquarters. The complex is considered the largest of its kind in the Middle East and one of the largest in the world, much like the Pentagon in the United States of America.

== Finance and construction ==
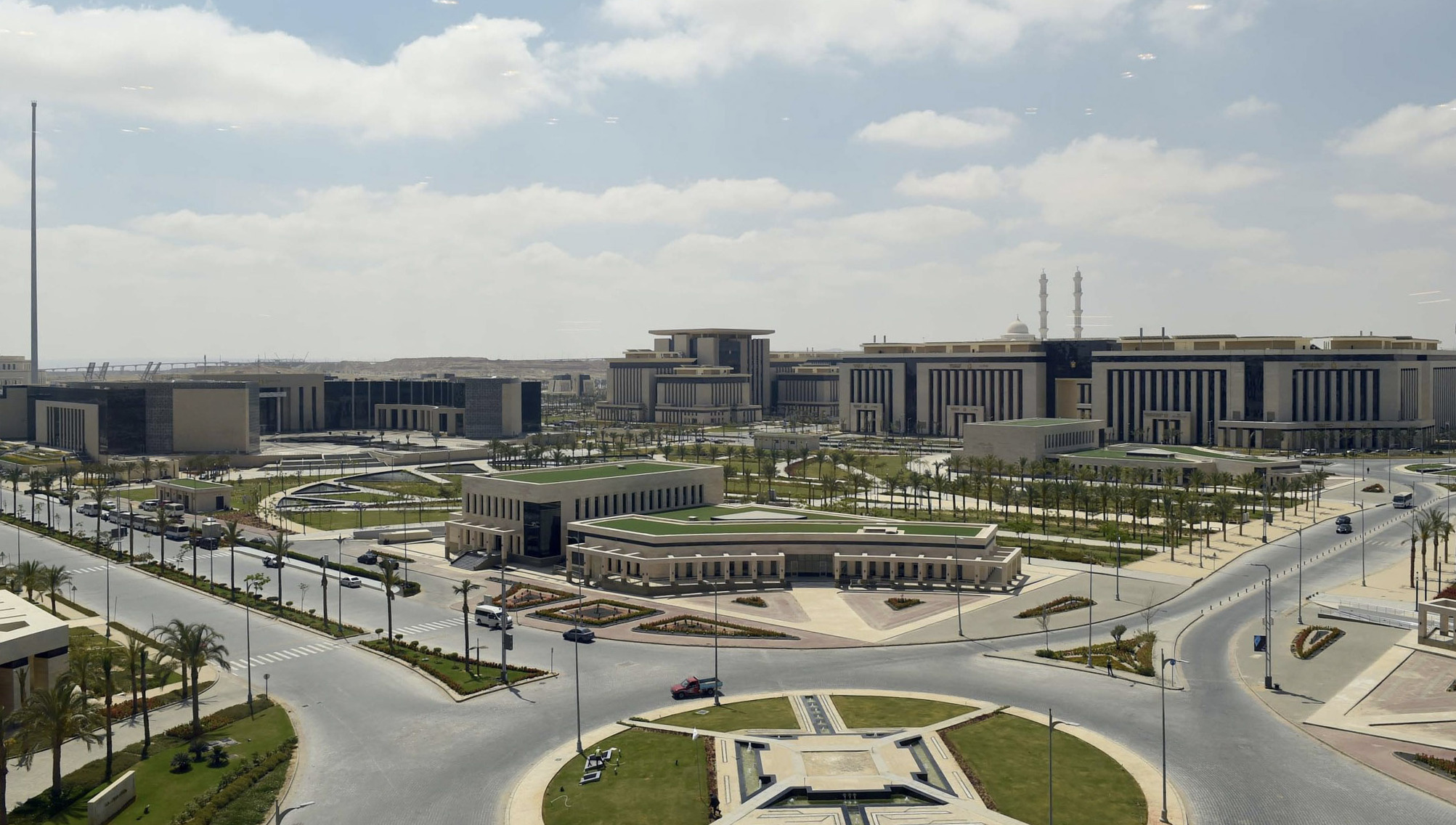
Center view of The Government District

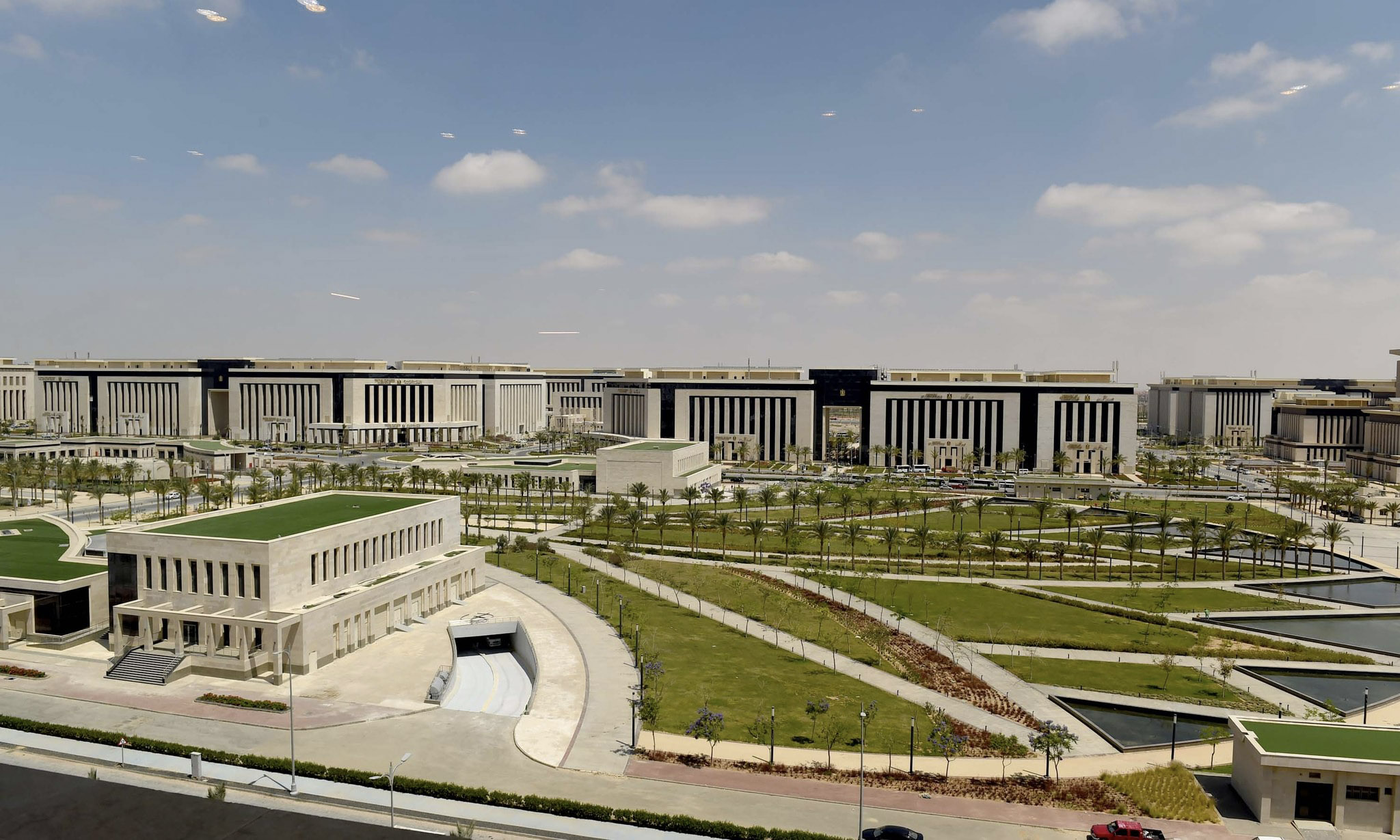
View of the Government District

When the project was officially announced in March 2015, it was revealed that the Egyptian military had already begun building a road from Cairo to the site of the future capital.

The proposed builder of the city was Capital City Partners, a private real estate investment firm led by Emirati businessman Mohamed Alabbar, but in September 2015, Egypt cancelled the memorandum of understanding (MoU) signed with Alabbar during the March economic summit, since they did not make any progress with the proposed plans.

In the same month Egypt signed a new MoU with China State Construction Engineering Corporation (CSCEC) to "study building and financing" the administrative part of the new capital, which will include ministries, government agencies and the president's office. However, CSCEC signed agreements with Egyptian authorities in 2017 to only develop the CBD.

This left the Egyptian government to finance and manage most of the construction, setting up the Administrative Capital Urban Development Company (ACUD) on 21 April 2016, an Egyptian state owned enterprise (SOE) whose major shareholders are the Ministry of Defense (National Service Products Organisation and the Armed Forces Land Projects Authority) holding 51% by in-kind contribution of the land, and the Ministry of Housing's New Urban Communities Authority (NUCA), holding 49% of the shares via capital injection of EGP 20bn (US$2.2bn in 2016) and an authorised capital of EGP 204bn (US$22bn).

ACUD manages the planning, subdivision, infrastructure construction and sale of land parcels in conjenction with the New Administrative Capital Development Authority affiliated to NUCA, as the latter does with its other new towns.

State-owned construction company Arab Contractors was called for constructing the water supply and sewage lines to the new capital.

== Landmarks ==
=== Green River Park ===
The Green River Park (also known as Capital Park or The Green Nile) is an urban park planned to extend along the entirety of the new capital, representing the Nile river. It is expected to be 35 kilometres (22 miles) long, aiming to be double the size of New York's Central Park. The initial phase of the park encompasses the first 10 kilometres (6.2 mi) and is under construction.

=== Mosques and cathedral ===
In January 2019, President Abdel Fattah al-Sisi inaugurated a large-scale mosque and a cathedral.

==== Al-Fattah al-Aleem Mosque ====
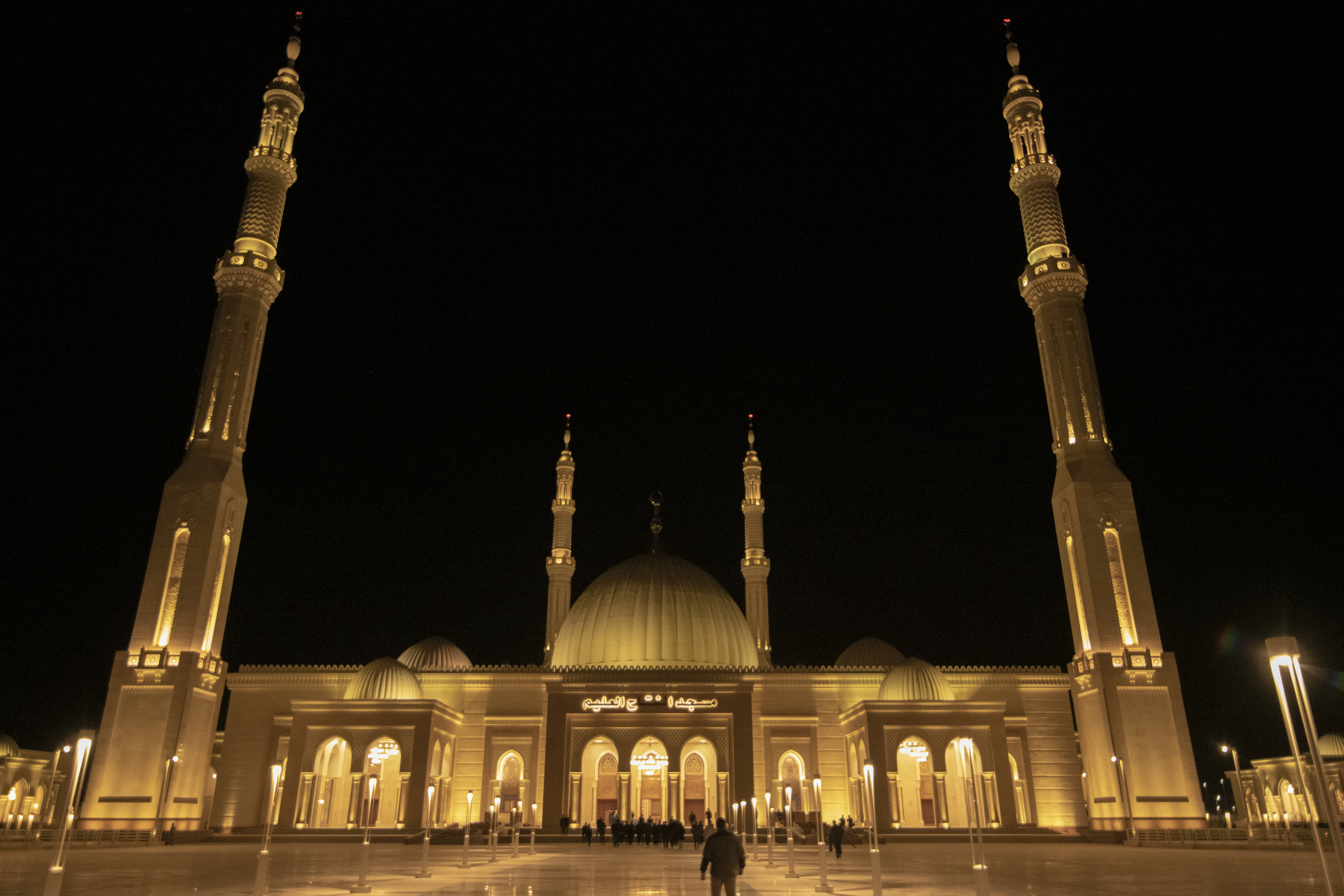
Al Fattah Al Aliem Mosque

Al-Fattah al-Aleem is a Sunni mosque with indoor and outdoor space for 17,000 worshipers, in addition to two Quran memorization houses for men and women and a library.

==== The Islamic Cultural Center (Grand Mosque) ====
The Islamic Cultural Center (Grand Mosque) is the largest mosque in Africa. The mosque is built in the Neo-Mamluk style and is on a hill overlooking the New Administrative Capital. It is the largest of mosque in Egypt and third largest in the Middle East.

==== The Nativity of Christ Cathedral ====
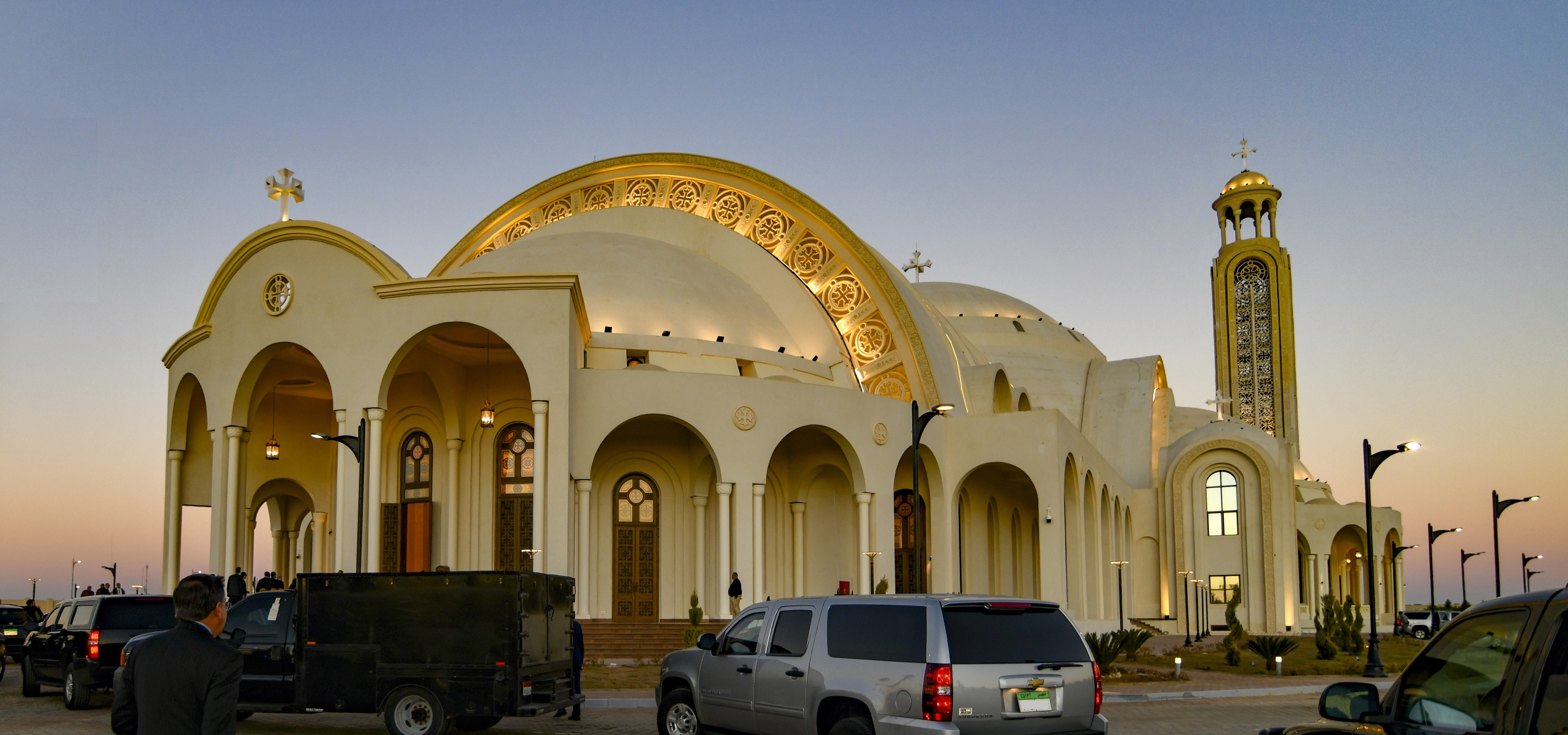
Cathedral of the Nativity of Christ

The Nativity of Christ is a Coptic Orthodox cathedral that can accommodate more than 8,000 worshippers. It is considered the largest of its kind in Egypt and the Middle East.

=== Skyscrapers and towers under construction ===
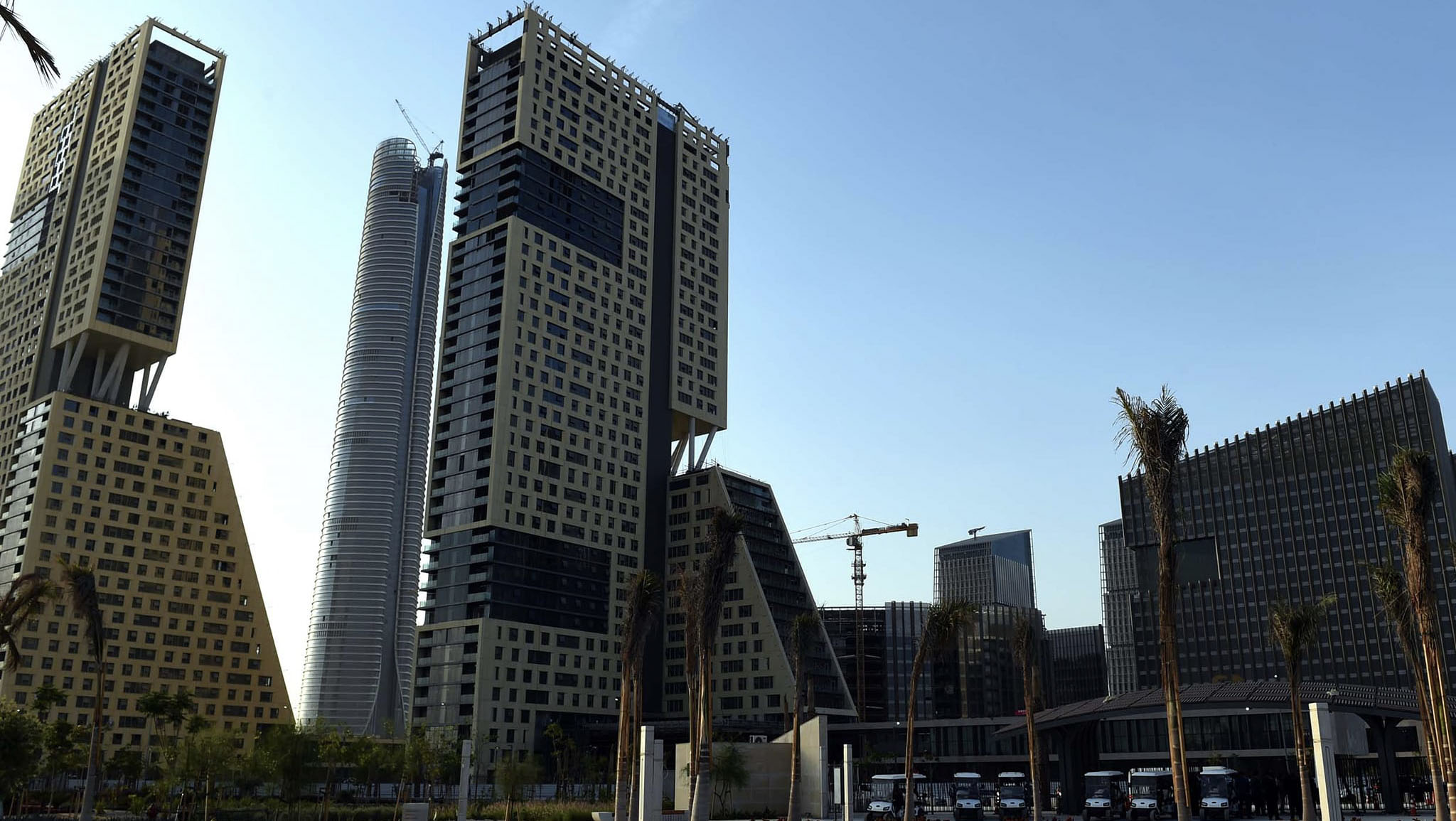

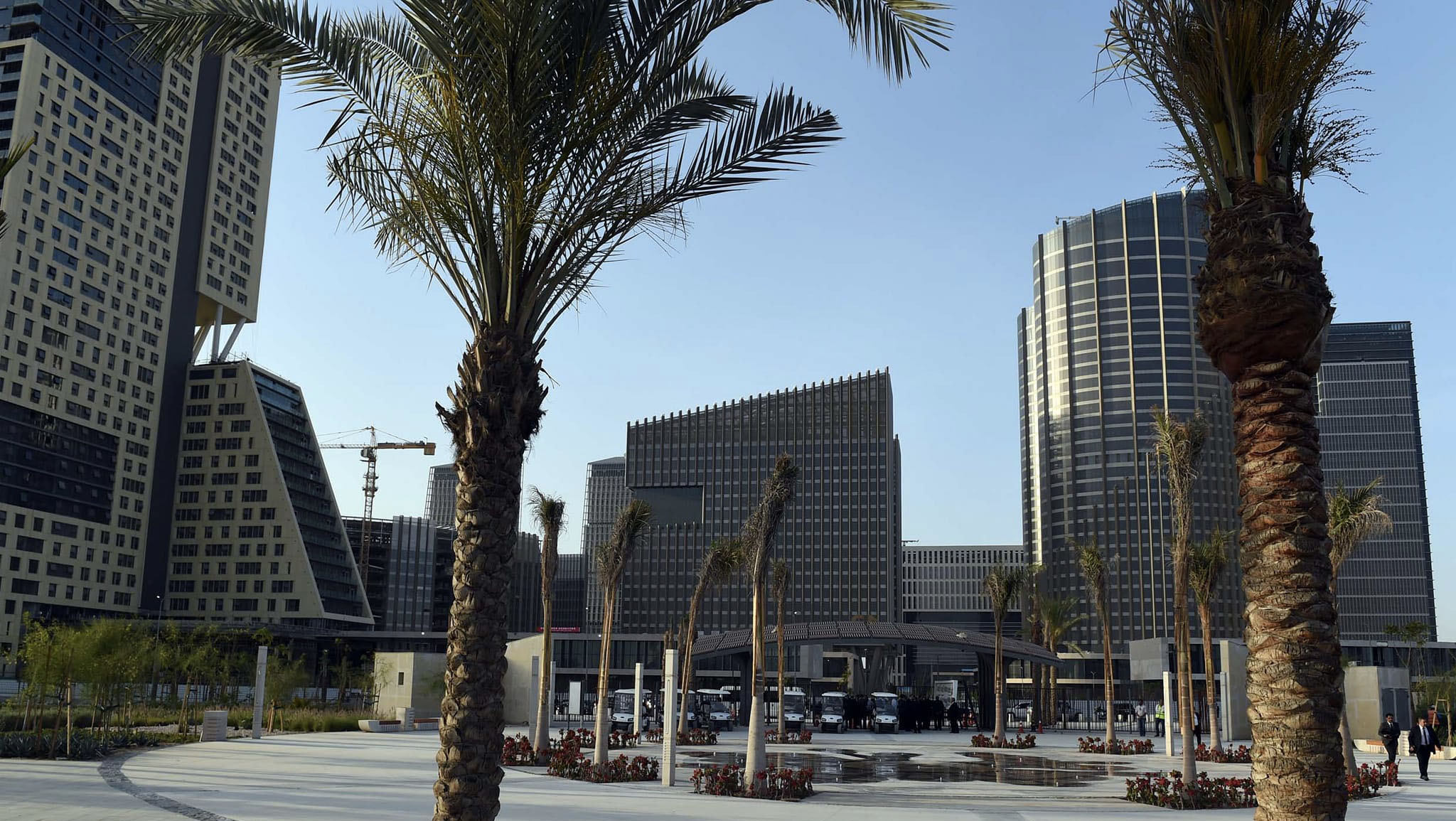
Skyscrapers and towers

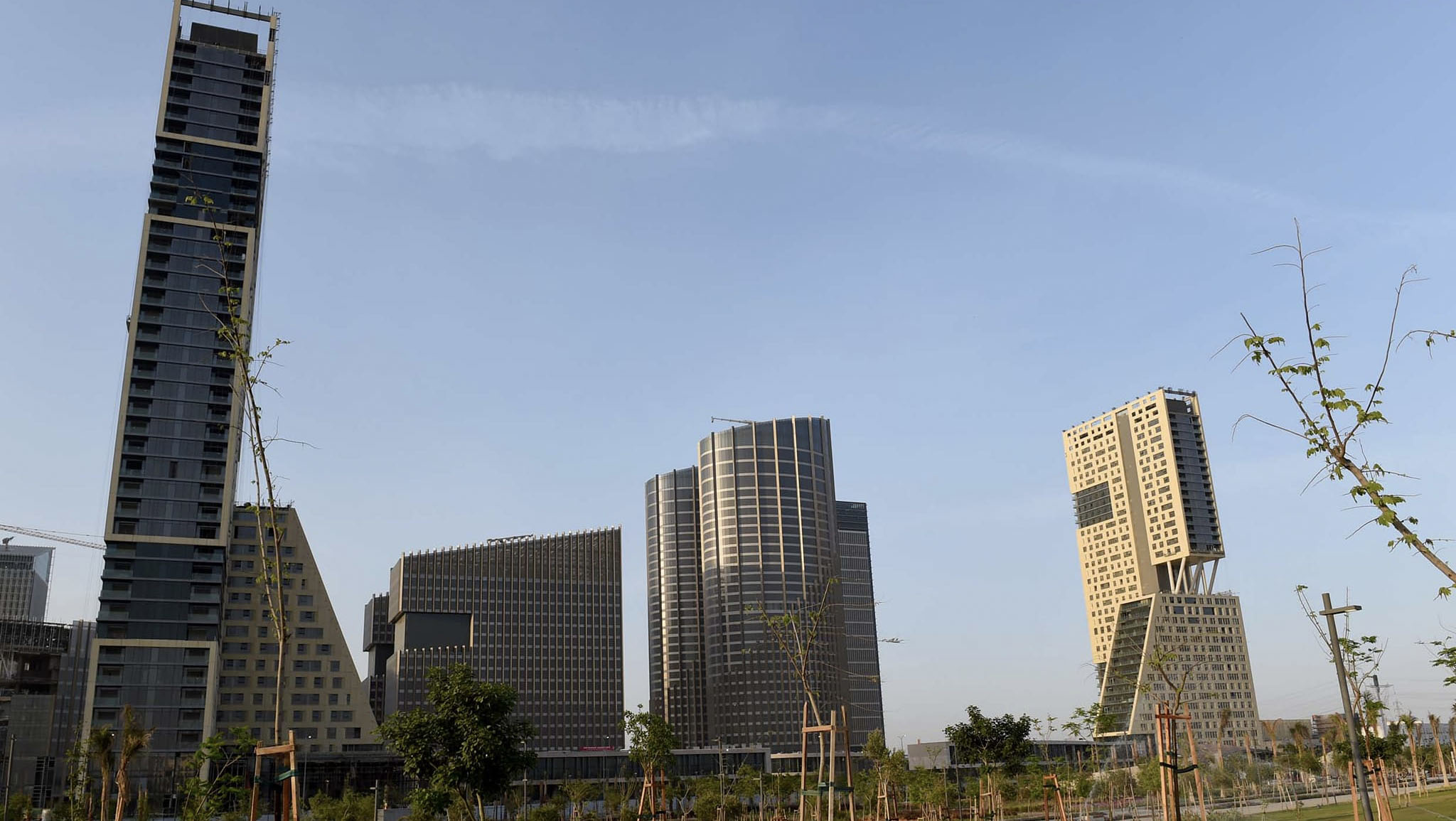

==== Iconic Tower ====
Over 30 skyscrapers are under construction, including the Iconic Tower, set to be Egypt and Africa's largest skyscraper.

=== MU10 ===
Rank	Name	Usage	Max height	Roof height	Floors	Started	Status	Total area	Notes
1	Iconic Tower	Hotel / Residential / Office	393.8 m (1,292 ft)	382.2 m (1,254 ft)	77	2019	Completed	260,000 m^{2} (2,798,617 sq ft)	Tallest building in Africa.
2	D01	Residential	196 m (643 ft)	196 m (643 ft)	49	2018	Completed	116,621 m^{2} (1,255,298 sq ft)	Tallest residential building in The New Capital.
3	D02	Residential	176 m (577 ft)	176 m (577 ft)	45	2018	Completed		
4	D03	Residential	176 m (577 ft)	176 m (577 ft)	45	2018	Completed		
5	C01	Office	174 m (571 ft)	174 m (571 ft)	35	2018	Completed		Tallest office building in Egypt.
6	C04	Office	170 m (558 ft)	170 m (558 ft)	34	2018	Completed		
7	C11	Office	160 m (525 ft)	160 m (525 ft)	27	2018	Completed		
8	C12	Office	160 m (525 ft)	160 m (525 ft)	27	2018	Completed		
9	C07	Office	159.9 m (525 ft)	159.9 m (525 ft)	32	2018	Completed		
10	C08	Office	159.9 m (525 ft)	159.9 m (525 ft)	32	2018	Completed		
11	D04	Residential	159.8 m (524 ft)	159.8 m (524 ft)	40	2018	Completed		
12	D05	Residential	152.5 m (500 ft)	152.5 m (500 ft)	38	2018	Completed		
13	C05	Office	95 m (312 ft)	95 m (312 ft)	18	2018	Completed		
14	C06	Office	95 m (312 ft)	95 m (312 ft)	18	2018	Completed		
15	C02	Office	85 m (279 ft)	85 m (279 ft)	16	2018	Completed		
16	C03	Office	85 m (279 ft)	85 m (279 ft)	16	2018	Completed		
17	C09	Hotel / Office	55 m (180 ft)	55 m (180 ft)	9	2018	Completed		Will feature a luxury 5-star hotel.
18	C10	Hotel / Office	55 m (180 ft)	55 m (180 ft)	9	2018	Completed		Will feature a luxury 5-star hotel.

=== MU7 Area ===
Name	Usage	Max height	Roof height	Floors	Started	Construction status	Developer
Capital Diamond Tower	Mixed-use	260 m (853 ft)		66	2021	Under construction	Amazon Holding developments
Forbes International Tower	Mixed-use	240 m (787 ft)		55	2026	Approved	Magnom Property
Taj Tower	Office & commercial	230 m (755 ft)		56	2026	Under construction	Taj Misr Developments
Taj Tower 2	Office & commercial	230 m (755 ft)		56	2026	Under construction	Taj Misr Developments
Infinity Tower	Mixed-use	230 m (755 ft)		40	2021	Under construction	Infinity for Urban Development
East Tower	Mixed-use	185 m (607 ft)	?	45	2022	Under construction	UC Developments
6ixty Iconic Tower	Mixed-use	180 m (591 ft)	?	44	2022	Under construction	AlBorouj Masr
Quan Tower	Mixed-use	110 m (361 ft)		25	2023	Under construction	Contact Developments
Central Iconic Hotel	Leisure and hospitality	~100 m (328 ft)		18	2023	Under construction	Modon Developments
Double Two Tower	Mixed-use	100 m (328 ft)		23	2022	Under construction	Nakheel Developments
Triton Tower	Mixed-use	80 m (262 ft)		14	2022	Under construction	RNA Developments
Ryan Tower	Mixed-use	75 m (246 ft)	?	15	2022	Under construction	Khaled Sabry Holding
PAVO Tower	Mixed-use	68 m (223 ft)	?	14	2022	Under construction	Mercon Developments

=== MU19 ===
Name	Usage	Max height	Roof height	Floors	Started	Construction status	Developer
Nile Business City Northeast Tower	Mixed-use	233 m (764 ft)		56	2022	Under construction	Nile Developments
Nile Business City Northwest Tower	Mixed-use	233 m (764 ft)		56	2022	Under construction	Nile Developments
Nile Business City West Tower	Mixed-use	233 m (764 ft)		56	2022	Under construction	Nile Developments
Tycoon Tower	Mixed-use	233 m (764 ft)		56	2022	Under construction	Nile Developments
Levels Business Tower	Mixed-use	145 m (476 ft)		36	2022	Under construction	Urbnlanes Developments
31North Tower	Mixed-use	131 m (430 ft)	?	36	2021	Under construction	Nile Developments
OIA Towers	Mixed-use	111 m (364 ft)		30	2021	Under construction	EDGE Holdings
Podia Tower	Mixed-use	110 m (361 ft)		29	2021	Under construction	Menassat Developments
Green River Tower	Mixed-use	110 m (361 ft)	?	30	2023	Under construction	Modon Developments
Obsideir Towers	Mixed-use	110 m (361 ft)	?	29	2022	Under construction	Dubai Developments
Monorail Tower	Mixed-use	100 m (328 ft)	?	26	2022	Under construction	ERG Developments
Pyramids Business Towers	Mixed-use	96 m (315 ft)	?	21	2022	Under construction	Pyramids Developments
I Business Park Towers	Mixed-use	91 m (299 ft)	?	20	2022	Under construction	ARQA Developments Group
Trio V Tower	Mixed-use	90 m (295 ft)	?	18	2022	Under construction	Nakheel Developments

=== Future proposed towers ===
==== Oblisco Capitale ====
The Oblisco Capitale is a planned and approved skyscraper set to be inaugurated in 2030. It is designed by the Egyptian architectural design firm IDIA in the form of a Pharaonic obelisk, and if built, it would be the tallest building in the world at a height of 1,000 metres (3,300 ft), surpassing the world's tallest tower, Burj Khalifa.

Name	Usage	Max height	Roof height	Floors	Started	Construction status	Total area	Notes
Oblisco Capitale Tower	Hotel, office and residential	1,000 m (3,281 ft)		210	?	Approved	?	World's tallest building; Projected completion 2030
Nut Tower	Office and residential	380 m (1,247 ft)		80	?	Approved	?	

== Infrastructure ==
=== Transport ===
==== Air ====
The New Capital is served by the Capital International Airport. It opened in 2019, simultaneously with the Sphinx International Airport, and is intended to relieve pressure on Cairo International Airport. The airport has an area of 16 square kilometres (6.2 sq mi) and includes a passenger terminal with a current capacity of 300 passengers per hour, eight parking spaces for aircraft, 45 service and administrative buildings, an air control tower and a 3,650 m (11,975 ft) runway suitable for receiving large aircraft, equipped with lighting and automatic landing systems.

==== Rail and roads ====
The Cairo Light Rail Transit (abbreviated LRT) connects Cairo to the New Administrative Capital. The line starts at Adly Mansour Station at Al Salam City on Cairo Metro Line 3, and splits into two branches at Badr City. One runs northward, parallel to the Cairo Ring Road, to 10th of Ramadan City, while the other turns south towards the New Administrative Capital. Intermediate cities along the train's route include Obour, Shorouk, and Mostaqbal.

In addition, a monorail line was opened in 2026 and connects Cairo to the new capital, with connections to the Cairo Metro and the Cairo LRT.

In January 2021, Egypt signed a contract with Siemens to construct a high speed rail line that extends from the northern Mediterranean city of El Alamein to Ain Sokhna city on the Red Sea passing through the new capital and Alexandria. The 450 km (280 mi) line is expected to be finished by 2023. After delays, Siemens released depictions of the high speed trains in November 2025.Later phases of the 1,750 km (1,087 mi) high speed network will connect the new capital with cities as far as Aswan in the south of Egypt.

=== Sport ===
==== Egypt International Olympic City ====
A whole "city/village" built as a sports complex for the country's possible bids for international sporting events, particularly the Olympic Games and the FIFA World Cup with more than 22 sporting facilities, one of which is the fourth biggest football stadium in the world. The Misr Stadium (also known as Sports City Stadium) opened in 2024 with a capacity of over 93,900 people; it is the largest stadium in Egypt and the second largest in Africa. The stadium is expected to replace the Cairo International Stadium as the new national stadium.

== Criticism ==
=== Social inequality ===
Many have criticized the city for being designed primarily for the upper classes rather than the middle and lower classes. This is not the first time the Egyptian government has attempted to build cities outside the Nile Delta and Valley to alleviate the overpopulation of Cairo. However, previous attempts have failed in their mission due to these cities being marketed to the upper-middle and upper classes. The high prices of the housing units made them unaffordable for the majority of the population, resulting in many of the units remaining unsold.

=== Economic impact ===
The Egyptian government's ability to finance the project has been put into question. Although President Abdel Fattah El-Sisi stated that "the state won't pay a penny" for the new capital, funds from the public coffers continue to flow into building the capital, adding to that the loans the government has acquired to fund the project, which has significantly increased the national debt and driven high inflation.

== See also ==
- List of purpose-built national capitals
- List of universities in Egypt
- Egypt Vision 2030
- New Cairo
- New Alamein
- Al Galala
