= Edward Durell Stone Jr. =

American landscape architect (1932–2009)

Edward Durell Stone Jr. (August 30, 1932 – July 10, 2009) was an American landscape architect.

== Biography ==
The son of the architect, Edward Durell Stone, he graduated from The Hill School, and then went on to Yale, where he received a degree in Architectural Design. Later he served three years as a pilot in the U.S. Air Force. This allowed him to see the world and the "natural beauty of the land", which played a role in his decision to pursue landscape architecture. He received his master's degree of Landscape Architecture from the Graduate School of Design at Harvard University. Stone began his career in 1959. Initially, he practiced under another Fort Lauderdale architect, but soon became self-employed and founded EDSA. The firm began to prosper while collaborating on projects with Stone's father.

Stone's career continued after getting its boost in 1960 when he created his firm, Edward Durell Stone Jr. and Associates or EDSA. One of his first international assignments took him to Managua, Nicaragua, where he designed the garden of the residence of Nicaragua's principal Caterpillar and John Deere Owner, Carlos Gómez Argüello, located in the then high-end Bolonia residential neighborhood. After the home was sold to the German Government, it became the combined official chancery and residence of the German Ambassador to that country for at least two decades. By 1991, it was the unanimous opinion among interviewed principals of large and small firms that Stone's firm was among the top five.(Landscape Architecture, 60). Stone's work and career greatly impacted tourism and community-living in the United States, especially in Florida, as well as in the Caribbean and Europe.(Gillette, 75) In Landscape Architecture Magazine, Jane Brown Gillette reports that Stone realized what he wanted to do at age seventeen while attending a dinner dance at the Everglades Club in Palm Beach, Florida. Here the scenery within the building's courtyard affected him in such a way that would eventually have an effect on many landscapes throughout Florida and the Caribbean and on the profession of landscape architecture through his work.

Stone was elected a Fellow of the American Society of Landscape Architects, and he received the 1994 ASLA Medal. The medal "is the highest honor the American Society of Landscape Architects (ASLA) may bestow upon a landscape architect whose lifetime achievements and contributions to the profession have had a unique and lasting impact on the welfare of the public and the environment." Stone had three consecutive four-year terms on the U.S. Commission of Fine Arts, appointed by Presidents Nixon, Ford, and Carter, and was a consultant to the Committee for a More Beautiful Capital in Washington, D.C., and to the Governor's Conference on Environmental Quality in the State of Florida.

At EDSA, Stone continued to play a role in directing the charettes that begin most projects, and he participated in design reviews (Gillete, 77). Gillette says EDSA specializes in recreation-based communities and resorts, both national and international. The firm also does work in urban and campus design, in places of entertainment and attraction, and in environment and ecotourism. Some of EDSA's main projects include Disney World's West Side, Euro Disneyland, Riverwalk in Fort Lauderdale, the Fort Lauderdale Beach Revitalization, El Conquistador Resort and Country Club, and Hyatt Regency Aruba Resort and Casino. Stone and his firm have become recognized for their expertise in planning and design for resort and community development. The projects in Fort Lauderdale, voted best city of its size in 1994, have helped make the city a tourist destination (Gillette, 91). In designing these places, Stone says they try to create "an idealized place, what the environment would be if everything were right in the world."(Gillette, 78)
