= State Strategic Command Center =

New headquarters for the Egyptian Ministry of Defense

- مركز قيادة الدولة الإستراتيجي
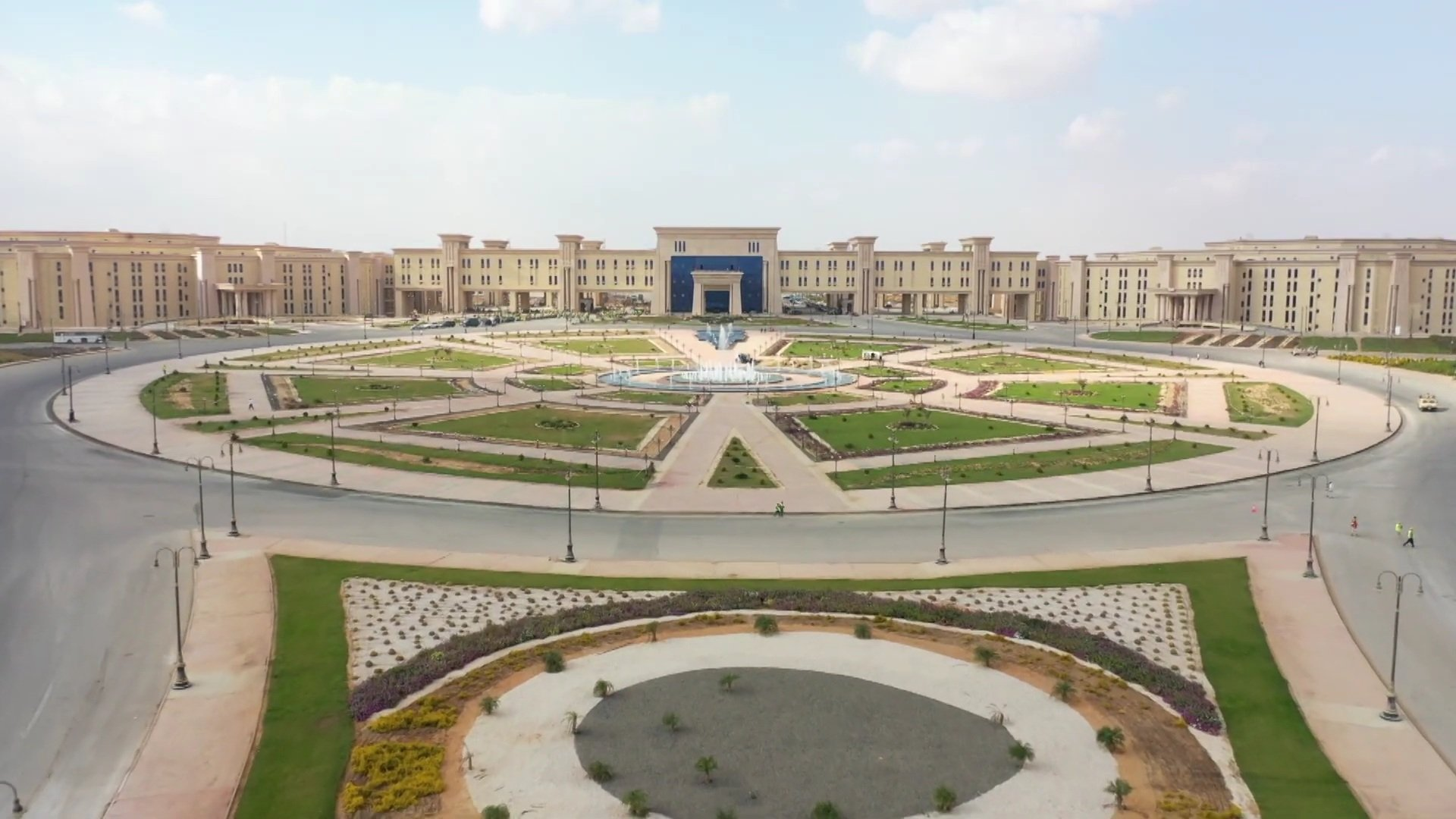
- Front view
- Alternative names: The Octagon

General information
- Status: Inaugurated
- Architectural style: Ancient Egyptian
- Location: The New Capital, Egypt
- Coordinates: 29°56′16.5″N 31°39′14.1″E
- Construction started: 2018
- Owner: Ministry of Defense

Technical details
- Floor count: 5
- Floor area: 50,590,378 square feet (4,700,000 m^{2})

The State Strategic Command Center (Arabic: مركز قيادة الدولة الإستراتيجي), commonly known as the Octagon (Arabic: الأوكتاجون), is the headquarters for the Egyptian Ministry of Defense. Its construction was part of a much larger initiative of moving all governmental offices to The New Capital. The establishment of the new headquarters aims to be the largest in the Middle East and the world, located in The New Capital, Greater Cairo.

The headquarters extends over a total area of 22,000 acres (89 km^{2}; 960,000,000 ft^{2}), with about 50,500,000 square feet (1,160 acres; 4,690,000 m^{2}) of it serving as floor area. It includes 13 zones, each with its own specific role, making it the largest defense headquarters and office building complex in the world, surpassing the Pentagon in the United States. The Octagon is a part of a big establishment, which as a whole has worship venues, clubs, hotels, schools, playgrounds, residential projects, shopping malls, hospitals, and complexes for civil and administrative services. The place is secured by two Republican Guard units, and other means of security.

== The Six Centers ==
The State Strategic Command Center is composed of six centers:

1. The Unified Strategic Data Center – has all the data of the state institutions.
2. The Control Center of the Strategic Network – controls the administrative body of the state.
3. State Utilities Management and Operation Center – controls state agencies and facilities.
4. Telecommunications Network Control Center – ensures the stability of communications nationwide.
5. Emergencies and Safety Center – governs emergency services and field security services.
6. Weather Forecast Center – prepares the state defense center in case of any natural calamities.

In addition to a number of warehouses that secure the country's needs of strategic goods.

== Structure ==
The Octagon acquired its name because of its octagonal architectural design, made up of the eight outer octagon-shaped buildings, thus representing all eight branches of the Egyptian Armed Forces. The entity as a whole consists of 10 buildings, 8 of which are external and two internal ones. Each building has eight facets connected to each other, with corridors connected to the heart of the structure known as the "main building," which is located in the middle. While there are 2 central ministerial buildings located in the center of the octagonal structure, both connected to each other and to the rest of the eight external buildings by longitudinal corridors.

== Design and architecture ==
The Egyptian Ministry of Defense/Ministry of War headquarters' architecture was influenced by Ancient Egyptian architecture, using pillars to support the buildings in a Pharaonic style.

== See also ==
- Crescent Star
- Beijing Military City
