= EDSA (company) =

American landscaping and design firm

EDSA, Inc.
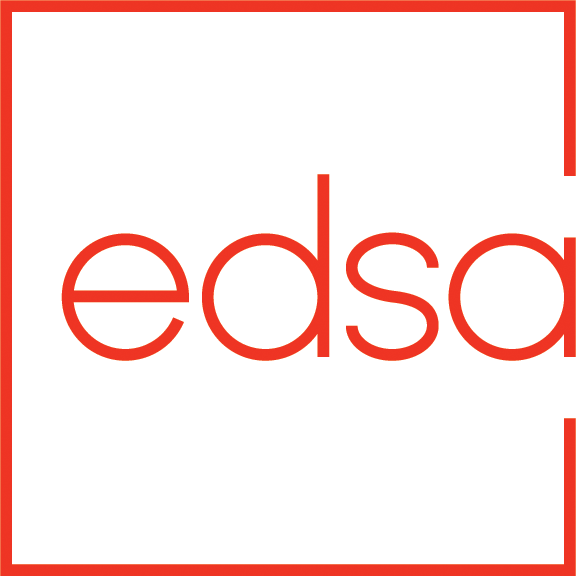
- Industry: Landscape architecture, urban design
- Founded: 1960; 66 years ago
- Founder: Edward Durell Stone, Jr.
- Headquarters: Fort Lauderdale, Florida, United States
- Services: Planning, landscape architecture, urban design
- Number of employees: 150+
- Website: edsaplan.com

EDSA, Inc., (formerly known as Edward Durell Stone, Jr., and Associates), is an American firm specializing in planning, landscape architecture, and urban design. EDSA was founded in 1960 and is headquartered in Fort Lauderdale, Florida, with additional offices in Orlando, Florida; Raleigh, North Carolina; New York City; Baltimore, Maryland; as well as Shanghai, China.

EDSA states that it prioritizes sustainability in its planning and design processes.

== History ==
EDSA was founded in 1960 by American landscape architect Edward Durell Stone, Jr. After Stone, Jr.'s death in 2009, Douglas C. Smith, who had been with the firm since 1987, became president.

In the 1960s, EDSA worked on resort and recreation projects in the Caribbean, Latin America, and the Southeastern United States.

In 1971, Stone, Jr. was appointed to the Commission of Fine Arts in Washington, D.C. by President Richard Nixon and served for 12 years. During this period, EDSA expanded its international presence with projects in the Middle East, Europe, and South America, emphasizing local cultural sensitivity and collaboration with local professionals.

EDSA's urban design work includes the Fort Lauderdale Beach Revitalization in 1986 and the Riverwalk Linear Park completed in 1994, both aimed at revitalizing urban waterfronts in Fort Lauderdale.

The firm's work in the 1990s included planning for academic institutions such as the College of Staten Island and Nova Southeastern University, as well as cultural venues like the Florida Nature Cultural Center. The Orlando branch office handled projects for the Disney Corporation and the Orlando International Airport. In 1994, Joseph Lalli became President of EDSA and later established EDSA Orient, a joint venture in Beijing. He was Chairman from 2012 until his death in 2014. J. Robert Behling is the current Chairman of the firm.

=== Corporate structure ===
EDSA is a privately held company. As of 2019, B. Scott LaMont is the CEO.
