= Al-Fattah al-Aleem Mosque =

Mosque in New Administrative Capital of Egypt

- مَسجِد الفَتّاح العَليم
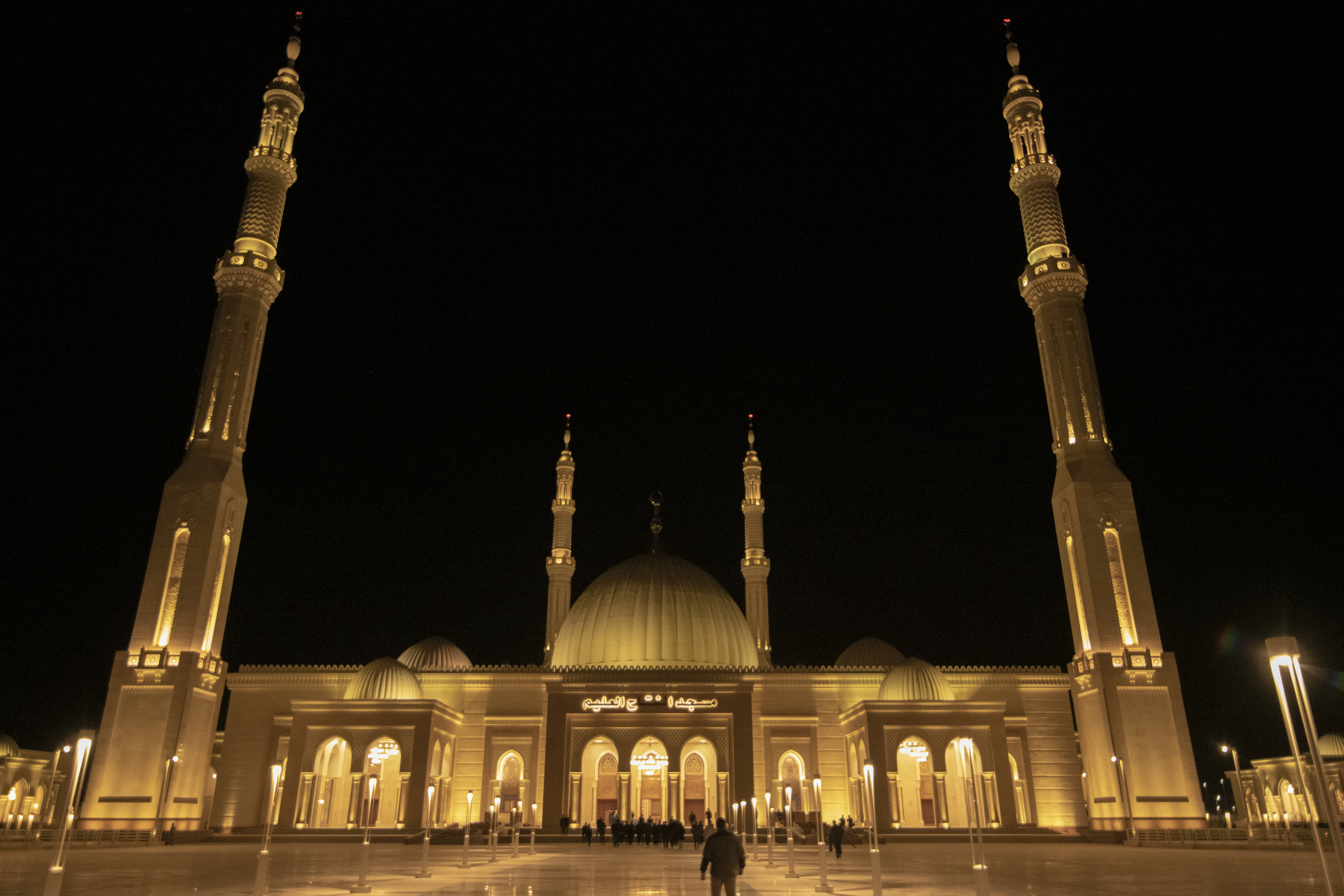

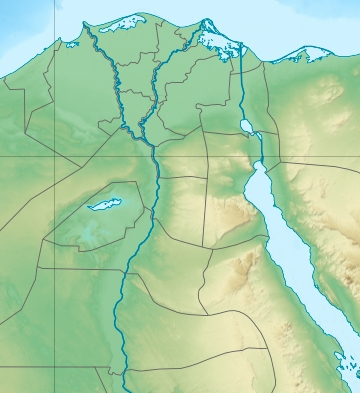
- Location of the mosque in Northern Egypt

Religion
- Affiliation: Islam
- Ecclesiastical or organisational status: Mosque
- Status: Active

Location
- Location: New Administrative Capital, Cairo Governorate, Northern Egypt
- Country: Egypt
- Interactive map of Al-Fattah al-Aleem Mosque
- Coordinates: 30°01′11″N 31°36′08″E

Architecture
- Type: Mosque
- Style: Islamic-Fatimid
- General contractor: Arab Contractors
- Completed: 2019

Specifications
- Capacity: 17,000 worshippers
- Dome: 21
- Dome height (outer): 15 to 44 m (49 to 144 ft)
- Dome dia. (inner): 5 to 33 m (16 to 108 ft)
- Minaret: 4
- Minaret height: 95 m (312 ft)
- Site area: 44.55 ha (110.1 acres)

The al-Fattah al-Aleem Mosque (Arabic: مَسجِد الفَتّاح العَليم, romanized: masjid al-fattāḥ al-ʿalīm) is a mosque located on the New Middle Ring Road in the New Capital, in the Cairo Governorate, in Northern Egypt.

The mosque has a capacity of nearly 17,000 worshippers and is considered the second largest mosque in Egypt, after the Islamic Cultural Center, or Grand Mosque, and is considered one of the world's mega-mosques. The site occupies 44.55 hectares (110.1 acres) (106 feddans). The mosque was inaugurated by Abdel Fattah el-Sisi, the president of Egypt, on 6 January 2019, and he witnessed the inauguration of the Nativity of the Christ Cathedral on the same day.

== Size and construction ==
Built on a total area of 45 hectares (110 acres), the mosque is considered the second largest mosque in the world in terms of total area. With a landing field, car parking for 2,650 cars, services and an administrative building that accommodates 60 workers for the mosque operation. The green area represents one third of the total area of the mosque which is equivalent to 120,000 square metres (30 acres). The roads represent 10% from the total area of about 45,000 square metres (11 acres).

The Armed Forces Engineering Authority was keen on using the Egyptian marble in the mosque works and wanted the construction to be done by Egyptian workers only. The execution of the mosque was done in 15 months, starting on 16 June 2017 and within six months the concrete and construction works were done, the finishing works took nine months starting from April 2018 to December 2018.

== Architecture ==
The mosque is surrounded by 3,150 metres (10,330 ft) of fencing.

Completed in the Fatimid style, the four minarets are 95 metres (312 ft) high each, without the crown and the crescent; and are equivalent to 31 floors in height. Each minaret has four balconies. The minarets are topped with 4.5-metre (15 ft) stainless steel crescents, treated with PVD, to give it the bright golden colour.

The mosque has 21 domes. The main dome is 33 metres (108 ft) in diameter, 44 metres (144 ft) high, and weighs 4,500 tonnes (5,000 short tons). There are four secondary domes, each 11.75 metres (38.5 ft) in diameter and are 9 metres (30 ft) above the mosque's ceiling and 24 metres (79 ft) higher than ground level. There are six domes above the entrances, each 7.5 metres (25 ft) in diameter and 7 metres (23 ft) above the entrance ceilings and 19 metres (62 ft) above ground level. There are ten domes above the iwans, each 5 metres (16 ft) in diameter and are 3.1 metres (10 ft) above the iwan and 15 metres (49 ft) above the ground level of each iwan.

The mosque nave is 6,325 square metres (68,080 sq ft) and can accommodate 6,300 worshippers with five main entrances, plus two entrances for women. In addition, the 3,400-square-metre (37,000 sq ft) sahn can accommodate 3,400 worshippers.

The mosque complex includes two Qur'an memorization houses for boys and girls that comprise 340 square metres (3,700 sq ft), a 395-square-metre (4,250 sq ft) library, administrative offices, a generator chamber with two electrical control rooms, stores, a conference room for 40 people equipped with 94 WCs for men and women, and a water tank with a capacity of 3,500 cubic metres (120,000 cu ft).

== See also ==
A video of the mosque.

- Islam in Egypt
- List of mosques in Cairo
