= Cathedral of the Nativity of Christ, Cairo =

Cathedral of the Nativity of Christ
- كاتدرائية ميلاد المسيح
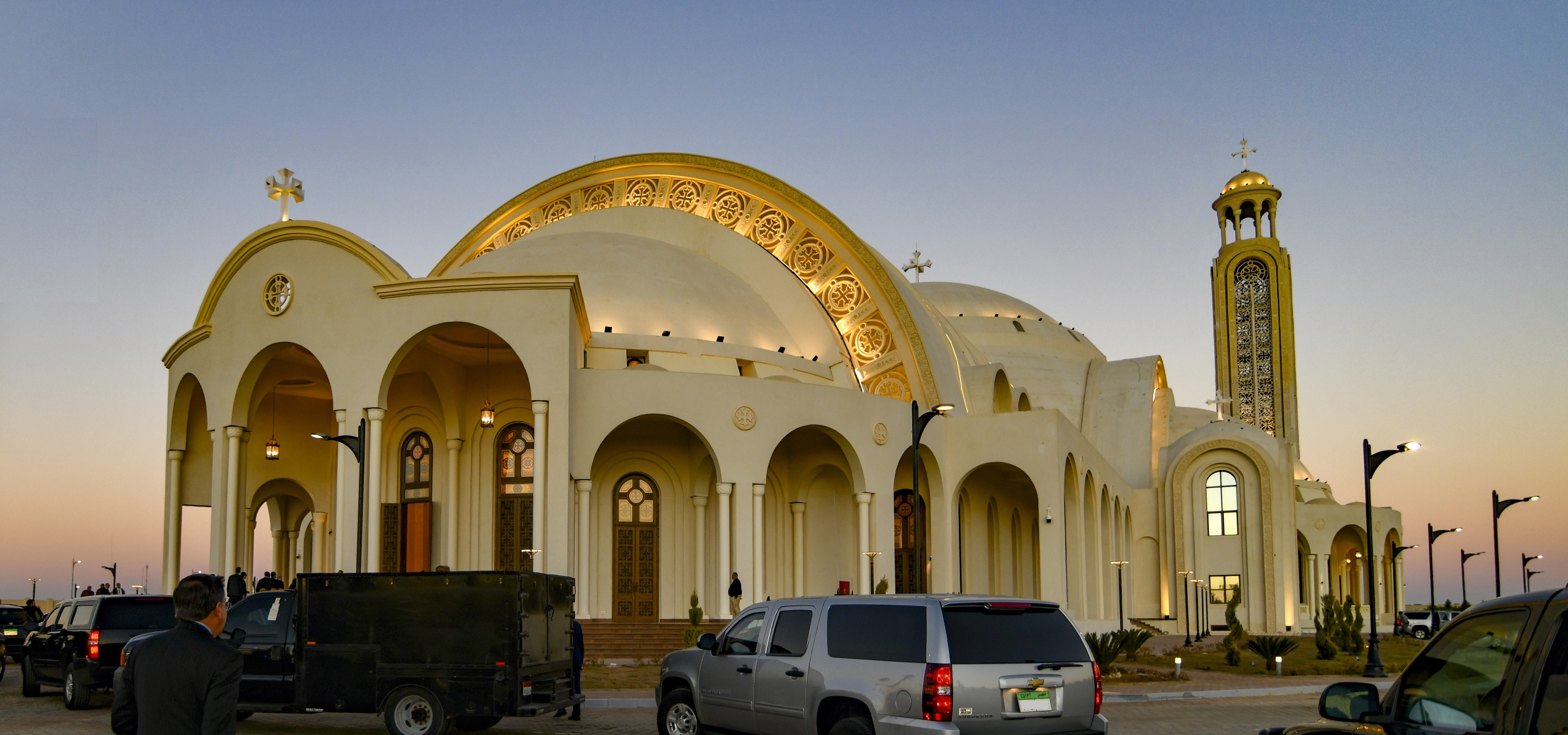
- Cathedral of the Nativity of Christ
- 29°58′52.3″N 31°43′15.1″E
- Location: New Administrative Capital
- Country: Egypt
- Denomination: Coptic Orthodox Church of Alexandria

History
- Founder: Pope Tawadros II
- Dedication: Nativity of Jesus
- Consecrated: 6 January 2019

Architecture
- Style: Coptic

Specifications
- Capacity: 8,200 people
- Length: 144.5 m (474 ft)
- Width: 91.5 m (300 ft)
- Height: 45 m (148 ft) (dom - top cross); 40 m (130 ft) (top dom)

Clergy
- Bishop: Pope Tawadros II of Alexandria

The Cathedral of the Nativity of Christ (Coptic: ⲡⲓⲉⲣⲫⲉⲓ ⲛ̀ⲕⲁⲑⲉⲇⲣⲁ ⲛ̀ⲧⲉ ⲡϫⲓⲛⲙⲓⲥⲓ ⲙ̀ⲡⲭⲣⲓⲥⲧⲟⲥ, romanized: Pi-erfey EnKathedhra Ente Epjinmisi EmPi-Ekhrestos, lit. 'Temple Cathedral of the Nativity of Christ'; Arabic: كاتدرائية ميلاد المسيح, romanized: Kātidrāʾiyya Mīlād al-Masīḥ) is a Coptic Orthodox cathedral in The New Capital, Egypt, some 45 km east of Cairo. It was commissioned by the President of Egypt Abdel Fattah el-Sisi and inaugurated on 6 January 2019 by President el-Sisi and the Pope of the Coptic Orthodox Church of Alexandria Tawadros II. It is the largest church in the Middle East, and the largest Oriental Orthodox church in the world by area.

== History ==
In January 2017, following twin terrorist attacks that killed at least 29 Coptic Egyptians at St. Peter and St. Paul's Church in Cairo in December 2016, the President of Egypt Abdel Fattah el-Sisi commissioned the construction of the country's largest mosque and church in the new administrative capital to become symbols of coexistence and national unity. For decades, the building of churches in Egypt was restricted to avoid offending Islam. However, in August 2017, the Parliament of Egypt removed the legal restrictions that limited the construction of new churches. The cathedral was built by the Egyptian presidency and by engineers from the Egyptian Armed Forces.

It was inaugurated on 6 January 2019 by President el-Sisi and Pope Tawadros II of Alexandria, the Pope of the Coptic Orthodox Church of Alexandria. On the same day of the inauguration, Divine Liturgy was celebrated in the chapel of the cathedral with the participation of some 3,000 people that included representatives from all over the country.

At the inauguration, President el-Sisi said,

"I want to say that this moment is very important in our history, because when I was at St Mark's Cathedral a year ago, I told the pope that we would be celebrating the completion of the mosque and the cathedral, and here we are standing together with the promise fulfilled. This occasion is a message that we will not allow anybody to come between us, and I do not like to use the term sectarian strife because Muslims and Christians in Egypt are one, and will stay one. This occasion represents a tree of love which we have planted together, but this tree still needs attention and care so that its fruit reaches from Egypt to the whole world. Strife will not end, but God saved Egypt and he will continue to do so for the sake of its people."

The Al-Fattah Al-Aleem Mosque was also inaugurated on the same day. Imam Sheikh Ahmed El-Tayeb called it "the embodiment of the soul of brotherhood and love".

== Architecture ==
The design of the cathedral is inspired by Noah's Ark in accordance with Coptic tradition. It contains a main square and papal headquarters, a reception hall, a meeting room and administrative offices. It also has a two-story underground garage, service building, and two bell towers. The bell towers are Coptic in design.

== See also ==
- List of largest church buildings in the world
- List of largest domes
