= Capital International Airport (Egypt) =

Airport in the New Capital, Egypt

Capital International Airport مطار العاصمة الدولي
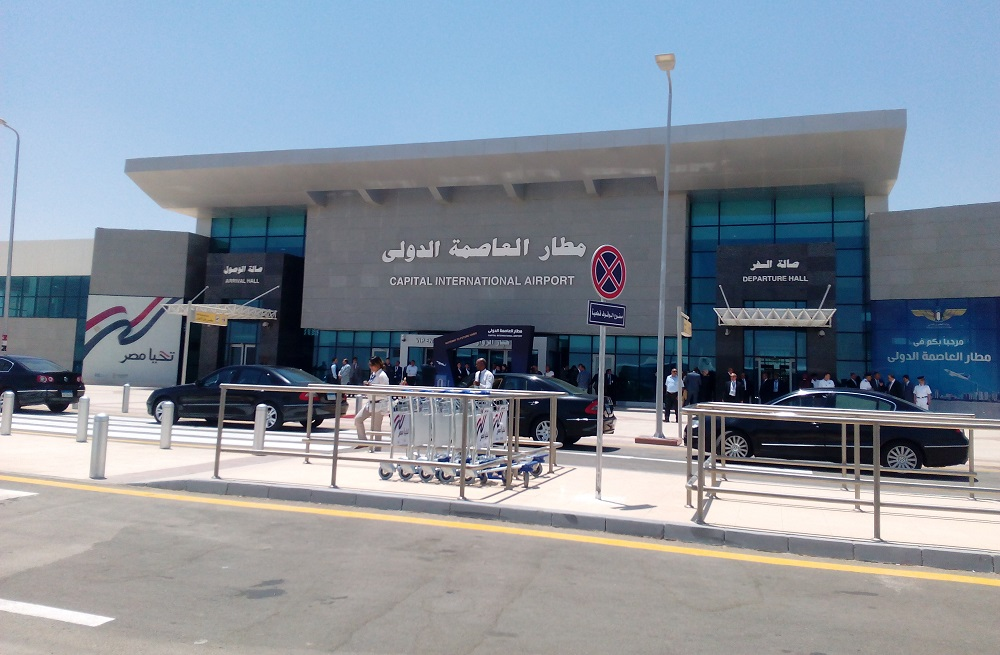
- IATA: CCE; ICAO: HECP

Summary
- Operator: Egyptian Airports Company (EAC)
- Location: The New Capital
- Opened: 2019
- Time zone: UTC (+2)
- Elevation AMSL: 833 ft / 254 m
- Coordinates: 30°04′33″N 31°50′00″E

Map

Runways
Direction	Length		Surface
Direction	ft	m	Surface
01L/19R	11,980	3,650	Asphalt
01R/19L	11,980	3,650	Asphalt
- Source: Skyvector

Capital International Airport (Arabic: مطار العاصمة الدولي) (IATA: CCE, ICAO: HECP) is the primary international airport serving the New Administrative Capital of Egypt. It is located approximately 45 km (28 miles) east of Cairo and was built at the same time as the Sphinx International Airport, west of Cairo. The airport has an area of 16 square kilometres (6.2 mi^{2}) and is expected to partially ease pressure on Cairo International Airport and Sphinx International Airport.

The airport was inaugurated by the president of Egypt, Abdel Fattah el-Sisi and was opened by the Egyptian Airports Company on 9 July 2019 for a one-month trial period (300 hourly passengers), and with commercial operations commencing in 2020. The main contractor of the airport is Hassan Allam Holding, it is operated by the Egyptian Airports Company and owned by the Egyptian Armed Forces.

== Facilities ==
Capital International Airport has a main building covering an area of 5,000 square metres (54,000 ft^{2}) and its land facilities have a capacity of 1 million passengers/year (expandable) that aims to serve the public as well as petroleum companies, private jets and air taxi flights. The terminal building sits on a ground floor area of 3,500 square metres (38,000 ft^{2}). The airport includes a passenger terminal with a current capacity of 300 passengers per hour, eight parking spaces for aircraft, 45 service and administrative buildings, an air control tower and a 3,650-metre (11,980 ft) runway suitable for receiving large aircraft, equipped with lighting and automatic landing systems.

== Airlines and destinations ==
The following airlines operate regular scheduled and charter flights at Capital International Airport:

Airlines	Destinations
Air Cairo	Jeddah
Smartwings	Seasonal charter: Bratislava, Prague

== See also ==
- List of airports in Egypt
- Transport in Egypt
- Cairo International Airport
- Sphinx International Airport
- New Administrative Capital of Egypt
