= Kuwait International Quran Recitation Competition =

International Quran recitation competition

- Awarded for: Quran Recitation
- Sponsored by: Government of Kuwait; Ministry of Religion of Kuwait
- Date: 2009; 17 years ago
- Country: Kuwait
- First award: 2009
- Website: https://www.awqaf.gov.kw

Kuwait International Quran Recitation Competition is an international Quran recitation competition organized by the Quran Recitation and the Ministry of Religion of Kuwait. This competition is widely known as the Kuwait Quran Award. About 60-70 countries participate. The competition started in 2009 under the initiative of the Government of Kuwait. The king of Kuwait is usually present as the main figure of the competition, and he is the one who awards the winners. Either at the famous Crowne Plaza Hotel in Kuwait.

== Purpose of Award ==
Kuwait is one of the strongest economies in the world. That is why they have taken this initiative to spread the meaning of Quran in the Muslim world by spending money on Islamic works. This international organization of Quran recitation has some objectives.

- To make efforts to reach the education of Islam and Quran to the younger generation of Kuwait.
- To inspire reading and recitation of Quran and to inculcate Islamic beliefs and concepts in their minds.
- Creating a spirit of competition in reciting and memorizing the Quran.
- To respect those who learn the Quran and memorize the Quran to the people of the society.
- Presenting the Islamic face of the state to the Muslim world, emphasizing its role in serving the people of the Islamic world,
- Honoring, and encouraging personalities serving Muslims and Islam throughout the world.

== See also ==
- Indonesia International Quran Competition
- Iran International Holy Quran Competition
- Tijan an Nur International Quran Competition
- Dubai International Holy Quran Award
- Malaysia International Quran Competition
- Egypt International Hefzul Quran Competition
- Libya International Holy Quran Competition
