= Egypt International Holy Quran Competition =

International Quran Competition at Egypt

- Awarded for: Quran memorizing and reciting
- Sponsored by: Government of Egypt; Ministry of Awqaf and Islamic Affairs Of Egypt; Al-Azhar University
- Date: 1993; 33 years ago
- Country: Egypt
- Reward: 1st: 1,80,000 pounds 2nd: 1,20,000 pounds 3rd: 90,000 pounds

Egypt International Holy Quran Competition is an international Quran recitation and telawat competition. This international competition is organized by the Egyptian government every year according to Hijri New Year. Since 1993, this event has been regularly organized in Cairo, the capital of Egypt, with the active participation of at least 66 countries. The event is organized by the Ministry of Religion of Egypt and coordinated by Al-Azhar University.

== Arrangement purpose ==
The purpose of this international Quran competition and award organized in Egypt is to serve Allah's Quran and raise the general level of Quranic performance through acts of service.

== See more ==
- Dubai International Holy Quran Award
- Muhammad VI Awards for the Holy Quran
- The Royal Award For Islamic Finance
- International Quran Recital Competition
- Islamic Republic of Iran's International Holy Quran Competition
- Libya International Holy Quran Competition
- Tijan an Nur International Quran Competition
