= Muhammad Tariqul Islam =

Bangladeshi Quran Hafez

Md Tariqul Islam
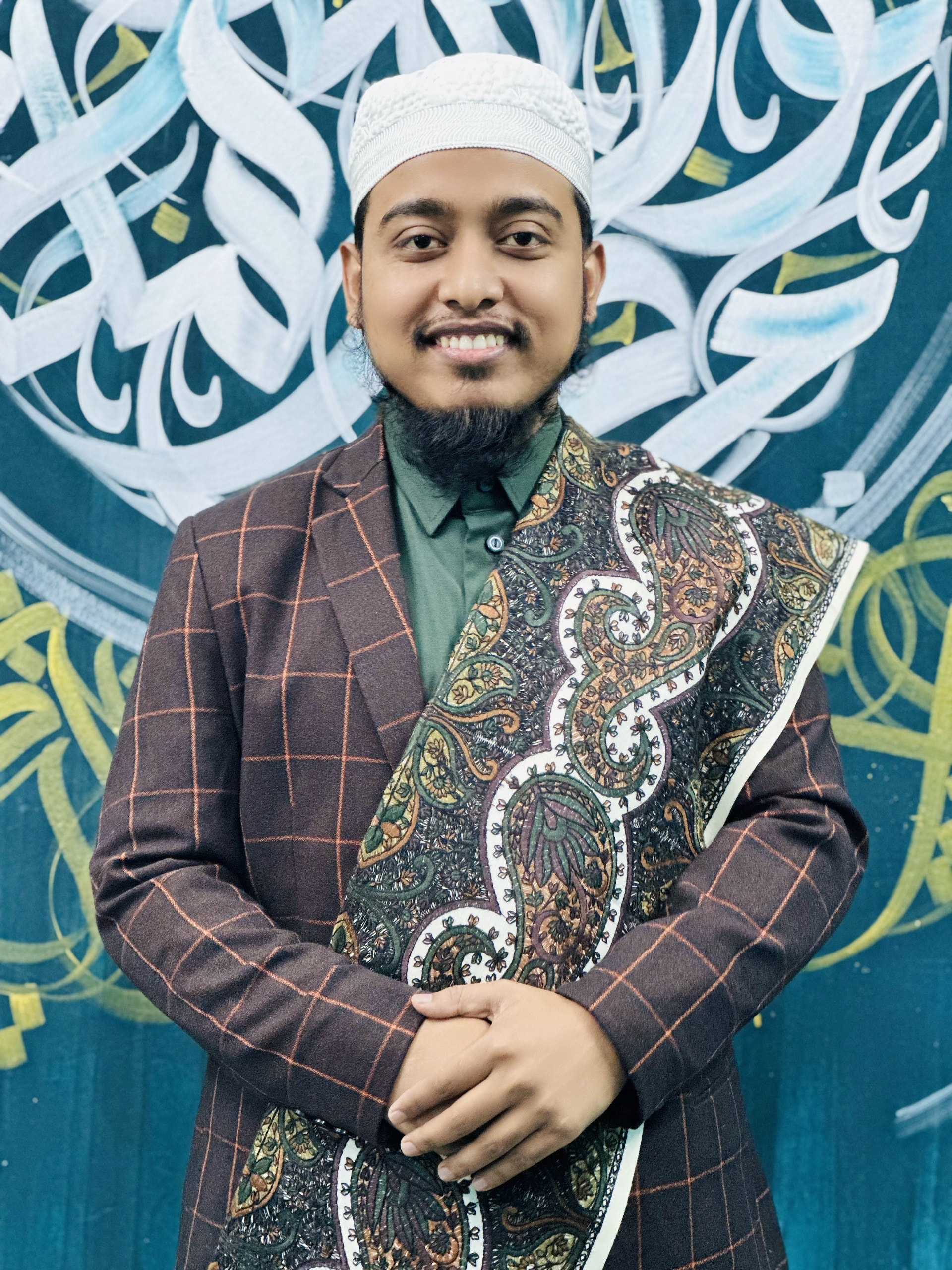
- Born: June 1, 2004; Maligaon village, Daudkandi Upazila, Comilla District
- Education: Markazut Tahfiz International Madrasa
- Years active: 2022-present
- Known for: International Award Winning Quran Memorizer
- Television: Banglavision
- Father: Md. Abu Bakr Siddique

Muhammad Tariqul Islam is a Bangladeshi Hafez of the Quran. He won the first place in the Quran recitation at the 21st edition of Dubai International Holy Quran Award in 2017. Competitors from 103 countries of the world participated in this competition. He also stood fourth in the 'Surela Kantha' category of the event. In all, he received two and a half lakh dirhams (about 56 lakh taka) in prize money.

== Early life ==
Tariqul Islam was born in 2004 in Maligaon village of Daudkandi upazila of Comilla District. His father's name is Md. Abu Bakar Siddique, a retired high school teacher, currently leads a mosque in Dhaka. His mother is a housewife, staying with the family in her village Maligaon. Tariqul is the fifth child among his seven brothers and sisters. He studied at Markazut Tahfil International Madrasah located in Jatrabari, Dhaka. Apart from this he is also studying in Aliya Madrasa. In this Madrasah he is learning Quran recitation from Hafez Neshar Ahmad An Nashiri.

== Awards ==
He participated in the International Qur'an Recitation Competition after being selected in the internal national level Quran recitation competition of Bangladesh. Awards received by him:

- In 2014, 2nd place in "Light of Quran" contest on Machranga Television.
- 6th place in Banglavision "Light of the Holy Quran" competition in 2015.
- 5th place in PHP Qur'an Alo contest on NTV in 2017.
- 2nd place in Huffazul Quran Foundation's "National Hifazul Quran Competition" in 2017.
- 1st place in Quran Recitation in Dubai International Quran Competition in 2017.
- Also 4th place in Dubai International Quran Competition Melody category in 2017.

== See also ==
- Saleh Ahmad Takrim
