= Saleh Ahmad Takrim =

Bangladeshi Quran Hafiz (born 2008)

- সালেহ আহমদ তাকরীম
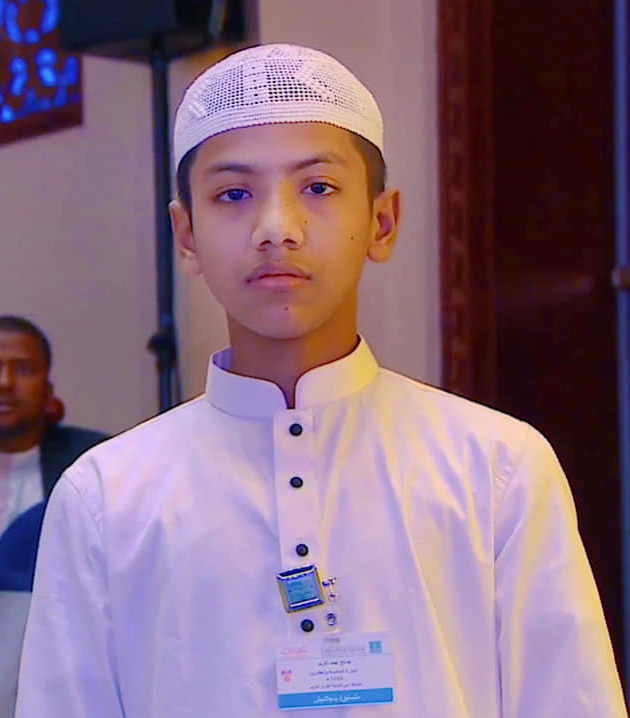
- Born: December 31, 2008 (age 17); Umarpur, Shailjana, Chauhali Upazila, Sirajganj District, Bangladesh
- Education: Markazu Faizil Quran Al Islami Dhaka
- Known for: International award winning Hafez of Quran
- Awards: 26th Dubai International Hifzul Qu'an wins first place 2023 (Dubai, 4 April 2023) 38th International Hefzul Qur'an Competition Winner (Iran, March 2022) 7th place in International Hefjul Quran Competition (Libya, May 2022)

Saleh Ahmad Takrim (born 31 December 2008) is a Bangladeshi hafez of the Quran. He won first place in the 38th Islamic Republic of Iran's International Holy Quran Competition in Tehran, Iran in 2022 at the age of 13. Also, in 2020, he won the Hafezul Quran Competition organized by Banglavision Television in the month of Ramadan. Takrim participated in the 42nd King Abdulaziz International Hafezul Quran Competition held in Mecca, Saudi Arabia in 2022, in which 153 Hafez from 111 countries participated. In the fourth category of the competition, Takrim won the third place and won a prize of 1 lakh riyals. Takrim won the first place in the 26th edition of the Dubai International Quran Competition in 2023.

== Early life ==
Saleh Ahmad Takrim was born on December 31, 2008, in Syed Bari of Umarpur, a village of Shailjana Union near the Jamuna River, in Chauhali Upazila, Sirajganj District. After the river broke down in Karalgras on Yamuna, he moved to Bhadra, a village in Tangail District. His father, Syed Abdur Rahman, teaches in a madrasah in Savar, and his mother is a housewife.

== Awards and honors ==
- First place among 30 thousand contestants in the 26th edition of the National Hifzul Quran Competition (Bangladesh, February 2022)
- King Abdul Aziz International Qur'an Competition won 3rd place in the 42nd edition (Saudi Arabia, September 2022)
- In 2022, Hafez was given state recognition for the first time by the Ministry of Religion and Islamic Foundation of the Bangladesh Government for his third place in Saudi Arabia.
- Dubai International Hefjul Qur'an Competition won first place in 2023 at the 26th edition (Dubai, 4 April 2023)
