= Libya International Holy Quran Competition =

International Quran competition at Libya

- Awarded for: Quran memorizing and reciting
- Sponsored by: Government of Libya; Ministry of Awqaf and Islamic Affairs Of Libya
- Date: 1991; 35 years ago
- Country: Libya
- Reward: 1st: 100,000 Libya Dinar 2nd: 80,000 Libya Dinar 3rd: 40,000 Libya Dinar

Libya International Holy Quran Memorizing and Reciting Competition is one of the biggest festive for Al-Quran reading, memorizing and reciting in all muslim world. About more than 50 country attending to this festive. This programme held by Libya’s Awqaf and Islamic Affairs ministry. The event hosts Quran recitation competitions in many ways. The contest aims to communicate and raise supreme and moral ethics in people. It also promoting the correct use of classical Arabic and encouraging children to study and recite the Qur’an. This programme was held in Al-Raied mosque, at city of Misurata.

== History ==
This competition was launched at 1991 AD. For the beginniners preparation, The country organize the national Quranic competition every year, Thats award called be National Unity Award. In 2018, There were 85 contestants country who participated in three categories. There are:

- Memorization of whole Quran
- Memorization of last half of the Quran
- Memorization of last quarter of the Quran.

== Purpose ==
The purpose of this award is to serve the Qur'an of Allah and to improve the general level of efficiency of the Qur'an through the following activities.

- To inspire the children generation towards their religion and realize their duty towards their Islamic beliefs and goals.
- Respecting significant memorizers of the Qur'anul Karim.
- Presenting one's country to the Muslim world in the service of Islam.

== Award ==
1st Prize: 100,000 LD (Libyan Dinar)

2nd Prize: 80,000 LD (Libyan Dinar)

3rd Prize: 40,000 LD (Libyan Dinar)

== See also ==
- Musabaqah Tilawatil Quran
- International Quran Recital Competition
- Dubai International Holy Quran Award
- Islamic Republic of Iran's International Holy Quran Competition
- Tijan an Nur International Quran Competition
