= International Quran Recital Competition =

Quran recital event held annually since 1961 in Malaysia

International Quran Recital Competition, Malaysia
- Status: Active
- Genre: Islamic Quran recital event
- Date: Annually
- Begins: 1961
- Frequency: Annual
- Venue: Putra World Trade Centre, Kuala Lumpur, Malaysia
- Locations: Kuala Lumpur, Malaysia
- Country: Malaysia
- Inaugurated: 1961
- Most recent: 2026
- Participants: Muslim Quran reciters from around the world
- Organiser: Ministry of Federal Territories

The International Quran Recital Competition, Malaysia is the international Islamic Quran recital event that is held annually since 1961 in Malaysia. It is the most popular international Quran competition all over the Muslim world. Sometimes it called internationally as Malaysia International Al-Quran Recitation and Memorisation Competition.

== History ==
Tunku Abdul Rahman (first Malaysian prime minister) was a founder of the International Quran Recital Competition. The program was started on 9 March 1961 at Stadium Merdeka, Kuala Lumpur and 7 countries took part in this competition including Singapore, Brunei, Thailand, Philippines, Indonesia, Sarawak and Malaya. In 1985, the competition was moved to the Putra World Trade Centre (PWTC).

== Winners ==
Year	Qari' (Men)	Qari'ah (Women)
1961	(Federation of Malaya) Ahmad Maasom Pergau	competition not created
1962	(Federation of Malaya) Mohd Yusof Abdullah	competition not created
1963	(Thailand) Manaf Sasaelos and (Malaysia) Ismail Hashim	competition not created
1964	(Malaysia) Hasan Musa	(Malaysia) Faridah Mat Saman
1965	(Malaysia) Ismail Hashim	(Malaysia) Faridah Mat Saman
1966	(Malaysia) Abd. Majid Awang	(Malaysia) Rogayah Sulong
1966^{[a]}	(Malaysia) Ismail Hashim	(Malaysia) Siti Noor Ismail
1967	(Malaysia) Abdul Ghani Abdullah	(Malaysia) Rodziah Abd. Rahman
1968	(Malaysia) Saidin Abd Rahman	(Malaysia) Rahmah Abd. Rahman
1969	(Malaysia) Ismail Hashim	(Thailand) Maimunah binti Moair Saad
1970	(Malaysia) Ismail Hashim	(Malaysia) Rodziah Abd. Rahman
1971	(Malaysia) Ismail Hashim	(Malaysia) Rodziah Abd. Rahman
1972	(Malaysia) Abdul Ghani Abdullah	(Malaysia) Faridah Mat Saman
1973	(Pahlavi Iran) Mohamad Taghi Morowat	(Malaysia) Rogayah Sulong
1974	(Malaysia) Ismail Hashim	(Malaysia) Rogayah Sulong
1975	(Malaysia) Ismail Hashim	(Malaysia) Nursiah Ismail
1976	(Indonesia) M. Ali Yusni	(Malaysia) Faridah Mat Saman
1977	(Brunei) Mashud Awang Damit	(Malaysia) Faridah Mat Saman
1978	(Thailand) Sofad Awang	(Malaysia) Rogayah Sulong
1979	(Iran) Abbas Salimi Naeini	(Indonesia) Sarini Abdullah
1980	(Malaysia) Abdul Ghani Abdullah	(Indonesia) Maria Ulfah
1981	(History of Libya under Muammar Gaddafi) Sheikh Al-Amin Mohamad Thoumi	(Malaysia) Sapinah Mamat
1982	(Malaysia) Abdul Ghani Abdullah	(Malaysia) Rahmas Abdullah
1983	(Indonesia) Mirwan Batubara	(Malaysia) Aminah Omar
1984	(History of Libya under Muammar Gaddafi) Mohamed Abu Snena	(Malaysia) Rahmas Abdullah
1985	(Malaysia) Noor Din Idris	(Malaysia) Rahmas Abdullah
1986	(Kuwait) Ahmed Al-Tarabulsi	(Indonesia) Rahmawati A. Rani
1987	(Iran) Ali Sayyah Gorji	(Malaysia) Sapinah Mamat
1988	(Indonesia) Syarifuddin M.	(Malaysia) Pasiah Hashim
1989	(Thailand) Brahang Harang	(Malaysia) Faridah Mat Saman
1990	(Iran) Abbas Emam Jameh	(Malaysia) Faridah Mat Saman
1991	(Malaysia) Mohamad Haji Yusof	(Malaysia) Faridah Mat Saman
1992	(Iran) Mansoor Ghazrizadeh	(Malaysia) Rahmas Abdullah
1993	(Iran) Ahmad Abu Al-Ghasimi	(Thailand) Fatimah Haji Madiah
1994	(Malaysia) Abdul Rahim Haji Ahmad	(Malaysia) Umi Kalthom Mohd Zain
1995	(Malaysia) Abdul Rahim Haji Ahmad	(Malaysia) Rahmas Abdullah
1996	(Egypt) Sheikh Mekkawi Mahmoud Mohamed	(Thailand) Sainab Abdulromae
1997	(Malaysia) Mohamad Hussin Mohamad Yunus	(Indonesia) Wildayati Nusril
1998	(Iran) Mohamad Gandom Najad Toosi	(Malaysia) Sepiah Mohamad
1999	(Malaysia) Che Yahaya Daud	(Malaysia) Maznah Awang
2000	(Malaysia) Radzi Kamarul Hailan	(Philippines) Isniarah Bantayao
2001	(Iran) Masoud Sayyah Gorji	(Malaysia) Pasiah Hashim
2002	(Indonesia) Bakri Waru	(Brunei) Aminah Haji Abd Manaf
2003	(Malaysia) Ahmad Faizul Ghazali	(Indonesia) Djihadiah Badar
2004	(Malaysia) Radzi Kamarul Hailan	(Indonesia) Nurhidayah Sulaiman
2005	(Indonesia) Indra Gunawan	(Malaysia) Faizah Mohd Husain
2006	(Iran) Hossein Saeid Rostami Tabrizy	(Thailand) Sainab Abdulromae
2007	(Malaysia) Aziz Mustakim	(Malaysia) Amnah Ayub
2008	(Indonesia) Mu'min Ainul Mubarak	(Thailand) Fatimah Ha'rati
2009	(Iraq) Usamah Abdullah	(Malaysia) Sharifah Khasif Fadzilah
2010	(Egypt) Sheikh Hani Abdel Aziz Ahmed	(Pakistan) Samia Khanan
2011	(Malaysia) Amirahman Abas	(Malaysia) Suraya Abu Hasan
2012	(Malaysia) Muhammad Anuar Ghazali	(Morocco) Hasnaa Khoulali
2013	(Indonesia) Dasrizal Marah Nainin	(Morocco) Hajar Boussaq
2014	(Malaysia) Ahmad Tarmizi Haji Ali	(Malaysia) Hanimzah Haji Jalaludin
2015	(Iran) Mohsen Haji Hassani Kargar	(Indonesia) Asrina Asril Buyong
2016	(Malaysia) Wan Ainuddin Hilmi Abdullah	(Malaysia) Nor Azrah Ayub
2017	(Iran) Hamed Alizadeh Marghzari	(Malaysia) Normalina Alias
2018	(Malaysia) Abdullah Fahmi bin Che Nor	(Malaysia) Suhailah Zulkifly
2019	(Malaysia) Abdul Khair Jalil	(Malaysia) Nor Farhatul Fairuzah Panut
2022	(Bahrain) Mohammed Sameer Mohammad Magahed	(Malaysia) Sofiza Mousin
2023	(Malaysia) Muhammad Qayyim Nizar Sarimi	(Morocco) Sara Belmamoun
2024	(Malaysia) Mohamad Husaini Mahmur	(Malaysia) Nor Hidayah Abdul Rahman
2025	(Malaysia) Aiman Ridhwan Mohammad Ramlan	(Malaysia) Wan Sofea Aini Wan Mohd Zahidi
2026	(Indonesia) Muhammad Fauji Ridwan	(Malaysia) Nur Syakura Mohamad Musa

== Notes ==
- ^{a} Held on 1386 Hijri.
- ^{b} Held on 1416 Hijri.

== See also ==
- Dubai International Holy Quran Award
- Islamic Republic of Iran's International Holy Quran Competition
- Muhammad VI Awards for the Holy Quran
- Tijan an Nur International Quran Competition
