= Iqro =

Textbook first published in the 1990s

Iqra
- Author: As'ad Humam and Team Tadarus AMM
- Original title: Buku Iqro': Cara Cepat Belajar Membaca Al-Qur’an
- Language: Indonesian, Arabic
- Genre: textbook, Quran reading
- Publication date: early 1990s (first edition)
- Publication place: Indonesia

Iqro (Arabic: اقرأ, romanized: iqraʾ, lit. 'Read!'; full title: Buku Iqro': Cara Cepat Belajar Membaca Al-Qur’an, "Iqro Book: A Fast Way to Learn to Read the Quran") is a textbook used in Indonesia and Malaysia for learning Arabic letters and pronunciation. It was originally published in the early 1990s, authored by As'ad Humam and a team known as "Team Tadarus AMM" in Yogyakarta. Iqro is a stepping-stone for reading the Quran in its original Arabic, given that these countries do not use Arabic outside religious contexts.

The book was offered as an alternative to the older "Traditional" or "Baghdadi" method, and emphasizes the student's active role in learning. It is divided into six volumes (often sold as one physical book), each introducing Arabic letter shapes and sounds with increasing difficulty. The higher volumes also introduced elementary tajwid rules, or pronunciation rules for reciting the Quran.

== Background ==
Indonesia has a majority Muslim population, but the population is not Arabic-speaking and the Arabic letters are not usually used except in religious contexts. Therefore, to read the Quran in the original Arabic, Indonesian Muslims must learn Arabic letters and the pronunciations. Some Arabic phonemes (such as /θ/ for ث) do not appear in Indonesian languages and take training to pronounce correctly. In addition, students must also learn a special set pronunciation rules for Quranic recitation known as the tajwid.

Prior to the popularity of Iqro, many taught Quranic reading using a method known as the "traditional" or "Baghdadi" method, which is still used today although to lesser extent. This method uses a textbook called Qa'ida Baghdadiyya ma' Juz Amma, and uses a technique to spell out each letter and vowel markings in local languages before pronouncing a complete word (e.g. "nun given a mark on top: 'na'"). This method also emphasizes teacher-student relationship at a personal level.

== Content ==
A page from the second volume of the book (called "Iqro 2"). The new lessons in this page—how certain Arabic letters are written in non-isolated forms—are introduced on top. The rest of the page allows practice with this new lesson, as well as the previous lessons such as letters in isolation.

The Iqro book consists of six volumes, sometimes sold separately in different colors and sometimes bound together as one physical book. Each volume began with a teaching instruction. Pages in the book often contain notations on the top introducing a new lesson (e.g. how a particular Arabic consonant assimilates). Instructions in the Indonesian language with the voice of an instruction (e.g. "Be careful!", "Go slow here!") often punctuate the content. Compared to the traditional method with emphasizes teacher-student relationship, the Iqro method was designed to allow for more independent learning. Teachers are expected to give only minimum instruction and then passively listen to the students' recitation.

The six volumes are in increasing level of difficulty. Volume one introduces each letter in the Arabic alphabet in its isolated form and fathah (-a) vowel. The second volume introduces the non-isolated forms (initial, medial, and final) still in fathah. The third volume introduces the kasrah (-i) and dammah (-u) vowels. Volume four introduces tanwin (nunation), sukun (non-vocalized consonant) and qalqalah (consonants with reduced vowel). Volume five introduces various forms of alif lam (Arabic definite article) as well as the tajwid rule (Quranic recitation rule) of idgham (merging). The last volume—the sixth—introduces the tajwid rules of iqlab (conversion) and ikhfa' (concealment), as well as the waqf (pausing rules).

== Development ==
The Iqro method was originated by As'ad Humam (1933–1996), a kyai and merchant from Yogyakarta and developed by a team calling themselves Team Tadarus AMM, also in Yogyakarta. The book was first published in the early 1990s, but according to Team Tadarus AMM, the history began earlier. In 1953, a Quranic teaching group was established using a traditional teaching method called the Baghdadi method. In 1973, As'ad Humam began discussions at his home on challenges faced in teaching the reading of Quran. Team Tadarus AMM was then established and subsequently developed reports on teaching conditions. Among others, the team reported that the current teaching methodologies were not sufficient.

The team then experimented with new teaching methodologies, and developed a new system, which spread to other cities in Java. In 1988, the team received recognition from the provincial Department of Religious Affairs bureau. By 1992, the Iqro books were sold throughout the country. The proliferation of the books were combined with the establishment of a schooling system known as Taman Pendidikan Al-Quran ("Quranic kindergartens", TPA). The TPAs were initially organized in local mosques sponsored by local initiators. Eventually, the local schools came under the umbrella of a semi-official confederation known as the "Organizing Body for the Youth Groups of Indonesian Mosques" (Indonesian acronym: BKPRMI). The BKPRMI trained TPA teachers on the Iqro method and materials.

The Iqro method spread rapidly and became very popular throughout Indonesia. The success was generally attributed to its students being able to learn faster than students using the traditional methods.

At the same time, the Iqro method also spread to the neighboring Malaysia, and in 1994 the Malaysian government adopted it as an official method for teaching Quranic recitation in elementary schools. The Malaysian version of the book has slight variations from the original, for example, instructions in local language are given in Jawi script—a common practice in Malaysia for Islamic education books—rather than the Latin alphabet.

== Uses ==
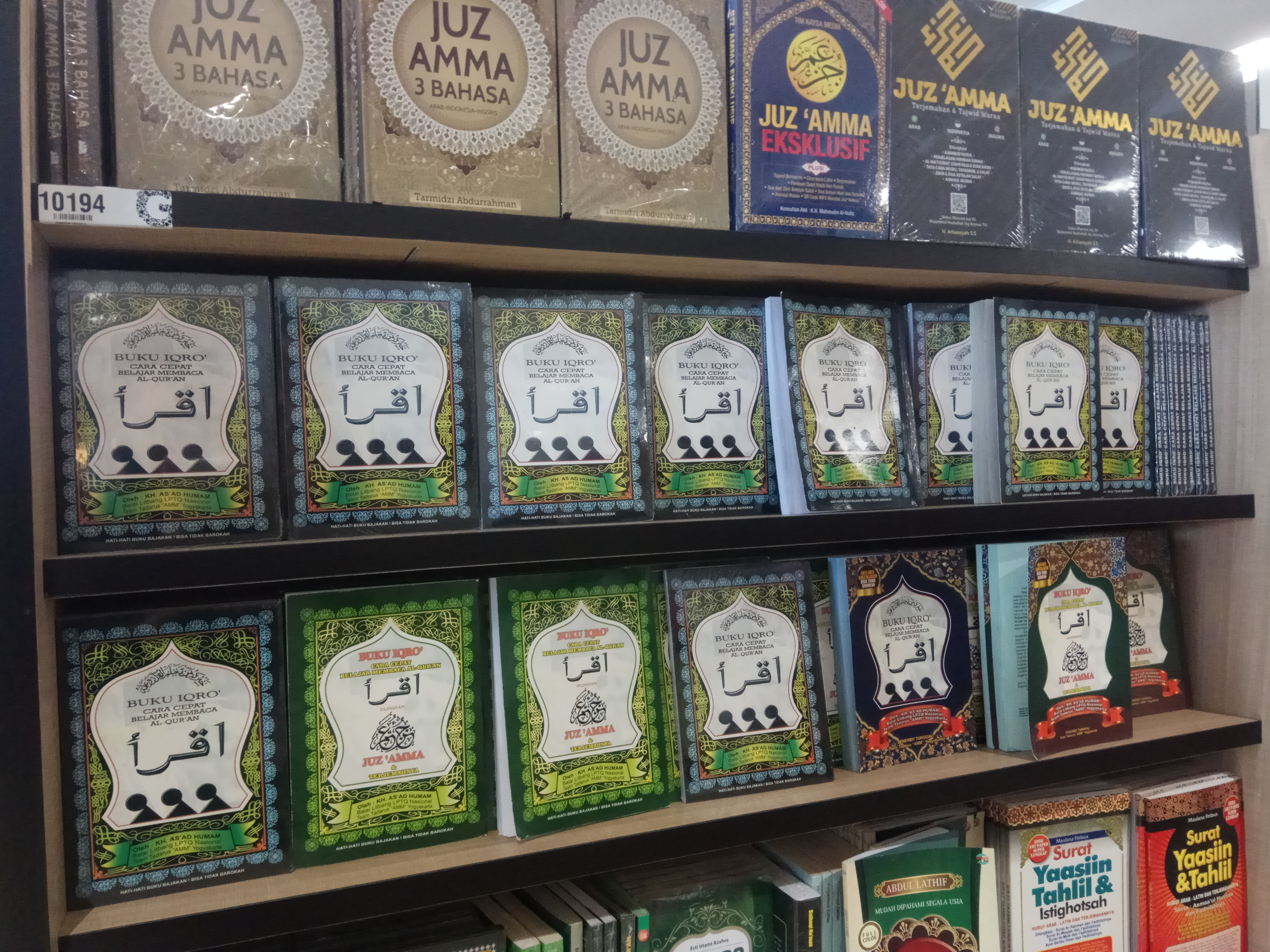
Shelf of copies of Iqro in a bookstore in Padang, Indonesia. Iqro is one of the most popular textbooks for learning to read the Quran in Indonesia.

Iqro is one of the most popular textbooks for learning to read the Quran in Indonesia as well as other countries in Southeast Asia. Iqro is usually learned by kindergarten to early elementary school children, and often used in the designated recitational schools, seminaries such as pesantren or surau, or homeschooling for religious education. Recitation skill learned through Iqro is a competition material in the Quranic recitational contest Musabaqah Tilawatil Quran (MTQ).
