= List of religion-related awards =

This list of religion-related awards is an index to articles about notable awards related to religion given by institutions other than the churches. Awards by churches are covered by the list of ecclesiastical decorations.

Country	Award	Sponsor	Given for
United States	American Music Award for Favorite Contemporary Inspirational Artist	American Music Awards	Favorite Artist – Contemporary Inspirational
Germany	Buber-Rosenzweig-Medal	Deutscher Koordinierungsrat der Gesellschaften für Christlich-Jüdische Zusammenarbeit	Individuals, initiatives, or institutions, which have actively contributed to Christian–Jewish understanding
United Kingdom	Burkitt Medal	British Academy	Special service to biblical studies
Canada	Covenant Awards	GMA Canada	Christian music industry
United Arab Emirates	Dubai International Holy Quran Award	Government of Dubai	For memorization of the Quran
United States	Four Freedoms Award	Roosevelt Institute	Commitment to those principles which US President Franklin Delano Roosevelt proclaimed in his historic speech to United States Congress on January 6, 1941, as essential to democracy: freedom of speech and expression, freedom of worship, freedom from want, freedom from fear
United States	GMA Dove Award	Gospel Music Association	Outstanding achievement in the Christian music industry
United Arab Emirates	Global Islamic Finance Awards	Edbiz Corporation	Islamic banking and finance
United States	Grammy Award for Best Contemporary Christian Music Song	The Recording Academy	Quality contemporary Christian music songs
United States	Grawemeyer Award	University of Louisville	Ideas rather than lifelong or publicized personal achievement
Norway	Holberg Prize	Government of Norway	Outstanding scholars for work in the arts, humanities, social sciences, law and theology
United States	Humanist of the Year	American Humanist Association	Humanism
Saudi Arabia	King Faisal International Prize	King Faisal Foundation	Islamic studies
Europe	Leipzig Human Rights Award	European-American Citizens Committee for Human Rights and Religious Freedom in the USA	Efforts towards human rights and freedom of expression in the USA
Switzerland	Mount Zion Award	University of Lucerne	Significant contribution to the Jewish-Christian dialogue or to the understanding of the three Abrahamic religions, Judaism, Christianity and Islam, in Israel
United Kingdom	Order of the Founder	The Salvation Army	Salvationists who had rendered distinguished service, such as would have specially commended itself to the Founder
United States	Patronal Medal	Catholic University of America	Distinguished service in the advancement of Marian devotion, theology, or general appreciation of the place of Mary in the life of the Catholic Church
United States	Richard Dawkins Award	Atheist Alliance International	Distinguished individual from the worlds of science, scholarship, education or entertainment, who publicly proclaims the values of secularism and rationalism, upholding scientific truth wherever it may lead
United Kingdom	Secularist of the Year	National Secular Society	Individual or organisation considered to have made the greatest contribution to secularism in the previous year
United States	Stellar Awards	Stellar Awards Gospel Music Academy	Achievements in the gospel music industry
United States	Templeton Prize	John Templeton Foundation	Person who has made an exceptional contribution to affirming life's spiritual dimension, whether through insight, discovery, or practical works
United States	The Rabbi Martin Katzenstein Award	Harvard Divinity School	Graduate who exhibits a passionate and helpful interest in the lives of other people, an informed and realistic faithfulness, an embodiment of the idea that love is not so much a way of feeling as a way of acting, and a reliable sense of humor
Malaysia	The Royal Award For Islamic Finance	Malaysia International Islamic Financial Centre (MIFC)	Contributions towards Islamic banking and finance.

== See also ==
- Lists of awards
- List of ecclesiastical decorations
- List of awards for contributions to culture
