= Mu'min Ainul Mubarak =

Indonesian Quran reciter

- Born: February 10, 1971 (age 55); Tasikmalaya, West Java, Indonesia
- Occupation: Quran reciter
- Known for: International reciter of the Holy Qur'an
- Title: Haji, Ustad, Hafiz

Mu'min Ainul Mubarak (Arabic: مؤمن عين المبارك; born 10 February 1971) is an Indonesian reciter of Quran and Hafiz from Tasikmalaya.

== Life ==
He was ranked as an "International Qari" when he outperformed rivals from different countries in the International Quran Recital Competition in Malaysia in the year of 2008 and in the International Holy Quran Competition in Iran in the year of 2009.

He established an Islamic Boarding School known as "Pesantren" in his hometown Tasikmalaya called "Ma'had Murattal ul Qur'an Mu'min 'Ainul Mubarok" (Arabic: معهد مرتل القرآن مؤمن عين المبارك) in 2010 to build future professional reciters from a young age.

== Travels overseas ==
He was the champion of the 2008 International Quran Recital Competition in Malaysia and 2009 International Holy Quran Competition in Iran. In 2009, he was invited to Pakistan to recite in the International Mehfil Husn-e-Qirat Jamia Binoria and other events in the country including reciting in the Faisal Mosque of Islamabad, Pakistan in February 2009. He also participated in the 9th Annual Hifz, Naazira & Qira'atul Quran competition which was held by the Islamic Foundation of Toronto, Canada and was given the Guest Award in 2014.

== See also ==
- Maria Ulfah – Indonesian Quran reciter (born 1955)
- Muammar Z.A. – Indonesian Quran reciter
