= Muammar Z.A. =

Indonesian Quran reciter

H. Muammar Z.A
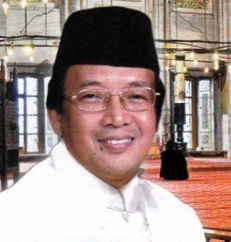
- Born: Muammar Zainal Asyikin; June 14, 1954 (age 72); Pemalang, Central Java, Indonesia
- Occupation: Qari
- Known for: Legendary reciter of the Quran in Indonesia
- Title: Kyai Haji, Ustad, Hafiz
- Spouse: Syarifah Nadiya
- Children: Lia Farah Diza, Ahmad Syauqi Al Banna, Husnul Adib Al Fasyi, Rayhan Al Bazzy, and Ammar Luaiyan Ad Daany.
- Parent(s): H. Zainal Asyikin and Hj. Mu’minatul Afifah
- Relatives: Imron Rosyadi Z.A.

Qari Muammar Zainal Asyikin (Arabic: معمر زين العاشقين, Mu'ammar Zayn-al Ashqeen; born 14 June 1954) sometimes shortened Muammar ZA or Muammar Za is a senior Qari or Quran reciter and Hafiz from Indonesia. He won Qur'an Recitation Contests known as "Musabaqah Tilawatil Quran" ("MTQ") during the 1980s in Indonesia and abroad. His talent was recognised during childhood in his hometown Pemalang where he participated and won a local children's Quran Competition in 1962 when he was just 7 years of age

In 1967 he achieved the first place in the Quran Reciting Competition ("MTQ") of Jogjakarta Province, and after that winning in 1972 and 1973 representing Jogjakarta province in the national level of Quran Reciting Competition in Indonesia. In 1979 and 1986 he won the International level Quran Reciting Competition, and because of his achievements, he was invited to recite in Istana Nurul Iman of Brunei, National Palace of Malaysia, and until the Middle East.

He was invited by Jamia Binoria to recite the Quran in Pakistan in 2009. He was also invited to recite in Turkey (IGMG Aileler Günü) in 2004.

== Background ==
Qari Muammar is the seventh child of ten, of which only nine lived to adulthood, of H. Zainal Asykin and Hj. Mu’minatul Afifah who were religious figures of their home village. Qari Muammar was born in Moga district which is approximately 40 km south from the capital city of Pemalang Regency in Central Java. He has a younger brother named Imron Rosyadi Z.A who has followed in his brother's footsteps to become a Qari. Muammar married a woman from Aceh named Syarifah Nadiya in 1984 and has a daughter and four sons.

In 2002, Muammar established an Islamic Boarding School or "Pesantren" called "Pesantren Ummul Qura" (Arabic: أم القرى) located in Cipondoh, Tangerang to build future professional Qaris from a young age.

== See also ==
- Maria Ulfah
- Mu'min Ainul Mubarak
