= Anne Rasmussen (educator) =

American musicologist and ethnomusicologist

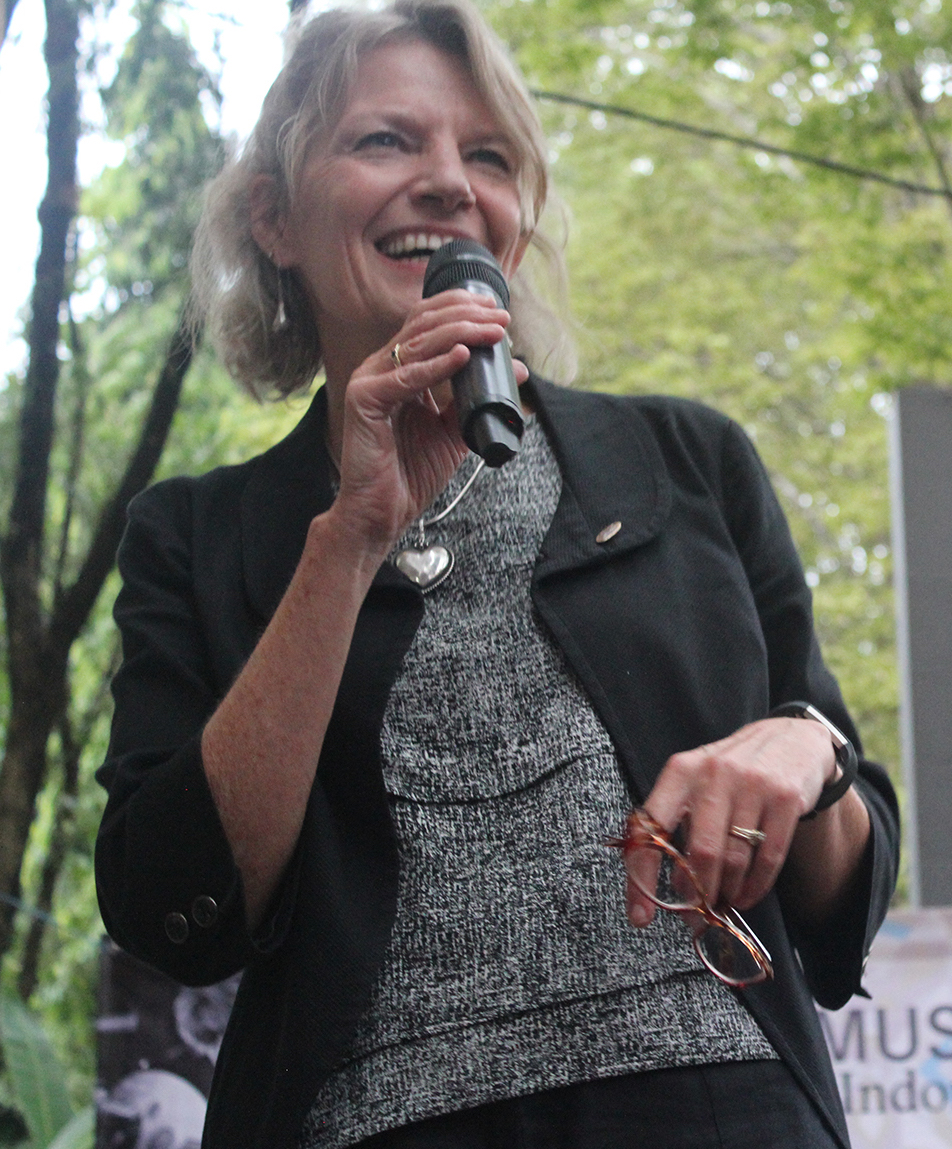
Anne Rasmussen

Anne K. Rasmussen (born 1959) is an American educator and ethnomusicologist. Rasmussen is Professor of Ethnomusicology and Bickers Professor of Middle Eastern Studies at William & Mary where she also directs the William & Mary Middle Eastern Music Ensemble (Est 1994). She has repeatedly been recognized for faculty excellence and is known for the interdisciplinary, experiential learning programs she has designed for students in Oman and Morocco, as well as for her semester-long program "Washington and the Arts" taught on various occasions at William & Mary's Washington Campus, as well as for the international cohort of musicians and scholars with whom she regularly collaborates.

== Education and Research ==
Rasmussen received her B.A. from Northwestern University, her M.A. from the University of Denver, and her Ph.D. in ethnomusicology from the University of California, Los Angeles. During her graduate training Rasmussen studied with A. J. Racy, Timothy Rice, Nazir Jairazbhoy, and began focussed studies of Arab music performance with Scott Marcus. Her studies at the New England Conservatory and the University of the Sorbonne in Paris were significant and influential on her career path. Her first ethnographic and historical research on music and community in Arab America led to a career-long investment in the studying, teaching, performing, programming, and advocating for the music of a broadly Multicultural America. Her subsequent research and award-winning publications encompass music of the Middle East and Muslim worlds, with a focus on Indonesia and the Indian Ocean region, and music in a multicultural United States, with a focus on Arab America.

== Career ==
Anne K. Rasmussen has authored and co-edited five books and written articles appearing in many journals, including Ethnomusicology, Asian Music, Popular Music, American Music, The World of Music, The Garland Encyclopaedia of World Music, and the Harvard Dictionary of Music. She produced four CD recordings documenting immigrant and community music in the United States. She is the recipient of two Fulbright Fellowships for research in Indonesia, a Sultan Qaboos Cultural Center Fellowship for research in Oman, and a fellowship from the American Council of Learned Societies (ACLS), and a grant from the French Centre National de Recherche Scientifique, she has also served as President of the Society for Ethnomusicology.

Rasmussen has been teaching courses in ethnomusicology at The College of William & Mary since 1993, where she also directs with Middle Eastern Music Ensemble, founded in 1994.

Rasmussen has hosted numerous artists and scholars on tour in the US and at her home institution, the College of William & Mary. She accompanied Indonesian Qur'an reciter Maria Ulfah, a primary collaborator in Indonesia, during Ulfa's 1999 tour of the United States under the auspices of the Middle East Studies Association of North America, and again in 2016 with the sponsorship of the Embassy of Indonesia and the Smithsonian Institution In 2010 and 2011, she was hosted by the government of Oman and the Sultan Qaboos Cultural Center for her musicology research there. She continues ties to the Sultanate of Oman and has co-directed numerous student study-abroad tours to the country. Since 1994, the Middle Eastern Music Ensemble that she directs at William & Mary has hosted visiting guest artists and scholars from the Arab World, the Middle East Region and Asia on a regular basis.

== Awards ==
In addition to the research fellowships she has earned, Rasmussen has won prestigious awards for her scholarship. In 2002, Rasmussen won the Jaap Kunst Prize for her work "The Qur'an in Indonesian Daily Life: The Public Project of Musical Oratory" from the Society for Ethnomusicology. This award is given to the best article published annually in the field of ethnomusicology. The purpose of this prize is "[t]o recognize the most significant article in ethnomusicology written by a member of the Society for Ethnomusicology and published within the previous year (whether in the journal Ethnomusicology or in another journal or edited collection)." In 2011, her book Women, the Recited Qur'an, and Islamic Music in Indonesia received the Alan Merriam Prize Honorable Mention. She received the Phi Beta Kappa Award for Excellence in Teaching and served a term as Vice President (the highest presiding officer) of Phi Beta Kappa, Alpha chapter of Virginia. Rasmussen has served The Society for Ethnomusicology (SEM) in many ways including as SEM President (2015–2017). She has served on the SEM council and the SEM Board many times over the course of her career. Rasmussen is also active in the Middle East Studies Association (MESA) and the Association for Asian Studies (AAS).

== Bibliography (Books) ==
- Women, the Recited Qur'an, and Islamic Music in Indonesia (Berkeley : University of California Press, 2010).
- Divine Inspirations: Music and Islam in Indonesia (Co-editor with David Harnish and contributing author; Oxford University Press, 2011 ).
- The Music of Multicultural America: Performance, Identity and Community in the U. S. A. (Co-editor with Kip Lornell and contributing author; University Press of Mississippi, 2nd revised and expanded edition, 2016).
- Merayakan Islam dengan Irama: Perempuan, Seni Tilawa, dan Musik Islam di Indonesia. Indonesian Translation (Bahasa Indonesia) of Women, the Recited Qur'an, and Islamic Music in Indonesia (Mizan/Banteng Press, Bandung & Yogyakarta, Indonesia, 2019).
- Music in Arabia: Perspectives on Heritage, Mobility, and Nation (Co-editor with Issa Boulos and Virginia Danielson and contributing author; Indiana University Press, 2021).
