= Muhammad Dahlan (Indonesian minister) =

Indonesian politician

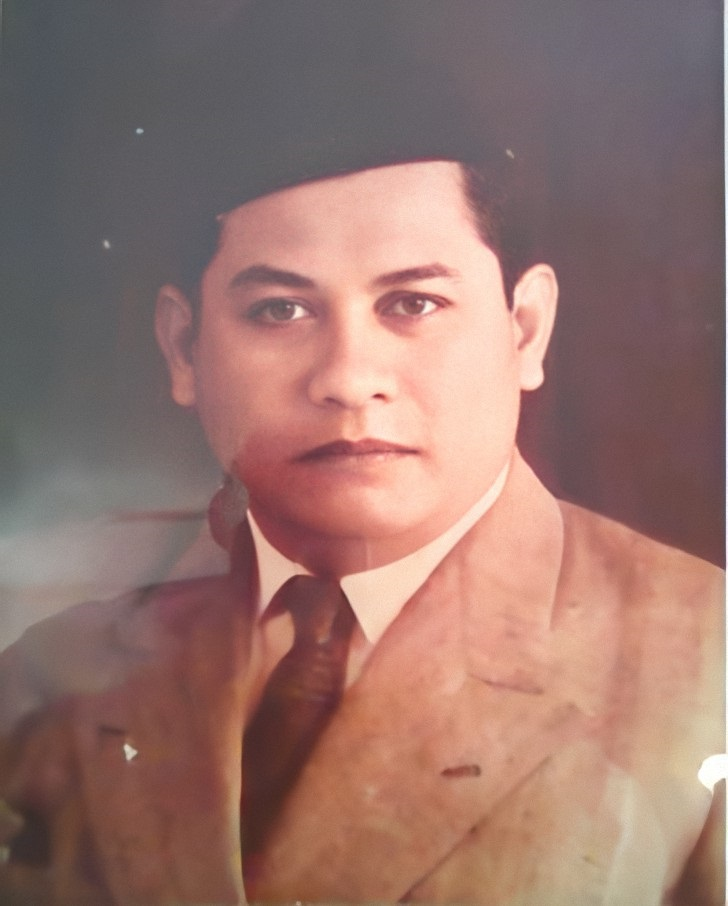
- Muhammad Dahlan as the Minister of Religious Affairs

10th Indonesian Minister of Religious Affairs
- In office 17 October 1967 – 28 March 1973
- President: Suharto
- Preceded by: KH. Saifuddin Zuhri
- Succeeded by: Prof.Dr.H.A. Mukti Ali

Personal details
- Born: June 2, 1909 Pasuruan, East Java, Dutch East Indies
- Died: February 1, 1977 (aged 67) Indonesia
- Party: Nahdlatul Ulama

KH. Muhammad Dahlan (2 June 1909 – 1 February 1977) was an Indonesian politician. He served as the Minister of Religious Affairs from 1967 to 1973.

== Early life ==
He was born on June 2, 1909, in the village of Mandaran, Rejo, Pasuruan, East Java, Dutch East Indies. The third son of five children, his father was Dahlan Abdul Hamid and his mother was Chamsiyah. Dahlan's village is located on the coast, approximately three kilometers from the town of Pasuruan. Together with his eldest brother, he followed the teachings around the courtyard of Masjid Al-Harram Mecca. There he studied various religious sciences, and learnt about the wider world, which was later useful for his political career, especially when doing business with the Nahdlatul Ulama.

== Career ==
Dahlan's appearance in the arena movement began in 1930. He pioneered the establishment of NU Bangil branch and become its chairman. Five years later he was elected chairman of the NU branch of Pasuruan.

In government, he served as Minister of Religious Development in the First Development Cabinet (1967-1971), in which he pioneered interfaith discussion on 30 November 1967. Dahlan led the meeting and put forward the plan for approval, to be carried out to deepen the understanding and practice of their respective religions..

KH. Ibrahim Hosen initiated the Musabaqah Tilawatil Qur'an (MTQ) national level for the first time held in Ujung Pandang. In addition, with KH. Zaini Miftah, KH. Ali Masyhar and Prof. DR. HA Mukti Ali on January 23, 1970, form Ulumuddin Ihya Foundation, he pioneered the establishment of the College of the Quran (PTIQ), a college that specializes in teaching the art of reading and memorizing the Quran.

In the field of science, Dahlan was prominent in fiqh disciplines. Dahlan caused moderation in view of the divergence among the Shafi'i imam.

Dahlan's decision to leave Pasuruan to move to Jakarta was influenced by reading the Dalail Khairat after Fajr until the Duha prayer before or after Maghrib until Isha prayers.

He died on February 1, 1997. His body was buried in the Heroes' Cemetery Kalibata, as a form of government recognition of his services to build Indonesia.
