= Mukti Ali =

Indonesian politician

11th Indonesian Minister of Religious Affairs
- In office 28 March 1973 – 29 March 1978
- President: Suharto
- Preceded by: K.H. Muhammad Dahlan
- Succeeded by: Alamsyah Ratu Perwiranegara

Personal details
- Born: 23 August 1923 Cepu, Blora, Central Java, Dutch East Indies
- Died: 5 May 2004 (aged 80) Yogyakarta, Indonesia

Abdul Mukti Ali (born in Cepu, Blora, Central Java, Dutch East Indies, 23 August 1923 – died in Yogyakarta, Indonesia, 5 May 2004 at the age of 80 years) was a Minister of Religious Affairs of the Republic of Indonesia in the Second Development Cabinet.
