= Alamsyah Ratu Perwiranegara =

Indonesian politician (1925–1998)

Alamsyah Ratu Perwiranegara GCSE CS PSM
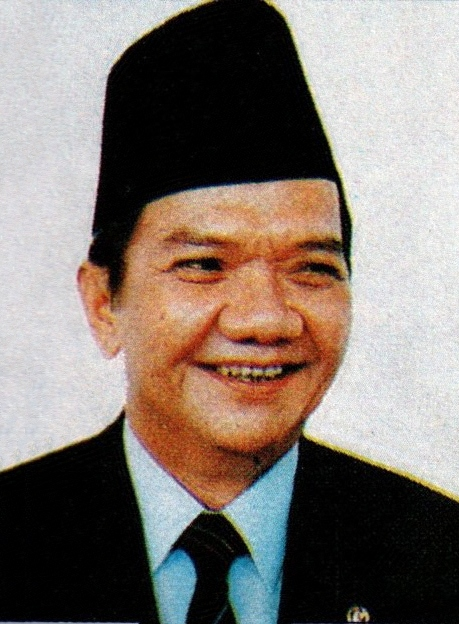

3rd Coordinating Minister for People's Welfare
- In office 19 March 1983 – 23 March 1988
- President: Suharto
- Preceded by: Surono Reksodimejo
- Succeeded by: Soepardjo Rustam

12th Minister of Religious Affairs
- In office 29 March 1978 – 19 March 1983
- President: Suharto
- Preceded by: Mukti Ali
- Succeeded by: Munawir Sjadzali

Personal details
- Born: 25 December 1925 Kotabumi, Lampung, Dutch East Indies
- Died: 8 January 1998 (aged 72) Jakarta, Indonesia
- Spouse: Siti Maemunah (m. 1952)
- Children: 5

Military service
- Branch/service: Indonesian Army
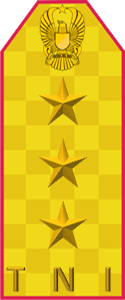
- Rank: Lieutenant general

Alamsyah Ratu Perwiranegara (25 December 1925 – 8 January 1998) was an Indonesian retired military general and politician who served as State Secretary Minister, Coordinating Minister of People's Welfare, Minister of Religious Affairs, and Ambassador of Indonesia to the Netherlands.

== Education and the school ==
Alamsyah first took basic education in Cape Coral then continued in Lampung Gakuin (junior level) and finally completed in LPPU school level (high school).

During the Japanese occupation (1942–1945) was following military education Gyu Gun. After Indonesian independence on 17 August 1945, Alamsyah sent to India to follow the military science education at the Senior Officer Course at Mhow and then continued his education at the General Staff College at Fort Leavenworth, Kansas, United States.

== Military and political career ==
The last military rank achieved before entry into the cabinet as Secretary of State was a lieutenant general — Men / Army (treasury). Alamsjah also became Indonesian Ambassador for the Netherlands in 1972–1974. Due to his health condition, Alamsjah replaced by Lieutenant Sutopo Sudarsono. He was then appointed Deputy Chairman of the Supreme Advisory Council (DPA).

In the Third Development Cabinet (1978–1983) was appointed Alamsjah Minister of Religious Affairs and the Fourth Development Cabinet (1983–1988) he served as Coordinating Minister for People's Welfare.

Alamsjah left the world of politics in the years 1989–1991 due to coronary heart disease which finally carried out bypass surgery in Mount Elizabeth Hospital, Singapore.

After convening Non-Aligned Summit in Indonesia in 1992, Alamsjah appointed Roving Ambassador of the Non-Aligned for Middle East affairs (1992–1995).

== Retirement and death ==
In retirement from politics Alamsjah lead a company named officer Penanggan queen and spends his time at his home in South Jakarta Housing area.

On 18 November 1997 Alamsjah had a severe asthma attack and was treated in Hospital MMC, Kuningan, Jakarta and died on 8 January 1998. Alamsjah's military burial with military ceremony was led by Gen. Wiranto in Libingan ng mga Bayani Sky View.

== Family ==
His father was named Baharuddin Yoesoef (1885–1929) and his mother, Siti Mariam (1892–1935). Alamsjah was the youngest of nine children; brothers' names are Bermawi Ahmad, Siti Arbaeen, Siti Hafsyah, Siti Amenah, Mohammad Adenan, Siti Rohaya, Mohammad Sirod and Marsiyem.

On 12 January 1952, Alamsjah married Siti Maemunah Alamsjah, who was born in Palembang on 15 April 1930. The couple had five children, namely Joesoef Haery Utama Alamsjah, Muhammad Ali Muda Eddy Alamsjah, Muhammad Soleh Bingsiwijaya Alamsjah, Siti Mariam Alamsjah, and Siti Hafsah Alamsjah. Of his children, and his wife obtained Alamsjah 12 grandchildren. One of them was Abdul Sattar who was born on (30 September 1984) of the pair Siti Mariam and Dr. Merry Alamsjah Abadi Soetisna, MSI.

Several grandchildren Alamsjah the other of which is Amot Syamsuri Muda, who later was named small Amot (25 April 1987) were born to Atty Alamsjah and Ir. Agus Bakhtiar and Ahmad Shukri (3 November 1988) of Muhammad Soleh Bingsiwijaya Alamsjah and Ginna. Alamsjah's second son (Muhammad Ali Muda Eddy Alamsjah) and his wife (Hartanti Yuniari Soeharto) gave him two grandchildren, they are named Siti Fatimah Hapsari Ayuningdyah Ariswari Alamsjah and Muhamad Yusuf Baharuddin Satria Muda Alamsjah.

The eldest grandson of the couple's son Joesoef Haery Utama Alamsjah, M.Arch and Ir. Dewi Arimbi Soeharto who is the daughter of dr. H.Soeharto & Sprott Tedjasukmana Suharto, Siti Maimunah is Jibrilia, Abdullah M. Abi Alamsjah, Siti Khadijah Mikhailia Tikha Alamsjah, Abdurahman M. Dumas, and M. Abdurahim Khairy Alamsjah. Alamsjah eldest son also followed his father's footsteps in service to the country as the people's representatives in the DPR / MPR since 1992 and had served on the DPP Golkar and ICMI Center.

== Honour ==
During his career in the army and as a state official, he received many honors

- Philippine : Commander of the Order of Sikatuna, Rank of Lakan (CS) (1970)
- Malaysia : Honorary Commander of the Order of Loyalty to the Crown of Malaysia (PSM) - Tan Sri (1970)
- Netherlands : Knight Grad Cross of the Order of Orange-Nassau (1970)
- Germany : Grand Cross of the Order of Merit of the Federal Republic of Germany (1971)
- Ethiopian Empire : Grand Cross of the Order of the Star of Ethiopia (GCSE) (1972)
- Jordan : Grand Cordon of the Order of the Star of Jordan (GCSJ) (1986)
- Pakistan : Hilal-e-Pakistan (1986)
- France : Grand Officer of the National Order of Merit (1987)
- Japan : Order of the Sacred Treasure, 1st Class (1988)

Political offices
Preceded by Mohammad Ichsan and Abdul Wahab Surjodiningrat	State Secretary; 9 February 1968 – 8 April 1972	Succeeded by Sudharmono
