= Royal Award for Islamic Finance =

International award on Islamic finance

The Royal Award for Islamic Finance (RAIF)
- Awarded for: Outstanding contributions towards the advancement of Islamic finance globally
- Country: Malaysia
- First award: October 2010
- Website: http://www.theroyalaward.com

The Royal Award for Islamic Finance (RAIF) is an international award given to an individual who has excelled in advancing Islamic finance. It was established in 2010 under the Malaysia International Islamic Financial Centre (MIFC) initiative and supported by Bank Negara Malaysia and Securities Commission Malaysia.

== See also ==
- List of economics awards
- Muhammad VI Awards for the Holy Quran
