= Tijan an Nur International Quran Competition =

International Quran competition at Qatar

Tijan an-Nur International Quran Competition
- Awarded for: Quran memorizing and reciting
- Sponsored by: Jeem Television Government of Qatar Ministry of Awqaf and Islamic Affairs
- Date: 2013; 13 years ago
- Country: Qatar
- Reward: 1st: 500,000 Qatari riyal 2nd: 300,000 Qatari riyal 3rd: 100,000 Qatari riyal
- Website: www.jcc-quran-competition.tv

Qatar Tijan an Nur International Quran Competition and Award is an International Quranic competition and award organized by Jeem Television (Al Jazeera Children's Channel) in Qatar. Children aged only 9-13 can participate in this program. The competition has attracted participants from different countries, turning it into one of the most important Quran recitation competitions in the world. The event hosts Quran recitation competitions in various ways. The contest aims to communicate and instill supreme and moral values in children, while promoting the correct use of classical Arabic and encouraging children to study and recite the Quran. A committee consisting of eminent scholars, and scholars specializing in the study and recitation of the Quran will evaluate the readers based on the rules of vowels, the quality of words and performance and the type of recitation.

In this competition, First place winner get 500,000 Qatari riyal, the second place and third-place winners get 300,000 Qatari riyal and 100,000 Qatari riyal respectively.

== History ==
In 2013, more than 1,300 children from 54 countries applied to participate in the event. 13 year old Doha from Morocco was winner in this session.

In 2022, Quran memorizers from 48 countries were attracted, while 16 Arab countries participated with 681 reciters. And Ministry of Awqaf and Islamic Affairs will sponsor in this 2022 edition for Quran Recitation.

== Purpose ==
The purpose of this award is to serve the Quran of Allah and to improve the general level of efficiency of the Qur'an through the following activities.

- To inspire the children generation towards their religion and realize their duty towards their Islamic beliefs and goals.
- Respecting significant memorizers of the Quran.
- Presenting one's country to the Muslim world in the service of Islam.

== See More ==
- Dubai International Holy Quran Award
- Muhammad VI Awards for the Holy Quran
- Islamic Republic of Iran's International Holy Quran Competition
