= Maria Ulfah =

Indonesian Quran reciter (born 1955)

- ماريا أولفا
- Born: December 21, 1955 (age 70); Lamongan, East Java, Indonesia
- Known for: Qāriʾah (female reciter of the Quran)
- Musical career
- Instrument: Vocal
- Labels: GP Records; HP Music; HP Records; Musica Studio's

Maria Ulfah (Arabic: ماريا أولفا; born 21 December 1955) is an Indonesian qāriʾah (reciter of the Quran) and manager of the Central Institute for the Development of Quranic Recitation. She is the winner of two Indonesian national Qur'an recitation contests and is internationally recognized as one of the world's master reciters and teachers of recitation. She is also a lecturer at the Institute for the Study of Qur'an and at the National Islamic University in Indonesia, as well as the first woman to win an international Qur'an recitation award in Malaysia in 1980. She's considered an internationally significant figure in the field, and has been referred to as Southeast Asia's premier female reciter of the Qur'an.

== Personal life ==
Ulfah was born in Lamongan Regency, East Java, on December 21, 1955, to Haji Mudhoffar and Hajjah Ruminah. She was the ninth child of twelve. In 1981, she married Mukhtar Ikhsan, a pulmonologist and respiratory physician and lecturer at the medical school of the University of Indonesia. She has three children: Ahmad Nabries, Mohammad Labib, and Rifky Mubarak.

== Career ==
Ulfah was introduced to Qur'an recitation by her father, Haji Mudhoffar, who taught her that she was equal to any man or woman. He staged Qur'an reciting competitions in their hometown to give his daughter experience. She began training at age 6, with instruction from her older sister. Her interest in the art grew as she attended an Islamic boarding school that encouraged her to pursue recitation. Since the 1980s, Ulfah has been an internationally popular and respected figure in Qur'anic recitation. Ulfah is a scholar of the history of Qur'anic recitation in the Indonesian archipelago, as well as a lecturer at the Institute for Qur'anic Studies in Jakarta.

Ulfah's recitation was featured on the companion CD to Approaching the Qur'an by Michael Sells, and she has toured Malaysia, Egypt, Australia, the United States, Canada, and several European countries. During her 1999 tour in the United States for which Ulfah was accompanied by Anne Rasmussen, her trip was hosted by the Middle East Studies Association of North America.

== See also ==
- Muammar Z.A.
- Mu'min Ainul Mubarak
