= Musabaqah Tilawatil Quran =

Indonesian Islamic religious festival

Musabaqah Tilawatil Quran (Internationally known as Indonesia International Quran Competition) (Arabic: مسابقة تلاوة القران, literally "Quran Recitation Competition", abbreviated as MTQ) is an Indonesian Islamic religious festival held at national level, aimed at glorification of the Qur'an. On this festival, participants compete at reciting Al-Qur'an employing qira'at (specific methodology for recitation).

== History ==
MTQ has been held in Indonesia since the 1940s following the founding of Jami'iyyatul Qurro wal Huffadz (Organization of Recitation and Memorization) by Nahdlatul Ulama, the largest Islamic mass organization in Indonesia. However at this stage the event was confined within regional level.

Since 1968, when the Minister of Religious Affairs K.H. Muhammad Dahlan (one of the leaders of the Nahdlatul Ulama Executive Board) held the event, MTQ has been instituted nationally. The first national level MTQ was held in Makassar in the month of Ramadan in 1968. At the time it only conducted adult recitations. The second MTQ was held in Banjarmasin in 1969. In 1970 the third MTQ was held in Jakarta with a very lively event. Some of the famed qaris (reciters) were discovered during these events.

MTQ has been held 27 times as of 2018. West Sumatra will host the 28th National MTQ in 2020. Today, the subject for competition is not only limited to recitation but also includes speech and Islamic calligraphy.

Logo of Pekan Tilawatil Qur'an RRI (known in English as RRI's Qur'an Recitation Weekly), which is an example of an MTQ-like event held by Radio Republik Indonesia during the holy month of Ramadan.

MTQ is also organized within certain agencies. MTQ Wartawan for journalists is held regularly every three years and will enter the fifth game in 2008. MTQ Pertamina, held within Pertamina, the Indonesian state-owned oil and gas company, had stalled since 1980. MTQ Telkom under the name MAN (Musabawah Al-Quran Nasional), held within Telkom Indonesia, the largest telecommunications service company, will hold its 2008 game in Banda Aceh, making it the eighth festival.

== Host ==
National MTQ (Musabaqah Tilawatil Qur'an Nasional) has held 28 times, here list of host of National MTQ:

1. 1968: Makassar, South Sulawesi
2. 1969: Bandung, West Java
3. 1970: Banjarmasin, South Kalimantan
4. 1971: Medan, North Sumatra
5. 1972: Jakarta
6. 1973: Mataram, West Nusa Tenggara
7. 1974: Surabaya, East Java
8. 1975: Palembang, South Sumatra
9. 1976: Samarinda, East Kalimantan
10. 1977: Manado, North Sulawesi
11. 1979: Semarang, Central Java
12. 1981: Banda Aceh, Aceh
13. 1983: Padang, West Sumatra
14. 1985: Pontianak, West Kalimantan
15. 1988: Bandar Lampung, Lampung
16. 1991: Yogyakarta City, Yogyakarta
17. 1994: Pekanbaru, Riau
18. 1997: Jambi City, Jambi
19. 2000: Palu, Central Sulawesi
20. 2003: Palangkaraya, Central Kalimantan
21. 2006: Kendari, Southeast Sulawesi
22. 2008: Serang, Banten
23. 2010: Bengkulu City, Bengkulu
24. 2012: Ambon, Maluku
25. 2014: Batam, Riau Islands
26. 2016: Mataram, West Nusa Tenggara
27. 2018: Medan-Deli Serdang, North Sumatra
28. 2020: Padang-Padang Pariaman, West Sumatra
29. 2022: Banjarmasin-Banjarbaru-Banjar, South Kalimantan
30. 2024: Samarinda, East Kalimantan
31. 2026: Semarang, Central Java

== Notable participating qaris ==
- K.H. Aziz Muslim
- K.H. Bashori Alwi
- Hj. Rofiqoh darto Wahab
- Hj. Nursiah Ismail
- Hj. Aminah
- Hj. Maria Ulfah
- Muammar Z.A.
- Muhammadong
- Muhammad Ali
- H. Wan Muhammad Ridwan Al-Jufrie
- Mu'min Ainul Mubarak
