= Muhammad VI Awards for the Holy Quran =

Islamic awards in Morocco

جوائز محمد السادس للقرآن الكريم
- Logo of the awards
- Sponsored by: The Moroccan Ministry of Habous & Islamic Affairs.
- Date: 2003; 23 years ago
- Country: Morocco
- First award: 2002
- Website: habous.gov.ma

Television/radio coverage
- Networks
- M24 TV; Al Aoula

Muhammad VI Awards for the Holy Quran (Arabic: جوائز محمد السادس للقرآن الكريم ) are one of the branches of the Mohammed VI Awards, which include various awards, including the Quran, Hadith, thought and calligraphy. They are annual awards organized by the Moroccan Ministry of Habous & Islamic Affairs. The Mohammed VI awards for the Holy Quran consist of several awards, the first one is the Quranic Schools Prize (Kuttab), which is divided into three. Varieties: an award for facilitation, a prize for the initiation methodology, a prize for cost-effectiveness. The grand prize value is fifty thousand Dirhams (50,000 Dirhams) in each category, and prizes are distributed in the Laylat al-Qadr every year.

== History ==
The Qur’anic Schools Prize was the first award. Where it started its organization after royal fees from the King of Morocco Mohamed VI on 23 July 2002. Then, a decree was issued from Mohammed VI to organizing the "Mohammed VI Prize for Memorizing, Reciting, Tajweed, and Interpreting the Noble Qur’an" on 16 February 2005, to create an international award and a national award, and these two prizes are held every year on the anniversary of the Prophet's Mohammad birthday. On the sidelines of the national award, the Holy Child Award for the Holy Qur’an is held. On 30 November 2007, a decree was issued to create a prize for the people of the Qur’an, to be granted to workers to serve the Qur’an and its sciences, its value is one hundred thousand Dirhams (100,000 dirhams).

== Participating countries ==
Many countries around the world participating in The International memorization of the Quran with Tajwid, Explanation, and Hymn Award.

== Awards ==
1. The Kuttab Quranic Schools Award
2. The International memorization of the Quran with Tajwid, Explanation, and Hymn Award
3. The memorization of the Quran for children Award
4. The local memorization of the Quran with Tajwid and Hymn Award
5. The Quran's people Award

Each award has its own competition stages, candidates, winners, and prizes.

== See also ==
- Dubai International Holy Quran Award
