= Islamic Republic of Iran's International Holy Quran Competition =

International Quran Competition at Iran

Iran's International Holy Quran Competition
- Awarded for: Quran memorizing and reciting
- Sponsored by: Government of Iran; Awqaf and Charity Affairs Organization
- Date: 1982; 44 years ago
- Location: Hosseiniyeh Ershad, Tehran
- Country: Iran

The Islamic Republic of Iran's International Holy Quran Competition is the international Islamic Quran reading event that has been held annually since 1982 in Iran.

== History ==
The program was started on 5 February 1982 and 12 countries, such as Malaysia, Bangladesh, India, Iraq, Syria, Guinea, Algeria and Libya took part in the competition. It was held in Hosseiniyeh Ershad, Tehran. The competition takes place each year, in the lunar month of Rajab, and is sponsored by the country’s Awqaf and Charity Affairs Organization.

For many years, this competition was held in Hosseiniyeh Ershad. The 2nd competition took place from 1 to 6 April 1983 and women, for the first time, participated in the competition.

Quran reciters and memorizers from various Muslim and non-Muslim countries attend the week-long international Quranic event.

== Subjects ==
Originally, the competition consisted of two subjects, memorization of the entire Quran and Tahqiq recitation of the Quran. Now it consists of three changing subjects.
