= Dubai International Holy Quran Award =

Annual award for Quran memorization sponsored by the government of Dubai

- Awarded for: Quran memorizing and reciting.
- Sponsored by: Government of Dubai.
- Date: 1997; 29 years ago
- Country: Dubai
- First award: 1997
- Website: quran.gov.ae

The Dubai International Holy Quran Award (Arabic: جائزة دبي الدولية للقرآن الكريم) is an annual award given for memorization of the Qur'an sponsored by the government of Dubai. It was launched in 1997 by order of Mohammed bin Rashid Al Maktoum, Ruler of Dubai. It has given hundreds of awards to people who have excelled in the memorization of the Quran, and international award people from all over the world can participate in it.

The 2026 first-place winners, who both won $1 million, were Karrar Layth Saad from Iraq (male) and Jana Ehab Ramadan from Egypt (female).

== See also ==
- Muhammad VI Awards for the Holy Quran
- List of religion-related awards
